= List of school massacres by death toll =

This is an arbitrary list of select school massacres by death toll.

== List of school massacres ==
School massacres
#	Name	Date	Year	Location	Country	Killed	Injured	Weapons	Perpetrator	Non-state terrorist group	Fate of perpetrator(s)	Ref
1	Santa María School massacre	Dec 21	1907	Iquique	Chile	~2,000	?	F	Chilean Army	No	300 killed	
2	Beslan school siege	Sep 1	2004	Beslan, North Ossetia-Alania	Russia	334	800+	F M E	Riyad-us Saliheen Brigade of Martyrs	Yes	Most killed by special forces, one captured and subsequently sentenced to life imprisonment	
3	Walisongo School Massacre	May 28	2000	Poso, Central Sulawesi	Indonesia	191	?	F M	Christian militants	Yes	Executed	
4	Dhaka University massacre	March 25	1971	Dhaka	Bangladesh	200	?	F A	Pakistan Army	No		
5	Bombing of Gorla	Oct 20	1944	Gorla	Italian Social Republic	184	?	O	United States Army Air Forces	No	None	
6	2026 Minab school attack	Feb 28	2026	Minab	Iran	168–180	95	O	United States Armed Forces	No	None	
7	Eastern University massacre	Sep 5	1990	Chenkalady	Sri Lanka	158	?	F	Sri Lankan Army	No	None	
8	Peshawar school massacre	Dec 16	2014	Peshawar	Pakistan	149	114	F M E	Tehrik-i-Taliban Pakistan	Yes	4 hanged and 2 committed suicide	
9	Garissa University College attack	April 2	2015	Garissa	Kenya	148	79	F	al-Shabaab	Yes	4 killed and 5 arrested	
10	Al-Tabaeen school attack	Aug 10	2024	Gaza City	Palestine	100	47	?	Israel Defense Forces	?	?	
11	Kabul school bombing	May 8	2021	Kabul	Afghanistan	90	240	E	Disputed	Yes		
12	Nagerkovil school bombing	Sep 22	1995	Jaffna	Sri Lanka	71	150	O	Sri Lanka Air Force	No	None	
13	Kyanguli Fire Tragedy	March 24	2001	Machakos County	Kenya	67	?	A	Davis Onyango Opiyo, Felix Mambo Ngumbao (school students)	No	Arrested	
14	Al-Fakhoora school airstrikes	November 4	2023	Jabalia refugee camp	Palestine	65+	70+	?	Israel Defense Forces	?	?	.
15	Chencholai bombing	Aug 14	2006	Mullaitivu	Sri Lanka	61	155	O	Sri Lanka Air Force	No	None	
16	Buni Yadi Federal Government College massacre	Feb 25	2014	Yobe State	Nigeria	59	?	F M A	Boko Haram suspected	Yes		
17	September 2022 Kabul school bombing	Sep 30	2022	Kabul	Afghanistan	53+	110	E		Yes	Suicide	
18	Aleppo Artillery School massacre	June 16	1979	Aleppo	Syria	50–83	?	F E	Muslim Brotherhood	Yes	Escaped	
19	Al-Buraq school airstrike	Nov 9	2023	Gaza City	Palestine	50+	?	?	Israel Defense Forces	?	?	
20	Thammasat University massacre	Oct 6	1976	Sanam Luang	Thailand	46–100+	167	F O	Police, army and right-wing paramilitary: Red Gaurs, Nawaphon, and Village Scouts	No	None	
21	Bahr El-Baqar primary school bombing	April 8	1970	Bahr el-Baqar, Sharqia	Egypt	46	50+	E	Israeli Air Force	No	None	
22	Bombing of Sandhurst Road School	January 20	1943	Ardgowan Road, Catford, London	United Kingdom	44	60	O	Heinz Schumann, 28, Luftwaffe	Yes (Terrorangriff )	KIA, November 8, 1943	
22	Bath School disaster (Note: At least one of the victims was a relative of the assailant.)	May 18	1927	Bath Township, Michigan	United States	44	58	E	Andrew Kehoe, 55	No	Suicide	
24	Fanglin Village primary school explosion	March 6	2001	Wanzai County, Jiangxi	China	42	27	E	Li Chuicai (李垂才), 33	No	Suicide	
24	Mpondwe school massacre	June 16	2023	Mpondwe	Uganda	42	8	E M	Allied Democratic Forces	Yes	2 terrorists killed, 20 people who collaborated with the ADF arrested	
24	Mamudo school massacre	July 6	2013	Mamudo, Yobe State	Nigeria	42	6+	F A	Boko Haram	Yes	Escaped	
27	Fahmi al-Jarjawi School attack	May 25	2025	Daraj Quarter	Palestine	36+	55+	?	Israel Defense Forces	?	?	
28	Nong Bua Lamphu massacre	Oct 6	2022	Na Klang district, Nong Bua Lamphu	Thailand	36	10	F M V	Panya Khamrab (ปัญญา คำราบ)	No	Suicide	
29	Al-Sardi school attack	June 6	2024	Nuseirat refugee camp	Palestine	35+	70+	?	Israel Defense Forces	?	?	
30	2020 Kabul University attack	Nov 2	2020	Kabul	Islamic Republic of Afghanistan	32	50	F	Islamic Republic of Afghanistan	Yes	All three killed by security forces	
31	Virginia Tech shooting	April 16	2007	Blacksburg, VA	United States	32	17	F	Seung-Hui Cho (조승희), 23	No	Suicide	
32	Al-Awda school attack	July 9	2024	Abasan al-Kabira	Palestine	31+	53+	?	Israel Defense Forces	?	?	
33	Ma'alot massacre	May 15	1974	Ma'alot	Israel	31	70	F M	Democratic Front for the Liberation of Palestine	Yes	Killed by police	
34	Khadija School airstrike	July 26	2024	Deir al-Balah	Palestine	30+	100+	?	Israel Defense Forces	?	?	
35	Hamama School bombing	Aug 4	2024	Sheikh Radwan	Palestine	30	60+	?	Israel Defense Forces	?	?	
36	October 2024 Abu Hussein school attack	Oct 17	2024	Jabalia refugee camp	Palestine	28+	160+	?	Israel Defense Forces	?	?	
37	October 2024 Rufaida school attack	Oct 10	2024	Deir al-Balah	Palestine	28+	54+	?	Israel Defense Forces	?	?	
38	Sandy Hook Elementary School shooting	Dec 14	2012	Newtown, CT	United States	27	2	F	Adam Lanza, 20	No	Suicide	
39	Ibn Rushd school bombing	Oct 6	2024	Deir al-Balah	Palestine	26	93	?	Israel Defense Forces	?	?	
40	Al-Falah School airstrike	Nov 17	2023	Gaza City	Palestine	24+	100	?	Israel Defense Forces	?	?	
41	Gîsca school bombing	April 4	1950	Gîsca, Moldavia	Soviet Union	23	?	E	Vladimir Tatarnikov, 29	No	Suicide	
41	2017 Darul Quran Ittifaqiyah madrasa fire	Sep 14	2017	Kuala Lumpur	Malaysia	23	5	A	Muhammad Adli Shah Bin Mohd Yusry	No	Detained	
43	2025 Depayin School bombing	May 12	2025	Tabayin Township, Sagaing Region	Myanmar	22+	105	O	Tatmadaw	No	N	
43	Bacha Khan University attack	Jan 20	2016	Charsadda	Pakistan	22+	?	FE	Tehrik-i-Taliban	Yes	N	
45	Uvalde school shooting	May 24	2022	Uvalde, TX	United States	21	18	F	Salvador Rolando Ramos, 18	No	Killed by border patrol tactical team	
46	Osama bin Zaid school airstrike	Nov 3	2023	Gaza Strip	Palestine	20+	24+	?	Israel Defense Forces	?	?	
47	Kerch Polytechnic College massacre	Oct 17	2018	Kerch, Crimea	Russia / Ukraine	20	70	F E	Vladislav Roslyakov, 18	No	Suicide	
47	2023 Mahdia school fire	May 21	2023	Mahdia, Potaro-Siparuni	Guyana	20	29	A	Unnamed student	No	Arrested	
49	September 2024 Al-Jawni School attack	September 11	2024	Nuseirat refugee camp	Palestine	18+	44+	?	Israel Defense Forces	?	?	
50	2004 Dhemaji school bombing	Aug 15	2004	Dhemaji, Assam	India	18	40	E	United Liberation Front of Assam	Yes		
50	Izhevsk school shooting	Sep 26	2022	Izhevsk, Udmurtia	Russia	18	23	F	Artyom Kazantsev, 34	No	Suicide	
52	University of Texas tower shooting	Aug 1	1966	Austin, TX	United States	17	31	F	Charles Whitman, 25	No	Killed by police	
52	Parkland high school shooting	Feb 14	2018	Parkland, FL	United States	17	18	F	Nikolas Cruz, 19	No	Life imprisonment	
52	Dunblane massacre	March 13	1996	Dunblane	United Kingdom	17	15	F	Thomas Hamilton, 43	No	Suicide	
55	Erfurt school massacre	April 26	2002	Erfurt	Germany	16	1	F	Robert Steinhäuser, 19	No	Suicide	
56	Winnenden school shooting	March 11	2009	Winnenden and Wendlingen	Germany	15	9	F	Tim Kretschmer, 17	No	Suicide	
57	2023 Prague shooting	Dec 21	2023	Prague	Czech Republic	14	25	F	David Kozák, 24	No	Suicide	
57	Columbine High School massacre	April 20	1999	Columbine, CO	United States	14	23	F M E	Eric Harris, 18; Dylan Klebold, 17	No	Both died by suicide	
57	École Polytechnique massacre	Dec 6	1989	Montreal, QC	Canada	14	14	F M	Marc Lépine, 25	No	Suicide	
60	Janaúba massacre	Oct 5	2017	Janaúba	Brazil	13	37	A	Damião Soares dos Santos, 50	No	Perished in the flames	
60	Chlef school attack	Oct 15	2002	El Hadjadj, Chlef Province	Algeria	13	1	F	hardline Armed Islamic Group (GIA)	Yes	None	
60	Let Yet Kone massacre	Sep 16	2022	Let Yet Kone, Sagaing Region	Myanmar	13	?	O F	Myanmar Army & Myanmar Air Force	No	None	
63	Azerbaijan State Oil Academy shooting	April 30	2009	Baku	Azerbaijan	12	13	F	Farda Gadirov, 28	No	Suicide	
63	Rio de Janeiro school shooting	April 7	2011	Rio de Janeiro	Brazil	12	22	F	Wellington Oliveira, 23	No	Suicide	
63	2026 Onikişubat school shooting	April 15	2026	Onikişubat	Turkey	12	20	F	İsa Aras Mersinli, 14	No	Suicide or Stabbed	
63	Shiguan kindergarten attack	May 8	2006	Shiguan	China	12	5	M A	Bai Ningyang (白宁阳), 18	No	Death penalty	
67	Enoch Brown school massacre	July 26	1764	Pennsylvania	Pennsylvania	11	1	F M	4 Lenape Natives	No	Unknown	
68	An-Nazla School massacre	May 25	2024	Gaza Strip	Palestine	10+	?	?	Israel Defense Forces	?	?	
69	Cologne school massacre	June 11	1964	Cologne	West Germany	10	22	F M	Walter Seifert, 42	No	Suicide	
69	Santa Fe High School shooting	May 18	2018	Santa Fe, TX	United States	10	13	F E	Dimitrios Pagourtzis, 17	No	Arrested	
69	Suzano school shooting	March 13	2019	Suzano	Brazil	10	11	F M E	Guilherme Taucci Monteiro, 17; Luiz Henrique de Castro, 25		Castro was murdered by Monteiro, who then committed suicide	
69	Graz school shooting	June 10	2025	Graz, Styria	Austria	10	11	F E	Arthur Achleitner, 21	No	Suicide	
69	Belgrade school shooting	May 3	2023	Belgrade	Serbia	10	6	F	Kosta Kecmanović, 13	No	Arrested	
69	2025 Risbergska school shooting	Feb 4	2025	Örebro	Sweden	10	6	F A	Rickard Andersson, 35	No	Suicide	
69	Kauhajoki school shooting	Sep 23	2008	Kauhajoki	Finland	10	1	F A	Matti Saari, 22	No	Suicide	
76	Kazan school shooting	May 11	2021	Kazan	Russia	9	23	F E	Ilnaz Galyaviev, 19	No	Sentenced to life imprisonment	
76	Mizhi County middle school stabbing	April 27	2018	Mizhi County	China	9	12	M	Zhao Zewei, 23	No	Arrested and later executed	
76	Shengshui Temple kindergarten attack	May 12	2010	Linchang	China	9	11	M	Wu Huanming (吴焕明), 47	No	Suicide	
76	2015 Umpqua Community College shooting	Oct 1	2015	Roseburg, OR	United States	9	8	F	Christopher Harper-Mercer, 26	No	Suicide	
76	Red Lake massacre	March 21	2005	Red Lake, MN	United States	9	5	F	Jeffrey Weise, 16	No	Suicide	
76	Ruzhou school massacre	Nov 26	2004	Ruzhou	China	9	3	M	Yan Yanming (闫彦明), 21	No	Death penalty	
76	2026 Nonthaburi shootings	Aug 7	2026	Bang Bua Thong	Thailand	8	30+	F	Patchata Yimruang, 14	No	Suicide	
83	2026 Tumbler Ridge shooting	February 10	2026	Tumbler Ridge, BC	Canada	8	27	F	Jesse van Rootselaar, 18	No	Suicide	
83	2024 Wuxi stabbing	Nov 16	2024	Wuxi	China	8	17	M	Xu Jiajin, 21	No	Convicted and later executed	
83	Ikeda school massacre	June 8	2001	Ikeda, Osaka	Japan	8	15	M	Mamoru Takuma (宅間守), 37	No	Death penalty	
83	2008 Jerusalem yeshiva attack	March 6	2008	Jerusalem	Israel	8	11	F	Alaa Abu Dheim (علاء هاشم أبو دهيم), 26	No	Killed by police	
83	Sofia shooting	Dec 25	1974	Sofia	Bulgaria	8	8	F M	Branimir Donchev, 17	No	Arrested, later shot by police during escape attempt	
83	Nanping school massacre	March 23	2010	Nanping	China	8	5	M	Zheng Minsheng (郑明生), 41	No	Death penalty	
83	2023 Parachinar school shooting	May 4	2023	Parachinar	Pakistan	8	3	M	All 3 unknown people	Yes	Unknown	
83	Enshi elementary school stabbing	Sep 12	2019	Enshi City	China	8	2	M	Yu, 40	No	Arrested	
83	Jokela school shooting	Nov 7	2007	Jokela	Finland	8	1	F A	Pekka-Eric Auvinen, 18	No	Suicide	
92	2025 Jinhua car attack	April 22	2025	Jinhua	China	7-14	12+	V	Unnamed women	No	Escaped	
93	Beyazıt massacre	March 16	1978	Istanbul	Turkey	7	41	F	Grey Wolves	Yes	One of the perpetrators was sentenced to 11 years in prison.	
93	Kumba school massacre	Oct 24	2020	Kumba, Southwest Region	Cameroon	7	13	F M	Unknown	?		
93	Lyamino School shooting	Feb 11	1958	Lyamino, Perm Krai	Soviet Union	7	6	F	Mikhail Tselousov (Целоусов, Михаил), 24	No	Sentenced to death and executed	
93	Burma school massacre	March 26	1975	Kachin	Burma	7	5	M	U Win-maung	No	Killed by police	
93	Zhuping school massacre	April 1	1996	Meitian	China	7	5	M	Wang Xiangjun (王湘军)	No	Arrested	
93	2012 Oikos University shooting	April 2	2012	Oakland, CA	United States	7	3	F	One Goh, 43	No	Life imprisonment	
93	California State University, Fullerton massacre	July 12	1976	Fullerton, CA	United States	7	2	F	Edward Charles Allaway, 37	No	Arrested	
100	Al-Maghazi UNRWA school airstrike	Oct 17	2023	Maghazi refugee camp	Palestine	6+	24+	?	Israel Defense Forces	?	?	
101	Perm State University shooting	Sep 20	2021	Perm	Russia	6	23	F	Timur Bekmansurov, 18	No	Severely injured, arrested and later sentenced to life imprisonment	
101	Anne Anne Kindergarten stabbing	June 3	1982	Sham Shui Po	Hong Kong	6	37	M	Lee Chi Hang (李志衡), 28	No	Sent to psychiatric hospital	
101	April 2022 Kabul school bombing	April 19	2022	Kabul	Afghanistan	6	25	E		Yes	Unknown	
101	2014 Isla Vista killings	May 23	2014	Isla Vista, California	United States	6	14	F V M	Elliot Rodger, 22	No	Suicide	
101	Sanaa school shooting	March 30	1997	Sanaa	Yemen	6	12	F	Mohammed Ahmad Misleh al-Nazari, 48	No	Death penalty	
101	Shafrir synagogue shooting attack	April 11	1956	Kfar Chabad	Israel	6	5	F		Yes	Unknown	
101	West Nickel Mines School shooting	Oct 2	2006	Nickel Mines, PA	United States	6	4	F	Charles Carl Roberts IV, 32	No	Suicide	
101	Leningrad Military School massacre	May 19	1977	Leningrad	Soviet Union	6	2	F	Anatoly Fedorenko (Федоренко, Анатолий)	No	Sentenced to death and executed	
101	Massacre in the Kamyshin higher military engineer school	March 9	1997	Kamyshin	Russia	6	2	F	Sergei Lepnev (Лепнев, Сергей), 18	No	25 years in prison	
101	2023 Nashville School Shooting	March 27	2023	Nashville, Tennessee	United States	6	1	F	Aiden Hale, 28	No	Killed by police	
111	Stockton schoolyard shooting	Jan 17	1989	Stockton, CA	United States	5	32	F A	Patrick Purdy, 24	No	Suicide	
111	Atzmona attack	March 7	2002	Atzmona, Gaza Strip	Palestine	5	23	F E	Mohammed Fathi Farhat (محمد فتحي فرحات), 17	Yes	Killed by soldiers	
111	Poe Elementary School bombing	Sep 15	1959	Houston, TX	United States	5	19	E	Paul Harold Orgeron, 49	No	Killed by the explosion	
111	Northern Illinois University shooting	Feb 14	2008	DeKalb, IL	United States	5	17	F	Steven Kazmierczak, 27	No	Suicide	
111	Eppstein school shooting	June 3	1983	Eppstein	West Germany	5	14	F	Karel Charva, 34	No	Suicide	
111	Obafemi Awolowo University massacre	July 10	1999	Ifẹ, Osun State	Nigeria	5	11	F M	Black Axe	No		
111	1974 Olean High School shooting	Dec 30	1974	Olean, New York	United States	5	11	F E	Anthony F. Barbaro	No	Arrested	
111	1998 Westside Middle School shooting	March 24	1998	Jonesboro, AR	United States	5	10	F	Andrew Golden, 11; Mitchell Johnson, 13	No	Both imprisoned until their 21st birthday	
111	La Loche shootings	Jan 22	2016	La Loche, SK	Canada	5	6	F	Randan Dakota Fontaine, 17	No	Life imprisonment	
111	Huaiji school massacre	Nov 26	2002	Huaiji	China	5	2	M	Shi Ruoqiu (施若丘), 30	No	Arrested	
111	1966 Rose-Mar College of Beauty shooting	Nov 12	1966	Mesa, AZ	United States	5	2	F	Robert Smith, 18	No	Life imprisonment	
111	2013 Santa Monica shootings	June 7	2013	Santa Monica, CA	United States	5	2	F A	John Zawahri, 23	No	Killed by police	
111	1991 University of Iowa shooting	Nov 1	1991	Iowa City, IA	United States	5	1	F	Gang Lu (卢刚), 28	No	Suicide	
111	South Pasadena Junior High School shooting	May 6	1940	South Pasadena, California	United States	5	1	F	Verlin Spencer, 37	No	Arrested	
125	Saudades massacre	May 4	2021	Saudades, Santa Catarina	Brazil	5	1	V	Fabiano Kipper Mai, 18	No	Arrested	
125	San Juan massacre	Oct 10	1977	San Juan	Trinidad and Tobago	5	0	M			Arrested	
125	Maradi massacre	Jan 10	1994	Maradi	Niger	5	0	M			Arrested	
128	Thurston High School shooting	May 20/21	1998	Springfield, OR	United States	4	28	F	Kipland Kinkel, 15	No	Life imprisonment	
128	Bremen school shooting	June 20	1913	Bremen	Germany	4	21	F	Heinz Schmidt, 29	No	Sent to psychiatric hospital	
128	Linwu school massacre	Sep 30	2004	Linwu	China	4	12	M	Liu Hongwen (刘红文), 28	No	Sent to psychiatric hospital	
128	Guangyi Centre School stabbing	Sep 30	2004	Hunan	China	4	16	M	Liu Hongwen (刘红文), 28	No	Arrested and found not guilty by reason of insanity	
128	Dendermonde nursery attack	Jan 23	2009	Beveren and Sint-Gillis-bij-Dendermonde	Belgium	4	12	M	Kim De Gelder, 20	No	Life imprisonment	
133	2022 Aracruz school shootings	Nov 25	2022	Aracruz, Espírito Santo	Brazil	4	11	V	Gabriel Rodrigues Castiglioni, 16	No	Arrested	
133	Lindhurst High School shooting	May 1	1992	Olivehurst, CA	United States	4	10	F	Eric Houston, 20	No	Death penalty	
133	2024 Apalachee High School shooting	Sep 4	2024	Winder, GA	United States	4	7	F	Colt Gray, 14	No	Life imprisonment	
133	Oxford High School shooting	Nov 30	2021	Oxford Township, Michigan	United States	4	7	F	Ethan Crumbley, 15	No	Life imprisonment	
133	2007 Colorado YWAM and New Life shootings	Dec 9	2007	Arvada and Colorado Springs, CO	United States	4	5	F	Matthew Murray, 24	No	Suicide	
133	Jiangxi kindergarten stabbing	Aug 3	2022	Jiangxi	China	4	5	M	Liu Xiaohui, 48	No	He escaped, but the next day he was run over and died.	
133	Droyssig school shooting	Oct 6	1902	Droyssig	Austria-Hungary	4	3	F	Unnamed teacher	No	Lynched to death by residents.	
133	Suixi school massacre	Jan 26	2003	Suixi	China	4	3	M	Chen Peiquan (陈培权), 35	No	Arrested	
133	Eskişehir University shooting	April 5	2018	Eskişehir	Turkey	4	3	M	Volkan Bayar, 37	No	Arrested	
133	Marysville shooting	Oct 24	2014	Marysville, WA	United States	4	3	F	Jaylen Fryberg, 15	No	Suicide	
133	Moses Montefiore Academy shooting	Sep 22	1988	Chicago, IL	United States	4	2	F	Clemmie Henderson, 40	No	Killed by police	
133	Gongyi school massacre	Sep 14	2011	Gongyi	China	4	2	M	Wang Hongbin(王宏斌), 30	No	Arrested	
145	2026 Silver Rail Elementary School shooting	Oct 15	2026	Bend, Oregon	United States	4	2	V	Griffin J. John II, 16	No	Killed by bystander	
145	Concordia University massacre	Aug 24	1992	Montreal, QC	Canada	4	1	F	Valery Fabrikant, 52	No	Life imprisonment	
145	Gulbene kindergarten massacre	Feb 22	1999	Gulbene	Latvia	4	1	M	Alexander Koryakov, 19	No	Life imprisonment	
145	2001 Isla Vista killings	Feb 24	2001	Isla Vista, CA	United States	4	1	V	David Attias, 18	No	Sent to psychiatric hospital	
145	Ozar Hatorah shooting	March 19	2012	Toulouse	France	4	1	F	Mohammed Merah, 23	No	Killed by police	
145	Kunming school killings	Feb 13–15	2004	Kunming	China	4	0	M	Ma Jiajue (馬加爵), 23	No	Death penalty	
151	Zibo school massacre	Aug 4	2010	Zibo	China	3–4	7–20	M	Fang Jiantang (方建堂), 26	No	Death penalty	
152	2026 Tacloban school shooting	June 22	2026	Tacloban	Philippines	3	20	F	"Rod" and "Nash"	No	Both Arrested	
153	Datu Usman Mampen Elementary School shooting	Sep 13	2026	Bangsamoro	Philippines	3	15	F A	Unidentified males	No	Unknown	
154	University of Erlangen–Nuremberg shooting	Dec 20	1972	Erlangen	West Germany	3	13	F A	Robert Kausler	No	Suicide	
154	Yongtai school stabbing	Feb 27	2002	Yongtai	China	3	11	M	Huang Qiaoying, 38	No	Arrested and later found not guilty by reason of insanity	
154	Wilno school massacre	May 6	1925	Wilno	Poland	3	~10	F E	Stanisław Ławrynowicz, Janusz Obrąbalski	No	Both died by suicide	
154	2025 Brown University shooting	Dec 13/15	2025	Providence, Rhode Island	United States	3	9	F E	Cláudio Manuel Neves Valente	No	Committed suicide	
154	1997 Pearl High School shooting	Oct 1	1997	Pearl, Mississippi	United States	3	7	F	Luke Woodham, 16	No	Arrested	
154	Campinas school shooting	Aug 6	1999	Campinas São Paulo	Brazil	3	7	F		No	All 4 Arrested	
154	1997 Heath High School shooting	Dec 1	1997	Paducah, Kentucky, Kentucky	United States	3	5	F	Michael Carneal, 14	No	Life imprisonment with no parole	
154	2023 Michigan State University shooting	Feb 13	2023	East Lansing MI	United States	3	5	F	Anthony Dwayne McRae, 43	No	Self-inflicted gunshot	
154	2004 Carmen de Patagones school shooting	Sep 28	2004	Buenos Aires Province	Argentina	3	5	F	Rafael Solich, 15	No	Arrested	
154	Guangzhou school stabbing	Feb 25	2008	Guangzhou	China	3	4	M	Chen Wenzhen (陈文真)	No	Suicide	
154	Dormers Wells High School shooting	Nov 11	1987	Southall	United Kingdom	3	3	F	Rajinder Singh Batth Mangit Singh Sunder	No	Both sentenced to life imprisonment.	
154	2023 University of Nevada shooting	Dec 6	2023	University of Nevada, Paridise, Nevada	United States	3	3	F	Anthony James Polito, 67	No	Killed by police	
154	Ateneo de Manila shooting	July 24	2022	Ateneo de Manila University, Quezon City	Philippines	3	3	F	Chao-Tiao Yumol, 38	No	Arrested	
154	2010 University of Alabama in Huntsville shooting	Feb 12	2010	Huntsville, Alabama	United States	3	3	F	Amy Bishop, 44	No	Arrested	
154	2002 Appalachian School of Law shooting	Jan 16	2002	Grundy, Virginia	United States	3	3	F	Peter Odighizuwa, 43	No	Arrested	
154	2012 Chardon High School shooting	Feb 27	2012	Chardon, Ohio	United States	3	3	M	Thomas Lane III, 17	No	Arrested	
154	Aarhus University shooting	April 5	1994	Aarhus	Denmark	3	2	F	Flemming Nielsen	No	Suicide	
171	2022 University of Virginia shooting	Nov 13	2022	Charlottesville, Virginia	United States	3	2	F	Christopher Darnell Jones Jr., 22	No	Arrested	
171	Padua University shooting	March 5	1999	Padua	Italy	3	1	F	Mariano Molon	No	26 years in prison.	
171	Veshkayma kindergarten shooting	April 26	2022	Veshkayma, Ulyanovsk Oblast	Russia	3	1	F	Ruslan Akhtyamov, 26	No	Suicide	
171	2026 Ntabankulu Primary School shooting	Jan 22	2026	Ntabankulu, Eastern Cape	South Africa	3	1	F	Ntuthuzelo Gcaba, 51	No	Suicide	
171	2012 HUB Mall shooting	June 15	2012	Edmonton, Alberta	Canada	3	1	F	Travis Baumgartner, 21	No	Arrested	
171	1996 Frontier Middle School shooting	Feb 2	1996	Moses Lake, Washington	United States	3	1	F	Barry Dale Loukatitis, 14	No	Arrested	
177	2026 Islamic Center of San Diego shooting	May 18	2026	San Diego, CA	United States	3	1	F	Cain Clark, 17 Caleb Vazquez, 18	No	Both Committed Suicide	
178	Technological University of Guadalajara attack	March 4	2024	Guadalajara, MX	Mexico	3	1	F	Gabriel Alejandro Galaviz González, 20	No	Arrested	
179	2002 Eching and Freising shootings	Feb 19	2002	Eching, Freising	Germany	3	1	V	Adam Labus, 22	No	Suicide	
179	Sanski Most school shooting	Aug 21	2024	Una-Sana Canton, Sanski Most	Bosnia and Herzegovina	3	0	F	Mehmed Vukalić, 62	No	Arrested	
179	Heliópolis school shooting	Oct 18	2024	Heliópolis	Brazil	3	0	F	Samuel Santana Andrade, 14	No	Suicide	
179	2002 University of Arizona shooting	Oct 28	2002	Tucson, Arizona	United States	3	0	F	Flores, Robert Stewart Jr., 41	No	Suicide	
179	1996 San Diego State University shooting	Aug 15	1996	San Diego, California	United States	3	0	F	Fredrick Martin Davidson, 36	No	Arrested	
179	Valparaíso school shootings	Dec 17	1999	Valparaíso	Chile	3	0	F	Iván Aranciba Navarro, 47	No	Arrested	
179	2023 Rotterdam shootings	Sep 28	2023	Rotterdam	Netherlands	3	0	F	Fouad Lakhlili, 32	No	Arrested	

=== Footnotes ===
The # symbol indicates the massacre's ranking by number of deaths (since this list is sorted by death toll, not by date or by number of overall casualties).

The Weapons column gives a basic description of the weapons used:

F – Firearms and other ranged weapons. This primarily includes rifles and handguns, but also bows and crossbows, grenade launchers, flamethrowers, or slingshots.
M – Melee weapons, like knives, swords, spears, machetes, axes, clubs, rods, rocks, or bare hands.
O – Any other weapons, such as bombs, hand grenades, Molotov cocktails, poison and poisonous gas, as well as vehicle and arson attacks.

A – indicates that fire was the only other weapon used
V – indicates that a vehicle was the only other weapon used
E – indicates that explosives of any sort were the only other weapon used

== Rampage killers ==
This is a list of mass/spree killers who attacked schools. A mass murderer is typically defined as someone who kills three or more people in one incident, with no "cooling off" period. A mass murder typically occurs in a single location where one or more persons kill several others.

This list does not include serial killers, or major figures in politics and government who orchestrated such actions.

Rampage killings
Perpetrator	Date	Year	Location	Country	Killed	Injured	W	Additional Notes	Ref.
Opiyo, Davis Onyango, 16 Ngumbao, Felix Mambo, 16	March 25	2001	Machakos County	Kenya	67	18	A	Both arrested and charged	
Kehoe, Andrew Philip, 55 (Note: At least one of the victims was a relative of the assailant.)	May 18	1927	Bath Township, Michigan	United States	45	57	FME	Committed suicide Also killed numerous animals One victim succumbed to injuries	
Li Chuicai, 32 (李垂才)	March 6	2001	Fanglin Village, Wanzai County, Jiangxi	China	41	27	EO	Committed suicide	
Khamrab, Panya, 34 (ปัญญา คำราบ)	Oct 6	2022	Na Klang	Thailand	37	10	FMV	Committed suicide	
Cho, Seung-Hui, 23 (조승희)	April 16	2007	Blacksburg, Virginia	United States	32	17	F	Committed suicide Six more people were injured by jumping out of windows as they escape from the perpetrator	
Lanza, Adam Peter, 20	Dec 14	2012	Newtown, Connecticut	United States	27	2	F	Committed suicide	
Unknown	May 25	1982	Aire-sur-l'Adour	France	24	?	A	Unsolved	
Muhammad Adli Shah Bin Mohd Yusry, 16	Sep 14	2017	Kuala Lumpur	Malaysia	23	5	A	Convicted and sentenced to detention at the pleasure of the Yang di-Pertuan Agong	
Tatarnikov, Vladimir Georgievich, 29	Apr 4	1950	Gîsca	Moldavian Soviet Socialist Republic	23	?	E	Died in the blast	
Ramos, Salvador Rolando, 18	May 24	2022	Uvalde, Texas	United States	21	18	F	Killed by police Three more were injured by police	
Patrick, 14 Marc, 14	Feb 6	1973	Paris	France	21	?	A	Patrick sentenced to five years in prison; Marc sentenced to four	
Roslyakov, Vladislav Igorevich, 18 (Росляков, Владислав Игоревич)	Oct 17	2018	Kerch	Russia (de facto); Ukraine (de jure)	20	73	F E	Committed suicide	
Unnamed student, 15	May 21	2023	Mahdia	Guyana	20	29	A	Arrested and charged with 20 counts of murder	
Kazantsev, Artyom Igorevich, 34 (Казанцев, Артём Игоревич)	Sep 26	2022	Izhevsk	Russia	18	23	F	Committed suicide	
Cruz, Nikolas Jacob, 19	Feb 14	2018	Parkland, Florida	United States	17	18	F	Sentenced to life imprisonment	
Hamilton, Thomas Watt, 43	March 13	1996	Dunblane	United Kingdom	17	15	F	Committed suicide	
Whitman, Charles Joseph, 25	Aug 1	1966	Austin, Texas	United States	16	31	FM	Killed by police Terminated a pregnancy One of the victims died in 2001; attributed to this event One more was injured while fleeing	
Kozák, David, 24	Dec 16–21	2023	Prague	Czech Republic	16	25	F	Committed suicide One more died indirectly.	
Steinhäuser, Robert, 19	April 26	2002	Erfurt	Germany	16	1	F	Committed suicide	
Kretschmer, Tim, 17	March 11	2009	Winnenden and Wendlingen	Germany	15	9	F	Committed suicide	
Harris, Eric David, 18; Klebold, Dylan Bennet, 17	April 20	1999	Columbine, Colorado	United States	14	20	F O	Both committed suicide. One of the victims died in 2025; attributed to this event	
Lépine, Marc, 25	Dec 6	1989	Montreal, QC	Canada	14	14	FM	Committed suicide	
Soares dos Santos, Damião, 50	Oct 5	2017	Janaúba	Brazil	13	37	A	Committed suicide	
Menezes de Oliveira, Wellington, 23	April 7	2011	Rio de Janeiro	Brazil	12	22	F	Committed suicide	
Gadirov, Farda, 28	April 30	2009	Baku	Azerbaijan	12	13	F	Committed suicide	
Mersinli, İsa Aras, 13	April 15	2026	Onikişubat	Turkey	12	13	F	Killed	
Bai Ningyang, 18 (白宁阳)	May 8	2006	Shiguan	China	12	5	MA	Sentenced to death and executed	
Seifert, Willi Walter, 42	June 11	1964	Cologne	West Germany	10	22	FM	Committed suicide	
Pagourtzis, Dimitrios, 17 (accused)	May 18	2018	Santa Fe, Texas	United States	10	13	F	Arrested	
Achleitner, Arthur, 21	June 10	2025	Graz	Austria	10	11	F	Committed suicide	
Kecmanović, Kosta, 13	May 3	2023	Belgrade	Serbia	10	6	F	Arrested	
Andersson, Rickard, 35	Feb 4	2025	Örebro	Sweden	10	6	F A	Committed suicide	
Saari, Matti Juhani, 22	Sep 23	2008	Kauhajoki	Finland	10	1	F A	Committed suicide	
Galyaviev, Ilnaz Rinatovich, 19 (Галявиев, Ильназ Ринатович)	May 11	2021	Kazan	Russia	9	23	F E	Sentenced to life imprisonment Twenty-four more were injured while fleeing	
Zhao Zewei, 28 (赵泽伟)	April 27	2018	Yulin	China	9	12	M	Sentenced to death and executed	
Wu Huanming, 47 (吴焕明)	May 12	2010	Linchang	China	9	11	M	Committed suicide	
Weise, Jeffrey James, 16	March 21	2005	Red Lake, Minnesota	United States	9	9	F	Committed suicide	
Harper-Mercer, Christopher Sean, 26	Oct 1	2015	Roseburg, Oregon	United States	9	8	F	Committed suicide	
Yan, Yanming, 21 (闫彦明)	Nov 26	2004	Ruzhou	China	9	3	M	Sentenced to death and executed	
Yimruang, Patchat, 14 (พัชชา ยิ้มเรือง)	Aug 7	2026	Bang Bua Thong & Bang Kruai	Thailand	8	30+	F	Committed suicide	
Van Rootselaar, Jesse, 18	Feb 10	2026	Tumbler Ridge, BC	Canada	8	27	F	Committed suicide	
Xu, Jiajin, 21	Nov 16	2024	Yixing	China	8	17	M	Arrested	
Takuma, Mamoru, 37 (宅間守)	June 8	2001	Ikeda, Osaka	Japan	8	15	M	Sentenced to death and executed	
Ala Hisham Abu Dheim, 26 (علاء هاشم أبو دهيم)	March 6	2008	Jerusalem	Israel	8	11	F	Killed by soldiers	
Henrique de Castro, Luiz, 25; Taucci Monteiro, Guilherme, 17	March 13	2019	Suzano	Brazil	8	11	FM	Henrique killed by Taucci; Taucci committed suicide	
Donchev, Branimir Delchev, 17 (Дончев, Бранимир Делчев)	Dec 24	1974	Durvenitsa	Bulgaria	8	8	FM	Incarcerated in a mental facility. Later shot and killed by officers in an escape attempt	
Zheng Minsheng, 41 (郑民生)	March 23	2010	Nanping	China	8	5	M	Sentenced to death and executed	
Yu Hua, 40 (於華)	Sep 2	2019	Baiyangping	China	8	2	M	Sentenced to death and executed	
Auvinen, Pekka-Eric, 18	Nov 7	2007	Jokela	Finland	8	1	F A	Committed suicide Twelve more were injured while fleeing	
Merah, Mohammed, 23 (محمد مراح)	March 11–22	2012	Toulouse & Montauban	France	7	11	F	Killed by police Four were killed and four were injured at the school	
Mikhail Tselousov (Целоусов, Михаил), 24	Feb 11	1958	Lyamino, Perm Krai	Soviet Union	7	6	F	Sentenced to death and executed	
U Win-maung	March 26	1975	Kachin	Burma	7	5	M	Killed by police	
Wang Xiangjun (王湘军)	April 1	1996	Meitian	China	7	5	M	Arrested	
Goh, One L., 43	April 2	2012	Oakland, California	United States	7	3	F	Sentenced to life imprisonment	
Bekmansurov, Timur Maratovich, 18 (Бекмансуров, Тимур Маратович)	Sep 20	2021	Perm	Russia	6	23	F	Sentenced to life imprisonment	
Lee Chi Hang, 28 (李志衡)	June 3	1982	Sham Shui Po	Hong Kong	6	37	M	Found not guilty by reason of insanity	
Mohammed Ahmad Misleh al-Nazari, 48	March 30	1997	Sana'a	Yemen	6	12	F	Sentenced to death and executed	
Roberts, Charles Carl, 32	Oct 2	2006	Nickel Mines, Pennsylvania	United States	6	4	F	Committed suicide one of the victims died in 2024; attributed to this event	
Fedorenko, Anatoly (Федоренко, Анатолий)	May 19	1977	Leningrad	Soviet Union	6	2	F	Sentenced to death and executed	
Lepnev, Sergei, 18 (Лепнев, Сергей)	March 9	1997	Kamyshin	Russia	6	2	F	Sentenced to death, later changed to life imprisonment, later changed to 25 years in prison	
Wu Moujie, 25 (吴某杰)	July 10	2023	Lianjiang, Guangdong	China	6	1	M	Arrested	
Hale, Aiden, 28	March 27	2023	Nashville, Tennessee	United States	6	1	F	Killed by police One more was injured indirectly	
Purdy, Patrick Edward, 24	Jan 17	1989	Stockton, California	United States	5	32	F A	Committed suicide	
Mohammed Fathi Farhat, 17 (محمد فتحي فرحات)	March 7	2002	Gush Katif, Gaza Strip	Palestine	5	23	F E	Killed by soldiers	
Kazmierczak, Steven Phillip, 27	Feb 14	2008	DeKalb, Illinois	United States	5	17	F	Committed suicide	
Charva, Karel, 34	June 3	1983	Eppstein	West Germany	5	14	F	Committed suicide	
Golden, Andrew Douglas, 11; Johnson, Mitchell Scott, 13	March 24	1998	Jonesboro, Arkansas	United States	5	10	F	Both were imprisoned until their 21st birthday	
Fontaine, Randan Dakota, 17	Jan 22	2016	La Loche, SK	Canada	5	6	F	Sentenced to life imprisonment One of the victims died in 2023; attributed to this event	
Smith, Robert Benjamin, 18	Nov 12	1966	Mesa, Arizona	United States	5	2	MF	Sentenced to life imprisonment	
Kipper Mai, Fabiano, 18	May 4	2021	Saudades	Brazil	5	1	M	Sentenced to 329 years and 4 months in prison	
Spencer, Verlin, 37	May 6	1940	South Pasadena, California	United States	5	1	F	Sentenced to life imprisonment	
Kinkel, Kipland Philip, 15	May 20/21	1998	Springfield, Oregon	United States	4	25	F	Sentenced to 111 years in prison	
Schmidt, Heinz Jakob Friedrich Ernst, 29	June 20	1913	Bremen	Germany	4	21	F	Found not guilty by reason of insanity One more died trying to escape	
Rodrigues Castiglioni, Gabriel, 16	Nov 25	2022	Aracruz	Brazil	4	12	F	Sentenced to 3 years' preventative detention Released in 2025	
Liu Hongwen, 28 (刘红文)	Sep 30	2004	Linwu County	China	4	12	M	Found not guilty by reason of insanity	
De Gelder, Kim, 20	Jan 16/23	2009	Vrasene and Sint-Gillis-bij-Dendermonde	Belgium	4	12	M	Sentenced to life imprisonment	
Houston, Eric Christopher, 20	May 1	1992	Olivehurst, California	United States	4	10	F	Sentenced to death	
Gray, Colt, 14	Sep 4	2024	Winder, Georgia	United States	4	7	F	Sentenced to life imprisonment	
Crumbley, Ethan Robert, 15	Nov 30	2021	Oxford Township, Michigan	United States	4	7	F	Sentenced to life imprisonment	
Henrique de Lima, Luiz, 25	April 5	2023	Blumenau	Brazil	4	5	M	Sentenced to 220 years in prison	
Bayar, Volkan, 37	April 5	2018	Eskişehir	Turkey	4	3	F	Sentenced to life imprisonment	
John II, Griffin, 16	Oct 15	2026	Bend, Oregon	United States	4	2	F	Killed by bystander	
Koryakov, Alexander, 19	Feb 22	1999	Gulbene	Latvia	4	1	M	Sentenced to life imprisonment	
Onyum, Okello Christopher, 39	Apr 2	2026	Kampala	Uganda	4	0	M	Sentenced to death	
Fang Jiantang, 26 (方建堂)	Aug 3	2010	Zibo	China	3–5	6–20	M	Sentenced to death and executed	
Riffo Sandoval, María Jesús, 48	Oct 8	1975	Angol	Chile	3	40	P	Sentenced to 20 years in prison	
“Rod”, 15 “Nash”, 14	June 22	2026	Tacloban	Philippines	3	15	F	Arrested	
Wu Yechang, 25 (吴业昌)	Sep 21	2012	Pingnan County	China	3	13	M	Sentenced to death and executed	
Barbaro, Anthony F., 17	Dec 30	1974	Olean, New York	United States	3	11	F E	Committed suicide while awaiting trial	
Ławrynowicz, Stanisław, 22; Obrapalski, Janusz, 21	May 6	1925	Wilno/Vilnius	Poland (current day Lithuania)	3	9	F E	Both committed suicide	
Neves-Valente, Claudio Manuel, 48	Dec 13/15	2025	Providence, Rhode Island and Brookline, Massachusetts	United States	3	9	F	Committed Suicide	
Solich, Rafael, 15	Sep 28	2004	Carmen de Patagones	Argentina	3	5	F	Declared too young to be prosecuted	
Bishop, Amy, 44	Feb 12	2010	Huntsville, Alabama	United States	3	3	F	Sentenced to life imprisonment	
Lundin Petterson, Anton Niclas, 21	Oct 22	2015	Trollhättan	Sweden	3	2	M	Killed by police	
Labus, Adam, 22	Feb 19	2002	Freising	Germany	3	1	F	Committed suicide.	
Galaviz, Gabriel Alejandro, 20	March 6	2024	Guadalajara	Mexico	3	1	M	Later died by suicide while awaiting trial.	
Arancibia Navarro, Iván Jesus, 47	Dec 17	1999	Valparaíso	Chile	3	0	F	Also attempted suicide. Found not guilty by reason of insanity.	
Flores, Robert Stewart Jr., 41	Oct 28	2002	Tucson, Arizona	United States	3	0	F	Committed suicide.	
Vukalić, Mehmed, 50	Aug 21	2024	Sanski Most	Bosnia and Herzegovina	3	0	F	Also attempted suicide.	
Andrade, Samuel Santana, 14	Oct 18	2024	Heliópolis	Brazil	3	0	F	Committed suicide.	

=== Abbreviations and footnotes ===
The W-column gives a basic description of the weapons used in the murders

F – Firearms and other ranged weapons, especially rifles and handguns, but also bows and crossbows, grenade launchers, flamethrowers, or slingshot
M – Melee weapons, like knives, swords, spears, machetes, axes, clubs, rods, rocks, or bare hands
O – Any other weapons, such as bombs, hand grenades, Molotov cocktails, poison and poisonous gas, as well as vehicle and arson attacks

A – indicates that an arson attack was the only other weapon used
V – indicates that a vehicle was the only other weapon used
E – indicates that explosives of any sort were the only other weapon used
P – indicates that an anaesthetising or deadly substance of any kind was the only other weapon used (includes poisonous gas)

== See also ==
- Attacks on schools during the Gaza war
- List of disasters in the United States by death toll
- List of school shootings in the United States (before 2000)
- List of school shootings in the United States (2000–present)
- List of school-related attacks
- School bullying
- School shooting
- School violence
