= Gîsca school bombing =

School bombing in the USSR on 4 April 1950

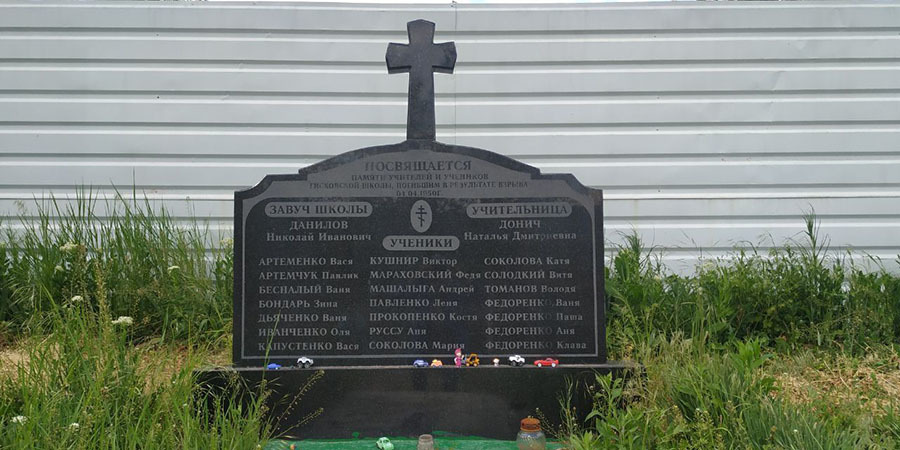
- A memorial for the victims of the bombing, pictured some time in 2007
- Location: 46°46′44″N 29°25′30″E; Gîsca, Moldavian Soviet Socialist Republic, Soviet Union (now Moldova)
- Date: 4 April 1950; 76 years ago
- Target: Natalya Dmitrievna Donicha, a teacher at school N°20 in Gîsca
- Attack type: School bombing; mass murder; suicide attack; murder-suicide
- Weapon: Improvised explosive device
- Deaths: 24 (including the perpetrator)
- Injuries: Unknown
- Perpetrator: Vladimir Georgievich Tatarnikov
- Motive: Unrequited love

On 4 April 1950, 29-year-old Vladimir Georgievich Tatarnikov arrived at School No. 20 in the village of Gîsca, in the Moldavian Soviet Socialist Republic (now Moldova), carrying a suitcase filled with 12 kilograms (26 pounds) of explosives, which he had stolen from his place of work at DOSARM. He then detonated the suitcase, killing twenty-one students, two teachers, and himself.

This event was the first school massacre in the Soviet Union and remains the only school massacre in Moldova.

== Background ==
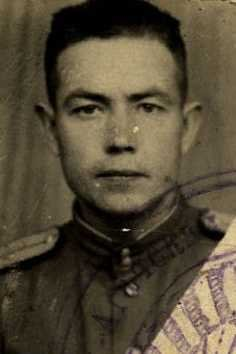
Image of Vladimir Georgievich Tatarnikov, c. 1940

Vladimir Georgievich Tatarnikov (25 July 1920 – 4 April 1950) was born on 25 July 1920, in Tulun, Irkutsk Oblast. Little is known about his early life. In April 1940, he was drafted into the Red Army (RKKA). Once war broke out between Nazi Germany and the Soviet Union in June 1941, Tatarnikov was dispatched to the front, serving in the 3rd Guards Motorized Rifle Regiment. He fought from the beginning of the war until its end, earning the rank of junior reserve lieutenant and receiving a medal for his service.

Upon moving to Bender (Tighina), Tatarnikov sought employment and met with Sedenko, the director of the Bender district department of DOSARM. The organization was later reorganized into DOSAAF by the decree of the Council of Ministers of the USSR in 1951, possibly due to the bombing. He also gained a job as a teacher at school N°20 in Gîsca.

While working at school N°20, Tatarnikov met Natalya Dmitrievna Donich, who had recently relocated to Gîsca with her mother and son. This was in order to live closer to her brother. She was a 5th-grade teacher of Russian, literature, and French at the school. Upon meeting Tatarnikov, she introduced herself as a widow, whose husband had died in the Great Patriotic War.

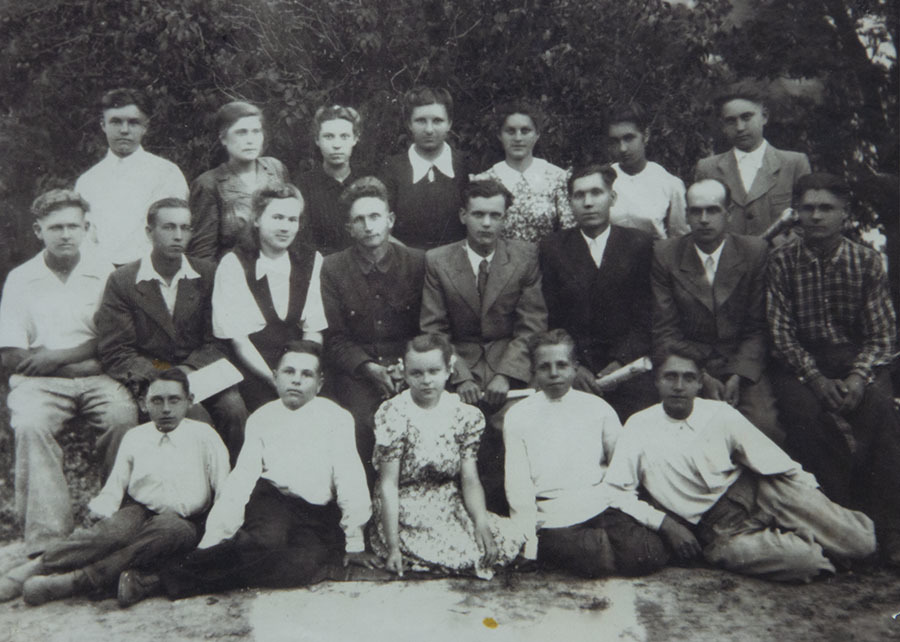
A photo of staff at the school; Natalya Dmitrievna Donich is third to the left on the third row

By the end of 1949, the two had entered a relationship. However, the relationship abruptly ended after it was discovered by Donich that Tatarnikov already had a family in Kazan. After the breakup, Tatarnikov began growing increasingly bitter toward Donich, issuing threats against her. It is possible Tatarnikov began planning the bombing as an act of revenge. A few days before the attack, he stole 12 kilograms (26 pounds) of explosives from the DOSARM warehouse.

On 3 April 1950, a day before the bombing, Tatarnikov held a birthday party at his home, despite his actual birth date being in July. The reason for this is unknown, though it is speculated that he used the occasion as a pretext to lure Donich to his residence in order to carry out his plan. However, she did not attend, and the plan did not proceed that day due to this.

== Bombing ==
On his way, Tatarnikov dropped two letters into a post-box between Donich's house and the school. One was addressed to his ex-wife in Kazan and another to the local authorities. Respectively, they read:

"Goodbye, dear Anya. I am ending my life by suicide. You know the reason. Give my regards to our son Tolya."

"Do not blame anyone for what has happened. I took 12 kg of tola from the warehouse."

A few hours later, Donich was sitting on the windowsill of a classroom, reading to her students, when Tatarnikov entered the room holding a lit match in one hand and the suitcase in the other. He reportedly told the children to leave, but moments later, either deliberately or by accident, the explosives detonated.

== Aftermath ==
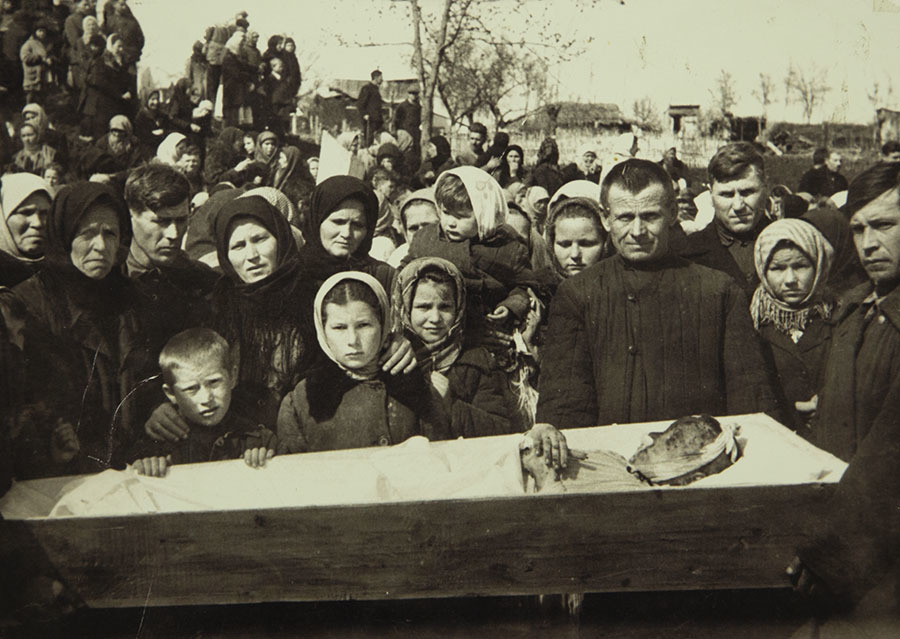
Mourners at a funeral for one of the victims of the bombing

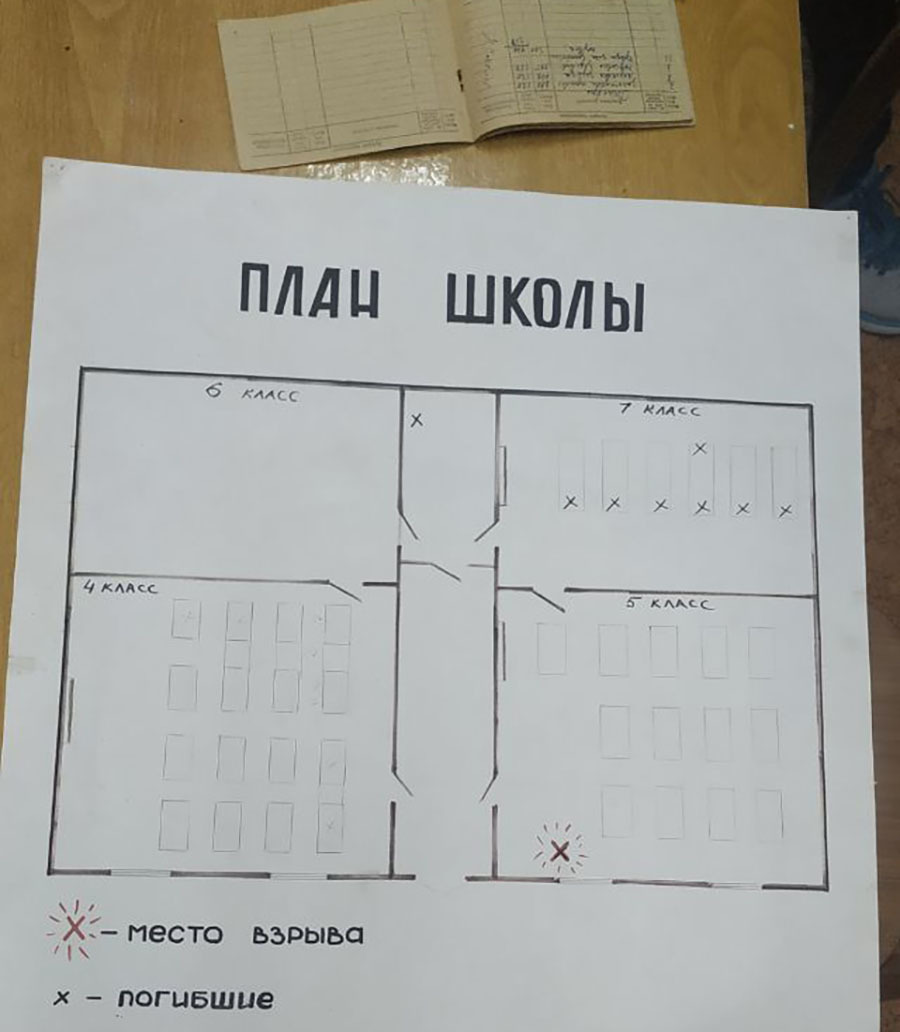
An official diagram of the bombing

Immediately, residents of Gîsca attempted to assist in clearing the rubble for survivors in the school. The wounded were taken to the hospital, and the dead were placed in a row. One 5th-grade student, Kondrat Kulik, was launched out the window and flew 50 meters, landing at the local church. He miraculously survived. Another injured 5th-grade student identified as Ivan died a year later due to complications from his injuries. Remaining students at the school studied in the open air before being transferred to a temporary classroom.

Donich's son was raised by her brother. They eventually left Moldova with Donich's mother. News of the bombing did not reach the wider public until 2005, when Raisa Semyonovna Makarenko, Principal of High School N°20 in Bender, began archiving materials surrounding the event.

== See also ==
- Bath school disaster
- Poe Elementary School bombing
- Jakarta school bombing
