= Nanping school massacre =

School stabbing in Nanping, Fujian, China

Coordinates: 26.6419°N 118.1776°E

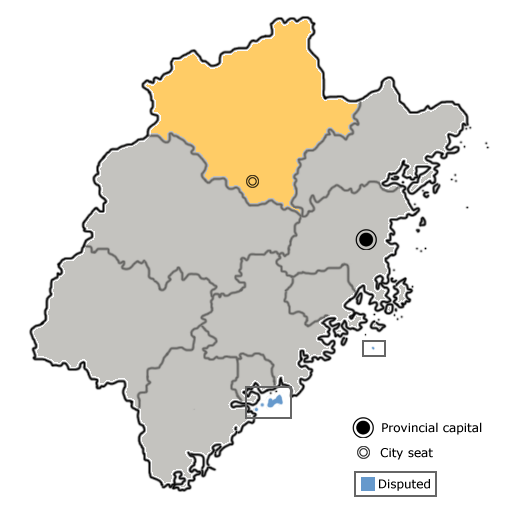
- Nanping's location (in orange) in Fujian Province
- Location: Nanping, People's Republic of China
- Date: 23 March 2010 c. 7:20 am – (UTC+8)
- Attack type: Mass stabbing; child murder; school attack
- Deaths: 8
- Injuries: 5
- Perpetrator: Zheng Minsheng

The Nanping school massacre (Chinese: 福建南平校园惨案) occurred at Nanping City Experimental Elementary School in the city of Nanping, Fujian Province, China, in which a man used a knife to kill eight children and seriously wound five others. The incident occurred on 23 March 2010, around 7:20 am local time. It was the first incident in a string of school attacks in China. The perpetrator later confessed to the crime, telling police investigators that "life was meaningless".

== Incident and casualties ==
The children were attacked outside the gates by a man as they were arriving for school at 7:20 am local time (UTC+8). (Before the attacks, it was the school's practice to keep the gates shut until school began at 7:30 am) The perpetrator was subdued on the scene by three adults. Of the eight fatalities, six died at the scene and the other two later in hospital. The deceased were four boys and four girls.

The school, which at the time had around 2,000 students, closed for the day on 23 March before reopening the following day.

== Perpetrator ==
Zheng in custody

Zheng Minsheng (30 April 1968 – 28 April 2010) who had previously worked as a community doctor, was arrested. The Associated Press reported that, according to a Nanping city government official who refused to be named, Zheng had a history of mental health issues. Zheng later told police that he thought life was meaningless, and confessed to the crime. He was charged with intentional homicide by the province's procuratorate.

At the trial, police stated that Zheng had no history of mental illness, contradicting earlier reports. Zheng said that he committed the attack after being turned down by a girl and suffering "unfair treatment" from the girl's wealthy family. He was found guilty and sentenced to death on 8 April 2010. Zheng was executed by shooting twenty days later.

== Victims ==
The following were victims of the massacre, listed by names in English and Chinese and the grade they were in:

- Ke Cuiting (柯翠婷), grade one
- Chen Chuning (陈楚柠), grade one
- Ouyang Yuhao (欧阳宇豪), grade one
- Huang Shujie (黄舒婕), grade one
- Peng Fei (彭飞), grade two
- Chen Jiahui (陈佳慧), grade three
- Zhou Yuxiao (周雨笑), grade four
- Hou Chuanjie (侯传杰), grade four

== See also ==
- Mizhi County middle school stabbing
- List of school attacks in China
