= 2002 Eching and Freising shootings =

Spree shooting in Bavaria, Germany

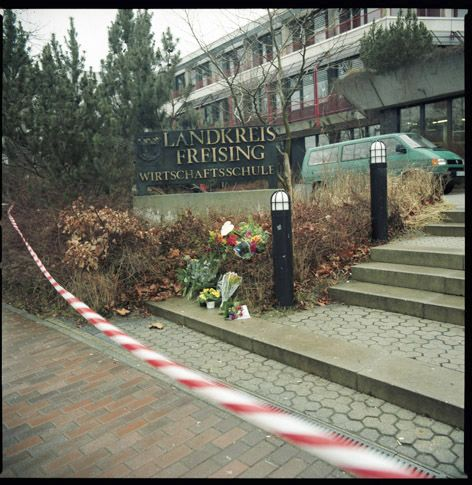
- Business school in Freising on the day of the crime, seen from Wippenhauser Strasse
- Location: Eching and Freising, Bavaria, Germany
- Date: 19 February 2002
- Attack type: Mass murder; Spree shooting; Murder-suicide; School shooting
- Weapons: Zastava M57; Pipe bombs; Hand grenade (unused)
- Deaths: 4 (including the perpetrator)
- Injuries: 1
- Perpetrator: Adam Labus

On 19 February 2002, a spree shooting took place at a packaging plant in Eching and a vocational school in Freising, Bavaria, Germany. Three people were killed and another was seriously injured before the perpetrator, 22-year-old Adam Labus, killed himself.

== Attacks ==
In the morning, Adam Labus shaved his head, dressed in military camouflage clothing, and took a taxi to a contract packager company in Eching that had recently fired him. He had worked there for a year and a half until he was allegedly dismissed for laziness. Once there, he used a Zastava M57 Semi-automatic pistol and a gas pistol to kill the plant director, 38-year-old André Werner, and to shoot foreman Johann Martini, 40, who succumbed to his wounds shortly afterward.

Afterward, Labus took the same taxi to Wirtschaftsschule Freising, where he had attended classes. Inside the main office, he killed the 52-year-old director, Klaus Cislak. He seriously injured a religion teacher. Eventually, Labus committed with a gunshot to the head. In total, ten gunshots had been fired and three pipe bombs were detonated. A handgrenade was also found on Labus.

Police were unable to recover the body because they suspected there were other weapons or explosive devices in Labus's backpack. The body was removed from the school by a demolition team.

== Perpetrator ==
Adam Labus was born in Zabrze, Poland in August 1979. He moved with his family to Germany in 1988. He struggled to adapt to his new surroundings. He repeatedly attracted attention by stealing bicycles and had numerous run-ins with the police. Labus was considered rebellious, brash, and a poor student in school. Teachers later recalled that Labus had threatened staff, saying "Ich werde Sie alle erschießen" ("I'll shoot you all"). After leaving school, Labus underwent psychiatric treatment in 1995; he escaped from a Munich clinic at that time. He later participated in a rehabilitation project on the North Sea coast in Denmark. Labus, who was already wearing camouflage clothing at the time, had attempted to rob a gas station. Labus began collecting weapons and enlisted in the Bundeswehr. However, he was released early for stealing medication.

== Investigation ==
Investigators surmised that the motive was revenge for being fired a few days beforehand. Labus had also been investigated for robbery and fraud.

Due to his appearance and clothing, the Erding police could not rule out that Labus sympathized with the neo-Nazi scene; a far-right attitude was evident in the 22-year-old. However, the Upper Bavarian police stated there was no indication of Labus participating in far-right activity.

The Munich tabloid tz published a letter signed "Heil H..." that Labus allegedly sent to a friend in October 1996.

Researcher Lothar Adler, medical director of the Hainich Ecumenical Clinic in Mühlhausen, diagnosed him as typical of an impulsive person, weary of life, "psychosocially isolated and unsuccessful." Adler said that Labus wanting to attack his former teachers was unsurprising, saying "For many, the school years are a time of insults. So the school becomes a place of attack." In the end, the police also accepted this motive, with an investigator saying "it all seems like revenge against his perceived enemies". Police ruled out a far-right motive initially assumed.

According to a report by Spiegel Online, Labus had wanted to enlist as a mercenary in Kosovo a few years earlier, but was turned away at the Croatian border, intercepted by soldiers.

== Aftermath ==
A candlelight procession and ecumenical mass were held at Freising Cathedral. Classes for students at the business school resumed that same week, but the school building remained closed due to the investigation. The students were relocated to the neighboring technical high school. This school was also indirectly affected by the attack. Since it was not possible to determine the perpetrator's whereabouts during the crime, appropriate lockdown measures were also taken there. However, when it became clear that the perpetrator had not been at the school, the business school was left closed for a few days.

The Minister-President of Bavaria, Edmund Stoiber (CSU), expressed his condolences to the families of the victims on behalf of the entire cabinet. Otto Schily (SPD) announced that the "terrible event" was not "appropriate to target the large number of legal gun owners."

According to the Bavarian Finance Ministry, six teachers reported a workplace accident after the massacre. The ministry stated that all were at the school, but some only learned of the attack after leaving the building. All these cases were recognized as workplace accidents.

Four months later, the teacher Labus actually wanted to shoot received an anonymous death threat: "You can laugh again, we will hunt you down, we will kill you," the letter read, signed "the heirs of Adam."
