= Bremen school shooting =

School shooting in Bremen, Germany

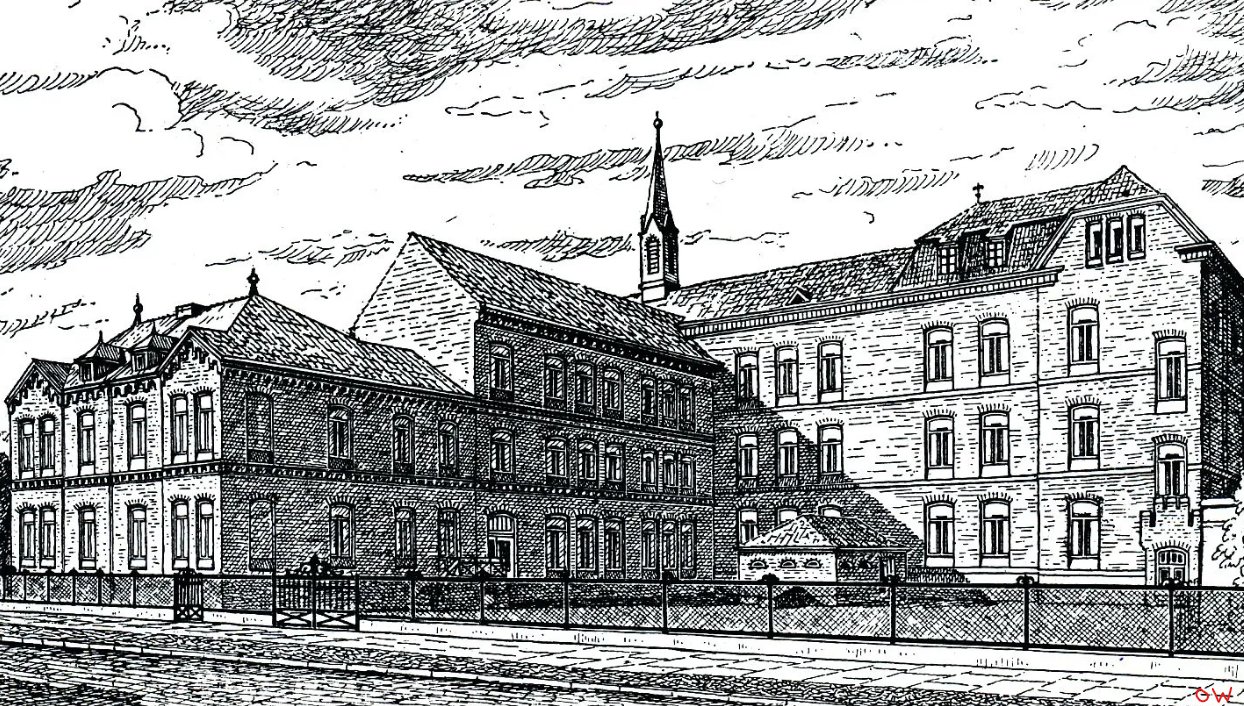
- St Mary's Catholic School in 1913
- Location: Bremen, Germany
- Date: 20 June 1913; 11:00 a.m.
- Attack type: School shooting, mass murder, mass shooting
- Weapon: Six to ten handguns (including a Browning M1900)
- Deaths: 5 (4 directly)
- Injuries: 21
- Perpetrator: Heinz Schmidt
- Motive: Mental illness

The Bremen school shooting was a school shooting that occurred on 20 June 1913 at St Mary's Catholic School (St-Marien-Schule) in Walle, a district of Bremen, Germany. The gunman, 29-year-old unemployed teacher Heinz Schmidt from Sülze, indiscriminately shot at students and teachers, killing five girls and wounding more than 20 other people before being subdued by school staff. He was never tried for the crime and sent directly to an asylum where he died in 1932.

== Shooting ==
At approximately 11:00 a.m. Heinz Schmidt entered St. Mary's Catholic School, carrying a briefcase packed with six to ten pistols (either revolvers or semi-automatics: sources vary) and about 1000 rounds of ammunition, which he had bought several weeks before the shooting. Because of the large number of rounds, the owner of the gun shop where Schmidt had bought his arsenal contacted the police, though the incident was not found to be important and not investigated further.

In the hallway on the first floor, Schmidt encountered Marie Pohl, a teacher at the school, who was stepping out of classroom 8b, and, seeing his agitated appearance, questioned him about his business at school. Without answer, Schmidt proceeded to shoot at her, barely missing her head. While Miss Pohl fled into a classroom nearby Schmidt entered room 8b, which was occupied by 65 girls, most of them being 6 or 7 years old, and immediately began firing at them. Also shooting at the children after they hid under their desks, the gunman instantly killed two of them and wounded another 15. When the girls fled out of the classroom, Schmidt followed them, still shooting. While trying to escape, one of the girls fell down the stairs, broke her neck and died.

The gunman then went back and unsuccessfully tried to enter another classroom that had been locked by a teacher who had realized what had been happening. Schmidt shot the school janitor, Butz, who attempted to apprehend him, hitting him in the face, before going upstairs where he was tackled by teacher Hubert Möllmann. When Schmidt managed to break free from Möllmann's grip, he shot the teacher twice, hitting him in the stomach and shoulder, whereupon he proceeded to shoot out of a window at the children in the schoolyard, injuring five boys. The shots also wounded a roofer working nearby, who, with his colleagues and other people alarmed by the shooting, rushed into the school building. However, as they arrived on the first floor, the gunman had already been subdued by janitor Butz and a teacher named Hartlage. When Schmidt was led away by police, he was met by an angry crowd outside, which beat him up and attempted to lynch him, until the police officers managed to hold the mob at bay with their sabres.

In total, Schmidt had fired 35 rounds, three girls died instantly, while two more later succumbed to their wounds – the last victim dying some time in mid-July – and 18 children, as well as three other persons were injured.

== Victims ==
Five schoolgirls had died in the shooting, one indirectly:

- Anna Kubica, 7
- Sophie Gornisiewicz, 6, died by falling down the stairs
- Elsa Maria Herrmann, 7
- Elfriede Höger, 5, died four weeks after the shooting
- Maria Anna Rychlik, 8

More than 30,000 people attended the funeral procession when the girls were brought to the cemetery. Kaiser Wilhelm who was on parade, was interrupted during it. When he heard about the shooting, he rescheduled the parade, along with all the last kings, highest leaders, and nobles. They were among the 30,000 in the funeral procession. After that, he passed tougher gun laws with the Reichstag.

== Perpetrator ==
Heinz Jakob Friedrich Ernst Schmidt was born in Sülze on 24 September 1883. He worked as a teacher at a school in Stolp until May 1912, when he had to quit due to a mental breakdown. After a stay at a sanatorium and having to quit another job afterwards he went to Bremen in December the same year. People later described him as an odd and shy person.

According to letters he had written, Schmidt felt strong resentments against the Jesuits, calling them a danger to the German people and holding them responsible for the death of his father, a Protestant pastor, who had died the day before the shooting. Schmidt was examined at the St Jürgen-asylum in Ellen, where he was ruled not mentally competent to stand trial. He remained there until 31 March 1932 when he died of tuberculosis.

== See also ==
- List of rampage killers (school massacres)
- Ernst August Wagner, teacher who killed 14 people on 4 September 1913
