= 2023 University of Nevada, Las Vegas shooting =

Mass shooting in Nevada, U.S.

University of Nevada, Las Vegas shooting
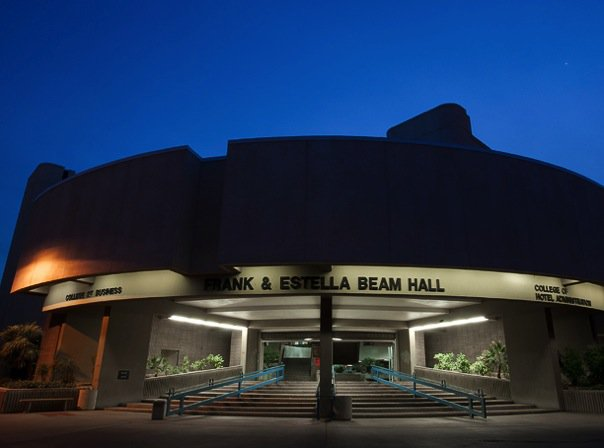
- The Frank and Estella Beam Hall at the University of Nevada, Las Vegas, the scene of the shooting
- Location: 36.10779°N 115.14376°W; University of Nevada, Las Vegas; Paradise, Nevada, U.S.
- Date: December 6, 2023; 2 years ago c. 11:45 a.m. - 11:55 a.m. PST
- Attack type: School shooting, mass shooting, shootout
- Weapon: 9mm Taurus PT92 semi-automatic pistol
- Deaths: 4 (including the perpetrator)
- Injuries: 3
- Perpetrator: Anthony James Polito
- Motive: Job rejection from UNLV

On December 6, 2023, a mass shooting occurred at the University of Nevada, Las Vegas (UNLV). Three people were killed, and three additional people were wounded. Two of the wounded were police officers. The perpetrator was 67-year-old Anthony James Polito, a former East Carolina University professor who applied to work for UNLV a year earlier but was rejected. He was killed in a shootout with police. It is the deadliest school shooting in Nevada history.

== Background ==
The Frank and Estella Beam Hall is one of UNLV's instructional buildings and the primary building for the Lee Business School. The shooting occurred about three miles (5 km) from the Mandalay Bay casino, which six years earlier was the site of the deadliest mass shooting in modern American history.

== Shooting ==
Anthony "Tony" Polito arrived at the UNLV campus at around 11:30 a.m. PST and was armed with a legally purchased Taurus 9mm handgun and 11 loaded magazines. Fifteen minutes later, the Las Vegas Metropolitan Police Department received a call about a shooter in the Frank and Estella Beam Hall. Officers reportedly entered the hall after about a minute from the first 911 call. The shooter reportedly started on the fourth floor of the hall and made his way down several other floors. A witness in the hall said that he and others were confused after an alarm went off in the building, but evacuated after hearing someone scream "there's a gun".

Eight minutes later, UNLV posted a Twitter message that police were responding to reports of gunshots, warning students at the Beam Hall to "evacuate to a safe area." Approximately twenty minutes later, the university reported additional gunshots at the Student Union building.

At around 11:55 a.m., Polito exited the building, and was killed in a shootout with police. He was shot six times in the face, neck, chest, abdomen, elbow, and leg, and an autopsy found that he had erectile dysfunction medication and oxycodone in his system.

== Victims ==
Three faculty members were killed and another faculty member was wounded during the shooting. Two of those killed were faculty members at the Lee Business School: Patricia Navarro-Velez, Accounting Professor, aged 39, and Cha Jan (Jerry) Chang, MIS Professor, aged 64. The third victim, Naoko Takemaru, aged 69, was an associate professor of Japanese Studies at UNLV's College of Liberal Arts.

The wounded faculty member was identified as a 38-year-old visiting professor who sustained critical injuries. His condition was downgraded to "life threatening" the day after the attack. On September 10th, 2024, the victim was officially identified as Professor Bot Rith at a campuswide meeting to start the new academic year. Two police officers sustained minor wounds during a shootout with the perpetrator. Some people were also treated after suffering panic attacks.

== Perpetrator ==
Anthony James "Tony" Polito (c. 1956 – December 6, 2023) was identified as the shooter. He was raised in North Carolina and had served as a tenured associate professor of business at East Carolina University in Greenville, North Carolina from 2001 to 2017. Afterward, Polito moved to Nevada where he served later on as an adjunct professor of business at Roseman University of Health Sciences in Henderson, Nevada from 2018 to 2022. He had applied to be a professor at various schools throughout Nevada, including UNLV, but all his applications were unsuccessful. According to his former employers, Polito resigned from East Carolina University as a tenured associate professor, and lost his job at Roseman when the school discontinued the Master of Business Administration program in which he taught. In his CV, Polito listed another stint with East Carolina University (1992–1994), as well as five years with the University of Georgia (1994–1999), two years with the University of Northern Iowa from (1999–2001), and a semester with Brenau University (1999), all working as a professor of business.

Polito maintained a "target list" of people against whom he was seeking retribution, including colleagues from his former employer, East Carolina University. Police confirmed that none of the victims of the shooting were on the "target list".

Past students at East Carolina claimed that he fixated on negative reviews by students on the website Rate My Professors and would claim to know who they were and point out specific seats in the classroom. Polito was very active on social media, with online writings showing an interest in Las Vegas, the state of Nevada and conspiracy theories. He posted on his personal website conspiracy theories focusing on Powerful Organizations Bent on Global Domination, with the Trilateral Commission being an example of one such organization. He was a member of the high-IQ society Mensa International.

== Investigation ==
The Federal Bureau of Investigation and the Bureau of Alcohol, Tobacco, Firearms and Explosives assisted local police. The Las Vegas Metropolitan Police Department, University Police Services, the United States Marshals Service, and the FBI investigated the shooting. An investigation of his apartment found ammunition and an eviction notice, and removed several computers and hard drive components. About two dozen letters were identified as mailed by Polito shortly before the shooting to multiple university personnel across the country. Some of the letters were identified as containing harmless white powder, such as talc.

== Aftermath ==
UNLV established a reunification center in the north hall of the Las Vegas Convention Center and an emergency hotline. Administrators canceled classes for the rest of the week after the shooting and began a conversation about how to proceed with finals that had been set to start the week after the shooting. By December 8, UNLV President Keith Whitfield had announced that in-person classes for the rest of 2023 and the semester finals were canceled, due to the physical and emotional trauma that the campus had suffered.

The College of Southern Nevada closed its campuses. Interstate 15 was closed to allow access for first responders. The UNLV Runnin' Rebels basketball game against the Dayton Flyers was canceled. A ground stop was issued at nearby Harry Reid International Airport due to a security incident.

== Reactions ==
White House Press Secretary Karine Jean-Pierre stated that the federal government was monitoring the shooting. President Joe Biden was previously scheduled to visit Las Vegas days later. The Mayor of Las Vegas, Carolyn Goodman, called the shooting "tragic and heartbreaking" in a tweet, stating that she was "praying for everyone on campus as law enforcement responds to the situation." Senators Jacky Rosen and Catherine Cortez Masto urged constituents to avoid the area.

The president of the American Association of University Professors, Irene Mulvey, issued a statement mourning the victims who died in "senseless violence", and calling for gun reform. This statement was echoed by the president of the American Federation of Teachers, Randi Weingarten, as well as the Nevada Faculty Alliance. They decried the violence and called for gun reform.

On the day of the shooting, the Vegas Golden Knights stood in a moment of silence prior to their game against the St. Louis Blues at T-Mobile Arena. Four days following the shooting, the Golden Knights honored the victims of the shooting in a ceremony prior to their game against the San Jose Sharks. The Golden Knights wore special T-shirts during walk-ins to honor the victims, as well as their families. The team also wore special helmet decals during the game, and offered a moment of silence.

Due to the shooting, the National Finals Rodeo cancelled the event's kickoff scheduled for December 7, 2023, and participated in a moment of silence on December 8, 2023.

The Las Vegas Raiders observed a moment of silence prior to kickoff during a game against the Minnesota Vikings on December 10, 2023. Maxx Crosby carried a UNLV flag to the midfield to fly next to the flag of the United States of America.

== See also ==
- South Pasadena Junior High School shooting
- 2023 Michigan State University shooting
- List of school shootings in the United States by death toll
- List of mass shootings in the United States in 2023
- List of school shootings in the United States (2000–present)
- List of homicides in Nevada
