= 1940 South Pasadena shootings =

Spree shooting in California, U.S.

- Primary crime scenes: Site of the school district headquarters shooting (1), Site of the South Pasadena Junior High School shooting (2)
- Location: 34.10854°N 118.14997°W; South Pasadena, California, U.S.
- Date: May 6, 1940; 86 years ago 2:15 p.m. (UTC−08:00)
- Target: Board members of the South Pasadena Unified School District; Staff at South Pasadena Junior High School
- Attack type: Mass shooting; mass murder; school shooting; spree shooting
- Weapon: .22-caliber Colt Woodsman semi-automatic pistol
- Deaths: 5
- Injuries: 2 (including the perpetrator)
- Perpetrator: Verlin Spencer
- Motive: Substance abuse, delusions of persecution
- Verdict: Pleaded guilty
- Convictions: 5 counts of first-degree murder, 1 count of attempted first-degree murder
- Sentence: 5 consecutive life sentences with the possibility of parole after 7 years

On May 6, 1940, recently dismissed 37-year-old principal Verlin Spencer killed three of his former colleagues at the South Pasadena Unified School District headquarters. He then drove to South Pasadena Junior High School (now South Pasadena Middle School), where he murdered two additional staff members before shooting himself in the abdomen and being arrested. The incident was considered the deadliest school shooting in the United States since 1900 until the University of Texas tower shooting in 1966.

On July 29, 1940, Spencer pleaded guilty to five counts of first-degree murder and one count of attempted first-degree murder. He was sentenced to five consecutive life sentences with the possibility of parole. Spencer had initially entered a plea of not guilty by reason of insanity. He was paroled in 1970, and spent his remaining years in Hawaii, helping rehabilitate former convicts until his death in 1991.

== Shooting ==
At approximately 2:15 p.m. on May 6, 1940, Spencer arrived at the now-demolished South Pasadena Unified School District headquarters at 1327 Diamond Avenue. A scheduled meeting regarding his disputed dismissal as principal was set to take place there. Armed with a .22-caliber Colt Woodsman semi-automatic pistol, Spencer entered the administrative offices where the meeting was to occur, and shot dead three district officials.

After killing the three men, Spencer fled the building: as he exited, he encountered 30-year-old school board secretary Dorothy Talbert, who attempted to hide beneath her desk. Spencer shot her in the shoulder as she sought cover, leaving her permanently paralyzed. Talbert described Spencer as firing with “lightning precision.” As he fled the scene, students from the nearby South Pasadena High School - unaware of the shootings - helped him jump-start his car, which had a dead battery.

Spencer then drove three blocks to South Pasadena Junior High School. Upon entering the building, he shot art teachers 35-year-old Verner V. Vanderlip and 45-year-old Ruth Barnett Sturgeon. Reports indicated that he had forced Vanderlip into the school's basement. Vanderlip died at the scene, while Sturgeon succumbed to her injuries on May 9, 1940.

When police arrived at the school, they cornered Spencer in the empty school cafeteria: he then turned the gun on himself and fired into his torso, though the wound caused only minor injury. Multiple initial news reports mistakenly claimed that Spencer had died from the self-inflicted gunshot.

Casualties

At the school district headquarters:

- George Bush (53, superintendent)
- John E. Alman (50, principal of South Pasadena High School)
- William R. Speer (43, business manager of the South Pasadena Unified School District)
- Dorothy Talbert (30, secretary; wounded)

At South Pasadena Junior High School:

- Verner V. Vanderlip (35, manual arts instructor)
- Ruth Barnett Sturgeon (45, art teacher)

=== Aftermath ===
Author John Church was in Pasadena at the time of the shooting, an experience he later recounted in his 1996 book Pasadena Cowboy: Growing Up in Southern California and Montana, 1925–1947. Groups of students reportedly searched the school for Spencer or additional victims, and eventually found the body of Verner V. Vanderlip at the bottom of the basement stairs. Dorothy Talbert and Ruth Barnett Sturgeon were rushed to Huntington Hospital after being discovered, with Sturgeon later dying of her injuries.

== Perpetrator ==
Verlin H. Spencer (December 28, 1902 - January 11, 1991) was born in Colorado to Edna R. Bloss and an unknown father. Aside from the fact that his parents divorced at an unspecified time, little is known about his early life. He later moved to Ventura, California.

While living in Ventura, Spencer met a woman named Mildred Pollock, whom he married in 1931. The couple relocated to South Pasadena in 1933 when Spencer was 30, and his mother eventually moved in with them. In South Pasadena, he began work at South Pasadena Junior High School, though his perfectionism and strict administrative style reportedly caused friction among the staff. Ruth Barnett Sturgeon was a member of staff that Spencer notably disliked.

In 1939, Spencer allegedly suffered a nervous breakdown. This was possibly linked to chronic headaches he was experiencing. As a result, Superintendent Bush placed him on an involuntary three-week leave of absence. The break did little to help; upon returning, Spencer developed a persecution complex. He also began carrying the pistol later used in the attack in his car. He was reportedly an avid gun collector who frequently practiced at local shooting ranges.

On April 30, 1940, Spencer was suspended from his position - a decision he strongly contested. A meeting to discuss the matter was scheduled for May 6 at the South Pasadena Unified School District headquarters, the day the shooting occurred.

=== Legal proceedings and incarceration ===
On July 29, 1940, Spencer pleaded guilty to five counts of first-degree murder. In the months leading up to this, he had entered a plea of not guilty by reason of insanity, but ultimately changed his plea after being called to trial before Judge Thomas L. Ambrose. This shift may have been influenced by the discovery of a note Spencer had written stating that he was of “right mind” and leaving his home to his wife - evidence that could have undermined his insanity defence.

Spencer was sentenced to five life terms with the possibility of parole beginning in 1947 and was incarcerated at San Quentin Rehabilitation Center. However, residents of South Pasadena contested each parole hearing, fearful that Spencer was still a danger to society.

Three years into his sentence, a doctor at County-USC Medical Center reported that immediately after the shooting, Spencer had exhibited extremely high levels of bromide - an over-the-counter sedative - within his bloodstream. Authorities eventually concluded that the drug's influence had contributed to the attack, leading to Spencer being declared not guilty for his actions. Despite this finding, he remained in custody. Sometime after the California Medical Facility opened in 1955, Spencer was transferred there.

While incarcerated, Spencer worked as a teacher for other inmates. At night, he devoted himself to writing numerous legal appeals. In 1968, one of these appeals succeeded when it was noted that his attorney had failed to raise the insanity defence during Spencer's final hearing, prompting a new trial. During that proceeding, it was determined that Spencer would be paroled in 1970 on the condition that he could not return to California.

=== Post release ===
After his release, Spencer moved to Hawaii, where he worked to help rehabilitate former convicts. He continued this work until his death on January 11, 1991, at the age of 88. Despite his previous condition to not return to California, his resting place would be documented as San Diego.

== See also ==
- 2023 University of Nevada, Las Vegas shooting; a school shooting in 2023 which occurred under similar circumstances
- 1966 Rose-Mar College of Beauty shooting
