= Wilno school massacre =

1925 school shooting

Joachim Lelewel high school massacre
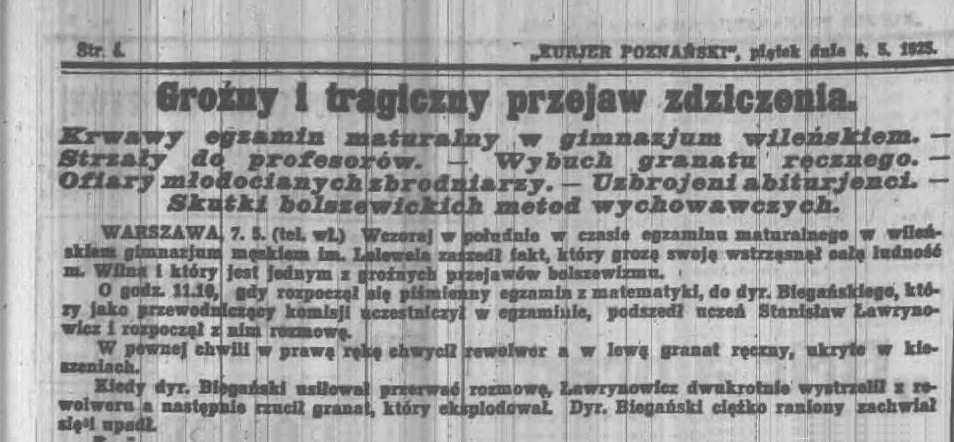
- Press clip from Kurjer Poznański, 8 May 1925, Poland, with information about the massacre
- Location: 54°41′19.2″N 25°16′10.7″E; Wilno, Poland (now Vilnius, Lithuania)
- Date: 6 May 1925; 11 a.m.
- Attack type: School shooting, school bombing
- Weapons: Revolvers, grenades, bomb
- Deaths: 5 (including both perpetrators)
- Injuries: 10
- Perpetrators: Stanisław Ławrynowicz and Janusz Obrąbalski
- Motive: Communism

The Wilno school massacre was a school shooting that occurred on 6 May 1925 at the Joachim Lelewel High School in Wilno, Second Polish Republic. During the final exams, at about 11 a.m., at least two eighth-grade students attacked the board of examiners with revolvers and hand grenades, killing two students, one teacher, and themselves.

It was the first-ever school shooting that took place in Poland, preceding the Janikowo school shooting in 1 April 1936, the Kluczbork School of Economics shooting on December 16, 2001 and the Brześć Kujawski school shooting on May 27, 2019.

== Attack ==
Various accounts of the incident were reported by the newspapers worldwide. That the students were in possession of military grade weapons suggests that they might have been in contact with the illegal Soviet agents deployed to Poland for sabotage and espionage operations.

The article in British daily Times stated that two students, identified as Stanisław Ławrynowicz and Janusz Obrąbalski, per Polish sources, were involved in the incident. According to the article, Ławrynowicz, who was a member of an organisation that supported Józef Piłsudski, began shooting at the teachers with a revolver after being told that he had failed exams, whereupon other students tried to disarm him. Ławrynowicz then dropped a hand grenade which killed him and several other students. Immediately after this Obrąbalski, his friend, rose from his place and fired several shots at the teachers, wounding a professor and several students, before throwing a hand grenade, which failed to explode. He then committed suicide. Including the perpetrators themselves, five persons were killed, one of them a professor. Six students, as well as the headmaster, were wounded.

According to an article in the Neue Freie Presse three students carried out the attack, who were identified as Stanislaus Lawrynowicz, Janusz Obrembalski and Thaddäus Domanski, who was also named Ormanski in other reports. The newspaper reported that Lawrynowicz fired several shots at principal Bieganski, after most of the students had refused to take part at the exams, while at the same time Obrembalski began shooting at the teachers. Domanski then tried to throw a bomb into the group of teachers, which slipped out of his hands and exploded at his feet, killing himself, as well as the two other attackers, and a fourth student named Zagorski. Principal Bieganski was mortally wounded in the attack and Professor Jankowski, as well as seven other students were gravely injured.

An investigation revealed that the students had established a Communist youth organization to counter the principal's strict management of the school. The members of this organization had met one day before the exams in a tavern to discuss their further actions.

Another likely motive was the bad mental state of both perpetrators, who were unable to adapt to the school lifestyle after the war experiences: Ławrynowicz took an active part in the Polish-Soviet War, while Obrąbalski lost all his family possessions as a result. A bomb was later found in one classroom, large enough to blow up the school building.

== See also ==
- Vera Kharuzhaya, Soviet agent deployed to Poland for sabotage and espionage during the interbellum
- List of school-related attacks
