= Shiguan kindergarten attack =

2006 mass murder in Gongyi, Henan, China

- Bai Ningyang
- Location: Shiguan, Henan, China
- Date: 8 May 2006; 9:00 a.m.
- Target: Kindergarten
- Attack type: Arson
- Deaths: 12
- Injuries: 5
- Perpetrator: Bai Ningyang

The Shiguan kindergarten attack took place at a kindergarten in Shiguan village in Gongyi, Henan, China, on 8 May 2006. At about 9:00 that morning, 18-year-old Bai Ningyang entered a classroom on the second floor of the kindergarten, which was reportedly operating illegally. Inside were 21 children and a female teacher, who, according to locals, had rejected his advances. Threatening them with a knife, Bai forced the entire class to the back of the room. He then locked the door and poured gasoline from two bottles on the floor before setting it on fire and escaping. He told one child, whose parents he knew, to leave. Two five-year-old children died at the scene, ten more succumbed to their wounds in hospital, and four others, as well as the teacher, were injured.

The next day, during an extensive search operation involving 800 police officers, Bai was found hiding in a cave in the nearby mountains and arrested.

Two days prior to the attack, on 6 May, Bai had had a quarrel with a farmer who had stopped him when using a newly paved road. Later that day, he armed himself with two knives and chased the man through the village. When his father tried to intervene, he took a five-year-old boy hostage, though the child managed to free himself, whereupon Bai ran away.

Bai was sentenced to death in December 2007.

== See also ==
- List of school attacks in China
