= Sanski Most school shooting =

2024 school shooting in Bosnia and Herzegovina

- Location: 44°46′4″N 16°39′27″E; Sanski Most Gymasium, Sanski Most, Una-Sana Canton, Bosnia and Herzegovina
- Date: 21 August 2024; 2 years ago c. 10:15
- Attack type: School shooting, mass shooting, mass murder
- Weapon: Automatic rifle
- Deaths: 3
- Injuries: 1 (the perpetrator)
- Perpetrator: Mehemed Vukalić
- Motive: Disputed: Retaliation for arguments with the school management (alleged by peers); Delirium caused by post-traumatic stress disorder (self-declared)
- Convictions: Aggravated murder (3 counts); Illegal possession of weapons
- Sentence: 42 years' imprisonment

On 21 August 2024, a school shooting occurred inside the Sanski Most Gymnasium, located in Sanski Most, Bosnia and Herzegovina. Mehemed Vukalić, a 62-year-old school janitor, killed three school employees with an automatic rifle before attempting suicide by gunshot. In November 2025, Vukalić was sentenced to 42 years' imprisonment for the attack.

== Background ==
Small arms and weapons have been frequently trafficked in the Balkans since the Yugoslav Wars. Per a 2010 study executed by the United Nations Development Programme, there were around 750,000 illegally owned weapons in Bosnia and Herzegovina. Mass shootings are a relatively rare occurrence in the Balkans, but they had lately seen a small rise, including the Daruvar shooting in neighboring Croatia and the Mladenovac and Smederevo shootings and Belgrade school shooting, both in neighboring Serbia.

== Shooting ==
At around 10:15 a.m. on 21 August 2024, a janitor arrived at the school on his off-day after driving his wife to work. The suspect had returned home to retrieve an automatic rifle owned by his father and two ammunition magazines, smuggling them into the school building in a water pipe. He entered the first floor offices of the school's director and a secretary, killing both with multiple gunshots. The suspect returned to the ground floor, where he shot an English teacher. Afterwards, he attempted to commit suicide by shooting himself in the chest. He survived his self-inflicted wound and was taken into custody.

Some school employees reported that the suspect had entered into disputes with the school management and was suffering from post-traumatic stress disorder after serving in the Yugoslav People's Army.

== Victims ==
The deceased victims were identified as:

- Nijaz Halilović (born 1961), school director
- Gordana Midžan (born 1959), English teacher
- Nisveta Kljunić (born 1959), secretary

== Aftermath ==
A day after the shooting, Vukalić was in stable condition after undergoing surgery.

A three-day period of mourning was declared in Sanski Most because of the shooting.

On 18 December 2024, Vukalić pleaded not guilty to three counts of aggravated murder and one count of illegal possession of weapons. In September 2025, his trial began at Bihać Cantonal Court. In his testimony, the suspect claimed to have little memory of the shooting and that he had been feeling a noise and tingling in his head. The suspect described feeling in "delirium" with memory gaps, such as taking the gun from home and walking through the school, stating he made the suicide attempt in regret of his actions after regaining full awareness. He also issued an apology and said he had heard a voice telling him to hurry, which prompted a psychological evaluation. In October 2025, two psychological assessors stated that the defendant was mentally impaired at the time of the shooting. Families of the victims disputed the neutrality of this claim.

On 17 November 2025, Vukalić was sentenced to 42 years imprisonment.
