= 2024 Heliópolis school shooting =

2024 mass shooting in Brazil

Heliópolis school shooting
- Location: Heliópolis, Bahia, Brazil
- Date: October 18, 2024; 2 years ago c. 16:30 (UTC−03:00)
- Target: Students
- Attack type: School shooting, mass shooting, murder–suicide
- Weapon: .38-caliber revolver
- Deaths: 4 (including the perpetrator)
- Injuries: 0
- Perpetrator: Samuel Santana Andrade
- Motive: Under investigation

The Heliópolis school shooting was a school shooting that occurred on 18 October 2024 at Escola Municipal Dom Pedro I in Serra dos Correias, Heliópolis, Bahia, Brazil. The attack resulted in the deaths of three students, all aged 15, and the 14-year-old perpetrator, who committed suicide at the scene.

== Background ==
Escola Municipal Dom Pedro I is a public school in a small village in northern Bahia, primarily serving students from surrounding rural communities. Prior to the attack, the perpetrator, Samuel Santana Andrade, was reported to be an exemplary student without any publicly known behavioral issues.

== Shooting ==
On the afternoon of 18 October 2024, Samuel Santana Andrade brought a .38-caliber revolver to his classroom. During an art class, he opened fire on three classmates: Adriele Vitória Silva Ferreira, Fernanda Sousa Gama, and Jonathan Gama dos Santos, all aged 15. After killing them, he turned the gun on himself and died at the scene.

== Aftermath ==
The attack prompted an official three-day mourning period in Bahia, with local authorities providing psychological support to students, families, and teachers. Schools in the municipal network were temporarily closed. Investigations into the origin and ownership of the weapon are ongoing.

== See also ==
- List of school-related attacks
- List of school attacks in Brazil
