= Anne Anne Kindergarten stabbing =

1982 mass murder in Hong Kong

- Location: Un Chau Street Estate, Sham Shui Po, Kowloon, Hong Kong
- Date: 3 June 1982; 1:30 p.m.
- Attack type: Mass stabbing, mass murder, school stabbing
- Weapons: Two knives Two chisels
- Deaths: 6
- Injuries: 38 (including the perpetrator)
- Perpetrator: Lee Chi-hang
- Motive: Schizophrenia

The Anne Anne Kindergarten stabbing was a mass stabbing which occurred in Kowloon, Hong Kong on 3 June 1982. After killing his mother and sister in their flat in Un Chau Street Estate, and also wounding two other women, 28-year-old Lee Chi-hang (李志衡; lei5 zi3 hang4) entered Anne Anne Kindergarten and stabbed 34 children, killing four of them, and also injured several other people, before he was arrested by police. Lee was found to be insane and was placed in a mental institution.

== Incident ==
At around 1:30 pm, Lee stabbed his mother and sister in their flat, Room 5274, Block 8, Un Chau Street Estate. They later died in the hospital. Armed with two knives with eight-inch blades and two chisels, Lee ran downstairs, stabbing two sisters in the stairwell on the way, and fled to the Anne Anne Kindergarten (安安幼稚園), located on the ground floor of Block 9, Un Chau Estate. He entered the kindergarten, where 60 children between three and four years of age were having a singing lesson, and immediately began slashing and stabbing the children, leaving 34 of them wounded, six of them with their arms nearly severed, and four with fatal injuries.

One of the teachers shouted "follow me" to the students, causing many to run outside. She ran to the estate's neighbourhood policing unit on the ground floor of Block 10 for help. Two police officers arrived at the scene. Lee fled to the playground, where he stabbed constable Chan Kin Ming in the chest. Ignoring the injured policeman's orders to drop his weapons, Lee continued stabbing at passers-by, wounding two men and a woman and wounding a 14-year-old boy before Chan stopped him with a shot to the left arm and stomach.

A total of 38 injured children were taken to Caritas Medical Centre while the injured police constable was taken to Princess Margaret Hospital. Chief Secretary Philip Haddon-Cave and other government officials, who had coincidentally been visiting the nearby Cheung Sha Wan fish market, arrived soon after to inspect the scene and offer condolences.

== Victims ==
=== Killed ===
- Leung Lai-kuen (梁麗娟; loeng4 lai6 gyun1), female, 48, Lee's mother
- Lee Shiu-kam (李少芹; lei5 siu2 kan4), female, 17, Lee's sister
- Fung Kin-kwok (馮建國; fung4 gin3 gwok3), female, 3
- Tai Kai-lam (戴啟南; daai3 kai2 naam4), female, 3
- Lo Wing-sze (盧詠詩; lou4 wing6 si1), male, 4
- Kwan Pui-yen (關沛恩; gwaan1 pui3 jan1), female, 5

=== Wounded ===
- Two women (Kwong Sin Ngan 鄺新恩 and Kwong Sin Chun 鄺新哲)
- 30 unnamed children, ages 3 and 4
- Constable Chan Kin-ming (陳建明; can4 gin3 ming4)
- Two unnamed men
- Chau Fung-kiet (周峰傑; zau1 fung1 git6)
- Unnamed boy, 14

== Perpetrator ==
Lee, who was diagnosed with schizophrenia, was the son of Lee Chiu-wing (李士榮) and Leung Lai-kuen. According to his father, he was a silent boy who did poorly in school, showed strange behaviour, and spoke incoherently. In 1976, he was admitted to Castle Peak Hospital, a mental institution, for six months, after fighting with a neighbour. He subsequently received treatment at the Yaumatei Psychiatric Centre. Lee frequently had depression and threatened to kill his parents during an argument in January 1979. In the time prior to the stabbing, he was unemployed and was said to have appeared emotionally unstable.

== Aftermath ==
After the stabbing, security measures at nursery schools were upgraded, and it was made compulsory for discharged patients of mental institutions to regularly attend psychiatric out-patient clinics.

Lee was charged with six counts of murder, and in April 1983 he was sentenced to be detained in a mental hospital for an unspecified period. As of January 1998 he was still being held at the Siu Lam Psychiatric Centre in Tuen Mun.

== In popular culture ==
The 1986 film The Lunatics by Derek Yee is based on the incident.
