= Collège Édouard-Pailleron fire =

1973 Paris arson

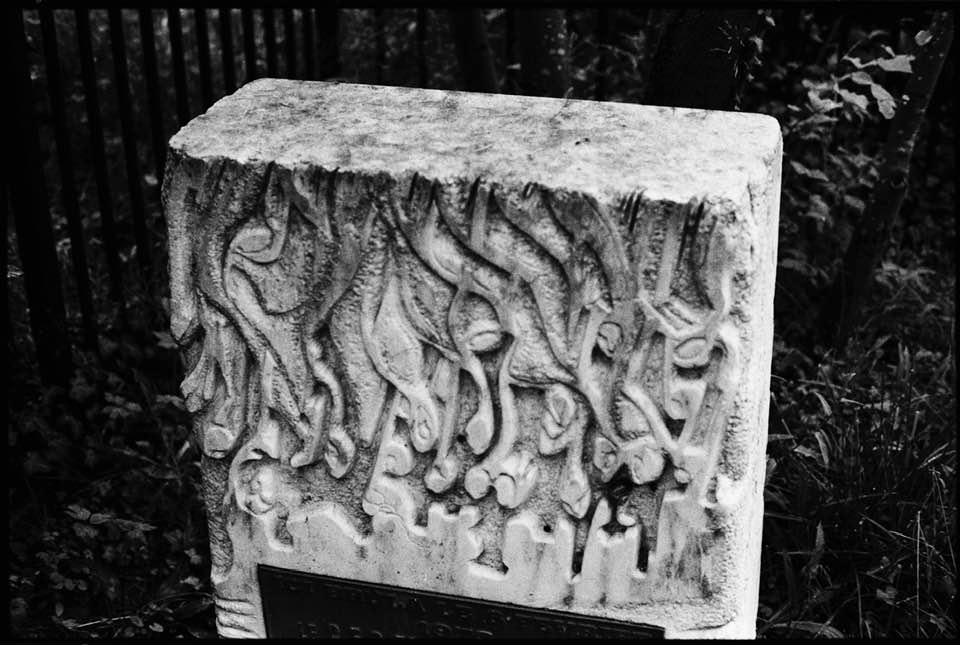
- A commemorative stele to the fire at the Collège Édouard-Pailleron
- Date: February 6, 1973
- Venue: Collège Édouard-Pailleron
- Location: 19th arrondissement of Paris, Paris, France; 48.8817°N 2.3796°E
- Type: Fire
- Cause: Arson
- Deaths: 21
- Injuries: Unknown
- Convicted: Patrick (14); Marc (14)
- Charges: Arson, complicity
- Verdict: Guilty
- Sentence: Five years in prison for Patrick and four years in prison for Marc

On 6 February 1973 a fire started by two disgruntled students at the Collège Édouard-Pailleron in Paris, France completely destroyed the building and caused the death of 21 people, including 16 children.

== Background ==
The Collège Édouard-Pailleron is a public secondary education institution. In France, Collèges are for students in the first four years of secondary education from ages 11 to 14. It is named after Rue Édouard-Pailleron, the street that it is located on which is, in turn, named after Édouard Pailleron, a French playwright and poet.

=== Construction ===
The building was built at the end of the 1960s in order to accommodate the children of the baby boom. The four-story school was built in a technique using metal beams which is called a Pailleron type or pailleron. A total of 58 middle schools and 10 high schools of the same type were built around the same time in France. The school was built with multiple empty areas in the structure that acted as draft chimneys, this, along with the polystyrene panels that the building was equipped with, led to the fire spreading at a rapid rate and creating thick toxic smoke in very large quantities. Additionally, the staircases were situated only at the ends, and were not aligned on every floor, but offset every two floors. Due to this, to move between floors that did not have a staircase directly connected to them, one often had to walk along the whole length of the building.

== Fire ==
At 7:40 PM on the fated Tuesday, two pupils, Patrick and Marc – whose last names were never given to the press owing to them being minors – set fire to a wastepaper bin sprayed with two liters of white spirit as revenge against the management of the school. Believing the school unoccupied, they were unaware that the school was being used that evening by the music conservatory, which was giving classes there for the first time. After four minutes, the fire led to a power outage as it continued to spread through the false ceilings of the building.

At the time, 36 students and teachers from the music conservatory were on the third floor of the school. During the fire, a teacher managed to get children out onto an adjacent roof by breaking a window with chairs and helping them down using a ladder brought by a mechanic from the street. He then returned to the building to help his colleagues. He was among the victims, as were two other music teachers, the college caretaker – who was pregnant – and 16 children. Firefighters arrived four minutes after the start of the fire, but were unable to enter the building, which was already completely engulfed in flames.

== Aftermath ==
On February 10, four days after the fire, equipment was sent in to clear rubble and demolish what was left of the building. Concerned about the destruction of potential evidence this would cause, local residents formed a human chain to stop earthmoving vehicles from leaving. Relatives of the victims contacted the judge in charge of the investigation through their lawyer, who ordered the destruction to be stopped. The bodies of the victims were identified after several days using dental records and jewelry and a chapelle ardente was set up in a town hall. Funerals were held in the neighbourhood's churches and synagogues.

A few days following the fire, the two pupils responsible for the fire confessed. Patrick admitted to purchasing the white spirit from a local grocery store and starting the fire, while Marc admitted to being complicit. Patrick told police that he had started the fire because he was angry with being put in a class for troubled students by teachers. The boys were sent to Fresnes Prison, with Patrick being charged with arson and Marc being charged with "complicity". The trial verdict was reached on 10 November 1977, and they were sentenced to four and five years in prison respectively, with their parents made to pay compensation to the families.

In 1979, a second verdict was handed down concerning other defendants: four people were acquitted; three senior officials, the builder of the school and its architect were sentenced to suspended prison terms but were later amnestied. As a consequence of the fire rules for the construction of school buildings were modified and fire alarm sirens and compulsory evacuation drills were introduced in all schools in France. The school was rebuilt in 1979 and is still operational.
