= Kyanguli school fire =

2001 school dormitory fire in Kenya

- Location: Machakos District, Kenya
- Date: 25 March 2001; 25 years ago 1:00 a.m.
- Target: Kyanguli Secondary School
- Deaths: 67
- Injuries: 19 (including one of the perpetrators)
- Perpetrators: Davis Onyango Opiyo; Felix Mambo Ngumbao

The Kyanguli Fire Tragedy occurred on the night of 25 March 2001 when a dormitory at Kyanguli Secondary School in Machakos District, Kenya, was set on fire in an act of arson by two 16-year-old students of the school. Sixty-seven people died in the incident and another 19 were injured, including one of the perpetrators.

== Background ==
In early March 2001, Davis Onyango Opiyo (also reported as Davies Otieno Onyango in some sources), then a 16-year-old form 3 student, approached Felix Mambo Ngumbao with a plan to burn down a dormitory in the school. Opiyo told Ngumbao that he, like many students in the school, did not like the new principal, David Mutiso Kiilu. Top of the list of complaints against the new administration was the low quality of food that they said was being provided. Some of the survivors later said that they suspected the administration's demands for unpaid school fees as well as a decision to cancel KCSE results over cheating by the Ministry of Education may have contributed to the tragedy. On 24 March, while the rest of the school were at a sporting event, the two boys bought 15 litres of petrol at a nearby filling station. That night, some students reported a smell of petrol originating in one of the dormitories, though the source was not found during a search by the principal, the head boy, and the night guard.

Prior to the tragedy, there had been an unsuccessful attempt to torch the principal's office and the library. There had also been notes circulated in the school calling for a strike against the administration but the student body seemed not to be bothered by the call.

== The fire ==
At around 1 am on 25 March, students were woken up by screams and fire from the dormitory. The night guard on duty later reported that that night, he spotted someone with a flash light near the dormitory. When he stopped the student, he realized that it was Felix Ngumbao. When questioned by the guard, Ngumbao said that he had gone to fetch water. The deputy principal also narrated that on the same night, he bumped into Ngumbao, took his admission number for punishment then let him go. The dormitory had a capacity of 130. A padlock on the main door as well as metal barriers placed on the windows prevented the students from escaping.

== Legal action ==
On 9 April 2001, Ngumbao and Opiyo were arraigned in court. They were charged with murder. The trial lasted nearly two years. In Ngumbao's written statement to the court, he admitted to contributing towards the purchase of the petrol but denied taking part in the arson. He said that he, too, like the other students, was woken up by screams.

Ngumbao initially confessed to taking part in the entire plot but later retracted his statement saying that he had given it under duress from police officers in Athi River. Judge Robert Mutitu, however, questioned why the suspects never brought this to his attention or that of the magistrate or the OCPD Athi River.

After two years of court proceedings, Judge Mutitu resigned from office. This was part of a government clean up of judges who had been implicated in various corruption scandals, an operation dubbed 'radical surgery'. Justice Nicholas Ombija took over the case. Ombija terminated the case on 4 December 2006 terming it a mistrial since Mutitu was being probed for corruption. It is unclear what finally happened to the perpetrators after this.

== Aftermath ==
The school still retains the same name. The site of the burnt dormitory is no more and has been replaced by a grass lawn and timber, which serves as a memorial park. Fifty-eight of the students were buried in six mass graves in the school compound. On 3 March 2016, Justice Joseph Sergon of the High Court awarded parents of the victims KSh 40,900,000/=. Each family was to receive 650,000/= for pain and suffering. In his ruling, Justice Sergon said that the school, in its capacity as an agent of the state, had failed to prevent the fire, even though there had been two earlier attempts to set the school on fire.

Kyanguli Bereaved Parents Disaster Self-Care Group was formed after the tragedy to help bereaved parents deal with the psychological challenges of the tragedy.

On 24 February 2017, the parents held a protest in Machakos town against the amount that had been awarded as well as failure by their lawyer, Kioko Kilukumi, to effect the payments.

In July 2019, the government released 54,000,000/= as compensation to the bereaved families. Each family received 857,000/=.

The Kenya government has neither issued an official statement on the tragedy nor given an official explanation on the trial.

Multiple other cases of school arson have since been reported in Kenya, often perpetrated by students with similar motives to Ngumbao and Opiyo, such as frustration with the school system or specific teachers. The Kyanguli fire tragedy remains the deadliest of all.
