= Lee Business School =

Business school of the University of Nevada, Las Vegas

Coordinates: 36.106803°N 115.138434°W

- Type: Public
- Established: 1967
- Parent institution: University of Nevada, Las Vegas
- Dean: Gerry Sanders
- Academic staff: 85
- Students: 4000
- Postgraduates: 500
- Location: Las Vegas, NV, USA
- Campus: Urban
- Website: unlv.edu/business

The Lee Business School is the business school at the University of Nevada, Las Vegas (UNLV). It holds international dual accreditation in business and accounting by the Association to Advance Collegiate Schools of Business (AACSB). The Lee Business School is one of the largest colleges at UNLV and offers ten undergraduate majors, 14 minors and seven graduate programs.

== History ==
Established in 1967 as the College of Business and Economics, the now Lee Business School is one of the largest schools at UNLV with approximately 3,500 undergraduate students, 500 graduate students, and 100 faculty and staff and offers the only AACSB accredited business program in Southern Nevada. The school offers ten undergraduate majors, 14 minors and seven graduate degrees. Lee Business School is among the top 5 percent of business colleges and schools worldwide to hold international dual accreditation in business and accounting by the Association to Advance Collegiate Schools of Business (AACSB), the premier accrediting body for business and management education. In addition to its scholastic endeavors, Lee Business School is home to three centers that bring together faculty and students with business and industry. These include the Troesh Center for Entrepreneurship and Innovation, Center for Business and Economic Research (CBER), and Lied Center for Real Estate. With more than 21,000 graduates, the Lee Business School Alumni Chapter is the largest alumni chapter on campus. In 2011, Ted and Doris Lee donated $15 million to the UNLV College of Business, which was subsequently renamed the Lee Business School.

== Graduate programs ==
The Lee Business School offers the traditional MBA, Executive MBA, and part-time MBA degrees. MBA Concentrations include: Finance, Marketing, Health Care Management, New Venture Management, and Human Resource Management. Dual degrees are offered are: MBA/MS Hotel Administration, MBA/MS in Management Information Systems, MBA/MS in Quantitative Finance, MBA/Doctor of Dental Medicine, MBA/Juris Doctor, MBA/MS Civil and Environmental Engineering, MBA/MS Computer Science, MBA/Doctor of Medicine. Students may also complete dual degrees with the MBA and the JD, DMD, MS in Hotel Administration, or MS in Management Information Systems. The school also offers a Graduate Certificate in New Venture Management.

== Rankings ==
Business school rankings

U.S. MBA Rankings
- Bloomberg (2025): NR
- U.S. News & World Report (2026): NR

Global MBA Rankings
- FT (2026): NR

The Lee Business School MBA program was ranked #89 for 2022 by U.S. News & World Report for Part-time MBA programs.

== See also ==
- List of United States business school rankings
- List of business schools in the United States
