= 2012 HUB Mall shooting =

Workplace shooting

- Location: HUB Mall, University of Alberta, Edmonton, Alberta, Canada
- Date: June 15, 2012; 12:12 a.m. (MDT)
- Attack type: Armed robbery; workplace shooting; heist; school shooting; mass shooting
- Weapon: .38-calibre revolver
- Deaths: 3
- Injuries: 1
- Perpetrator: Travis Baumgartner
- Motive: Robbery

On June 15, 2012, 21-year-old security guard Travis Baumgartner, an employee of G4S Cash Solutions, shot four of his coworkers, three fatally, in the HUB Mall building on the campus of University of Alberta in Edmonton, Alberta, Canada. He stole his employer's armored truck and money, and gave the cash or left it at the homes of his mother and two friends. Baumgartner was arrested the next day in British Columbia, as he made plans to cross the U.S. border.

On September 9, 2013, Baumgartner pleaded guilty of three counts of murder, and on September 11, 2013, was sentenced to life in prison without the chance of parole for forty years, one of the longest or strictest prison sentences imposed on anyone in modern Canadian history.

== Details ==
=== Shooting ===
Several minutes into midnight, Baumgartner perpetrated the crime while on duty at HUB Mall, a student residence and indoor food court, during a routine circuit with four coworkers to replenish ATMs around the city of Edmonton, as a part of their employment with G4S Cash Solutions. While refilling the TD ATMs, Baumgartner shot three of his coworkers with a .38-calibre revolver as they entered the secured vault located behind the machines, before locking them inside. He then approached the armored car they were using and shot and killed another co-worker. All of the four victims were shot in the back of the heads, at point blank range. He then stole the vehicle and fled the scene.

Three of the workers died at the scene.

Brian Ilesic, 35

Edgardo "Eddie" Rejano, 39

Michelle Shegelski, 26

A fourth guard, Matthew Schuman, was severely injured in the shootings, sustaining brain injuries.

=== Capture ===
A manhunt ensued as Baumgartner fled Edmonton, dropping off money for his two friends and mother. While at a friend's home, Baumgartner destroyed his cell phone so that it could not be used to track him. After eventually hearing news reports in the media, both friends notified police and returned the money. Baumgartner left $64,000 on his mother's kitchen table, and then left the Edmonton area. He swapped his licence plate for one from his mother's vehicle and drove away, heading west to the resort town of Banff. There, he threw his weapon and vest into a river, and headed to the United States border, supposedly to Seattle, Washington. On June 16, 2012, 4:08 p.m. MDT (Edmonton time), Baumgartner was arrested by U.S. Customs and Border Protection while he was trying to cross the border at the Port of Lynden near Langley, British Columbia with $333,580 in cash.

== Travis Baumgartner ==
At the time of the shooting, Travis Brandon Baumgartner (born May 16, 1991) was living in Sherwood Park, Alberta with his mother. Baumgartner had been hired by G4S Cash Solutions two months prior to the attack, and had no known disciplinary problems there. It is a requirement from the security agency to obtain a federal firearms licence, which includes a background check being run on the applicant.

On June 1, 2012, Baumgartner posted the following status post on his Facebook account: “I wonder if I’d make the six o’clock news if I just started popping people off.” According to a friend, Baumgartner would tell him that he would rob his coworkers, in a jokingly manner. In a police interview, Baumgartner told a detective he did not get along with his coworkers, and that people at his workplace would ridicule him.

At the time of the shooting, Baumgartner had 26 cents in his bank account and owed $58,000 to his mother and two friends, due to debt over the purchase of a car and other items, and that he felt he needed to owe money to a friend due to years of being "forked over" money by him.

== Trial and sentencing ==
Several days after the killings, Baumgartner confessed to an undercover Royal Canadian Mounted Police officer in a British Columbia jail cell, saying: “I did it all. I killed those people and robbed their truck.” On June 20, Baumgartner was flown in a RCMP aircraft to Edmonton, where he was taken into Edmonton Remand Centre. The next day, Baumgartner appeared in court and was charged with three counts of first-degree murder, one count of attempted murder, and four counts of robbery with a weapon.

On September 9, 2013, Baumgartner pleaded guilty to the one charge of first-degree murder, for the death of Rejano, two counts of second-degree murder for the deaths of Ilesic and Shegelski, and a single charge of attempted murder. On September 11, he was sentenced by Associate Chief Justice John Rooke to life in prison without the possibility of parole for 40 years, until 2052. At the time of Baumgartner's sentencing, it was the harshest sentence imposed on anyone in the history of the Canadian judicial system since 1962, when Arthur Lucas and Ronald Turpin were executed in Toronto for capital murder convictions in separate cases.
