= Wirtschaftsschule (Bavaria) =

Type of school in Bavaria, Germany

The Wirtschaftsschule (English: Economy School or Commercial School) is one of different types of public school in the German Federal State of Bavaria. Wirtschaftschule students are normally between 13 and 16 years of age and study a variety of traditional academic subjects, and receive training specifically geared towards a future career in business.

== General information ==
Pupils in the Wirtschaftsschule attend classes there for two to four years. The Wirtschaftsschule is unique to the Bavarian educational system, and students fall out of sync with the traditional system of education as a consequence of enrolling in this type of school. Students in the 'Gymnasium' and 'Realschule' track often are able to transfer to the Wirtschaftschule program.

Admission is granted when the student has successfully gained the necessary qualifications from the 'Hauptschule', or after an assessment of their suitability to enter. This generally takes the form of a three-day assessment specializing in German and Mathematics.

The Wirtschaftsschule programs end after the tenth year of schooling or for students of the two-year program after the eleventh year. Thus, the four-year program begins after the sixth year, the three-year program after the seventh year, and the two-year program after the eighth year.

== Graduation ==
Successful graduates of the school have the length of their training shortened by a year in many occupations.

Upon successful completion of the curriculum, students receive a "Mittlerer Schulabschluss", which is comparable to the British GCSE.

== Choice of academic program ==
At the eight academic year, students generally have a choice between focusing on business-related and on technical and mathematical subjects for the duration of their study.

Students can choose between the H pathway (100% economic focus) and the M pathway (mathematical and technical focus).

=== Academic courses in the H pathway ===
Academic courses in the H pathway are

1. Economics

- Business Studies (compulsory)
- National and International Economy (compulsory in year 10)
- Accounting & Financial Reporting (compulsory)
- Financial and Business Mathematics (compulsory in year 8)
- Mathematics (optionally after successful completion of year 8)

2. Languages

- German Language (compulsory)
- English Language (compulsory)
- Spanish Language (optionally)
- French Language (optionally)

3. Information Technology

- Data Processing (compulsory in years 8 and 9)
- Word Processing (compulsory)

4. General Education

- Religious Education or Philosophy & Ethics (one of both is compulsory)
- Physical Education (compulsory)
- Social Sciences (compulsory in years 9 and 10)
- History (compulsory)
- Arts (compulsory in years 7, 8 and 9)

5. Natural Sciences

- Geography (compulsory in years 7, 8 and 9)
- Biology (compulsory in year 7)

6. Other

- Project Work (compulsory in years 9 and 10)
- Practical Business Training (compulsory in years 9 and 10)

=== Academic courses in the M pathway ===
Academic courses in the M pathway are

1. Economics

- Business Studies (compulsory)
- National and International Economy (compulsory in year 10)
- Accounting & Financial Reporting (compulsory)
- Financial and Business Mathematics (compulsory in year 8)
- Mathematics (compulsory)

2. Natural Sciences

- Geography (compulsory in year 8)
- Biology (compulsory in year 7)
- Physics (compulsory)

3. Languages

- German Language (compulsory)
- English Language (compulsory)
- Spanish Language (optionally)
- French Language (optionally)

4. Information Technology

- Data Processing (compulsory in years 8 and 9)
- Word Processing (compulsory)

5. General Education

- Religious Education or Philosophy & Ethics (one of both is compulsory)
- Physical Education (compulsory)
- Social Sciences (compulsory in years 9 and 10)
- History (compulsory)
- Arts (compulsory in years 7, 8 and 9)

6. Other

- Project Work (compulsory in years 9 and 10)
- Practical Business Training (compulsory in years 9 and 10)
