= Gulbene kindergarten massacre =

Infamous attack and worst mass murder in Latvian history

- Location: Gulbene, Latvia
- Date: February 22, 1999; 12:00 - 1:30 p.m. (EET)
- Attack type: Mass stabbing
- Weapons: Meat cleaver; Knife; Axe
- Deaths: 4
- Injuries: 1
- Perpetrator: Alexander Koryakov
- Motive: Notoriety

On 22 February 1999, at a kindergarten in Gulbene, Latvia, three young girls and a teacher were killed, and a nurse was injured when a 19-year-old man, Alexander Koryakov, entered the school armed with a knife and a cleaver during the children's midday nap. The suspect, Alexander Koryakov was a 19-year-old unemployed man from the Gulbene area. He had reportedly been inquiring about the kindergarten's security measures in the days leading up to the attack, raising suspicions among staff.

Koryakov reportedly committed the attack to gain notoriety and had premeditated the murders. He was later sentenced to life imprisonment.

== Attack ==
On 22 February 1999, a 19-year-old man named Alexander Koryakov entered the Gulbene kindergarten during the children's midday nap period, around 12:00–1:00 p.m.

Koryakov was armed with a knife and a cleaver and attacked the sleeping children and a teacher. Three girls aged approximately 4–6 and a teacher were killed, receiving a total of 39 stab and chop wounds. A nurse was injured but survived while attempting to intervene.

According to Koryakov's own statement, the attack was premeditated and motivated by a desire to gain notoriety.

== Victims ==
The attack claimed the lives of three young girls and one teacher. According to Latvian retrospectives:

- Viktorija Rožina (4 years old)
- Olga Kazačenoka (5 years old)
- Anastasija Černova (6 years old)
- Anželika Žvīgure, teacher (31 years old)

A nurse present in the room was also injured while attempting to protect the children, but survived the attack.

== Aftermath ==
The killings shocked Latvia and prompted a national discussion on school safety. The government approved emergency funds to assist the town with funeral and condolence expenses. President Guntis Ulmanis publicly condemned the murders, calling them among the worst acts of violence in recent Latvian memory.

The tragedy led to renewed attention on security measures in kindergartens and schools, including better supervision during nap times and stricter access controls to prevent unauthorized individuals from entering.

== Trial ==
Koryakov was arrested immediately after the attack as he attempted to flee the area.

The trial began on 29 November 1999 at the Vidzeme District Court. Koryakov admitted to planning and committing the murders, and was found criminally responsible. On 7 December 1999, he was sentenced to life imprisonment in accordance with Latvian law.

During the trial, prosecutors emphasized the premeditated nature of the attack and the extreme brutality of the crimes, which caused widespread shock in Latvia and prompted a national discussion on school safety.

As of 2019, Koryakov was still serving his life sentence and had only ever received one interview in prison, the host of which refused to release it publicly so as to avoid letting him achieve his goal of gaining infamy.
