= Gîsca =

Gîsca Гиска
- Village
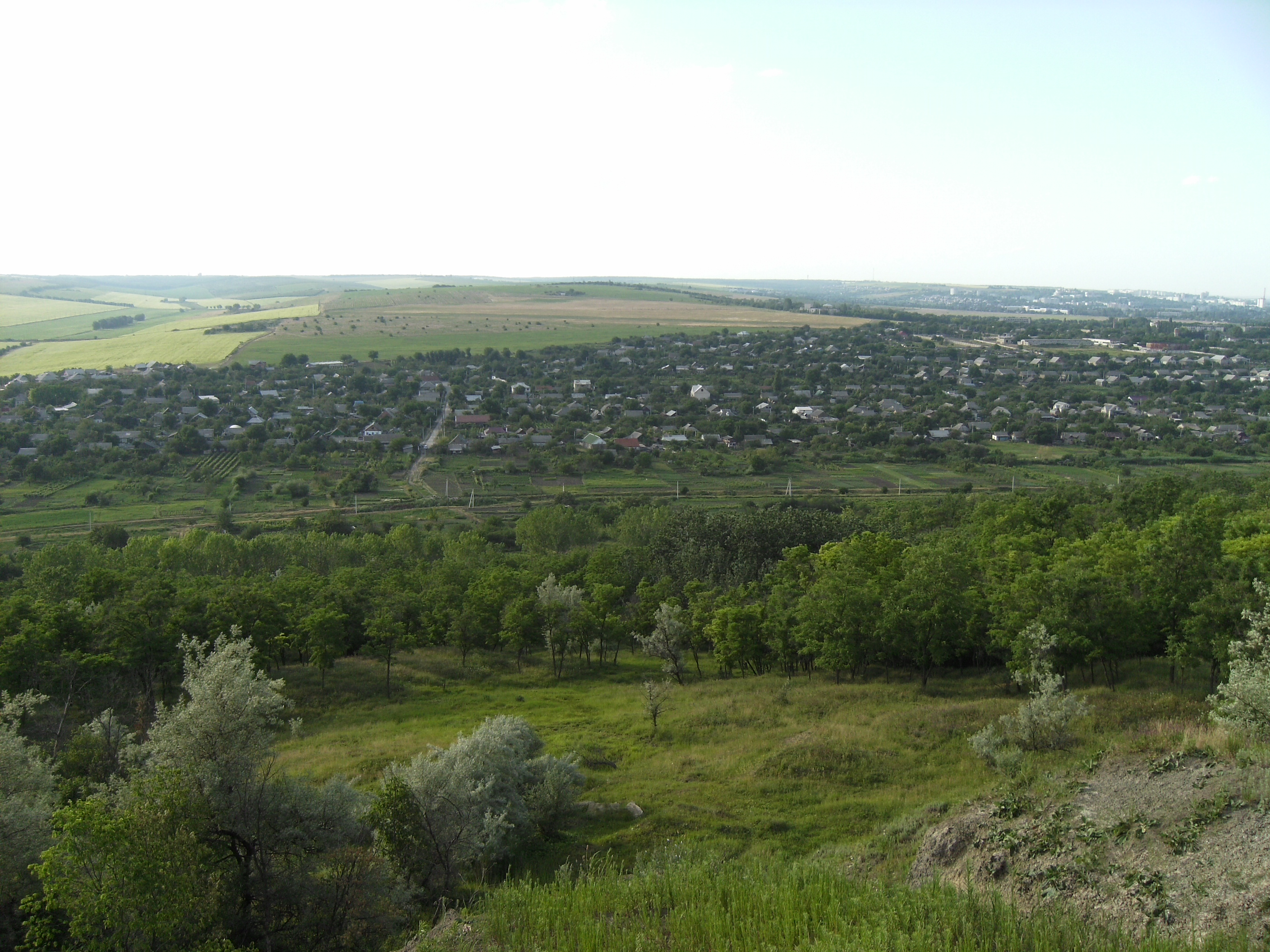

- Location within Moldova
- Coordinates: 46°46′44″N 29°25′30″E
- Country (de jure): Moldova
- District (de jure): Căușeni
- Country (de facto): Transnistria
- Municipality (de facto): Bender

Government
  - Mayor: Valerii Covcean (Валерий Алексеевич Ковчан)
- Elevation: 16 m (52 ft)

Population (2004)
  - Total: 4,400
- Time zone: UTC+2 (EET)
  - Summer (DST): UTC+3 (EEST)
- Postal code: MD-3200
- Climate: Cfb

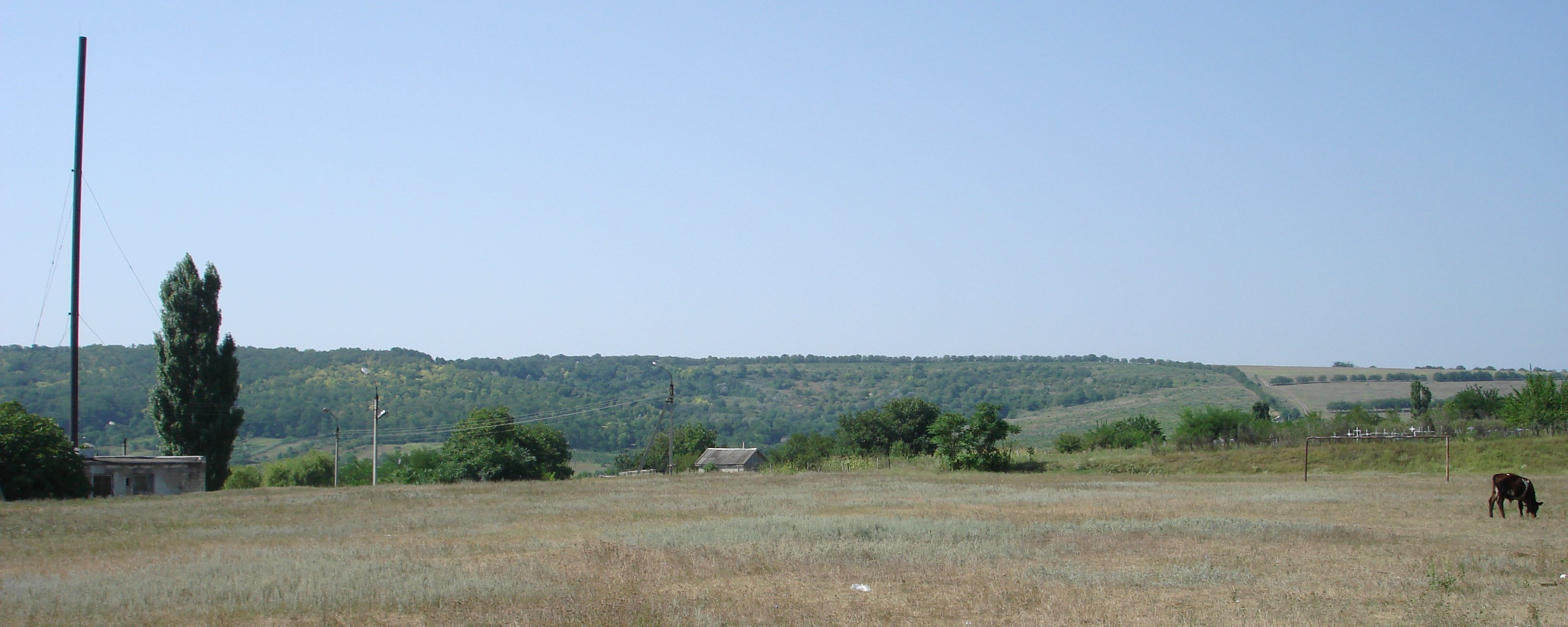
Landscape near Gîsca

Gîsca (Romanian for 'goose'; Moldovan Cyrillic and Russian: Гыска, romanized: Gyska) is a village near in Căușeni District, Moldova, under the control of the breakaway Transnistrian authorities. It is composed of a single village with the same name, population 4,841 at the 2004 Census. The locality, although situated on the right (western) bank of the river Dniester, immediately to the south-west of the city of Tighina (Bender), in the Bessarabian, not Transnistrian part of Moldova.

The village is located around a creek named Gîrla, which flows into the Dniester. The creek is small and not navigable, but it is the habitat of ducks and geese, which gave the name to the locality. The road south-west from the city of Tighina (Bender) follows into the Moldovan-controlled area immediately as the village of Gîsca ends, and the next village of Fîrlădeni starts.

The Gîsca school bombing took place in the village on 4 April 1950, killing 23 people and the perpetrator.

At the census organized by the Transnistrian authorities in 2004, there were 4,841 inhabitants in Gîsca, including 819 (16.91%) ethnic Moldovans, 2,956 (61.06%) ethnic Russians, 719 (14.85%) ethnic Ukrainians, 168 (3.47%) ethnic Bulgarians, 91 (1.88%) ethnic Gagauzians, 22 (0.45%) ethnic Germans, 8 (0.17%) ethnic Belarusians, 7 (0.14%) ethnic Jews, 0 to 16 (0.17%) Armenians, 0 to 12 (0.12%) Poles, 0 to 5 (0.04%) Gypsies, and 13 to 44 (0.60%) others and non-declared.

In June 1992, during the War of Transnistria the village was the scene of alleged human rights abuses by Moldovans. According to a report of the Russian human rights organisation, "Memorial", members of the local armed Transnistrian paramilitary unit were killed in this village during a gun-battle with Moldovan forces. The Moldovan troops were said to have been finishing off the wounded. At least three villagers were killed by stray bullets and fragments of shells. Two more villagers were beaten by Moldovan volunteers, mopping up the village. On several occasions unprovoked fire was opened at the houses of villagers (there were no victims).
