= 1966 Rose-Mar College of Beauty shooting =

Mass shooting in Arizona, U.S.

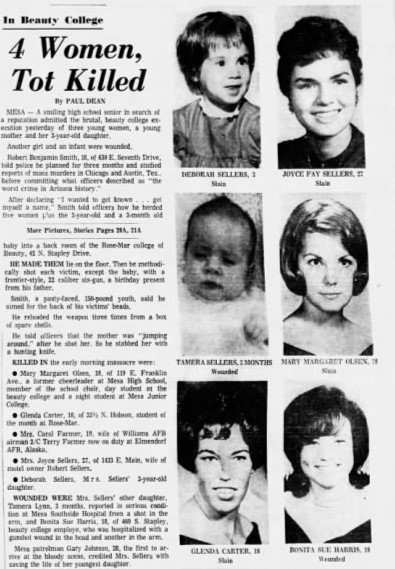
- Newspaper clipping from the The Arizona Republic
- Location: 33.4162°N 111.8057°W; Rose-Mar College of Beauty; Mesa, Arizona, U.S.
- Date: November 12, 1966; 60 years ago
- Attack type: Mass shooting; school shooting; mass murder; stabbing
- Weapons: .22 caliber “Frontier model” single-action long-barreled six-shooter revolver; Two hunting knives (one used)
- Deaths: 5
- Injuries: 2
- Perpetrator: Robert Benjamin Smith
- Motive: Achieving infamy

On November 12, 1966, 18-year-old Robert Benjamin Smith shot and killed five people—four women and a toddler—and injured two others at the Rose-Mar College of Beauty in Mesa, Arizona, United States. All seven victims had been shot and one of the victims who initially survived her wounds was stabbed in the back.

It is the deadliest school shooting in Arizona history. The shooting is considered to be the first copycat mass shooting with Smith indicating that he had wanted to kill more than Charles Whitman, the perpetrator of the University of Texas tower shooting earlier the same year.

== Background ==
The Rose-Mar College of Beauty was owned by Bert Freestone, a Mesa city councilor who also owned other beauty colleges throughout Mesa and neighboring Tempe. Students at the school took a nine-month and 1,800 hour course in order to become licensed cosmetologists. The first 300 hours were spent in a classroom, followed by working with customers alongside continued classroom study.

Freestone said that the victims had arrived early to the school and that if the attack had happened an hour later there would have been approximately 45 students at the school and more than 50 customers.

== Attack ==
The school's director, Earl Cummings, had arrived at the school shortly before the attack and found the students and a customer, who was with her two children, waiting outside, about half an hour before opening. Cummings unlocked the door and let them in before going to her office to take a phone call. When Cummings began to return from the office, she spotted Robert Smith standing outside the school with a handgun. Cummings initially returned to her office to call the police from there, but fearing that Smith might hear her, she went across the parking lot to a neighboring auto supply store where she called the police instead.

Smith entered the Rose-Mar College of Beauty and brandished his 22. caliber revolver, which his parents had given him for target practice, to gain the attention of the people inside. When no one paid attention, he fired a warning shot and ordered everyone, five students and one customer, along with the customer's baby and toddler, to head to the back room of the building. Once there, Smith made the victims lie down in a circle with their heads in the center and attempted to put sandwich bags over their heads in an attempt to suffocate them but was unable to fit the bags over their heads.

After one of the victims, Mary Margaret Olsen, began praying, Smith reacted angrily and demanded to know what Olsen was doing. When another victim, Carol Farmer, told Smith that Olsen was praying and reportedly asked him, "Do you mind?", Smith responded that he did and opened fire. Smith shot and killed three of his victims with shots to the head; the customer's toddler daughter initially survived her wounds and began "jumping around" before being stabbed to death by Smith. The customer, Joyce Sellers, managed to shield the body of her youngest child and the child survived with a gunshot wound in the arm. The fifth woman, Bonita Harris, survived by playing dead after she was shot. Harris recounted to the police that Smith had laughed as he shot his victims.

One of the responding officers, after taking Smith into custody without incident, said that he could hear a baby crying in the room where Smith had shot the victims.

== Victims ==
Three of the slain victims were students of the school while the remaining two deceased victims were a customer and one of her children. The two surviving victims were a student who pretended to be dead after she was shot, and that customer's 3-month-old child who was saved by her mother shielding her with her body.

The five deceased victims were identified as: students Mary Margaret Olsen and Glenda Sue Carter, both aged 18; Carol Pope Farmer, aged 19; customer Joyce Faye Luth Sellers, aged 27, and her 3-year-old daughter Debra LaRae Sellers.

== Perpetrator ==
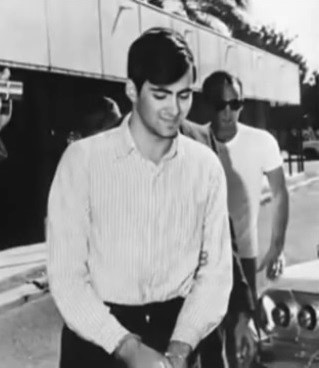
Smith being escorted from his arraignment the day after the attack

The gunman, 18-year-old Robert Benjamin Smith (February 10, 1948 – April 21, 2024), was born in Houston, Missouri, and was a resident of Mesa, and he surrendered without incident to responding police. The two first responding officers to arrive on scene found Smith unarmed. After entering the school, Smith told the officers that he "shot some people back there" and told them that he had left the gun he had used in the attack in a sack on a chair. Smith was a high school senior at Mesa High School at the time of the attack.

Smith told police that he was inspired by mass murderers Charles Whitman and Richard Speck who had carried out mass murders earlier the same year and that he sought infamy and wanted to be known and remembered. Smith also said that he had hoped to kill ten times as many people as he had and told investigators that he had scoped out a high school and another beauty shop as a place to attack and that he had considered returning to Houston and committing a crime at a bank where he knew people. Smith said in a confession that he had come up with the idea of attacking Rose-Mar College of Beauty about three months before the attack and that he didn't expect there to be children present.

A psychiatrist who examined Smith after the shooting testified that Smith considered "himself a god, born to rule others". A doctor who examined Smith 11 times between March 1967 and Smith's trial testified that Smith had wanted to attack a local girl's dormitory and that Smith "displayed total indifference" about the murders. The doctor also said that Smith believed he was picked on in school for being "effeminate", that he was "devoid of feeling for his parents" and once planned to murder his father with a knife, and that Smith had homicidal ideations since he was 13-years-old and felt exhilarated during the attack. Another doctor who examined Smith testified that it was "difficult to realize one is talking to a human being" while examining Smith and corroborated the testimony by the first doctor, saying that Smith told him he had committed the murders "for kicks". It was later observed that Smith had become captivated with historical figures such as Napoleon Bonaparte, Julius Caesar, and later Adolf Hitler. After the assassination of John F. Kennedy in 1963, Smith also became awe-struck by Kennedy's assassin, Lee Harvey Oswald.

He was considered to have had mental health issues and worked labor jobs on and off while incarcerated. He had been up for parole several times but was denied each time. Within his first year of imprisonment, he was disciplined for committing a physical assault while locked up. Smith was transferred to Abrazo West Campus hospital in Goodyear where he died on April 21, 2024.

== See also ==
- Gun violence in the United States
- List of school shootings in the United States by death toll
- List of attacks related to post-secondary schools
- List of massacres in Arizona
- Mass murder
- Mass shootings in the United States
