= Mizhi County middle school stabbing =

2018 mass stabbing in Shaanxi province, China

- Location: Mizhi County, Yulin, Shaanxi, China
- Date: 27 April 2018; 8 years ago 6:10 p.m. (China Standard Time)
- Attack type: Mass stabbing, school stabbing, mass murder
- Weapon: Knives
- Deaths: 9
- Injuries: 12
- Perpetrator: Zhao Zewei

The Mizhi County middle school stabbing occurred at No. 3 Middle School in Mizhi County, Yulin, Shaanxi, China, on 27 April 2018. Nine people were killed and 12 others were injured when 28-year-old Zhao Zewei rushed into a crowd of students and began stabbing them.

It is the deadliest school stabbing in the history of China.

== Stabbing ==
On 27 April 2018, Zhao Zewei (Chinese: 赵泽伟; born 20 January 1990, in Zhaojiashan Village) arrived at No. 3 Middle School in Mizhi County carrying knives he had ordered online the previous month. He attended the school as a child and claimed to have been bullied there, and planned the attack as revenge.

Zhao waited an hour for students to be dismissed at 6:10 p.m. and rushed at them in an alleyway with three knives, killing nine and injuring twelve. He was eventually subdued by teachers, students, and security guards and handed over to the local police.

== Aftermath ==
Zhao at trial on 10 July 2018

After Zhao's arrest, he was deprived of political rights for life. The Yulin Intermediate People's Court determined that he committed the attacks to vent his frustrations about his past at the school and the circumstances of his life. Zhao was sentenced to death on 10 July and chose not to appeal, stating in his letter: "I am sorry to the families of the deceased and their children, they have endured the greatest pain in the world. It is difficult for me to forgive myself for the pain of so many victims."

Zhao was executed on 27 September 2018, by firing squad near a road in Mizhi County. Footage was released by Sina News of his execution.
