= Poe Elementary School bombing =

1959 Texas school bombing

Coordinates: 29°43′40″N 95°24′25″W

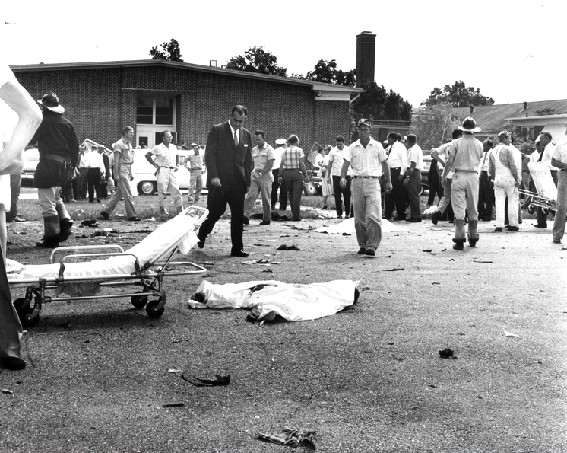
- The aftermath of the Poe Elementary School bombing
- Location: Houston, Texas, United States
- Date: September 15, 1959
- Target: Students and staff at Poe Elementary School
- Attack type: Suicide attack, school bombing
- Weapon: Suitcase bomb
- Deaths: 6 (including the perpetrator)
- Injuries: 18
- Perpetrator: Paul Harold Orgeron
- Motive: Denial of son's enrollment

The Poe Elementary School bombing was a suicide bombing at a school that occurred at Poe Elementary School in Boulevard Oaks, Houston, Texas, United States on September 15, 1959. Six people, including the perpetrator and his own son, were killed.

== Paul Orgeron and Dusty Paul ==
Paul Harold Orgeron, age 47, a tile-setter, ex-convict and devout Christian, had recently moved from Altus, Oklahoma to southern Houston, Texas with his seven-year-old son, Dusty Paul. According to Orgeron's ex-wife, Hazel, they divorced twice due to spousal abuse. Orgeron briefly rented at a nearby boarding house using the pseudonym Bob Silver. The landlord later said the father and son were quiet and had not caused any trouble.

Orgeron attempted to enroll his son in second grade at Edgar Allan Poe Elementary School but was denied since he lacked birth and health certificates for his son. He left the school office claiming he would return the next day with the documents.

== The bombing ==
Minutes after leaving the school office, around 10:00 am, Orgeron and his son approached a teacher, Patricia Johnston, on the school playground, who had been gathering her second graders for their return to the classroom. Orgeron, carrying a brown suitcase, gave her two pieces of paper to read. She was unable to understand them since the notes were illegible. Orgeron muttered about "having power in a suitcase," the will of God and having to "get to the children".

Orgeron asked that the children gather around him, and as he waved the suitcase around, Johnston became alarmed upon seeing a doorbell button on the bottom of the suitcase and instructed the students to return to the building. She also instructed two students to fetch the school principal, R. E. Doty, and the school custodian, James Montgomery, the only adult male in the school.

When the principal and the custodian arrived, Orgeron ignored Doty's instructions to leave the school grounds. Then Orgeron detonated the suitcase which contained perhaps six sticks of dynamite. The blast was so massive that witnesses thought they were under a Soviet nuclear attack.

The explosion claimed six lives, including both Orgeron and his son; two students; custodian Montgomery and a teacher, Jennie Kolter. Of the eighteen injured, principal Doty suffered a broken leg, and two children each lost a leg.

William Kolter, the son of Jennie Kolter, was chief resident at Hermann Hospital; he pronounced Jennie Kolter dead. There are plaques in the school to this effect.

== Fatalities ==
- Paul Harold Orgeron, 47 (the bomber)
- Dusty Paul Orgeron, 7
- Jennie Katharine Kolter, 54
- James Arlie Montgomery, 56
- William Sterrett Hawes Jr., 7
- John Cecil Fitch Jr., 8

The Texas National Guard was called out to protect other elementary schools in the blast's aftermath because the authorities were not certain whether the bomber had been killed in the blast.

== Police response ==
Police responded to find a 6-inch-deep (150 mm) hole in the asphalt "black top" play area. Victims' mangled bodies were burnt; some, including Doty, had their clothes ripped from them by the blast. One girl was blown over 100 feet away.

Police thought the bomber might have escaped and have other bombs, so the school was evacuated. After completing a bomb search, a roll-call by teachers showed that all students were present, except for those dead or injured.

Very little of Orgeron was found. Only small body parts were recovered from the surrounding bushes, buildings and homes. Orgeron's left hand was found in a hedge indicating he had died in the blast. It was used to identify him through fingerprints which were on file from prior convictions.

His nearby station wagon contained explosives and an August 25 receipt for detonators and 150 sticks of dynamite from Grants, New Mexico, where Orgeron had been between leaving Altus and arriving in Houston.

His prior convictions on safe-cracking perhaps explain his knowledge of dynamite.

== Contents of notes ==
Police managed to decipher Orgeron's notes:

=== First note ===
Please do not get excite over this order I'm giving you. In this suitcase you see in my hand is fill to the top with high explosive. I mean high high. Please believe me when I say I have 2 more [illegible writing] that are set to go off at two times. I do not believe I can kill and not kill what is around me, an I mean my son will go. Do as I say an no one will get hurt. Please. —P. H. Orgeron

=== Second note ===
Do not get the Police department yet, I'll tell you when. Please do not get excite over this order I'm giving you. In this suitcase you see in my hand it fill to the top with high explosive. Please do not make me push this button that all I have to do. And also have two 2 more cases [illegible writing] high explosive that are set to go off at a certain time at three different places so it will more harm to kill me, so do as I say and no one will get hurt. An I would like to talk about god while waiting for my wife.

Although previously not a religious man, Orgeron said he had recently "found God", according to family members who had attended Dusty's seventh birthday party at Dusty's grandmother's house the Saturday before the bombing.

The writing is unclear as Orgeron only attended school until the second grade.

== Aftermath ==
Unlike school attacks in the early 21st century, there was no constant national and international media coverage of the Poe attack. The school was open the next day, with approximately half of the students attending with increases each day even though cleanup and repairs were underway. HISD named two new elementary schools after victims of the attack: Kolter Elementary School in Meyerland and Montgomery Elementary School in Southwest Houston. Furthermore, a 5th grader of the school, Lawrence Eugene Schacht, was there that day. Sherrie Tatum, who had dated Schacht while they were in high school, stated that later mention that he felt, in the words of journalist John Lomax, "angered and betrayed by society for its seeming lack of compassion for the Poe victims, some of whom already suffered from generalized atomic bomb angst." Schacht would later administer over 900 doses of fatal cyanide-spiked flavor-aid in Guyana, during the infamous Jonestown Massacre. Citing other factors in Schacht's life and the fact that some other people who did not experience earlier trauma became addicted, Lomax stated: "Then again, to pin all those deaths on the bombing is a stretch."
