= Exception =

Exception(s), The Exception(s), or exceptional may refer to:

== Arts and entertainment ==
- The Exception, a 2016 British film
- The Exception (2006 novel), a Danish novel (orig. Undtagelsen, 2004) by Christian Jungersen
- The Exception (2019 film), a Danish film starring Amanda Collin, based on the 2006 novel
- Exception (TV series), a 2022 animated science fiction horror series.
- "Exception" (song), by Ana Johnsson* Exception (TV series), a 2022 anime series on Netflix
- Exception (video game), a 2019 game from Traxmaster Software
- Exceptional: Why the World Needs a Powerful America, a 2015 book by Dick and Liz Cheney
- The Exceptions, a German demo (computer art) group

== Other uses ==
- Exception handling, the process of responding to anomalous conditions during computation
  - Exception handling (programming), programming language mechanisms for dealing with abnormal circumstances
- Exceptional objects, in mathematics
  - Exceptional isomorphisms
- State of exception, a concept of extension of sovereign power

== See also ==
- Exceptionality (disambiguation)
- Exemption (disambiguation)
- Accept (disambiguation)
