= Receiving =

Receiving may refer to:

- Kabbalah, "receiving" in Hebrew
- Receiving department (or receiving dock), in a distribution center
- Receiving house, a theater
- Receiving line, in a wedding reception
- Receiving mark, postmark
- Receiving partner, in various sexual positions
- Receiving quarter, in military law
- Receiving ship, a ship used in harbor to house newly recruited sailors before they are assigned to a crew
- Receiving stolen goods, a crime in some jurisdictions

== See also ==
- Accept (disambiguation)
- Receive (disambiguation)
- Reception (disambiguation)
