= Department for Business and Trade v The Information Commissioner =

2025 UK Supreme Court case

Department for Business and Trade v. The Information Commissioner
- Court: Supreme Court of the United Kingdom
- Full case name: Department for Business and Trade (formerly the Department for International Trade) v Information Commissioner and another
- Argued: 18 June 2025
- Decided: 23 July 2025
- Neutral citation: [2025] UKSC 27, [2025] 1 W.L.R. 3456

Case history
- Prior history: [2023] EWCA Civ 844

Holding
- Public interest factors against disclosure under multiple FOIA exemptions may be aggregated when assessing the balance of interests.

Case opinions
- Majority: Lord Sales, Lord Burrows, Lord Lloyd-Jones
- Dissent: Lord Richards, Sir Declan Morgan

Keywords
- Freedom of information; Exemption; Disclosure

Department for Business and Trade v. The Information Commissioner [2025] UKSC 27 was a 2025 judgment of the Supreme Court of the United Kingdom concerning the interpretation of the Freedom of Information Act 2000. The ruling clarified how public interest factors should be weighed together when multiple qualified exemptions apply to a request for disclosure.

== Facts ==
In 2017, journalist Brendan Montague made a request for information from the Department for Business and Trade regarding trade working groups relating to post-Brexit negotiations. This was refused by the department when they issued a refusal notice under section 17 of the Freedom of Information Act 2000 which relied on section 27 and section 35 of the act. This was because, as the department argued, it would likely create prejudice on international relations (s.27) and information relating to government policy formulation (s.35).

On appeal to the first-tier tribunal, the tribunal had to consider how two qualified exemptions (section 27 and 35 in this case) would interact. They concluded that both exemptions together meant the information did not have to be disclosed as maintaining the exemptions outweighed the public interest of disclosure.

On appeal to the upper tribunal in 2022, the tribunal disagreed with the first-tier, holding that each exemption must be assessed separately and therefore could not be simply combined.

On appeal to the Court of Appeal in 2023, the court disagreed with the upper tribunal and agreed with the first-tier tribunal. They concluded that the public interest test, as per section 2(2)(b) of the Freedom of Information Act 2000, should be conducted together and therefore both exemptions in section 27 and 35 of the act should be looked at together. This allows for a practical method for the court to balance competing interests. Therefore, the appeal was dismissed.

== Judgement ==
By a majority 3-2, the Supreme Court agreed with the Court of Appeal, holding that when more than one qualified exemption applies, the public interest factors against disclosure may be considered cumulatively as it provides a more accurate approach to competing public interests. The court emphasised that Freedom of Information Act 2000 (FOIA) does not require separate balancing exercises for each exemption.

Lord Richards and Sir Declan Morgan dissented, warning that the cumulative approach risked diluting the transparency aims of FOIA by allowing departments to withhold information even where no individual exemption would justify non-disclosure on its own.

== See also ==
- Freedom of Information Act 2000
- Information Commissioner's Office
