= Exceptionality =

Exceptionality may refer to:

- Exceptionality effect, a psychological bias
- Exceptionalism, the perception or belief that someone or something is exceptional and, by implication, superior to similar people or things
- Special education, the practice of educating students in a way that accommodates their individual differences

== See also ==
- Exception (disambiguation)
