= The Rock (University of Michigan) =

Park in Ann Arbor, Michigan, United States

- George Washington Park
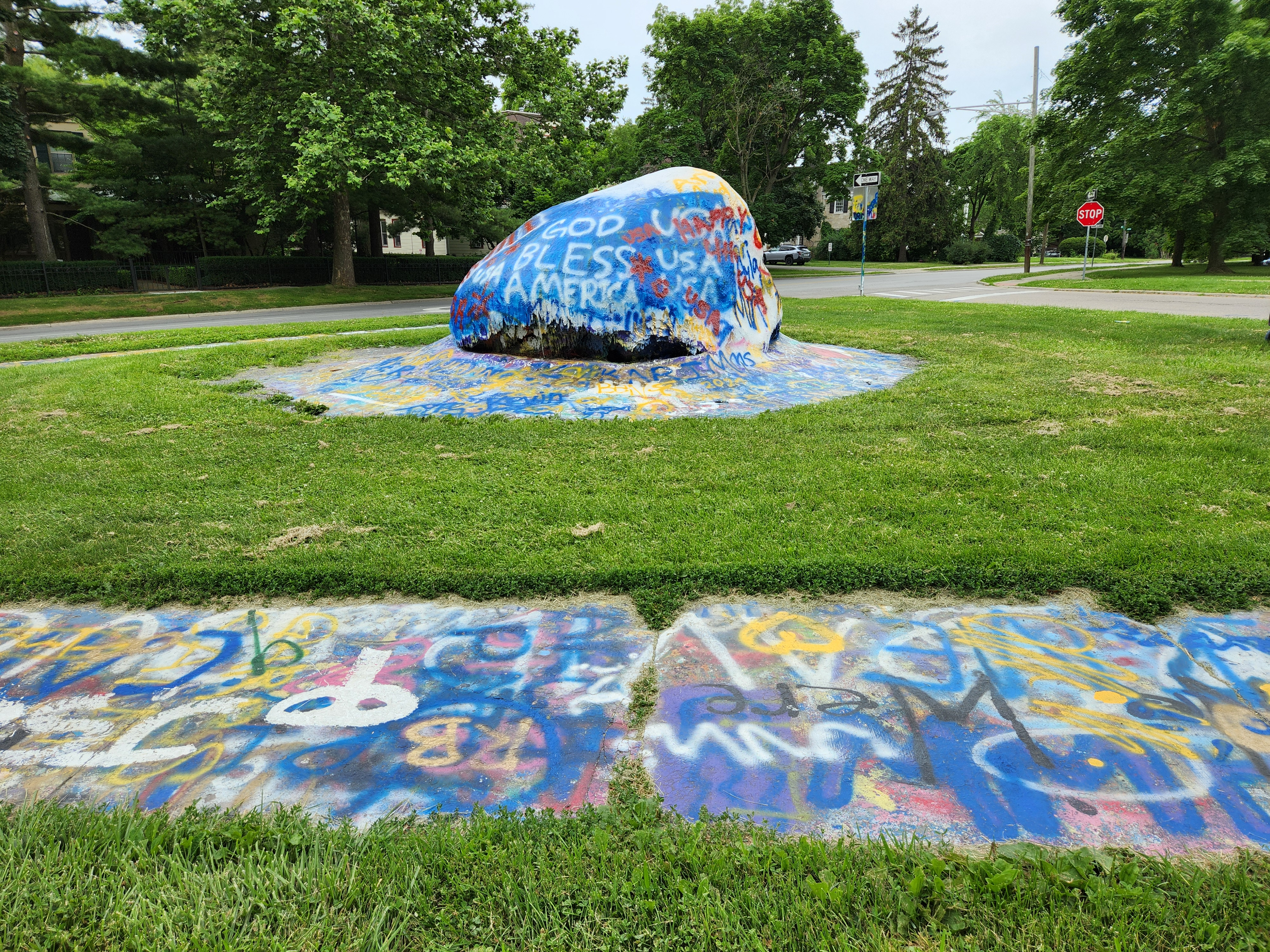
- The Rock in 2024, decorated for Independence Day
- Interactive map of The Rock
- Location: Hill St and Washtenaw Ave; Ann Arbor, Michigan
- Coordinates: 42°16′21.0″N 83°43′42.6″W
- Created: 1932
- Weight: 23 short tons (21 t)
- Website: www.a2gov.org/departments/Parks-Recreation/parks-places/pages/georgewashington.aspx

The Rock is a boulder in Ann Arbor, Michigan, near the campus of the University of Michigan. The Rock was installed in 1932 at the personal direction of Eli Gallup, longtime Ann Arbor parks superintendent and namesake of Gallup Park. The Rock was initially placed in honor of George Washington's 200th birthday, and the small triangular parcel holding the rock was officially named George Washington Park in 1993. The Rock was first painted in the 1950s, and continues to be repainted regularly by students and the general public.

== History ==
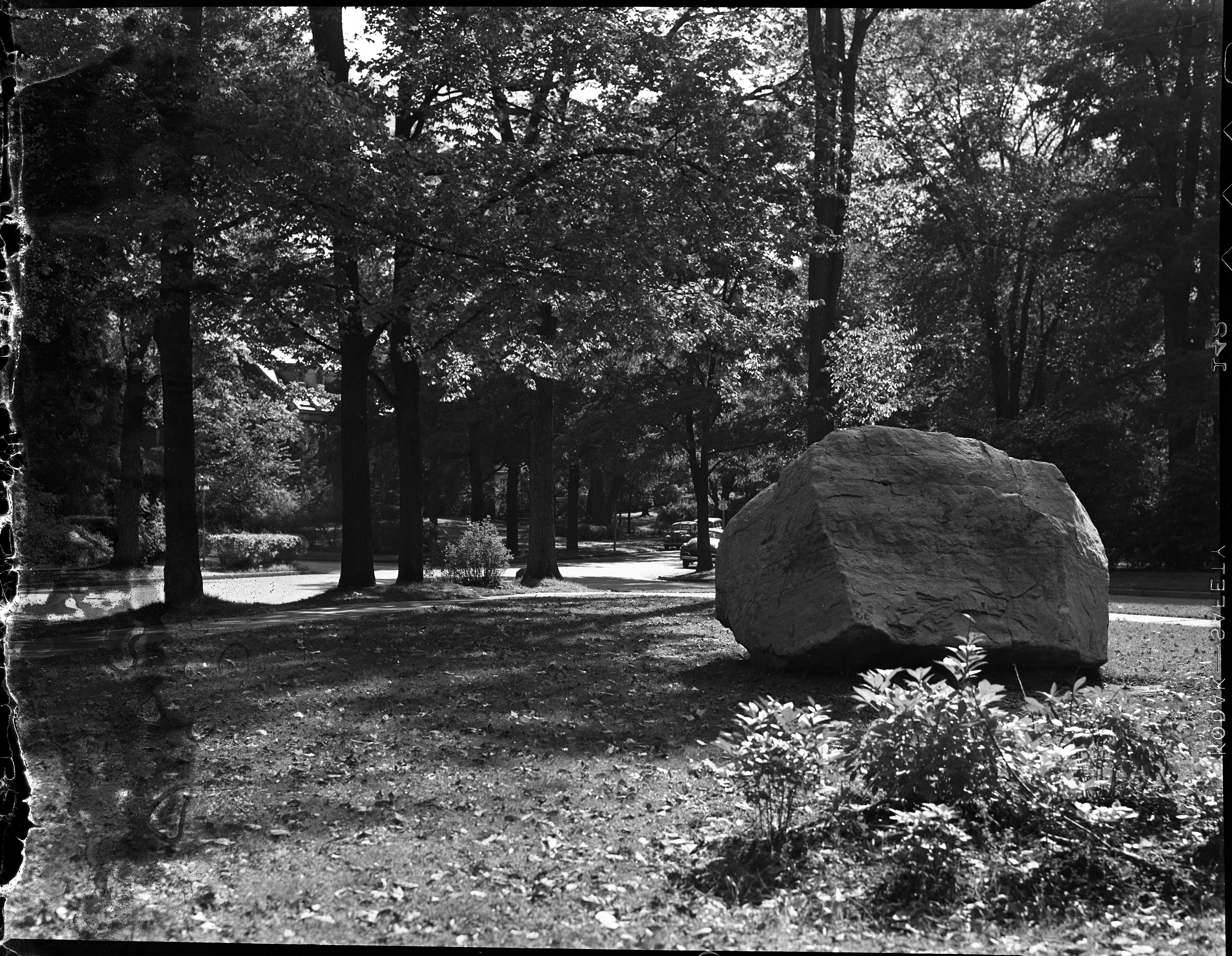
The Rock in 1938, decades before its first coat of paint

Eli A. Gallup (1891–1964) served as Ann Arbor parks superintendent from 1919 to 1961, in a period of rapid growth in the city. Gallup was fond of large rocks, and he personally directed the installation of multiple particularly attractive boulders in city parks. Gallup found one such boulder, a 23-short-ton (21-metric-ton) glacial erratic, in the city gravel pit on Pontiac Trail. The limestone rock bore deep scratches from the movement of the glaciers that deposited it, and Gallup thought that it was suitable for installation in a city park.

A triangular plot of land at Washtenaw Avenue and Hill Street was donated to the City of Ann Arbor in 1911 by dentist Louis Hall. Hall wanted to ensure that the land remained undeveloped, and feared that a gas station would be constructed on the land if he sold it. The plot of land sat at an attractive location, close to the campus of the University of Michigan and at the intersection of two of the city's main thoroughfares.

The Rock was transported to the site in February 1932. Gallup convinced Detroit Edison to loan a truck for the purpose, and the local Daughters of the American Revolution chapter provided support for other expenses. The rock was christened in memory of George Washington, on the occasion of the 200th anniversary of his birth. Eli Gallup's son Al, who witnessed the installation of the rock at the age of seven, believed that his father cared far more about the rock itself than the symbolism of George Washington.

A copper plaque was installed on the Rock in 1939. Gallup personally scavenged the material for the plaque from city landfills due to ongoing material shortages. The plaque was cast by industrial arts students at Ann Arbor's University High School, including Gallup's son Bill.

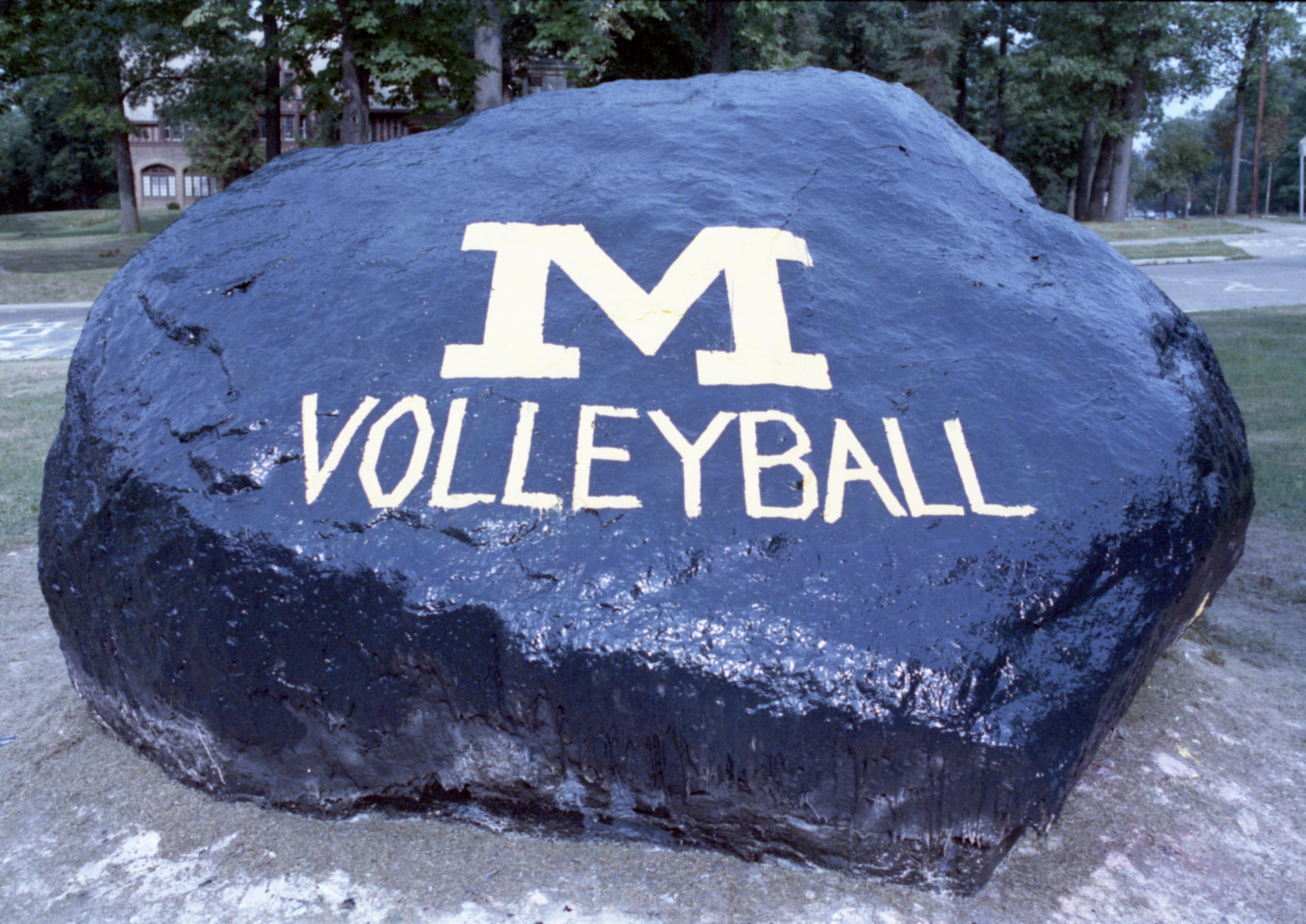
In 1985, painted for the Wolverines women's volleyball team

The Rock was first painted in the mid-1950s, when a group of visiting Michigan State students painted their school's initials and colors on the day of the rivalry football game. Michigan students quickly countered by repainting the rock with profanities and the names of fraternities. The parks department initially attempted to remove the paint, but it soon gave up.

In 1982, Michigan State student Brian Durrance chipped the paint off the Rock, confirming that the copper plaque commemorating George Washington was still in place. Clearing the Rock of paint took two days, and additional coats were applied shortly afterwards. The Rock has been continually repainted since, with the paint reaching a thickness of up to 5 in (13 cm) in 2010.

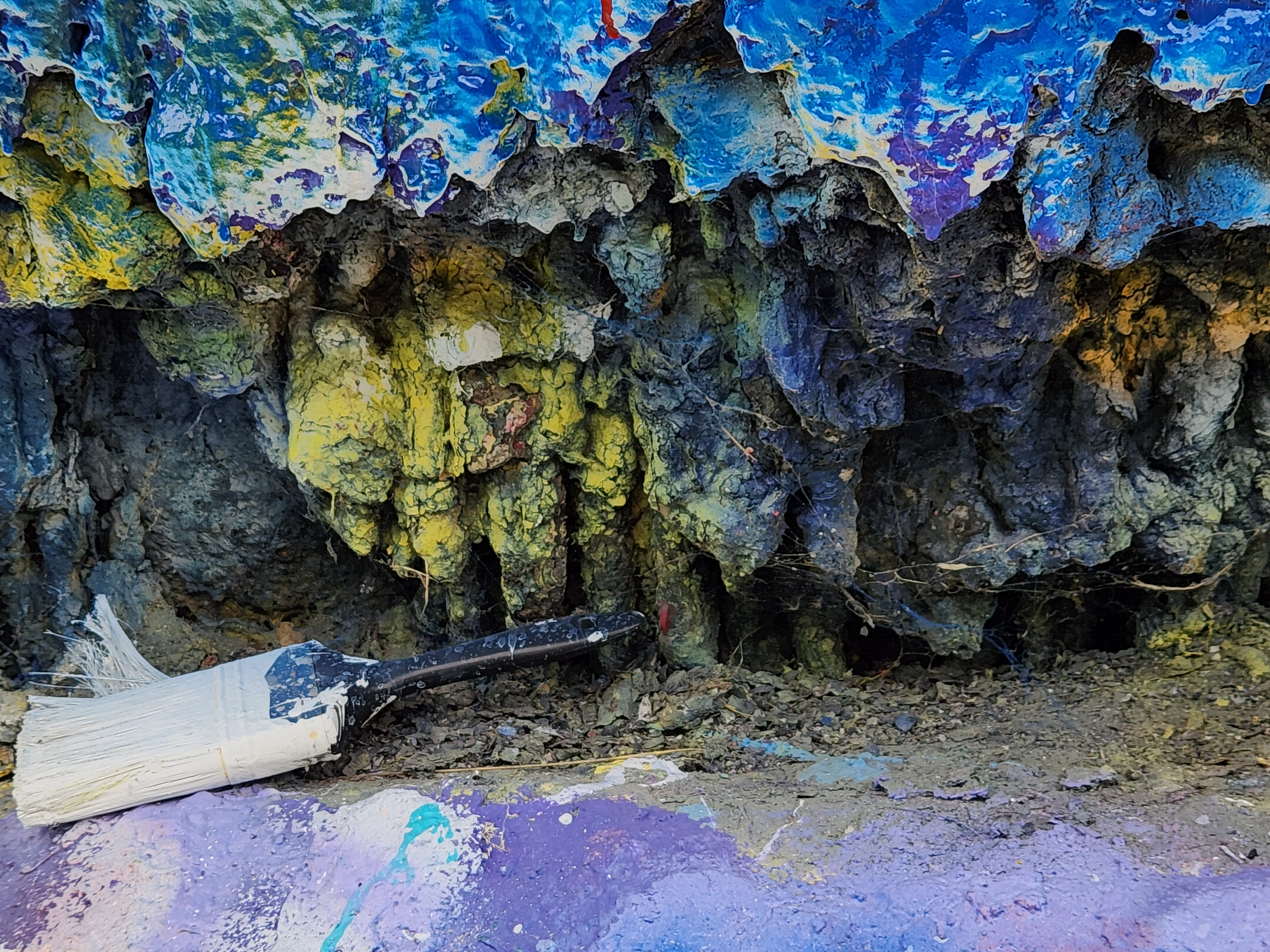
Paint accumulation on The Rock in 2024

Nearby residents have criticized the painting since the practice began. In 1993, the city considered removing the Rock after a large number of complaints, but ultimately decided to keep the Rock in place. In an attempt to clean up the Rock's reputation, the then-unnamed parcel of land was officially designated as George Washington Park. A sign was installed with rules for painters, and the city entered into an "adopt-a-park" agreement with nearby fraternities and sororities. The sign was quickly covered in paint, and the city gave up on removing paint from the Rock in the late 1990s.

During the 1993 investigations, the city commissioned a study of the soil around the Rock. The study concluded that the soil was not heavily contaminated, contradicting earlier assumptions. A 2010 investigation by The Michigan Daily found that the city had previously attempted to keep the sidewalks near the Rock clear of paint, at a cost of over $2,500 per year, but stopped after finding it futile.

== Notable messages ==
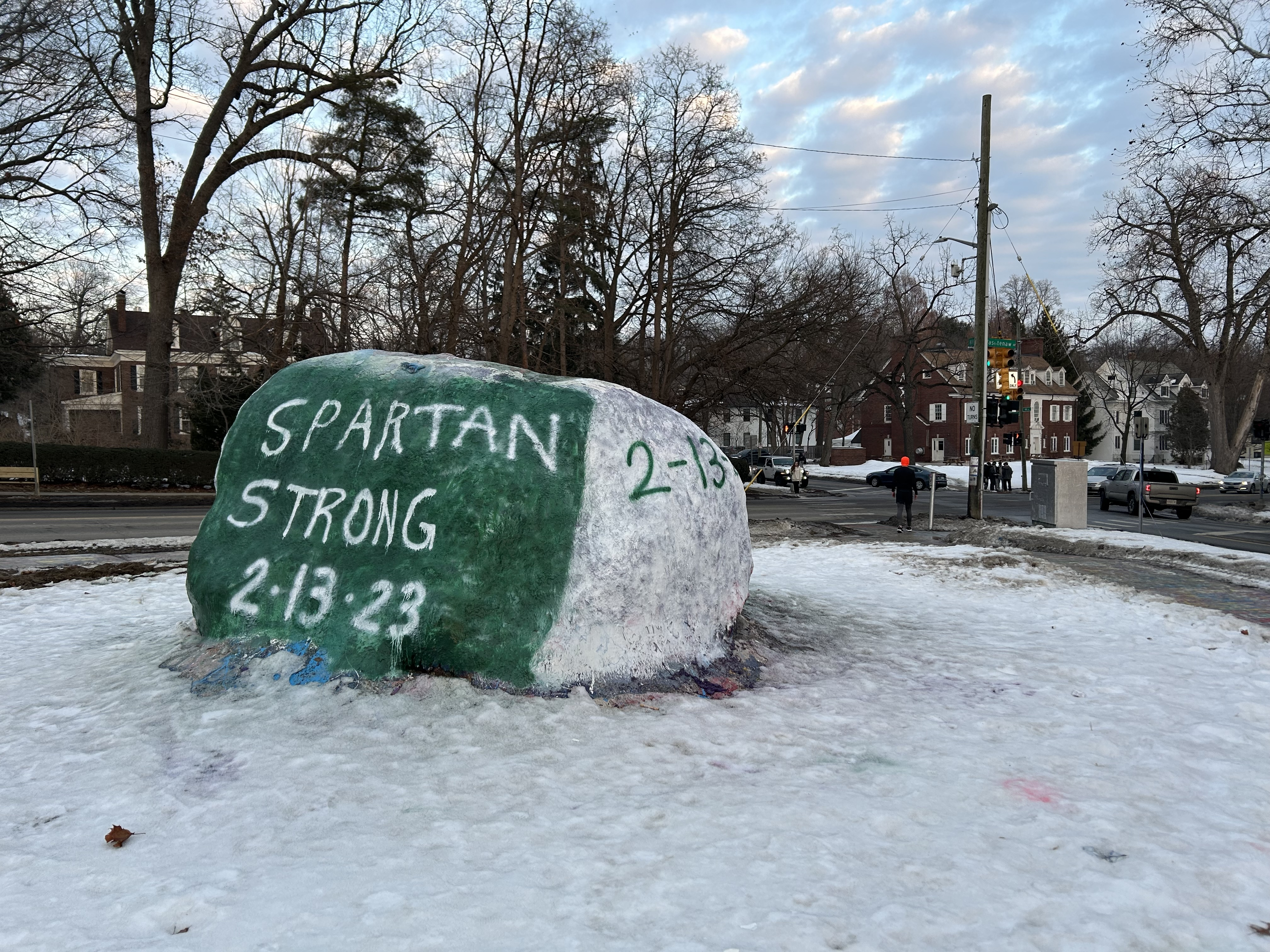
"Spartan Strong" message in 2026 the 2023 Michigan State University shooting

A weeks-long dispute arose over the Rock in May and June 2021, with messages addressing opposing sides of the Arab–Israeli conflict being rapidly painted over. A Pride flag design on the Rock was painted over with a message reading "Fuck Israel," which drew condemnation from multiple figures, including the university administration.

The Rock was painted with the slogan "Spartan Strong" after the 2023 Michigan State University shooting. The paint on the UM rock was part of a broader campuswide expression of solidarity with MSU, and mirrored a message on MSU's Rock. The paint on the UM Rock remained for multiple days, and the memorial on the MSU Rock stayed in place for months.

The Rock was set on fire on the evening of January 8, 2024, after the Wolverines football victory over Washington in the 2024 College Football Playoff National Championship. The fire at the Rock was one of 21 fires set in celebration of the victory, which also included multiple couches and mattresses. No structures were damaged, and no injuries were reported.

== See also ==
- The Rock (Michigan State University)
