= Proper =

Proper may refer to:

== Mathematics ==
- Proper map, in topology, a property of continuous function between topological spaces, if inverse images of compact subsets are compact
- Proper morphism, in algebraic geometry, an analogue of a proper map for algebraic varieties
- Proper transfer function, a transfer function in control theory in which the degree of the numerator does not exceed the degree of the denominator
- Proper equilibrium, in game theory, a refinement of the Nash equilibrium
- Proper subset
- Proper space
- Proper class
- Proper complex random variable

== Other uses ==
- Proper (liturgy), the part of a Christian liturgy that is specific to the date within the Liturgical Year
- Proper frame, such system of reference in which object is stationary (non moving), sometimes also called a co-moving frame
- Proper (heraldry), in heraldry, means depicted in natural colors
- Proper Records, a UK record label
- Proper (band), an American emo/pop-punk band
- Proper (album), an album by Into It. Over It. released in 2011
- Proper (often capitalized PROPER), a corrected release in response to a previously released online video or movie that contains transcoding or other playback errors

== See also ==
- Propriety
- Acceptable (disambiguation)
