= List of judgments of the Supreme Court of the United Kingdom delivered in 2025 =

This is a list of the judgments given by the Supreme Court of the United Kingdom in the year 2025. For the list for 2024, see List of judgments of the Supreme Court of the United Kingdom delivered in 2024.

In 2025, Lord Reed of Allermuir was the President of the Supreme Court; Lord Hodge was the Deputy President.

The table lists judgments made by the court and the opinions of the judges in each case. Judges are treated as having concurred in another's judgment when they either formally attach themselves to the judgment of another or speak only to acknowledge their concurrence with one or more judges. Any judgment which reaches a conclusion which differs from the majority on one or more major points of the appeal has been treated as dissent.

All dates are for 2025 unless expressly stated otherwise.

== 2025 case summaries ==
Unless otherwise noted, cases were heard by a panel of 5 judges.

Cases involving Scots law are highlighted in orange. Cases involving Northern Irish law are highlighted in green.

Case name	Citation	Date	Legal subject	Summary of decision
The Father v Worcestershire County Council	[2025] UKSC 1	29 January 2025	Family law, Habeas corpus	Applying for a writ of habeas corpus in respect of children who are subject to a care order is not the correct legal process because the children are not detained.
Royal Bank of Canada v Commissioners for His Majesty's Revenue and Customs	[2025] UKSC 2	12 February 2025	Corporation tax	The rights that BP paid for did not amount to the "right to work" under Article 6(2) of the UK/Canada double taxation Convention.
El-Khouri v Government of the United States of America	[2025] UKSC 3	12 February 2025	Extradition, Double criminality	The order for the extradition of El-Khouri was quashed. The correct test of double criminality in this case was from s.137(4)(b) of the Extradition Act 2003 because all the relevant conduct occurred outside the United States.
El-Husseiny v Invest Bank PSC	[2025] UKSC 4	19 February 2025	Insolvency	A "transaction" under section 423 of the Insolvency Act 1986 is not confined to a dealing with an asset owned by the debtor.
Nasir v Zavarco Plc	[2025] UKSC 5	19 February 2025	The doctrine of merger	The doctrine of merger is confined to judgments involving the payment of money or enforcing a right of property by ordering the return of the property (“coercive judgments”) and therefore does not apply to declaratory judgments.
N3 v Secretary of State for the Home Department	[2025] UKSC 6	26 February 2025	British nationality law	If an order that deprives a person of their British citizenship is withdrawn by the Home Secretary then it is treated as having no effect on an individual’s citizenship during the period it was in force.
Brown v Ridley	[2025] UKSC 7	26 February 2025	Adverse possession	Paragraph 5(4)(c) of Schedule 6 to the Land Registration Act 2002 allows any ten years of reasonable belief of ownership to be sufficient for adverse possession.
JR123 (Judicial Review App.)	[2025] UKSC 8	6 March 2025	Rehabilitation, Article 8 of the European Convention on Human Rights	The Rehabilitation of Offenders (Northern Ireland) Order 1978 strikes a fair balance and does not breach Article 8 of the European Convention on Human Rights.
The Royal Embassy of Saudi Arabia (Cultural Bureau) v Costantine	[2025] UKSC 9	6 March 2025	State immunity	The embassy was not entitled to state immunity because the conduct was not carried out in the exercise of sovereign authority.
Rukhadze v Recovery Partners GP Ltd	[2025] UKSC 10	19 March 2025	Fiduciaries, English tort law	The Court rejected the appellant's invitation to amend the test for liability to account for profits and reiterated that a fiduciary to bound to account for any profit made as a result of their position as a fiduciary.
R (on the application of The Spitalfields Historic Building Trust) v London Borough of Tower Hamlets	[2025] UKSC 11	26 March 2025	Planning law	The Supreme Court upheld the lawfulness of a local authority's standing order that restricted voting on deferred planning applications to councillors who had attended the original meeting.
R v Layden	[2025] UKSC 12	2 April 2025	Arraignment	Overruling R v Llewellyn, a failure to comply with the two-month arraignment requirement under section 8(1) of the Criminal Appeal Act 1968 does not deprive the Crown Court of jurisdiction to retry a defendant.
Glasgow City Council v X (Scotland)	[2025] UKSC 13	9 April 2025	Housing law	Interim accommodation provided under section 29(1) of the Housing (Scotland) Act 1987 need not meet all the special needs of household members to be considered suitable under article 4(b) of the Homeless Persons (Unsuitable Accommodation) (Scotland) Order 2014.
“MSC Flaminia”	[2025] UKSC 14	9 April 2025	Maritime law	Charterers may limit liability under the 1976 Convention on Limitation of Liability for Maritime Claims, even in respect of claims brought by shipowners, rejecting a narrower interpretation of Article 2.
Abbasi and another v Newcastle upon Tyne Hospitals NHS Foundation Trust; Haastrup v King’s College Hospital NHS Foundation Trust	[2025] UKSC 15	16 April 2025	Medical law	Injunctions protecting the anonymity of clinicians in end-of-life treatment cases must be grounded in a valid cause of action and cannot be maintained indefinitely without judicial review.
For Women Scotland Ltd v The Scottish Ministers	[2025] UKSC 16	16 April 2025	Human rights	The terms 'sex', 'man' and 'woman' in the Equality Act 2010 refer to biological sex.
R v Perry	[2025] UKSC 17	30 April 2025	Criminal law	The Supreme Court held that interpretation of a defence statement is a question of fact for the jury, not law for the judge, reaffirming the jury’s role in assessing meaning in non-jury trials.
Bilta (UK) Ltd v Tradition Financial Services Ltd	[2025] UKSC 18	7 May 2025	Insolvency law	Liability under s.213 of the Insolvency Act 1986 extends to outsiders who knowingly assist fraudulent trading, not just those in control of the company.
U3 v Secretary of State for the Home Department	[2025] UKSC 19	12 May 2025	Immigration law	SIAC’s public law review approach in national security cases was upheld; it need not determine disputed precedent facts unless fairness requires it.
Darwall v Dartmoor National Park Authority	[2025] UKSC 20	21 May 2025	Wild camping	Section 10(1) of the Dartmoor Commons Act 1985 confers a right to wild camp, interpreting “open-air recreation” to include overnight camping.
URS Corporation Ltd v BDW Trading Ltd	[2025] UKSC 21	21 May 2025	Construction law	BDW could recover remediation costs under negligence and the Defective Premises Act 1972; section 135 of the Building Safety Act 2022 applies retrospectively.
Waller-Edwards v One Savings Bank Plc	[2025] UKSC 22	4 June 2025	Equity and trusts	A bright-line test was adopted for when lenders are “put on inquiry” in hybrid transactions involving potential undue influence, refining the Etridge principles.
Andrysiewicz v Circuit Court in Lodz, Poland	[2025] UKSC 23	11 June 2025	Extradition law	Early release provisions in foreign jurisdictions carry limited weight in Article 8 ECHR proportionality assessments in extradition cases.
Commissioners for HMRC v Dolphin Drilling Ltd	[2025] UKSC 24	24 June 2025	Corporation tax	Accommodation use of a tender support vessel was not incidental to drilling operations, triggering the hire cap under section 356LA of the Corporation Tax Act 2010.
Iconix Luxembourg Holdings SARL v Dream Pairs Europe Inc	[2025] UKSC 25	24 June 2025	Trademark law	Post-sale confusion is relevant under section 10(2) of the Trade Marks Act 1994, but the trial judge’s finding of no infringement was restored due to low similarity.
Standish v Standish	[2025] UKSC 26	2 July 2025	Family law	Non-matrimonial property is not subject to the sharing principle unless clearly integrated into the marriage, refining the concept of “matrimonialisation”.
Department for Business and Trade v The Information Commissioner	[2025] UKSC 27	23 July 2025	Freedom of information	The Court endorsed the cumulative approach to qualified exemptions under FOIA, allowing public interest factors against disclosure to be aggregated.
Stevens v Hotel Portfolio II UK Ltd	[2025] UKSC 28	23 July 2025	Equity and trusts	A dishonest assistant is jointly liable for the loss of trust property even where the trust arose from unauthorised profit; the Court reinstated the trial judge’s award of £102.26m in equitable compensation.
R v Hayes; R v Palombo	[2025] UKSC 29	23 July 2025	Criminal law	The Court quashed both convictions, holding that the trial judges had wrongly removed key factual questions from the jury by treating trading-motivated submissions as legally dishonest per se.
Shvidler v Secretary of State for Foreign, Commonwealth and Development Affairs	[2025] UKSC 30	29 July 2025	Sanctions law	The Court upheld the designation of Mr Shvidler under the Russia (Sanctions) Regulations 2019, clarifying the proportionality test and affirming the wide margin of appreciation afforded to Ministers.
D.E.L.T.A. Merseyside Ltd v Uber Britannia Ltd	[2025] UKSC 31	29 July 2025	Transport law	The Court held that operators outside London are not required to contract as principals when accepting bookings under the Local Government (Miscellaneous Provisions) Act 1976.
Wathen-Fayed v Secretary of State for Levelling Up, Housing and Communities	[2025] UKSC 32	30 July 2025	Planning law	The Supreme Court held that the statutory distance restrictions in section 5 of the Cremation Act 1902 apply only to the crematory building itself, not to memorial gardens or ancillary areas.
Hopcraft v Close Brothers Ltd	[2025] UKSC 33	1 August 2025	Consumer credit law	The Court rejected claims based on fiduciary duty and bribery in motor finance commission arrangements, but upheld Mr Johnson’s claim under section 140A of the Consumer Credit Act 1974 due to an unfair relationship. The judgment clarified the limits of equitable doctrines in regulated credit agreements and affirmed the statutory test for unfairness.
The Prudential Assurance Company Ltd v Commissioners for His Majesty’s Revenue and Customs	[2025] UKSC 34	11 September 2025	Tax law	The Court clarified VAT and related tax issues in supplies between corporate group members, refining the circumstances in which such supplies are taxable.
CG Fry & Son Ltd v Secretary of State for Housing, Communities and Local Government	[2025] UKSC 35	22 October 2025	Environment and planning	
Process & Industrial Developments Ltd v The Federal Republic of Nigeria	[2025] UKSC 36	22 October 2025	Court procedure	The Commercial Court was right to hold that, as Nigeria had incurred its liability to its solicitors in sterling, and had been invoiced and had paid them in sterling, a costs order made by the court should be in sterling.
Northumbria Healthcare NHS Foundation Trust v Commissioners for His Majesty's Revenue and Customs	[2025] UKSC 37	29 October 2025	Tax law	
Daly v His Majesty's Advocate; Keir v His Majesty's Advocate	[2025] UKSC 38	12 November 2025	Criminal law; Human rights	The Scottish Courts should change their approach to the admissibility of evidence in sexual offence trials, as it is liable to breach the rights of defendants (under article 6 of the European Convention on Human Rights) to a fair trial. However, on the facts, the defendants had a fair trial.
King Crude Carriers SA v Ridgebury November LLC	[2025] UKSC 39	12 November 2025	Commercial contract law	There is no principle of English law that a condition precedent of a debt should be treated as having been satisfied if the party that would owe the debt has wrongfully prevented the condition from being satisfied. The contract could not be read in such a way that the claimed debt was owed, and no suitable term to that effect could be implied into the contract.
Application by JR87 and another for Judicial Review (Appellant)	[2025] UKSC 40	19 November 2025	Human rights	JR87’s school religious education and collective worship were not conveyed in an objective, critical, and pluralistic manner and so their provision was contrary to Article 2 of Protocol 1 ("A2P1") of the European Convention on Human Rights (“ECHR”), read with Article 9 ECHR, as incorporated into domestic law by the Human Rights Act 1998.
Simkova v Secretary of State for Work and Pensions	[2025] UKSC 41	19 November 2025	EU law; social security law	
R (Jwanczuk) v Secretary of State for Work and Pensions	[2025] UKSC 42	20 November 2025	Social security law; human rights	
Mitchell v Sheikh Mohamed Bin Issa Al Jaber	[2025] UKSC 43	24 November 2025	Insolvency law; equity	
X (Appellant) v The Lord Advocate	[2025] UKSC 44	10 December 2025	Tort law	
Veale v Scottish Power UK Plc	[2025] UKSC 45	10 December 2025	Tort law	
Commissioners for His Majesty's Revenue and Customs v Hotel La Tour Ltd	[2025] UKSC 46	17 December 2025	Tax law	
Secretary of State for the Home Department v Kolicaj	[2025] UKSC 47	18 December 2025	Public law; immigration	
Evans v Barclays Bank Plc	[2025] UKSC 48	18 December 2025	Court procedure; competition	
