= Rejection =

Rejection, or the verb reject, may refer to:

- Social rejection, in psychology, an interpersonal situation that occurs when a person or group of people exclude an individual from a social relationship
- Transplant rejection, in medicine, the immune reaction of a host organism to a foreign biological tissue, such as in a transplantation
- In telecommunications, rejection is the receiving of the desired signal without interference from another undesired one.
- In basketball, rejection is a slang term for a block
- In mathematics, the rejection of a vector a from a vector b is the component of a perpendicular to b, as opposed to its projection, which is parallel to b.
- In statistics, rejection of a null hypothesis in favour of an alternative hypothesis when doing a hypothesis test.
- In statistics, rejection sampling is a technique used to generate observations from a distribution
- In zoology, the shunning of one or more animals in a litter
- Rejection of Jesus, described in the New Testament

== Art, media and entertainment ==
- "Reject", a song by Green Day from Nimrod
- "Reject", a song by Living Sacrifice from Reborn, 1997
- "Reject", a song by Moby from Animal Rights, 1996
- "Rejection", a song by AC/DC from Power Up
- "Rejection" (song), a song by Martin Solveig
- The Rejection, an EP by Dangerous Muse
- Rejection (film), a 2011 Ukrainian film
- Rejection, a 2009 film with Gary Farmer
- Rejection (short story collection), a book by Tony Tulathimutte
- Reject (esports), a Japanese esports organization

== See also ==
- Accept (disambiguation), the opposite of rejection
- Aversion (disambiguation)
- Rejectionism (disambiguation)
- Repulsion (disambiguation)
