= Private Citizens =

2016 debut novel by Tony Tulathimutte

- Author: Tony Tulathimutte
- Publisher: William Morrow and Company
- Publication date: February 9, 2016
- Pages: 384
- ISBN: 978-0062399106

Private Citizens is a 2016 debut novel by Tony Tulathimutte, published by William Morrow and Company. It follows four graduates from Stanford University—Cory, Henrik, Linda, and Will—as they struggle toward their personal fulfillment and professional goals in the San Francisco Bay Area in the 2000s. Critics have considered the book to be a Great American Novel or one of the first great millennial novels. In 2017, Tulathimutte won a Whiting Award in fiction for the book.

== Synopsis ==
Set in San Francisco right before the Great Recession, the novel follows four characters freshly graduated out of Stanford University as they proceed and struggle along their respective career and life paths. Cory takes up leadership at a progressive nonprofit organization and sometimes struggles with liberal guilt; Linda is a writer who has a run-in with drugs and a car crash; Henrik is Linda's ex and a scientist whose graduate studies are turbulent due to chronic underfunding in academia; and Will is a software engineer who amasses lots of money and capital but faces difficulty with regard to his Asian American identity and eventually loses himself in the gravity of his girlfriend, a startup founder named Vanya.

== Background ==
=== Stanford and Silicon Valley ===
Tulathimutte attended Stanford University, where he started writing in his freshman year. There, he had written pandering pieces about white people while not yet having any interest in writing about Asian Americans; some of them were successful, ultimately winning Tulathimutte some of his first awards, including an O. Henry Award, which was an outcome which he called "enormously destructive ... it ended up reinforcing the feeling that if I gave people what they wanted, then I'd get acknowledge as a worthwhile individual".

After graduating, Tulathimutte worked in Silicon Valley as a UX researcher for a few years. Not satisfied with his career choice, he ended up attending the Iowa Writers' Workshop and moved to New York City. Through his twenties, Tulathimutte had felt "a crude, formless angst over not having accomplished anything I was particularly proud of, nothing that I thought represented me in any way", after which the abandoned the ethos "that really good fiction required writing about people and experiences as different from yours as possible" and endeavored to write about his years at Stanford and in San Francisco.

=== Writing the novel ===
Before starting on Private Citizens, Tulathimutte had written a short story collection that he didn't want to publish as well as a novel that ended up amounting to a novella. Two years passed, during which he didn't write any new material. One day, however, Tulathimutte wrote a 40-page short story "about people day-tripping to the beach, similar to a trip I’d taken a couple of years earlier. I’d remembered thinking very vividly on that trip, why do I feel so anxious, why is it so hard to enjoy this?" The short story originally concerned Tulathimutte's original articulation of the character Linda, after which he believed it needed to bring cognitive depth to the other characters at the beach too in order for something to click. He later workshopped it during his attendance of the Iowa Writers' Workshop in 2008, a time when "Every attempt at writing about people my age up to that point had always struck me as frivolous and self-indulgent". With encouragement from a friend, Karan Mahajan, Tulathimutte decided, "okay, I’m just gonna sketch these four different characters and give them each a scenario. This wound up as the prologue of the novel, in a condensed form."

Originally, the book was titled Being Right. In the Rumpus, Tulathimutte said that the whole book "wasn't plotted at all" and "was written in the stupidest way possible, which was all at once ... I had ideas for thoughts, characters, individual sentences, and I wrote them down in a gigantic nebula of Word files." At most, he amassed "1,100 pages" of unorganized, unrevised material that he eventually pared down and tightened to slightly less than 400 pages. Amid critics comparing Tulathimutte to various authors including Jonathan Franzen, Tulathimutte himself called the book a "post-grad anomie" novel in the same literary lineage as books by Keith Gessen and Mary McCarthy.

Regarding the character of Will, Tulathimutte said he originally wanted him to be a tech bro who was white, with race serving as a "buffer" between Will's characterization and Tulathimutte's own reality as someone who formerly worked in Silicon Valley. However, Tulathimutte eventually realized he "had to cave and say, no, everything that gives context to his specific kind of resentment and indignation is that he’s an Asian guy. And that was the hardest thing." While Tulathimutte stated that he identifies with all four protagonists rather than just Will, he admitted that Will's biographical similarity to himself was a trick on critics.

"The difference with Will is that I didn't try to demurely abstract the character Will from myself, but to deliberately bait comparisons with him ... Since I knew I’d be identified with my Asian character anyway, I rigged it so that doing so would force critics to make blatantly racist surmises, to expose what we're dealing with. That is, if they’re going to try to essentialize my character’s Asianness, they’ll have to go through me."

=== Genre ===
In Electric Literature, Tulathimutte pushed back against claims that he was writing a novel for the millennial generation or a Great American Novel, stating "That's just vanity. That's just you wanting to own everybody." He further stated that Linda's critique of male writers was intended "to expose my limitations." Ultimately, Tulathimutte said he was writing about "privileged mostly white people in San Francisco" due to his experiences growing up in a white town, going to a white school, attending a well-off institution like Stanford, and arriving in the San Francisco Bay Area "with these Mongol hordes of tech and finance people who followed the money." Tulathimutte also rebutted against claims of the novel being a satire given his personal proximity to the experiences of his protagonists as well as the realism of millennial experience captured.

== Critical reception ==
Upon awarding Tulathimutte with a Whiting Award in 2017 for the novel, the selection committee cited: "He tackles the 21st century social novel armed with tremendous verve, an unsparing eye, and formidable skill ... What might merely be an achingly hilarious skewering builds to a vision of devastation, though his pessimism is tempered by understanding. It is a dazzling debut."

Publishers Weekly observed the novel's articulation of millennial experiences, specifically lauding Tulathimutte's execution of the first half of the novel where "each of its lengthy chapters focuses on one of the four characters and reads almost like a well-developed short story", whereas the convergence of said characters in the second half feels "less satsifying." Ultimately, the reviewer concluded that Tulathimutte bore "a talent for satire, and a willingness to embrace brutal reality and outright absurdity." In a starred review, Kirkus Reviews similarly observed the respective trajectories of the four characters and how each of them suffered a uniquely different, yet broadly relevant, challenge pertaining to the 2000s: failed nonprofits, tortured artists, underfunded scientists, and Asian Americans facing crises of identity. The reviewer concluded that "Witty, unsparing, and unsettlingly precise, Tulathimutte empathizes with his subjects even as he (brilliantly) skewers them."

In Hyphen, Mia Ayumi Malhotra similarly observed the strength of the first half, likening them to "a set of novellas" about each of the four characters. Malhotra then said that Tulathimutte's choice of "social milieu" among his protagonists provided fertile ground for satire but "At times, the novel becomes relentlessly discursive, which, after several pages, can feel suffocating, the characters’ torrent of language—theorizing, self-narrating, postulating—trapping them, and, consequently, us, in their fraught millennial minds." Ultimately, Malhotra's conclusion of the book was less that it was a "portrait of today's generation" but rather an insightful, intimate glimpse into the secrets of Tulathimutte's protagonists.

Manuel Gonzales, writing for the New York Times, applauded Tulathimutte's ability to write humor on the page, especially in "dire, awkward, uncomfortable situations" where the execution of humor relied upon Tulathimutte's prose rather than any inherent humor within a moment. Gonzales also appreciated how Tulathimutte made his characters not merely laughingstocks but full, complex human beings whom readers could simultaneously laugh at and feel for. However, Gonzales did note some insistences where Tulathimutte's humor may have been overbearing and sometimes "far-fetched". Similarly, Sathnam Sanghera wrote in a brief recommendation for the New York Times that "Mr. Tulathimutte is keen to probe the underlying anxieties and insecurities of his characters, making them more empathetic and appealing than they might have been."

Brett Beach, in the Masters Review, called Tulathimutte's debut "superb" and likened its empathetic, incisive perspective to Americanah by Chimamanda Ngozi Adichie with a tone akin to Philip Roth and an ambition matching that of Jonathan Franzen. Like many critics, Beach commended Tulathimutte's character work, stating: "Here Tulathimutte proves himself an intelligent, energetic writer of observation; lists, diatribes, and descriptions gather on the page in a dense but spectacular evocation of San Francisco and the people who crowd its streets." In his conclusion, Beach argued that the novel was proof that literature could be both serious and entertaining.

Christian Lorentzen, writing for Vulture, also compared Tulathimutte's writing to Franzen's and closely observed the individual quirks of each of his four protagonists, stating that the novel wasn't confined to the narrow description of a "Silicon Valley novel" but rather explored interests much more broad and diverse than technological advancement (and its work culture). Calling it a Great American Novel for the millennial generation, Lorentzen concluded: "We know millennials as bogeychildren of alarmist trend pieces and the catchall hand-wringing of an aging commentariat. Tulathimutte is on the front line of writers showing that they’re also worthy heroes and heroines of the American novel." Meanwhile, Maddie Crum, in a review for the Huffington Post, was less convinced by the common comparison of Tulathimutte to Franzen, stating that while "Tulathimutte punctuates these long-winded critiques, sometimes stuffed uncomfortably into the mouths of his characters, with absurd humor and hilariously uncomfortable descriptions of sex ... Tulathimutte likes his characters, and it shows."

Some critics saw the book as primarily a satire of the millennial generation. The Herald, however, saw the book as less of a satire and more of a social novel; the reviewer commended Tulathimutte's comfort in his 2000s setting of choice and said "He uses Private Citizens like a particle accelerator, encouraging elements of contemporary culture to clash into one another and examining the effects of the fallout on his deeply flawed characters." The reviewer also stated that Tulathimutte's characters additionally achieved a sense of humanity, toward which readers could empathize, rather than merely serving as props or objects in his discursive experiment of modern culture.

For the Guardian, Sarah Ditum criticized Tulathimutte's characters for being "cramped and inert" with little tangibly happening or involving to them and hardly any substantive interaction between them; she argued it was more of a "time capsule rather than a novel" insofar as it effectively and poignantly captured the "details right" of the 2000s but only to the extent of "nostalgia" rather than that of "complex characters and a detailed social world".

For the New Yorker's article, "The Books We Loved in 2016", Karan Mahajan recommended the book alongside several others.
