= MSU Union =

Michigan State University student center

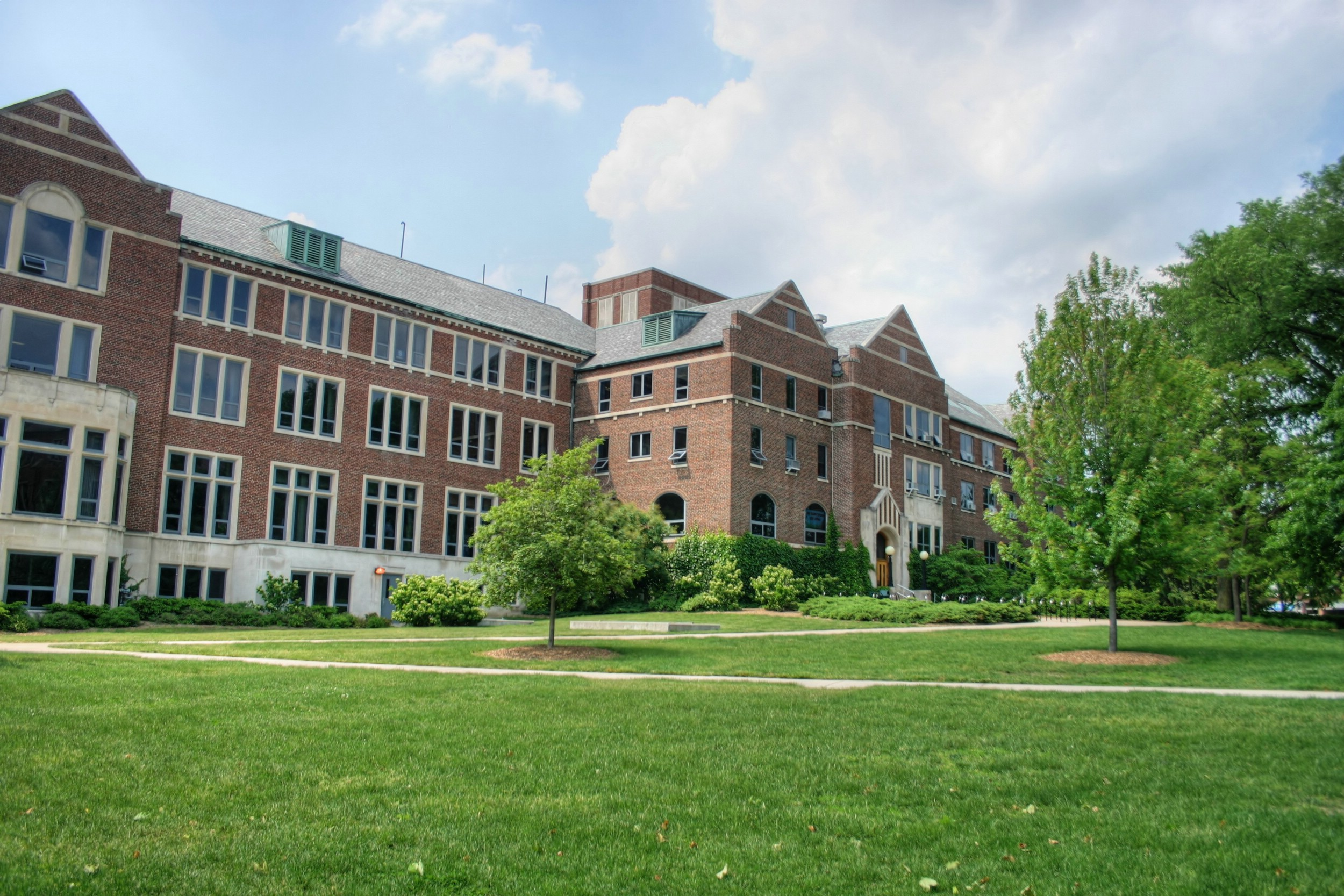
- MSU Union, designed by Pond and Pond, is home to many events on campus.
- Interactive map of the MSU Union area

General information
- Type: Student union
- Location: Michigan State University
- Coordinates: 42.734114°N 84.48289°W
- Completed: 1925

Design and construction
- Architect: Pond and Pond

Website
- Official website

MSU Union is a central gathering place for students of Michigan State University in East Lansing, Michigan, United States. Construction was started in 1923 and was completed in 1925. It includes a food court, convenience store, apparel shop, computer lab, arcade, MSUFCU, conference rooms, study lounges and classrooms.

In 2023, it was among the sites of a mass shooting on campus.
