= Tony Tulathimutte =

American fiction writer (born 1983)

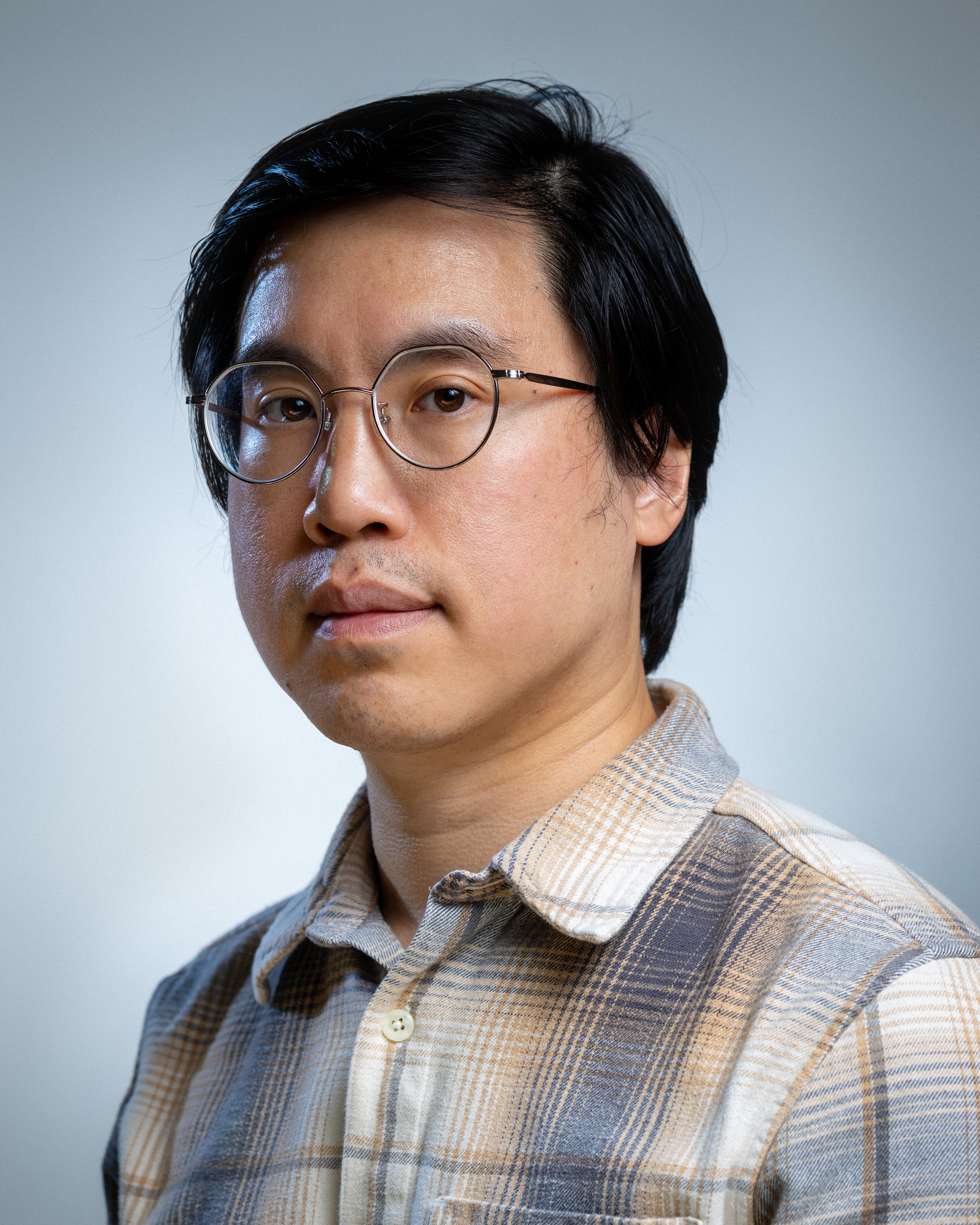
- Tulathimutte in June 2026
- Born: September 1, 1983 (age 43); Springfield, Massachusetts, U.S.
- Education: Stanford University (BS, MS); Iowa Writers' Workshop (MFA)
- Occupation: Writer
- Writing career
- Genres: Short story, novel
- Notable awards: O. Henry Award (2008); Whiting Award in Fiction (2017); Jack Galef Literary Arts Award (2026)
- Website: tonytula.com

Tony Tulathimutte (/tuːlʌtɪmuːtiː/; Thai: โทนี ตุลาธิมุตติ; born September 1, 1983) is an American writer known for his satirical fiction. His short story "Scenes from the Life of the Only Girl in Water Shield, Alaska" received an O. Henry Award in 2008. In 2016, he published his debut novel, Private Citizens. His 2024 short story collection Rejection was longlisted for the National Book Award for Fiction.

== Early life ==
Tulathimutte grew up in Massachusetts, the son of immigrants from Thailand. He is a graduate of the Iowa Writers' Workshop. He has bachelor's and master's degrees in symbolic systems from Stanford University and formerly worked as a writer and user experience researcher in San Francisco. Unhappy with his career, he decided to pursue his interest in writing, beginning work on Private Citizens.

== Career ==
Though it struggled to find a publisher, Private Citizens, which follows four Stanford alumni after their graduation, was eventually acquired by William Morrow and Company/HarperCollins, which paid Tulathimutte an advance of $20,000 and released it in 2016. It received positive reviews; it was called "the first great millennial novel" by New York magazine and Jonathan Franzen cited it as one of his favorite novels of the decade.

In 2019, Tulathimutte's short story "The Feminist" was published by the magazine n+1. It drew significant feedback and controversy, becoming the most-read story on the magazine's website. A satire written from the perspective of a man who is a self-described feminist ally, but whose lack of romantic success leads him to blame women for "fail[ing] feminism" and eventually turn to violence, it received criticism from some feminists and was embraced by some antifeminists. Tulathimutte stressed that he did not share the views of its narrator, but after its publication, said that "in practice everyone projected their own politics onto it."

In 2024, William Morrow/HarperCollins published Rejection, a short story collection that includes "The Feminist". Giles Harvey of The New York Times Magazine said it satirized "current liberal piety" and "corporatized identity politics."

In 2026, Tulathimutte was named as the inaugural recipient of the Jack Galef Literary Arts Award. The award is administered by the University of Iowa Writers’ Workshop, on behalf of the estate of Jack Galef, and comes with a prize of $150,000

As of 2024, Tulathimutte is the lead instructor at CRIT, a creative writing workshop based in Brooklyn, New York.

== Personal life ==
As of 2024, Tulathimutte resides in Crown Heights, Brooklyn. He is an avid gamer.

== Works ==
=== Novel ===
- Private Citizens. William Morrow and Company. 2016. ISBN 978-0062399106.

=== Short story collection ===
- Rejection. William Morrow and Company. 2024. ISBN 978-0063337879.

=== Short stories ===
- "Composite Body" in The Cimarron Review
- "Inheritance" in The Threepenny Review
- Brains in The Malahat Review
- "The Man Who Wasn't Male" in Wag's Revue
- "Scenes from the Life of the Only Girl in Water Shield, Alaska" in The Threepenny Review
- "The Feminist" in n+1
- "Ahegao" in The Paris Review

=== Nonfiction ===
- Remote Research (2010), co-author with Nate Bolt
- "The Rejection Plot" in The Paris Review

== Awards ==
- O. Henry Award (2008)
- Whiting Award in Fiction (2017)
- Jack Galef Literary Arts Award (2026)
- Spiegel Book Award (2026)
