= The Rock (Michigan State University) =

Feature of the Michigan State University campus

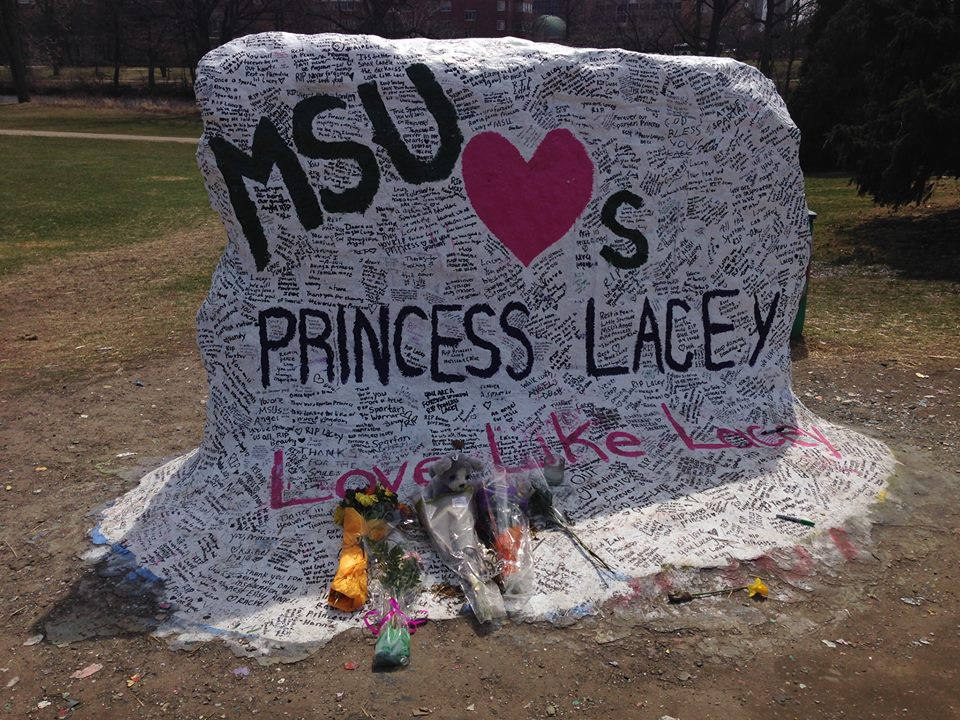
- The Rock in 2014, commemorating Lacey "Princess Lacey" Holsworth
- Interactive map of The Rock
- Type: Jasper conglomerate rock covered in household paint
- Location: Near the Farm Lane Bridge; East Lansing, Michigan
- Coordinates: 42°43′41″N 84°28′39″W
- Designated: May 30, 1873; 152 years ago
- Owner: Michigan State University
- Condition: Regularly repainted with messages

The Rock is a large pudding stone on the campus of Michigan State University, which has been painted with messages by campus groups since the 1960s. Unearthed in 1873, and installed on the campus by the class of 1873, the Rock became known as a site for engaged and married couples in the 1910s. Nicknamed the "Engagement Rock" in the 20th century, its purpose shifted in the 1960s and 1970s when graffiti began to appear on it for protest and promotional purposes.

The university's efforts to remove the paint in the late 1970s failed, and the painting of the Rock continued. The university recognized the tradition of painting the Rock in the 1980s, and moved it to a location more suitable for painting in 1985. Since then, the Rock has been repainted overnight on a regular basis with messages from individuals and campus organizations. Most messages are painted over nightly, but some messages have remained for longer: in 2014, a tribute to 8-year-old cancer victim Lacey "Princess Lacey" Holsworth remained in place for weeks, and a memorial to the 2023 Michigan State University shooting remained for months.

== History ==
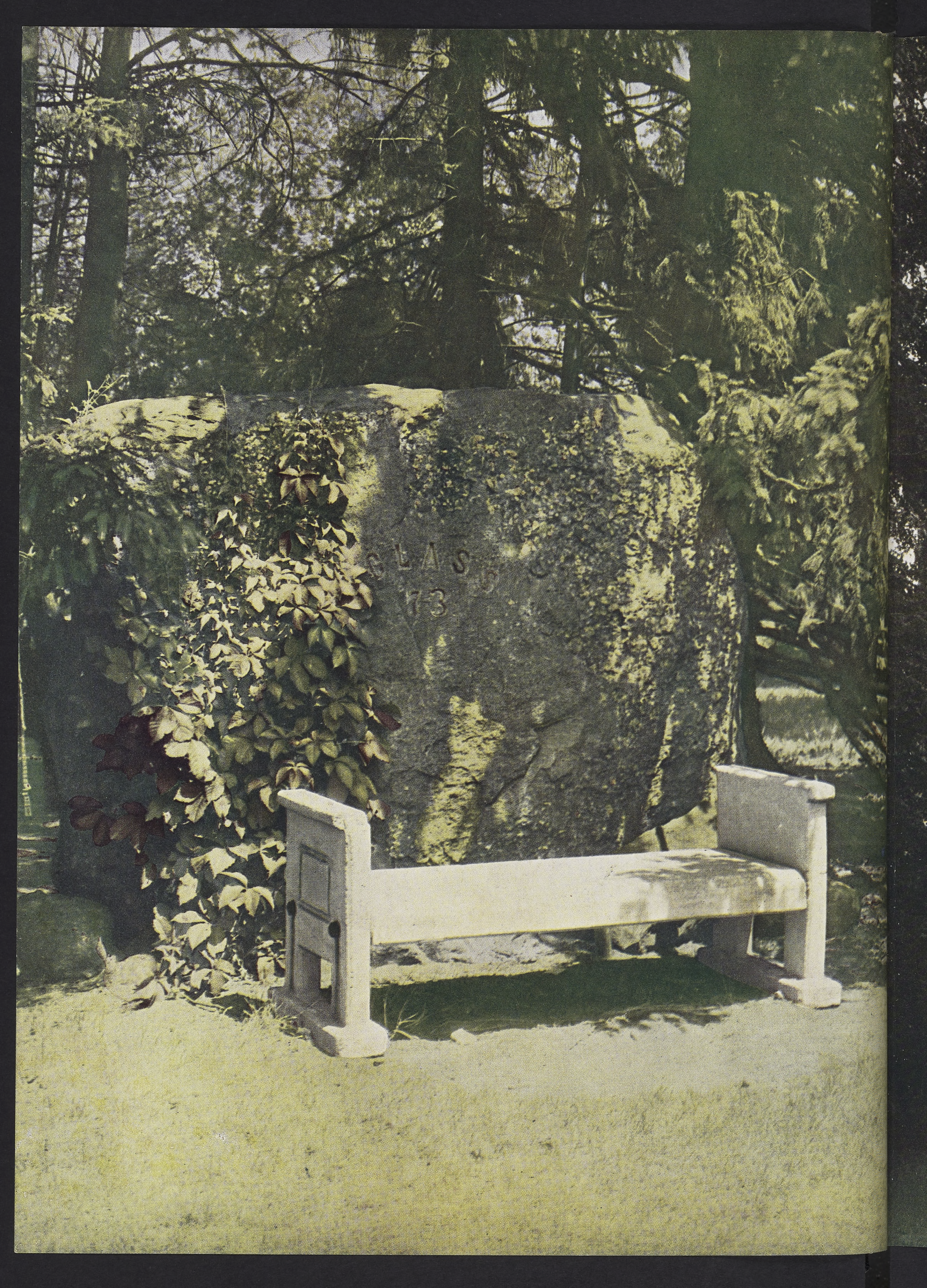
The Rock in 1928, covered in ivy

A large pudding stone was unearthed in May 1873 near the intersection of Grand River Avenue and Michigan Avenue in East Lansing, a site nicknamed the "Delta." The senior class of 1873 took interest in the stone, and they appealed to the Faculty-Academic Senate for permission to place the stone on a lawn at the college. Their request was granted, and on May 24, 1873, the seniors were excused from class to move the stone. The stone was moved across campus to a forested plot of land known as the "Sacred Space," the present-day location of Beaumont Tower. A team of 20 oxen was required to move the stone. The stone was heavy enough to sink into the ground again that night, although no record exists of the stone's weight.

The stone was again unearthed, and a member of the senior class carved "Class '73" into the large flat face of the stone. The initial carving was misspelled, and the corrections to the carving make the text off-center. The stone was officially dedicated on May 30, 1873.

A bench was added in front of the Rock in the late 1910s, which became a popular destination for engaged and married couples. The Rock was also known as the "class rock" in the early 20th century, and as the "Engagement Rock" in the mid-20th century, due to the number of marriage proposals that occurred there. The Rock was covered in ivy for decades, with photographs from the 1890s through the 1960s showing ivy growth on the left side of the rock nearly covering the "Class '73" inscription.

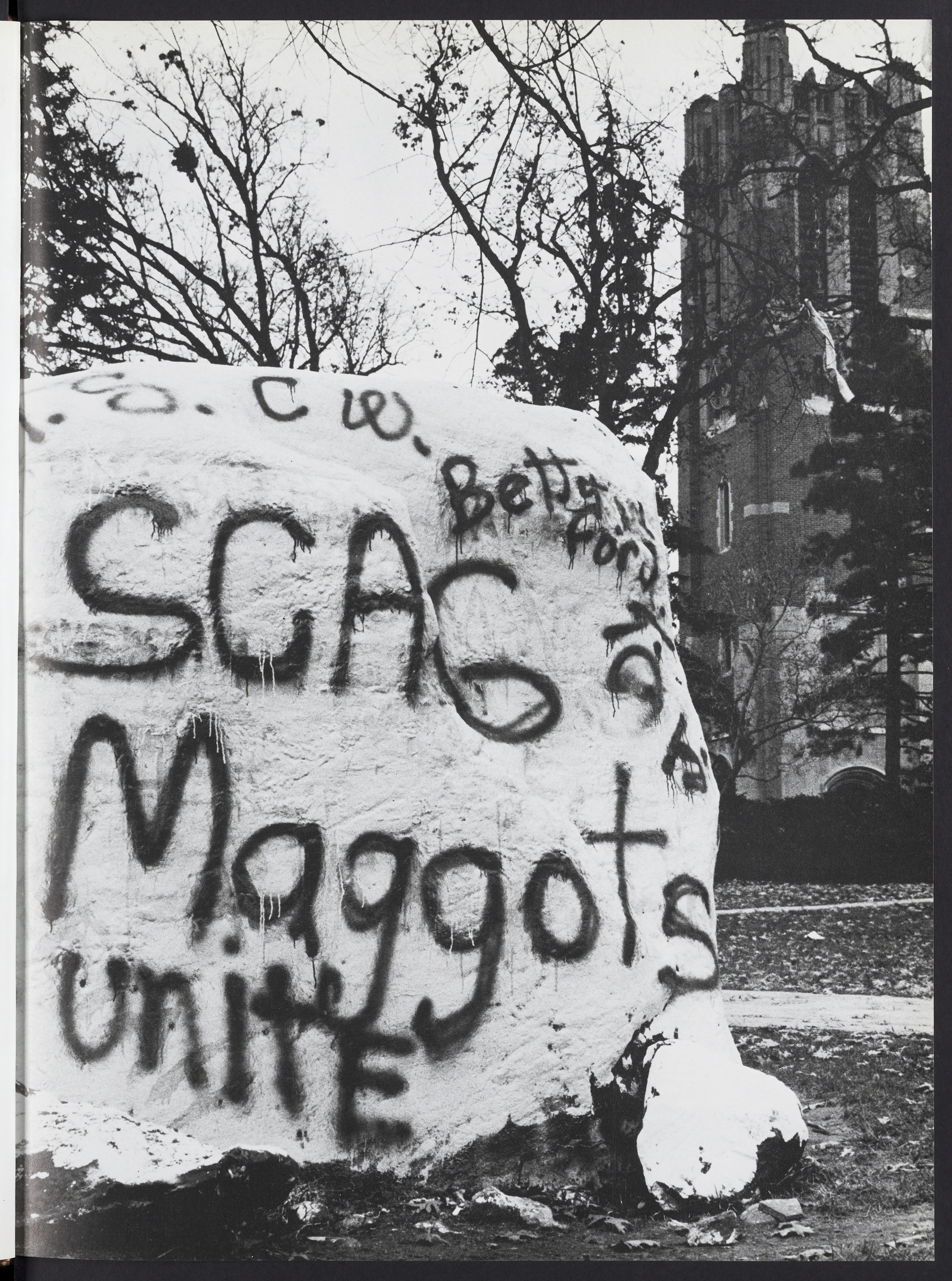
The Rock, c. 1979, reading "SCAG Maggots Unite"

The Rock was first painted in the 1960s, and personal and political messages soon began appearing regularly. The university did not approve of the painting, and expended significant resources to sandblast the graffiti off of the Rock. In an attempt to stop the painting, the university planned to move the Rock to a new location in front of the university police department before the start of the Fall 1977 term. Heavy rains delayed the plan, and the Rock was moved on September 23, 1977, while classes were in session. A crowd of students gathered and protested the move, and the university moved the Rock back to its original location outside Beaumont Tower the same day.

The university administration concluded that they could not stop the painting, and the Rock was moved to its current location in September 1985. The Rock's current location on Farm Lane at the Red Cedar River is in a clearing, addressing the university's concerns about paint damaging trees and sidewalks near the Beaumont Tower site.

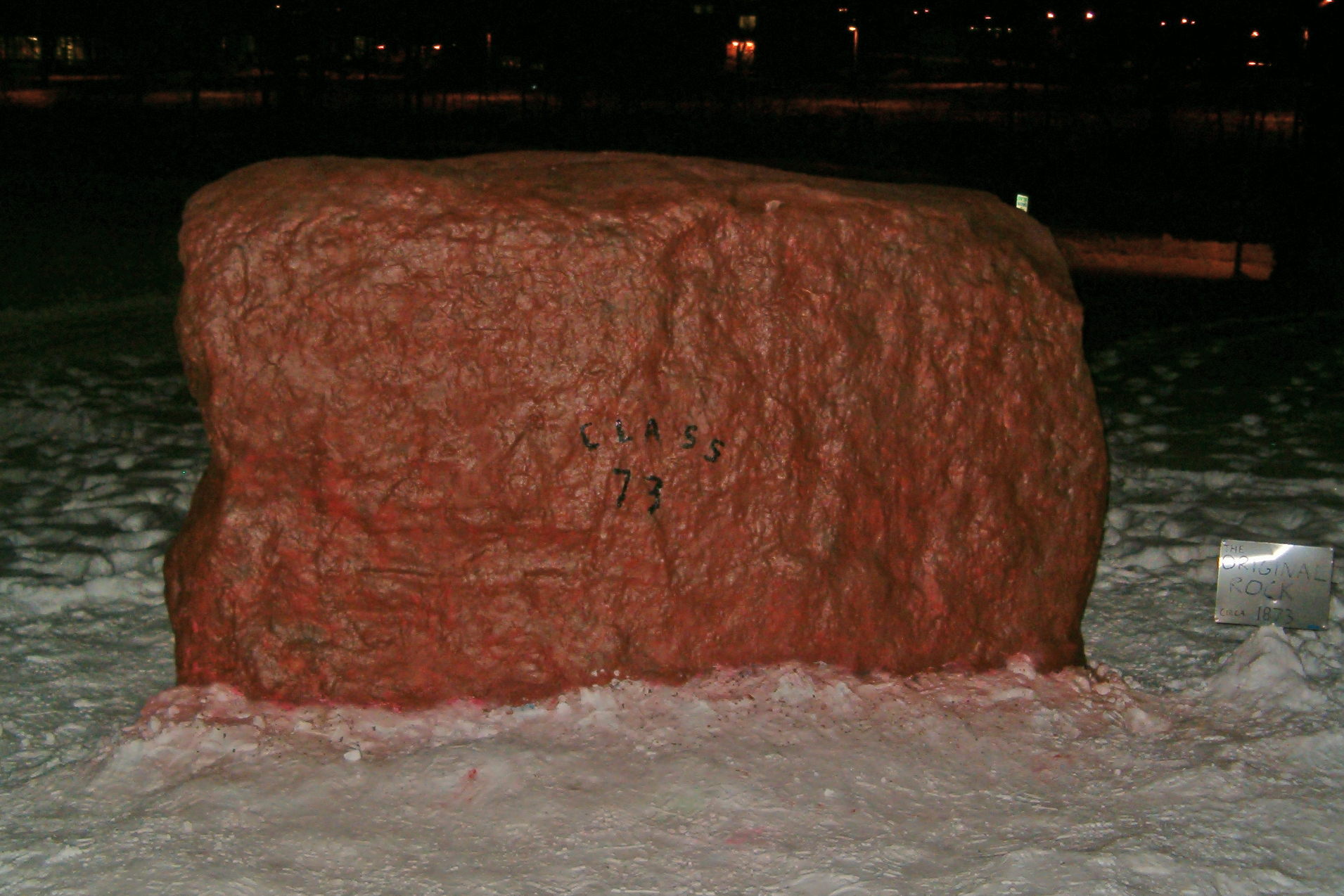
The Rock in 2011, repainted to its 1873 appearance

The Rock is painted nearly daily, leaving new paint little time to dry. As a result, large pieces of paint have fallen off the Rock, revealing the layers of paint. In one instance, the MSU surplus property department donated pieces of the paint to local jeweler Mel Swartz, who began making jewelry from the material in 2016. Swartz dried the paint in the sun for a year before working on it, making it similar to Fordite, an accumulation of layered and cured paint produced in automotive manufacturing. Another artwork inspired by the Rock is Pet Rock (2001) by MSU alumnus Jon Anthony, a 25-foot-long (7.6 m) long abstract oil painting depicting the layers of paint on the Rock. Pet Rock has been shown at the Kresge Art Museum, and is currently displayed in MSU's Wells Hall.

== Messages ==
Any interested party can paint the Rock, and tradition holds that it may only be painted under the cover of night. The Lansing State Journal summarizes the rules as such: "1. Anyone can paint it. 2. But they really should paint it only at night. 3. If you're not standing guard over what you painted, see Rule 1." Messages include personal remarks, political statements, memorials, and promotions of campus organizations such as fraternities. The Rock is often repainted nightly, but some messages have remained in place for longer periods, commemorating notable events in the university's history.

Following the September 11 attacks in 2001, the Rock was repainted with a memorial that included a large American flag. The 9/11 memorial remained in place for a week after the attacks, and was expanded to include a number of flags planted in the open grassy space that the Rock sits in.

The Rock was the site of a weeks-long tribute to 8-year-old cancer victim Lacey "Princess Lacey" Holsworth in 2014. Holsworth befriended MSU basketball forward Adreian Payne during her cancer treatment at Sparrow Hospital, and her story gained national media attention as the Spartans basketball team advanced during the 2014 March Madness tournament. Following Holsworth's death on April 8, 2014, the Rock became a tribute to her, with handwritten messages left by the MSU community, including Payne and longtime MSU basketball coach Tom Izzo. With the magnitude of Holsworth's death, some argued for the Rock to become a permanent memorial, including MSU graduate and Detroit News sports writer Tony Paul. The memorial to Holsworth remained on the Rock until April 21. Payne died in 2022 at the age of 31, and following his death, the Rock was repainted to read "Adreian + Lacey: together again."

2023 mass shooting memorials on the Rock

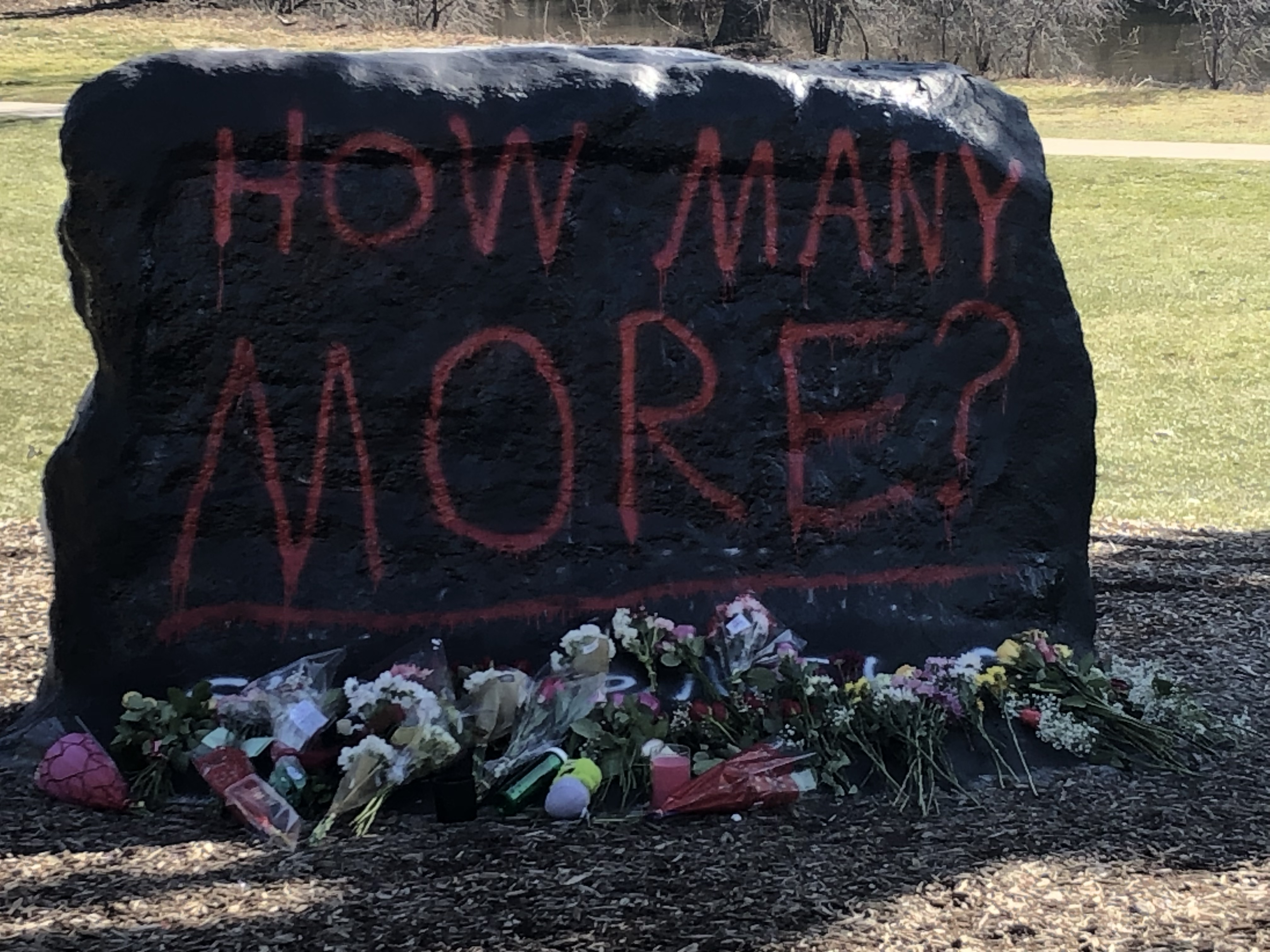
"How Many More?"

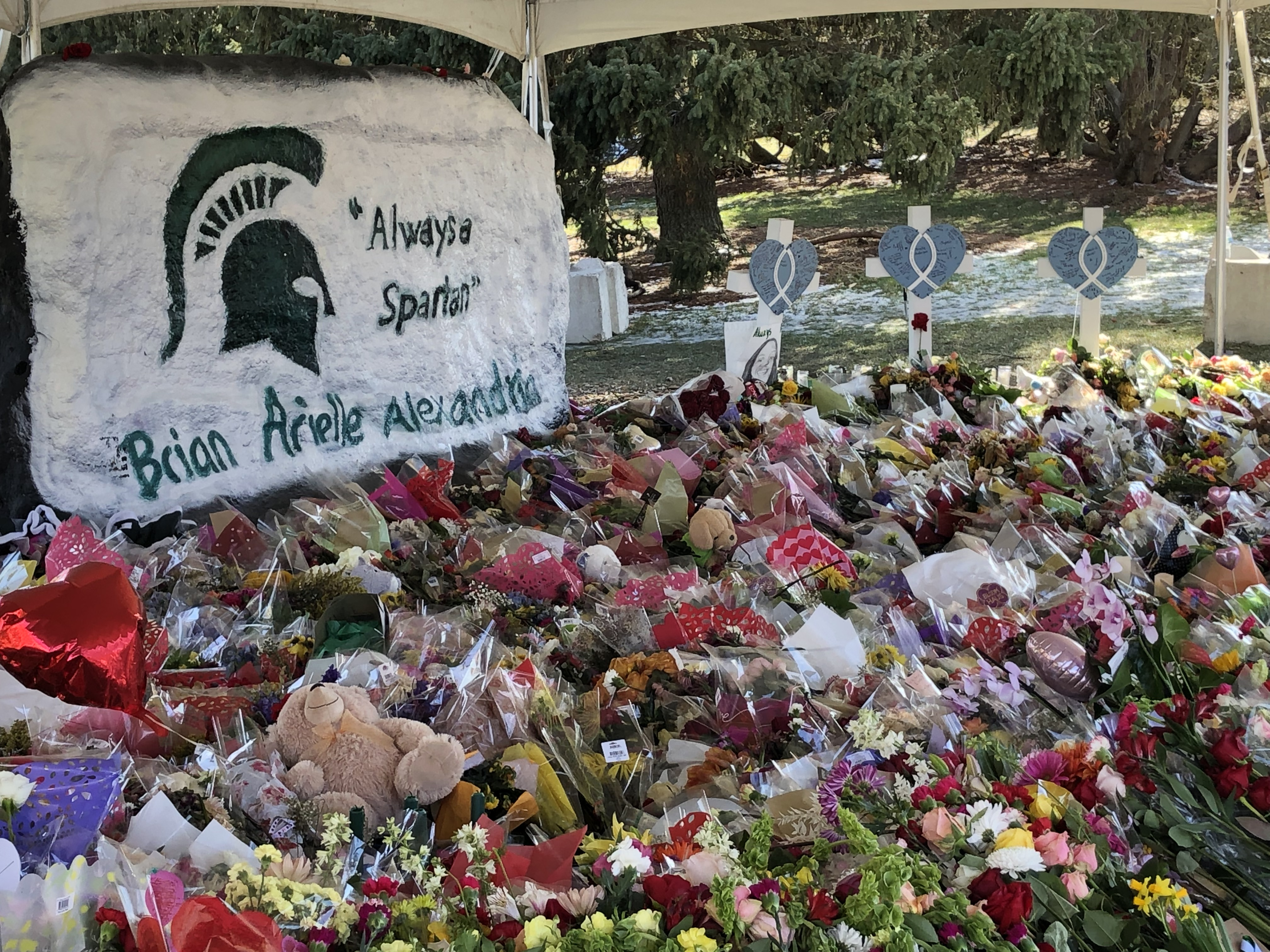
"Always A Spartan: Brian, Arielle, Alexandria"

Shortly after a mass shooting on February 13, 2023 that killed 3 MSU students and wounded 5, the Rock was painted black with the text "How many more?" and "Stay Safe MSU." On February 15, the message had been painted over to show a message apparently supporting gun rights. The gun-rights message was replaced the same day with a memorial to the three deceased victims. The same day, the university commissioned Madison Heights-based muralist Anthony Lee to create a more permanent memorial. Lee's artwork included the Spartan logo and the message "Always a Spartan. Brian. Arielle. Alexandria." The artwork by Lee was the centerpiece of a long-running memorial at the site, which remained on the Rock until July 2023, the longest-running message to date.

== Geology ==
The Rock is a large glacial erratic, deposited in East Lansing by a receding glacier during the late Pleistocene era. It is estimated to have been deposited in East Lansing 18,000 years before its discovery.

== See also ==
- The Rock (University of Michigan)
