= Reception =

Reception is a noun form of receiving, or to receive something, such as art, experience, information, people, products, or vehicles, or may show how something is received or a reaction. It may refer to:

== Astrology ==
- Reception (astrology), when a planet is located in a sign ruled by another planet
- Mutual reception, when two planets are in each other's signs of rulership

== Events and rites ==
- Reception, a formal party, where the guests are "received" (welcomed) by the hosts and guests of honor
  - Funeral reception, Memorial reception or Repast, a social gathering after a funeral, memorial service or celebration of life where family and friends remember their deceased loved ones while sharing food and drinks at various particular venues
  - Wedding reception, where the guests are "received" (welcomed) by the hosts and guests of honor
- Rite of Reception, see Reception into the full communion of the Catholic Church

== Films ==
- Reception (film), a 2011 short film
- The Reception (film), a 2005 film
- The Reception (1989 film), a 1989 Canadian film directed by Robert Morin

== Law ==
- Doctrine of reception, in English law
- Jurisprudential reception, a legal theory
- Reception statute, a statutory law adopted as a former British colony becomes independent

== Other uses ==
- Reception (gridiron football), a play where the ball is received (caught) by a player on the thrower's team
- Reception (school), in England, Wales and South Australia, the first year of primary school
- A desk or area where a receptionist serves as the initial contact person to visitors
- In telecommunications, the action of an electronic receiver, such as for radio or remote control
  - Television reception
- Reception theory, a version of reader response literary theory, also referred to as audience reception

== See also ==
- Receiver (disambiguation)
- Receivership
- Receiving (disambiguation)
