= 2023 Michigan State University shooting =

Mass shooting in Michigan, U.S.

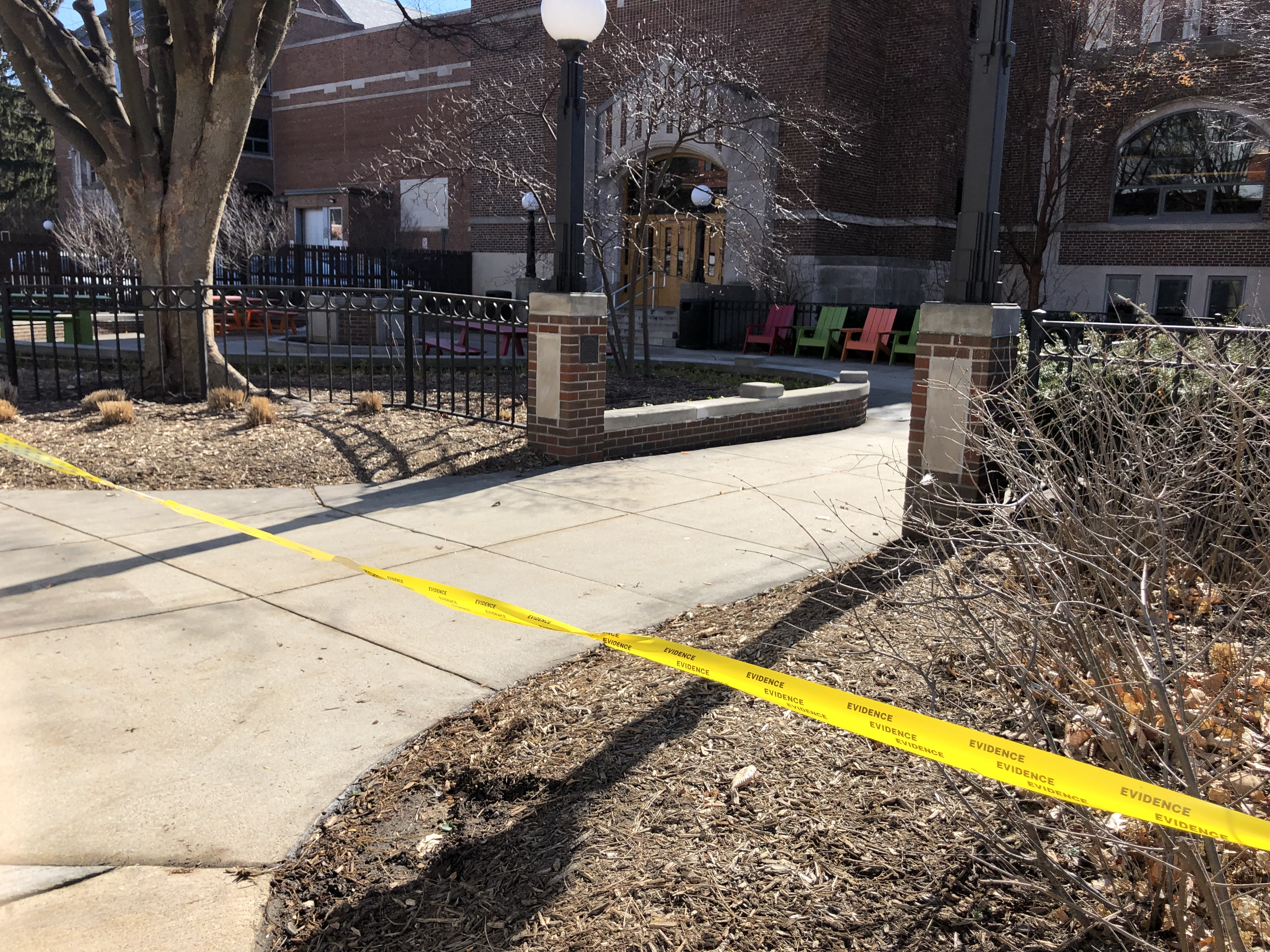
- North side of the MSU Union with police tape the day after the shooting
- Location: Michigan State University, East Lansing, Michigan, U.S.
- Date: February 13, 2023; 3 years ago 8:18 p.m – 12:27 a.m. (EST)
- Target: Students at Michigan State University
- Attack type: Mass shooting; triple murder; murder–suicide; school shooting
- Weapons: 9mm Taurus G3 semi-automatic pistol; 9mm Hi-Point C-9 semi-automatic pistol (unused)
- Deaths: 4 (including the perpetrator)
- Injuries: 5
- Perpetrator: Anthony Dwayne McRae
- Motive: Rejection

On Monday, February 13, 2023, a school shooting occurred in two buildings on the campus of Michigan State University (MSU) in East Lansing, Michigan, United States. Three students were killed and five others injured. The gunman, 43-year-old Anthony Dwayne McRae, died from a self-inflicted gunshot wound when he was confronted by police off campus three hours later.

In the aftermath of the shooting, classes at MSU were canceled for the remainder of the week, and they were relocated from the two buildings where the shootings took place for the remainder of the semester. Students and their supporters protested against gun violence at the Michigan State Capitol, and lawmakers promised gun control reforms.

It, along with the Oxford High School shooting, are the deadliest school shootings in Michigan history.

== Shootings ==
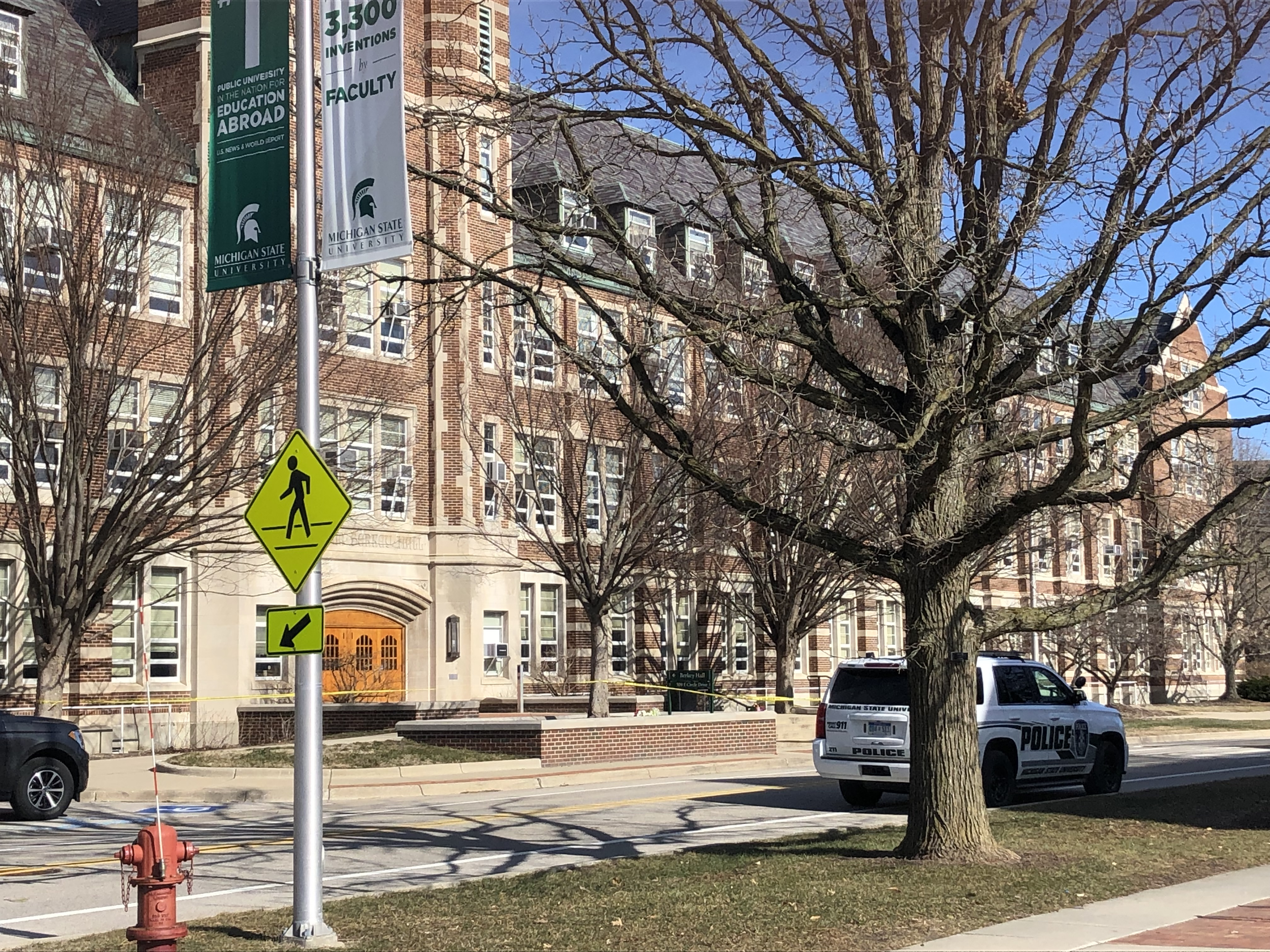
Berkey Hall, where the first shootings took place, with police tape a day after the shooting

At 7:19 p.m. EST on February 13, 2023, the gunman, later identified as 43-year-old Anthony McRae, arrived at Michigan State University by bus. From 7:24 to 8:12, he was seen walking eastbound on Grand River Avenue and in front of the Eli and Edythe Broad Art Museum before he entered Berkey Hall on the university's campus. McRae entered Room 114, where Marco Díaz-Muñoz was teaching, and fired repeatedly into the classroom, hitting seven students, including Arielle Anderson and Alexandria Verner, who were fatally wounded. Díaz-Muñoz tried to hold the door to the classroom shut while his students took shelter and broke windows to evacuate. Some students escaped through the broken windows, while others stayed to help their injured classmates, putting pressure on wounds and fashioning a tourniquet from a belt. Díaz-Muñoz estimated that police arrived 10 to 15 minutes after the shooting.

At 8:18, Ingham County Dispatch received a 9-1-1 call of shots being fired at Berkey Hall. Officers were dispatched a minute later and arrived another minute later at 8:20. MSU officials sent an alert tweet and text. Students were directed to "run, hide, fight." A shelter-in-place order was subsequently issued.

McRae left Berkey Hall and walked westbound along Grand River Avenue, firing a single gunshot outside the Human Ecology Building at 8:23. He arrived at the back, loading dock entrance of the MSU Union building at 8:24, where he killed student Brian Fraser. The first report of shots fired at the Union building was made at 8:26. At the same time, McRae left the north side of the Union, near the campus border. Officers responded to the Union building a minute later. At 8:30 and 8:31, two campuswide alerts were issued, advising people to shelter in place. East Lansing residents living near the campus were also asked to shelter in place.

There was a coordinated effort of local, state, and federal law enforcement with hundreds of officers assisting, as well as other emergency services. Approximately 30 fire engines, ambulances, and other emergency vehicles were present by the Eli and Edythe Broad Art Museum. At 10:04, McRae's description was provided in a third campuswide alert; at 11:18, campus police shared a photo of McRae on social media.

At 11:35, Ingham County Dispatch received a 9-1-1 call of a person matching the gunman's description walking off-campus on Lake Lansing Road, near High Street, in Lansing. At 11:49, officers arrived at the scene and found McRae, who fatally shot himself in the head during the confrontation. At 12:20, campus police confirmed McRae's death, and the shelter-in-place order was lifted seven minutes later. An investigation found that McRae was armed with two 9mm handguns: a Hi-Point C-9 purchased in September 2021 and a Taurus G3 purchased in October 2021. Both guns were legally purchased but not registered. A total of 18 rounds were fired on campus, all from the Taurus: 14 at Berkey Hall, one outside the Human Ecology Building, and three at the Union building. McRae was also carrying eleven additional magazines for both guns, along with 136 rounds of loose ammunition.

== Victims ==
All of the victims of the shooting were Michigan State students. Three were killed: Arielle Diamond Anderson, a junior from Grosse Pointe, Michigan (and the niece of Chandra Davis); Brian Fraser, a sophomore and Phi Delta Theta chapter president from Grosse Pointe; and Alexandria Verner, a junior from Clawson, Michigan.

Another five students were injured in the shooting. Four of the five injured victims required surgery, and one was taken directly to the ICU. All five were in critical condition. By February 21, one of the victims had been upgraded from critical to stable condition and two students had been upgraded to serious condition.

One injured victim was Guadalupe Huapilla-Perez, a junior from Immokalee, Florida. Two others who were injured were Chinese international students Hanyang Tao and Yukai "John" Hao; Hao was paralyzed from the chest down. Another injured student, junior Nate Statly, from Hartland, was identified by his family, who set up a GoFundMe account. Statly was shot in the head; his brother characterized him as "fighting hard to survive".

On February 23, another one of the victims, music student Troy Forbush, a graduate of Okemos High School, was released from the hospital. Of the four remaining students in the hospital, one remained in critical condition, two were in serious condition, and one was in stable condition. On March 3, two more of the injured students were released from the hospital, leaving one student still in critical condition and the other in fair condition.

=== Aftermath ===
In May 2023, paralyzed student John Hao was able to attend an NBA playoff game, in his wheelchair, as a guest of Philadelphia 76ers player James Harden. Harden, upon hearing of Hao's injuries, had reached out to the student shortly after the shooting, and donated support and money to his recovery.

In July 2023, the family of injured student Nate Statly shared information about Statly's status. According to the family's lawyer, "fragments of the bullet remain scattered throughout [Statly's] brain. The core of the 9mm bullet remains in the center of his brain.... Statly isn't able to talk, walk, use his arm or leg on the left side of his body or consume whole foods. His right ear and eye are sutured closed, and he has significant and permanent scarring." Statly, in rehab, faced many long-term challenges, including mobility and sensory impairments. A GoFundMe page had raised over $305,000 for his care, but the family was seeking additional funds for a wheelchair-accessible van and home modifications.

In August 2023, the family of injured student Guadalupe Huapilla-Perez shared details of her ongoing recovery six months after the shooting. An initial surgery repaired Huapilla-Perez's abdominal organs, although the removal of her spleen was required. Returning home to Florida brought her emotional relief, but leg nerve damage complicated her recovery. A second surgery in July repaired Huapilla-Perez's colon. The family emphasized healing's non-linearity and asked for continued support.

== Perpetrator ==
Anthony Dwayne McRae (June 10, 1979 – February 13, 2023), a 43-year-old African-American male who resided in Lansing, was the gunman. McRae had no known connection to the university. McRae was born in Bear, Delaware, raised in Trenton, New Jersey, and moved to Michigan in 2003.

McRae was arrested in June 2019 for carrying a weapon without a concealed pistol license. Initially charged with a felony, he pleaded guilty to misdemeanor unlawful possession of a loaded firearm as part of a plea agreement in November 2019. He was originally sentenced to twelve months' probation, which was later extended to 18 months, and in May 2021, he was discharged from probation. Because McRae was not convicted of a felony, his ban on possessing weapons ended with the end of his probation.

The decision to allow McRae to plead to a misdemeanor instead of a felony has proven controversial. Former Ingham County prosecutor Carol Siemon was criticized for her decision to limit the use of felony charges for firearms possession. In response Siemon described the plea deal as standard practice, saying that "nationally, about 95 percent of all criminal charges are resolved by pleas".

McRae's father said his son had anger issues, and, after the death of his mother in 2020, he became reclusive and socially isolated and "started to get evil and mean, and he didn't care about anything anymore." He described his son as "evil angry." According to the father, McRae had worked for about seven years at a warehouse loading trucks but quit his job shortly after his mother's death. McRae's sister, who had not seen McRae since her mother's funeral in 2020, described her brother as socially isolated and hostile, and often transient. At the time of the shooting, McRae lived in his father's home in Lansing, 5 miles (8 km) northwest of MSU's campus.

A note found in McRae's possession included threats to MSU, other local businesses including the Meijer warehouse where he had previously been employed, and two New Jersey public schools. McRae also claimed to lead a group of 20 people who were involved in his attacks, a claim that was dismissed by a Michigan State Police spokesperson.

In the immediate aftermath of the shooting, an internet hoax that incorrectly identified the perpetrator as "Lynn Dee Walker" spread on social media.

== Aftermath ==
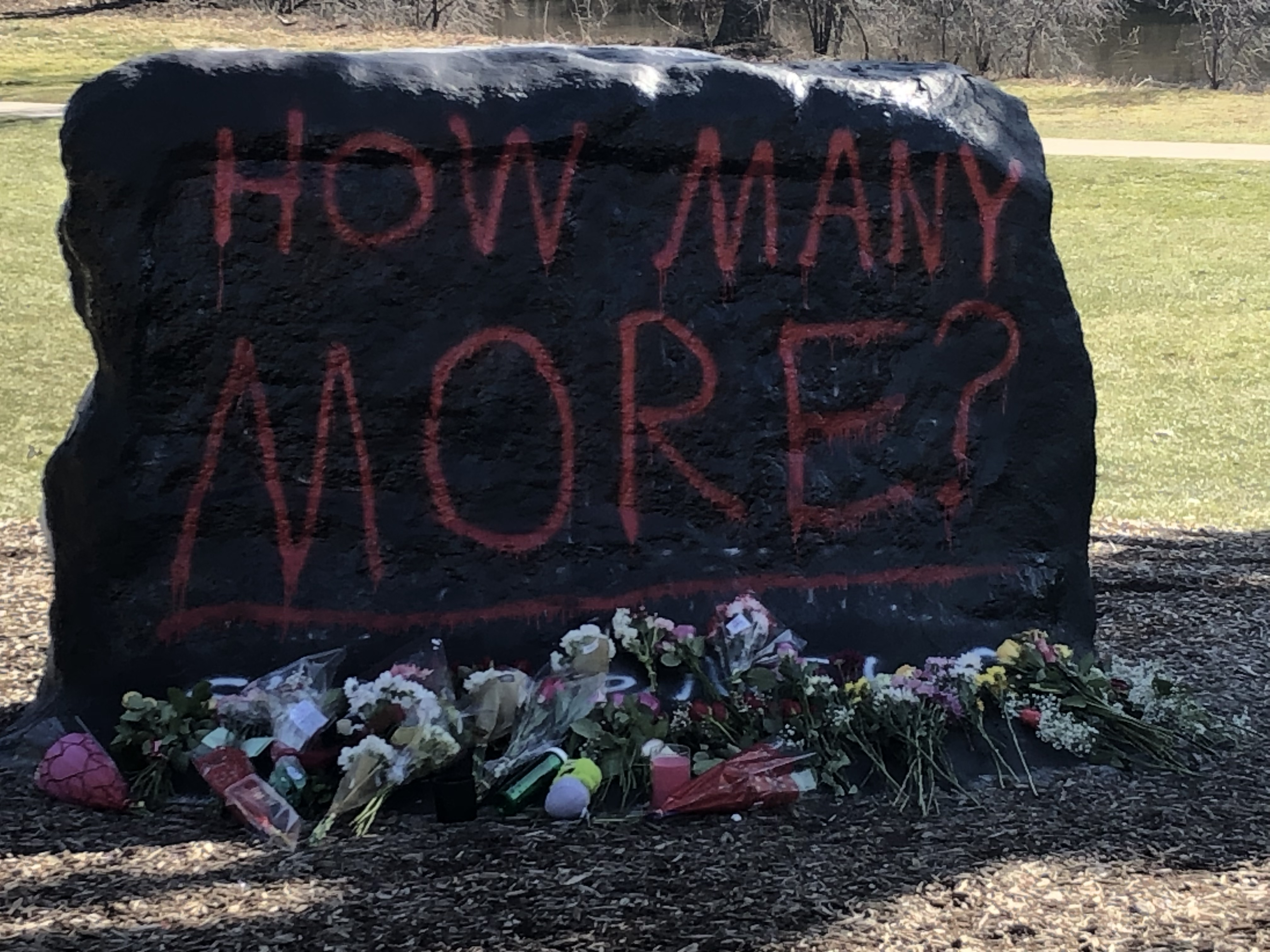
The Rock painted as a memorial to victims of the shooting

The shelter-in-place order was rescinded following the gunman's death. All MSU activities were canceled for 48 hours, and classes were canceled until the following Monday. Classes in Berkey Hall and the Union were relocated for the remainder of the spring semester, and Berkey Hall was to remain closed for the remainder of the year. Undergraduates were given the option to have grades reported as credit/no credit instead of the usual grade for spring semester classes.

Counseling services were offered to members of the East Lansing and Michigan State communities at Hannah Community Center in East Lansing from February 14, with additional on-campus locations being added the following day. East Lansing closed all city offices and canceled a city council meeting on February 14, and continued to operate on a limited basis on February 15. Public schools in East Lansing and neighboring school districts canceled classes on the day after the shooting. Schools in Ewing Township, New Jersey were also closed after McRae was found carrying a note threatening two Ewing Public Schools.

=== Memorials and vigils ===
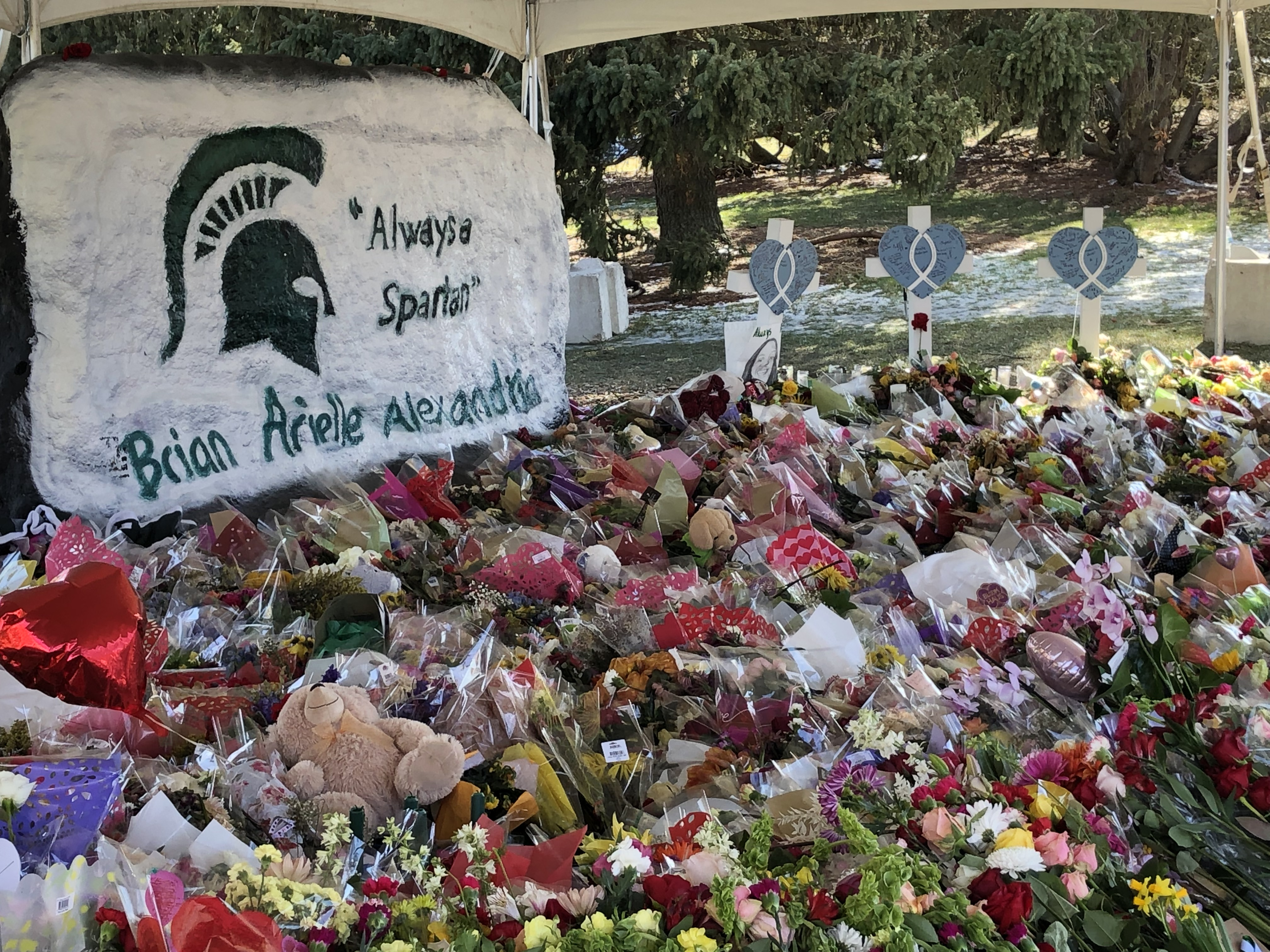
Flowers, balloons, candles and teddy bears placed at the Rock in a memorial to the victims of the shooting

The Rock was painted to commemorate the victims with "How many more?" written in red paint and flowers were left at both it and the Sparty statue near the football stadium. The following day this was repainted with a pro-gun message "Allow us to defend ourselves & carry on campus". In a break with tradition that the Rock should not be repainted on a single day, this message was painted over and replaced with "To those we lost. To those healing. Brian. Arielle. Alexandria." The Rock was painted a third time that day by Detroit-based artist Anthony Lee at the university's request. Lee's artwork included the Spartan logo and the message "Always a Spartan. Brian. Arielle. Alexandria." Staff from the MSU Herbarium collected and pressed three flowers from the memorial at the Rock as part of the herbarium's role to preserve plants of cultural and historical value.

Memorials and vigils for the victims were planned for the victims across Michigan with some also offering the ability to write letters to MSU students or representatives, and interact with comfort dogs. A vigil at the Rock on the evening of February 15 drew thousands of students and community members. Speakers included Michigan Governor Gretchen Whitmer, interim MSU president Teresa Woodruff, basketball coach Tom Izzo, representatives of the Board of Trustees, the Graduate Student Body President, and the Undergraduate Student Body President, Jo Kovach. Vigils were also held at the University of Michigan, and in Grosse Pointe and Clawson, homes of the murdered students. Although the state House of Representatives was not in session, members gathered to recognize the dead and injured, and to honor law enforcement, emergency responders and medical staff who responded to the shooting.

University officials created the Spartan Strong Fund to pay medical bills for the survivors of the shooting, and announced that they would cover any shortfall. Many student-run organizations raised funds for this charity, including a charity livestream, bake sales, and other fundraising efforts. Shortly after the shooting, GoFundMe launched a hub of verified fundraisers that would benefit those impacted by the shooting.

=== Gun violence protest ===
Michigan State students organized a sit-down protest at the State Capitol on February 15 pushing for legislation and commonsense gun laws. Speakers at the rally also included students from Oxford High School, the site of a school shooting in 2021. Maya Manuel, the organizer of the rally, wanted politicians to "understand what's life like in our shoes and to understand how we feel". Students sat cross-legged in front of the Capitol steps, assuming the position they have been trained to adopt in the active-shooter trainings that people of their generation have been trained in through their schooling. Manuel asked this of the legislators saying "before you act like you understand us, please take a moment to sit with us and to listen to us". Legislators present were asked to sit or stand in front of the students. United States Representative Elissa Slotkin, Michigan Attorney General Dana Nessel, state Senator Winnie Brinks, and state House Speaker Joe Tate were among those in attendance.

Michigan State students and their supporters returned to the Capitol on February 17 for an "End Gun Violence" protest. Ellie Baden, one of the organizers, addressed the crowd and said "we need our elected officials to vow that this cannot and will not happen again". Legislators addressing the crowd included Sam Singh, the Democratic state senator representing East Lansing, and Julie Brixie, the Democratic state representative for Okemos.

=== Permanent memorial ===
According to The Detroit News, Michigan State plans to create a permanent memorial on campus to honor the victims. In June 2023, the school announced that $300,000 from the "Spartan Strong Fund" had already been set aside to finance a memorial. A commission composed of students, faculty, staff, and community liaisons, calling itself the Feb. 13 Permanent Memorial Planning Committee, would seek input from the MSU community on ideas for the memorial, with plans to solicit artist proposals by the end of the semester.

=== Lawsuits ===
In June 2023, the families of the shooting victims announced they were filing lawsuits against Michigan State University for security failures related to the attack. First to file were survivors Nate Statly and Troy Forbush. A few days later, the family of Alexandria Verner announced it was suing the school for failing "to provide proper security on campus". A week later, lawyers filed a lawsuit against MSU on behalf of Yukai "John" Hao. Finally, the families of victims Arielle Anderson, Brian Fraser, and Hanyang Tao announced they were suing the university for "negligence regarding safety conditions before the shooting, including the lack of classroom doors that could be locked from the inside, the lack of a proper emergency alert system/public address speakers and the lack of an armed security officer, metal detectors or security stations."

In December 2023, the university announced it had settled the lawsuits filed against it by the families of the students who had been killed — Alexandria Verner, Brian Fraser, and Arielle Anderson — for $5 million each.

== Responses ==
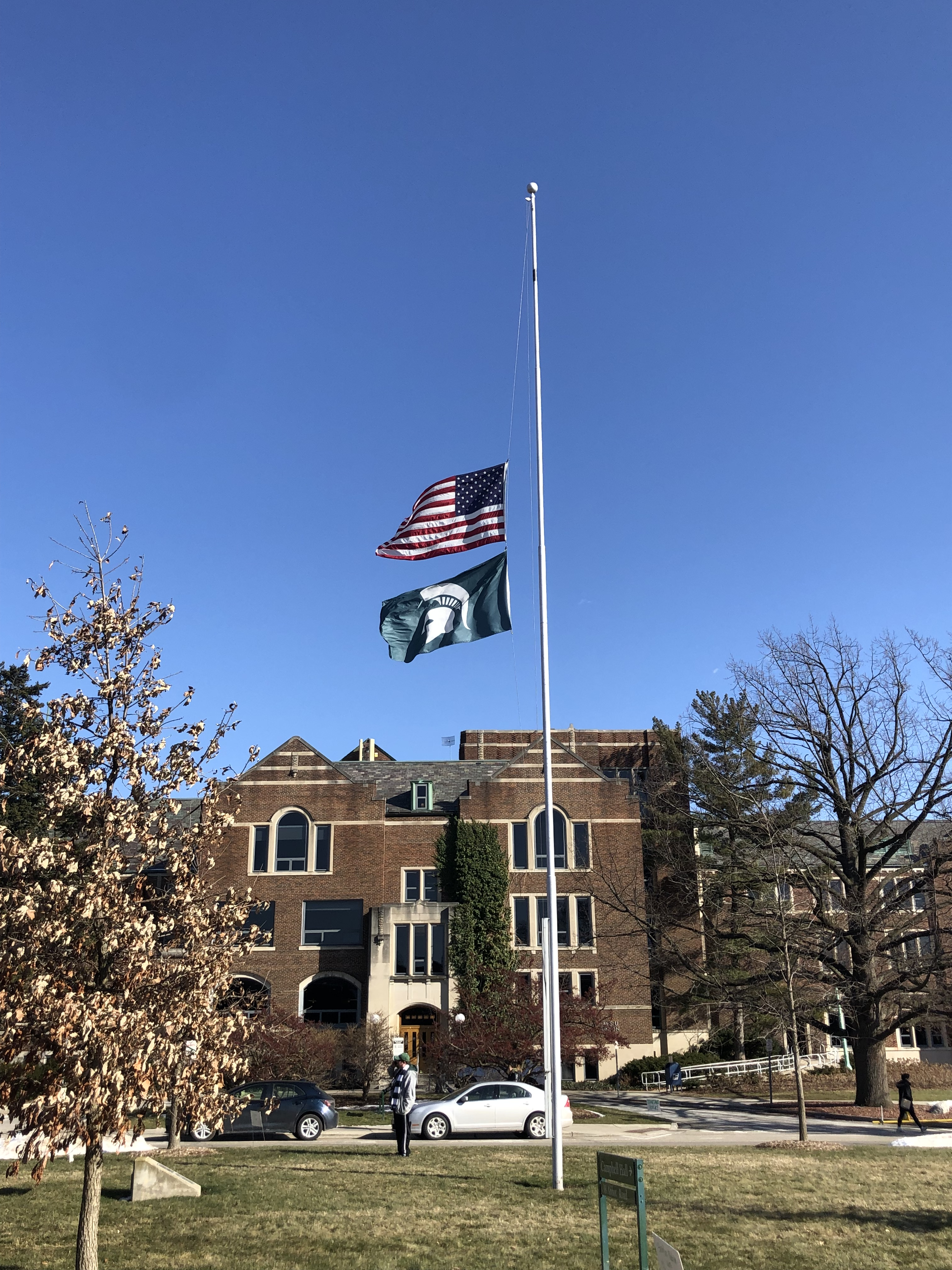
United States and Michigan State University flags fly at half-staff in front of the MSU Union in the aftermath of the attack

On February 14, the day after the shooting, Whitmer ordered all flags in Michigan to be flown at half-staff in honor of the victims. United States President Joe Biden expressed condolences, and called for gun control. Biden noted that he was speaking on the fifth anniversary of the Stoneman Douglas High School shooting.

Whitmer and several Michigan members of Congress expressed condolences. Whitmer also expressed concern about gun violence, calling it a "uniquely American problem" and stated that living with such a potential threat was not sustainable. Michigan Secretary of State Jocelyn Benson described the incident as "unfathomable" and proceeded to call for greater action targeting gun violence.

Ingham County government issued a statement saying they were "deeply saddened" by the shooting and thanked emergency responders and healthcare workers. Ingham County Health Officer Linda Vail comments on the fact that "gun violence...is complex and deeply rooted in our culture which is why we must take a public health approach".

Dana Nessel wrote in a statement that "The events at Michigan State University are a tragedy for the entire state of Michigan. My thoughts are with the victims, their families, friends, and loved ones." She told CNN in an interview that she was "not sure why" McRae's probation had been extended multiple times. She noted that the shooting had left "a lot of unanswered questions. And we're going to be digging deep into this to find out."

Elissa Slotkin (D-MI), expressed outrage at the lack of change since the 2021 Oxford High School shooting, saying, "As the representative of Oxford, Michigan, I cannot believe that I am here again doing this 15 months later [...] And I would say that you either care about protecting kids or you don't." Michigan House of Representatives member Ranjeev Puri released a statement which included the phrase "Fuck your thoughts and prayers."

Many students and parents expressed their fear and anxiety about the shooting and trying to find out friends and loved ones' statuses, stating that it felt surreal and unimaginable. Many students also documented their thoughts, experiences, and anger about the shooting through the website Spartan Stronger, which was created by a student to allow students and staff to share their stories.

Students of Vanderbilt University criticized the university for sending them an email written with the assistance of ChatGPT, which was prepared in response to the mass shooting incident at Michigan State University; the Vanderbilt students felt that such sensitive statements should be written by humans themselves, not through artificial intelligence.

=== Gun control debate ===
Democrats in the Michigan State Senate introduced "nearly [a] dozen" bills focused on gun control and gun safety on February 16. Many of the bills were reportedly drafted in response to the Oxford High School shooting. Prior attempts at gun law reform was blocked by Republicans in 2022 in the aftermath of the Uvalde school shooting, and before that, when gun reform was attempted in the aftermath of the Oxford shooting, but Democrats gained control of both houses of state government in the 2022 elections. Nineteen days before the MSU shooting, Whitmer had criticized the state legislature for failing to pass gun laws after the Oxford High School shooting and called for the passage of universal background checks, safe storage laws, and extreme-risk protection orders.

=== Connections to other shootings ===
Some students who were on campus at the time of the shooting were impacted by other mass shootings; one had been at Oxford High School during the 2021 shooting, while another had FaceTimed with friends in Oxford High School while at another school, and another student named Jackie Matthews was a survivor of the 2012 Sandy Hook Elementary School shooting.

== See also ==
- 2023 University of Nevada, Las Vegas shooting
- List of school-related attacks
- List of school shootings in the United States (2000–present)
- List of mass shootings in the United States in 2023
- List of school shootings in the United States by death toll
