= Rejectionism =

Rejectionism or rejectionist may refer to:

- A policy or attitude of rejection of something
- Rejectionists, Iraqi insurgent group
- Rejectionist Front, Palestinian political coalition
- Rejectionist (Philippines), a faction that split from the Communist Party of the Philippines
- Rafida, an Islamic term, "those who reject"
- Epistemic rejectionism, a philosophical position
