= Acceptance (disambiguation) =

Acceptance is the experience of a situation without an intention to change that situation.

Acceptance may also refer to:

== The arts ==
- Acceptance (band), an alternative-rock band
- Acceptance (film), a 2009 drama television film starring Mae Whitman and Joan Cusack
- "Acceptance" (Everwood), a season 3 episode of the television series Everwood
- "Acceptance" (House), an episode of the television series House
- "Acceptance" (Heroes), an episode of the television series Heroes
- Acceptance (novel), the third book in Jeff VanderMeer's Southern Reach trilogy

== Other uses ==
- Beam acceptance, in physics, the maximum emittance that a beam transport system or analysing system is able to transmit
- Acceptance testing, a validation test in engineering
- Offer and acceptance, a legal term related to contract law
- Bankers' acceptance, a type of bank draft
- "Acceptance for value," a fraudulent debt payment method promoted in the redemption movement

== See also ==
- Accept (disambiguation)
- Acceptability, the property of a thing to be able to be accepted
