= Rejection (short story collection) =

2024 short story collection by Tony Tulathimutte

- Author: Tony Tulathimutte
- Genre: Short story collection, literary fiction
- Publisher: William Morrow and Company
- Publication date: September 17, 2024
- Pages: 272
- ISBN: 978-0063337879

Rejection is a 2024 short story collection by Thai American writer Tony Tulathimutte, published by William Morrow and Company. Considered a novel-in-stories, the book includes pieces which Tulathimutte had published in magazines like n+1 and The Paris Review, including the controversial story "The Feminist". It was longlisted for the National Book Award for Fiction.

== Content ==
Tulathimutte, while at the Iowa Writers' Workshop in 2011, came up with the idea for a book titled Rejection while lying face-down in bed. Just a year before, in 2010, Tulathimutte had started writing stories that intertwined identity politics with comedy.

Considered a novel-in-stories, the book comprises seven stories. The first three stories, "The Feminist", "Pics", and "Ahegao" compose a "trilogy" of "different types of rejection". In the second half of the book, Tulathimutte explores more metafictional and experimental forms with "Main Character", "Our Dope Future"—which takes the form of a Reddit post—"Sixteen Metaphors", and "Re:Rejection", a story in the form of a letter which rejects the book being read. Tulathimutte cited "The Depressed Person" by David Foster Wallace and The Easter Parade by Richard Yates as inspirations for the short story collection.

"The Feminist", a story about a male feminist who becomes misogynistic after a series of rejections, was originally written from 2011 to 2013, with Tulathimutte knowing that it would be part of a "half fiction and half nonfiction" book in the future. The nonfiction half would eventually split off and become "The Rejection Plot" published in The Paris Review in 2024. In 2019, "The Feminist" would be published by n+1 to much controversy; in anticipation, Tulathimutte tweeted "feminism is good, this character is not good." In winter of 2023, "Ahegao" was published in The Paris Review.

== Plot ==
The first short story, titled "The Feminist", centres upon an as-yet unnamed male character who insists he is a feminist but is frequently irked about, and resentful of, women's dismissal of him as a potential romantic partner. He blames women's decades-long rejection of him on superficial issues, such as his 'narrow shoulders', and women's apparent callousness and selfishness, calling women who reject him shallow hypocrites. His loneliness and anger manifests itself physically - he develops something adjacent to erectile dysfunction as well as cognitive issues. Things take a dark turn when his friend, whom he only refers to as his "QPOC agender friend", calls him out for his endless self-pitying, insisting that his interest in feminism is entirely self-serving and a thinly veiled attempt to emotionally manipulate women into having sex with him. Outraged by this confrontation, the narrator regresses more and more into the online world of misogyny and inceldom, attacking women and men who support women online. The story ends with the narrator entering a restaurant he frequently visits with a black ski mask on, implying that he intends to bring his violent thoughts about women to real life.

The second short story, titled "Pics", centers upon Alison, a lonely woman in her late twenties who works in magazine journalism and used to struggle with an eating disorder. Alison is also part of a group chat with her much younger, and much more confident, ex-work colleagues. One night she has a sexual encounter with her close friend Neil, where she consents to having a nude picture of herself taken; afterwards he tells her it was a one-off event and doesn't want to spoil their friendship. Although Alison initially agrees to these terms, she soon becomes filled with rage and resentment over being rejected by someone she believed deeply cared about her. She vents her frustrations to her group chat, who offer good advice, but doesn't listen to any of it. Instead she gets drunk whilst hanging out with Neil and his conventionally attractive and thin Asian "friend" Cece. Alison humiliates Neil and then herself by making casually racist remarks to Cece; when she later discusses the incident with her groupchat over text (she deliberately omits the parts where she made herself look bad) they also agree that her remarks about Cece were racist and uncalled for. Alison quickly backtracks over her comments but is still deeply resentful of Cece and her relationship with Neil, obsessively stalking the two of them online. Over time Alison still cannot get over the incident and retreats further into isolation, self-hatred and self-pity. She adopts a raven named "Pootie" and invites her group-chat friends over for dinner. Unexpectedly, one of them, who is heavily pregnant, brings her five-year-old son with her. The hangout is a disaster - Alison cooks a terrible meal, is forced to lock away her bird so it doesn't attack her friend's child and ends up in A&E with a severe finger injury. Later she discovers an oil stain on her couch left by her heavily pregnant friend. This triggers Alison into launching into an angry tirade in the group chat, where she insults everyone in it and they, in turn, insult her. The story ends with Alison attending the wedding of Neil and the visibly pregnant Cece, where Neil reveals he deleted the intimate photo of the two of them the day after they slept together. Alison infers that this confirms what she feared all along: that he genuinely never liked her in that way at all, ever. She finally realizes the all-consuming yearning, resentment, and anger she had felt are gone, leaving her numb.

The third story, titled "Ahegao", concerns a Thai-American man named "Kant" who has recently come out as gay to his family and friends over email and privately accepted that he is also a sexual sadist. Low in self-worth and sexual experience, it is strongly implied that Kant is addicted to porn and subsequently unable or unwilling to engage in real-life emotional and sexual relationships. Nonetheless, he begins a furtive relationship with Julien, a kind white gay man he meets at the gym one day. After a botched attempt at sex, the two do not engage in much sexual activity, much to the disappointment of Julien. After much pleading from Julien, Kant finally reveals to him that he wants to be the dominant sexual partner. The two attempt to act out a kind of dom-sub roleplay, a watered down version of Kant's true desires, but Julien is confused and overwhelmed by Kant's hyper-specific instructions and Kant is unable to maintain an erection as a result of this. Disappointed and embarrassed over the experience, as well as resentful of Julien's attractive, wealthy and casually racist friends and ex-boyfriends, Kant leaves and the two never see each other again. Kant subsequently turns to porn to fulfil his extreme sexual desires and inquires upon "Cody Heat", an adult film star who offers customisable pornography for adults, for his services. Kant sends Cody a long email detailing his dream pornographic film, written in appallingly specific and highly graphic sexual detail that includes numerous ultra-specific and deeply degrading sexual acts, bombastic special effects and absurd dialogue (some of which Kant offers to dub himself). Kant predicts that the film will cost him upwards of eight thousand dollars but insists it is the only way he will gain true sexual satisfaction and emotional catharsis from his years of being a victim of childhood bullying. Exhausted from writing the script, Kant accidentally sends the email to his "coming out" mailing list - i.e., his family and friends - and falls asleep.

The final section of the book takes a more experimental approach. The first part concerns a Reddit post created by a wealthy man named "Max" who coerces Alison, the same woman from the second story, into an emotionally and mentally abusive relationship with him, cutting her off from her friends, family and coworkers and tracking her every move. Max details how heartbroken and angry he is that the relationship ended and, once he reads everyone's responses to his post, refuses to acknowledge that his behaviour was abusive and controlling. Max is eventually arrested for sex trafficking and treason after he tries to create a new "business venture" involving young women from third-world countries. The next part focuses on Bee, Kant's sibling and Craig's (the man character from the first story's) unnamed "QPOC agender friend". Like Kant, they grow up friendless and lonely, although Bee also becomes increasingly hostile, misanthropic and argumentative with everyone around them, further worsening their loneliness, which they claim to be at peace with. Bee admits to living nearly their whole life online arguing with strangers and creating business ventures designed to deceive others, such as a 24/7 live interactive cam girl experience that is really just the same footage played over and over again. Bee confesses that they are responsible for a series of hoaxes that became viral online, namely incidents involving "Twitter beef" with warring fandoms that were really just them pretending to be multiple accounts, and concludes their post by stating that they refuse to give up their real identity, making themselves untrackable and untraceable by using AI to generate over a billion confession posts, all similar in theme but wildly divergent in their exact details. This section is followed by another anonymous user's conspiracy theories about Bee, before finally concluding with a meta-commentary on the whole book, ending with the readers supposedly "rejecting" the entire book.

== Critical reception ==
Publishers Weekly and The New York Times included the book on their respective Best Books of 2024 lists. Esquire listed it as a Best Book of Fall 2024. Time called the book one of the 100 must-reads of 2024.

Critics lauded Tulathimutte's handling of topics like loneliness, sexuality, dating, positionality, and, per the book's namesake, rejection. The book received a starred review from Publishers Weekly, which called the book "a first-rate exploration of yearning and solitude". Dwight Garner, for The New York Times, lauded Tulathimutte's approach to identity politics and the cultural zeitgeist, stating: "Tulathimutte is a big talent and he is clearly just getting started." Many critics, including Garner, found Tulathimutte's writing captivating in its ability to balance intelligence, vulgarity, and humor. The New Yorker, in particular, wrote that it was "fun ... to read a book about a bunch of huge fucking losers." Similarly, in a starred review, Kirkus Reviews praised the book as "an inventive and shameless story collection for the chronically online".

Spencer Quong, writing for The Margins in the Asian American Writers' Workshop, stated that while the book did a good job of observing rejection in society, it also at times fell flat and into its own "rejection trap."

Several publications have investigated the book's possible status as an incel novel, while others have used terms like terminally online and brain rot to describe the context of Tulathimutte's work. However, The Cut found that online communities on 4chan and Reddit had mixed reactions to the book.
