= Exception (video game) =

2019 video game

- Developer: Traxmaster Software
- Publisher: Traxmaster Software
- Engine: Unity
- Platforms: Windows; Nintendo Switch; PlayStation 4; Xbox One
- Release: August 13, 2019
- Genre: Platform
- Mode: Single-player

Exception is a 2.5D side-scrolling platform game developed and published by American studio Traxmaster Software. The game was released for Microsoft Windows, Nintendo Switch, Xbox One and PlayStation 4 in Summer 2019. Exception debuted at PAX West in 2017 as part of the Indie Megabooth.

The game is set inside a computer system taken over by viruses in which players control a protagonist attempting to stop these viruses. Gameplay is based in environments which rotate and transform. The title consists of more than 100 levels which include leaderboards which allow players to compete for the fastest times. Exception's soundtrack includes contributions from synthwave musician Waveshaper with eight additional artists.
