= Accept =

Accept often refers to:

- Acceptance, a person's assent to the reality of a situation etc.
- Acceptability, the property of a thing to be able to be accepted

Accept can also refer to:

- Accept (band), a German heavy metal band
  - Accept (Accept album), their debut album from 1979
- Accept (Chicken Shack album), 1970
- ACCEPT (organization), a Romanian LGBT rights organisation
- accept(), a computer programming function provided by the Berkeley sockets API

== See also ==
- Acceptance (disambiguation)
- Receive (disambiguation)
- Rejection (disambiguation)
