= R v Hayes; R v Palombo =

2025 UK Supreme Court decision

- Badge of the Supreme Court
- Court: Supreme Court of the United Kingdom
- Full case name: R v Hayes; R v Palombo
- Decided: 23 July 2025
- Citation: [2025] UKSC 29

Case history
- Prior action: [2024] EWCA Crim 304

Case opinions
- Majority: Lord Reed, Lord Hodge, Lord Lloyd-Jones, Lord Leggatt and Lady Simler

Keywords
- Criminal law, financial regulation, LIBOR

R v Hayes; R v Palombo [2025] UKSC 29 is a decision of the Supreme Court of the United Kingdom concerning the criminal liability of traders convicted of manipulating LIBOR and EURIBOR benchmark interest rates.

== Background ==
Tom Hayes and Carlo Palombo were previously convicted of conspiracy to defraud by conspiring with others to manipulate key benchmark interest rates used in financial markets.

An appeal by Hayes to the Court of Appeal was rejected in 2015 but, following the quashing of similar convictions in the United States, the Criminal Cases Review Commission referred Hayes' and Palombo's convictions back to the Court of Appeal.

That court dismissed the appeals and upheld the conviction but raised the following point of law of general public importance:

"Whether as a matter of law upon the proper construction of the LIBOR and EURIBOR definitions:

(a) If a LIBOR or EURIBOR submission is influenced by trading advantage, it is for that reason not a genuine or honest answer to the question posed by the definitions; and

(b) the submission must be an assessment of the single cheapest rate at which the panel bank, or a prime bank, respectively, could borrow at the time of submission, rather than a selection from within a range of borrowing rates."

== Judgment ==
The Supreme Court unanimously allowed the appeals of Hayes and Palombo, quashing their convictions for conspiracy to defraud. Delivering the judgment of the Court, Lord Leggatt held that the trial judges had misdirected the juries by treating the interpretation of the LIBOR and EURIBOR submission requirements as a matter of law, rather than allowing the juries to determine whether the submissions were false or misleading based on the facts.

The Court found that the Serious Fraud Office’s case rested on an overly rigid and unrealistic interpretation of the benchmark definitions. It rejected the proposition that a submission was dishonest or false merely because it was influenced by the bank's commercial interests. Instead, the Court emphasised that the LIBOR and EURIBOR definitions permitted a range of reasonable estimates, and that the presence of commercial motivation did not automatically render a submission dishonest.

Lord Leggatt observed that the notion of a single “true” rate was illusory, particularly during the financial crisis when inter-bank lending was minimal. He stated that the question of whether a submission was genuine and consistent with the benchmark definition was a matter of fact, properly left to the jury.

The Court concluded that the trial directions had improperly removed this factual question from the jury's consideration, thereby undermining the fairness of the convictions. As a result, both convictions were quashed.

== Reactions ==
Hayes told reporters that he is hoping to recoup the money that was confiscated from him and is taking advice regarding a potential compensation claim.

His solicitor, Karen Todner, called for a public inquiry into the convictions and for reform within the justice system. She suggested that bodies like the Serious Fraud Office should not be allowed to bring prosecutions because they also act as investigators in such cases, drawing a comparison with the British Post Office scandal.

== See also ==
- LIBOR scandal
