= Receiver =

Receiver or receive may refer to:

== Arts, entertainment, and media ==
=== Music ===
==== Albums ====
- Receiver (album), the second and final album of the band Farmer Not So John, released in 1998
- Receivers (album), the fourth full-length release from Parts & Labor, released in 2008 on Jagjaguwar Records

==== Songs ====
- "Receive" (song), a song by Canadian-American recording artist Alanis Morissette
- "Receiver", a song by Wagon Christ
- "Receiver", a song by the American band Bright on the album Bells Break Their Towers

=== Other uses in arts, entertainment, and media ===
- Receiver (statue), a public statue in Green Bay, Wisconsin associated with the Green Bay Packers
- Receiver (video game), a 2012 first-person shooter
- Receiver, a 2024 Netflix streaming television series following NFL wide receivers

== Roles and professions ==
- Receiver, a person who receives goods in a distribution center
- Receiver, in receivership, a person appointed as a custodian of another entity's property by a court of law or a creditor of the owner, pending a lawsuit or bankruptcy
- Metropolitan Police Receiver, formerly the chief financial officer of the London Metropolitan Police
- Receiver of Wreck, an official of the Maritime and Coastguard Agency of the United Kingdom, who is concerned with the management of wrecked ships and boats

== Sports ==
- Receiver, a type of midfielder in Australian rules football
- Wide receiver, an offensive position in American and Canadian football leagues

== Technology ==
- Receiver (firearms), which houses the working parts of the firearm
- Receiver (modulated ultrasound), a device that converts a modulated ultrasonic wave into usable information
- Receiver (radio), an electronic device that converts a signal from a modulated radio wave into usable information
  - Tuner (radio), a subsystem that receives radio frequency (RF) transmissions and converts into a fixed frequency
- Receiver, the listening device part of a telephone
  - The headset (audio) that can also contain the above device
  - The handset that sometimes contains the above device
- AV receiver, part of a home theater system
- Citrix Receiver, a software client application used for virtualization
- Digital media receiver
- Television set, "telly" (UK), is a device that combines a tuner, display, and speakers for the purpose of viewing television
  - Tuner (television), a subsystem that converts radio frequency analog television or digital television transmission into audio and video signals
- Milk receiver, the part of a milking machine setup in which milk is collected: see milking pipeline
- Receiver (information theory), the receiving end of a communications channel

== See also ==
- Receipt
- Receiving (disambiguation)
- Reception (disambiguation)
- Receptor (biochemistry)
