= Exemption =

Exemption may refer to:

- Tax exemption, which allows a certain amount of income or other value to be legally excluded to avoid or reduce taxation
- Exemption (Catholic canon law), an exemption in the Roman Catholic Church, that is the whole or partial release of an ecclesiastical person, corporation, or institution from the authority of the ecclesiastical superior next higher in rank
- Stauropegic exemption, a specific type of ecclesiastical exemption in Eastern Christianity
- Grandfather clause, an exemption that allows a pre-existing condition to continue, even if such a condition is now prohibited from being begun anew
- Exempt employee, is one who is exempt from the Fair Labor Standards Act, i.e. is not entitled to overtime pay and other worker's benefits stated in the FLSA
- Loophole, a weakness or exception that allows a system, such as a law or security, to be circumvented or otherwise avoided
