= List of school attacks in Germany =

The following is a list of school attacks in Germany, including stabbings and shootings that took place in daycare centers, schools, universities and other educational centers.

== List ==
=== German Empire ===
3 incidents.

Date	Location	Perpetrator(s)	Dead	Injured	Total	Description
25 May 1871	Ludwigsgymnasium, in Saarbrücken, Saarland	Julius Becker (18)	0	2	2	An 18-year-old student opened fire at Ludwigsgymnasium, wounding two people.
17 July 1912	Secondary school in Heilbronn, Baden-Württemberg	Unnamed 18-year-old male student	0	1 (the perpetrator)	1	An 18-year-old student, armed with a revolver and a knife, fired shots at his teacher, missing them, before shooting and stabbing himself.
20 June 1913	St-Marien-Schule in Bremen, Free Hanseatic City of Bremen	Heinz Schmidt (29)	5 (4 directly)	21	26	Bremen school shooting: A 29-year-old unemployed teacher, Heinz Schmidt, who was rejected from being employed by the school, opened fire in the school, killing four girls and wounding at least 21 people before being subdued by school staff. A fifth child indirectly died while evacuating.

=== Weimar Republic ===
3 incidents.

Date	Location	Perpetrator(s)	Dead	Injured	Total	Description
December 1928	University of Marburg in Marburg, Hesse	Unnamed perpetrator	0	1	1	A gunman opened fire and wounded a professor at a university in Hesse.
December 1929	Secondary school in Altona, Hamburg, Hamburg	Unnamed student	1	0	1	A student shot and killed a classmate inside a school.
May 1932	Secondary school in Wittlich, Rhineland-Palatinate	Unnamed student	0	0	0	A student fired shots at his teacher, missing him, before being detained.

=== West Germany ===
6 incidents.

Date	Location	Perpetrator(s)	Dead	Injured		Description
11 June 1964	Catholic Elementary School in Cologne	Walter Seifert (42)	11 (including the perpetrator)	22	33	Cologne school massacre: A 41-year-old mentally ill man, Walter Seifert, attacked the people at the school with a home-made flamethrower and a spear, killing eleven people and wounding twenty-two others. When police arrived at the scene, Seifert fled from the school compound, poisoned himself, and died the same evening.
17 July 1964	University of Bonn in Bonn, North Rhine-Westphalia	Unnamed 24-year-old student	2 (including the perpetrator)	0	2	A student killed his 21-year-old classmate at the University of Bonn before killing himself with arsenic.
16 January 1982	Secondary school in Giengen, Baden-Württemberg	Unnamed 19-year-old male student	0	2	2	A student shot and wounded two teachers after receiving low grades.
20 December 1972	University of Erlangen–Nuremberg in Erlangen, Bavaria	Robert Kausler	3 (including the perpetrator)	13	16	Robert Kausler initiated a shooting and arson attack at the University of Erlangen–Nuremberg, killing two people and injuring thirteen others. Kausler died in the fire.
3 June 1983	Freiherr-vom-Stein Gesamtschule in Eppstein	Karel Charva	6 (including the perpetrator)	14	20	Eppstein school shooting: 34-year-old Karel Charva fatally shot three students, a teacher and a police officer and injured another 14 people using two semi-automatic pistols, before committing suicide.
25 January 1984	University of Cologne in Cologne, North Rhine-Westphalia	Sabine S. Gehlhaar	1	1	2	Two teachers were shot by Sabine S. Gehlhaar, resulting in the death of Hermann Greive.

=== Germany ===
27 incidents.

Date	Location	Perpetrator(s)	Dead	Injured	Total	Description
9 November 1999	Franziskaneum Gymnasium in Meissen, Saxony	Andreas S.	1	0	1	A 44-year-old teacher identified as Sigrun L. was stabbed 22 times by 15-year-old Andreas S., who used a knife in the crime. The teacher managed to escape, crawled close to the stairs, but ended up dying. The student was sentenced to seven and a half years in prison.
16 March 2000	Secondary school in Brannenburg, Bavaria	Unnamed 16-year-old male student	1	1 (the perpetrator)	2	The 57-year-old director was shot by a 16-year-old student and later died in hospital. The student attempted suicide by shooting himself and is in a coma in the hospital.
19 February 2002	Landkreis Freising Wirtschaftsschule in Freising, Bavaria; an Eching company	Adam Labus (22)	4 (including the perpetrator)	2	6	Adam Labus, 22 years old, a Polish man who lives in Germany, armed himself with a pistol and homemade bombs, Lubus went to his company where he previously worked in a taxi and shot two employees, the manager died at the scene and the foreman succumbed to his injuries later. Labus took the taxi again to go to a business school, where he killed the director and shot a teacher, before shooting himself in the head and dying.
26 April 2002	Gutenberg-Gymnasium in Erfurt, Thuringia	Robert Steinhäuser (19)	17 (including the perpetrator)	1	17	Erfurt school massacre: 19-year-old expelled student Robert Steinhäuser shot and killed 16 people, including a police officer before killing himself.
2 July 2003	Coburger Realschule 2 in Coburg, Bavaria	Florian K. (16)	1 (the perpetrator)	1	2	Coburg shooting: 16-year-old Florian K. fired a handgun during a lesson in an attempt to kill his teacher. A second intervening teacher was lightly injured after being shot in the thigh before the shooter killed himself.
20 November 2006	Geschwister-Scholl-Schule in Emsdetten, North Rhine-Westphalia	Sebastian Bosse (18)	1 (the perpetrator)	37	38	2006 Emsdetten school shooting: Former student Sebastian Bosse shot and wounded 8 people and set off several smoke bombs before committing suicide. A teacher was injured when a smoke bomb hit her face. 28 others were injured as a result of smoke inhalation.
6 July 2007	Schüler der Kuseler Berufsschule in Kusel, Rhineland-Palatinate	Michael B. (24)	1 (the perpetrator)	1	2	Michael B., a 24-year-old man suffering from cancer, met at the bus stop with his ex-girlfriend, a 16-year-old student who didn't want to talk to him and ran away to school. Michael chased the student and shot her in the thigh while she was at the entrance to the institution. The teachers who realized what happened chased Michael and, when Michael realized this, he shot himself in the head with his pistol and died in the hospital.
11 March 2009	Albertville-Realschule in Winnenden, Baden-Württemberg	Tim Kretschmer (17)	16 (including the perpetrator)	7	25	2009 Winnenden shootings: A former student opened fire in the school and fled in a stolen car. He killed 2 and injured 2 more at a car dealership and killed himself after a shootout with police.
11 May 2009	Albert Einstein Gymnasium in Sankt Augustin, North Rhine-Westphalia	Tanja O. (16)	0	1	1	A 16-year-oñd student at the Albert Einstein gymnasium, armed with a tear gas pistol, flamethrower, Molotov cocktails and five kilos of gunpowder, slashed a classmate. O. escaped from school and went home, where she was later detained.
17 September 2009	Gymnasium Carolinum in Ansbach, Bavaria	Georg Riess (18)	0	16 (including the perpetrator)	16	Ansbach school attack: A school student attacked the school, armed with knives, Molotov cocktails, and an axe, he injured 15 before being shot and arrested by police.
18 February 2010	Berufsbildende Schule Technik 2 (BBS Technik 2) in Ludwigshafen, Rhineland-Palatinate	Rudolf S. (58)	1	0	1	A 23 year old former student (Florian K.) entered Berufsbildende Schule - Technik 2,armed with a Combat knife and a Gas pistolstabbing and killing a 58 year old teacher over bad grades. The attacker made threats to other staff but was quickly arrested by SEK (Germany) inside the School. The attack left one person dead but noone else injured.
9 November 2011	Wolterstorff-Gymnasium in Ballenstedt, Saxony-Anhalt	Unnamed 13-year-old female student	0	0	0	A 13-year-old girl set two fires in a school restroom before threatening a student outside with a knife. The attacker was arrested outside. No injuries occurred.
26 February 2013	Hauptmann-Gymnasium in Wernigerode, Saxony-Anhalt	Unnamed 15-year-old male student	0	2	2	A 15-year-old student shot two classmates in the neck and face with a blank gun before being restrained.
24 January 2022	University of Heidelberg in Heidelberg, Baden-Württemberg	Nikolai G. (18)	2 (including the perpetrator)	3	5	Heidelberg University shooting: Nikolai G., an 18-year-old student at Heidelberg University, fired shotgun blasts into the freshmen's hall, where there were 30 students participating in chemistry classes. Four people were hit, one woman died in hospital and the other three were injured and survived. Nikolai G. killed himself after the shots.
19 May 2022	Lloyd-Gymnasium in Bremerhaven, Bremen	Berkan S. (21)	0	1	1	A teacher was seriously injured by 21-year-old former student Berkan S., who used a crossbow, two knives and two bladed weapons in the attack. The perpetrator then ran outside, fired several more bolts, and then laid down on the floor as police arrived. He was arrested and later sentenced to 8 years' imprisonment with psychiatric care for attempted murder. During his trial, he was diagnosed with depression and a psychiatric disorder, and had reportedly been hoping responding police would shoot him dead.
10 June 2022	Hochschule Hamm-Lippstadt (HSHL) in Hamm, North Rhine-Westphalia	Unnamed 34-year-old man	1	3	4	An unidentified 34-year-old man attacked a teacher and three students with a knife on the school campus, one teacher died days after the attack, and the other victims recovered. The man was arrested and later convicted.
3 May 2023	Evangelische Schule Neukölln in Berlin	Unnamed 38-year-old man	0	2	2	A 38-year-old man broke into the school courtyard and stabbed two students aged 7 and 8, causing minor injuries to the two victims and the suspect was arrested.
24 May 2023	Vocational school in Wildeshausen, Lower Saxony	Unnamed 17-year-old male student	0	1	1	A 17-year-old student stabbed another 16-year-old student in the institution's bathroom, the student was rescued and is doing well. The student was detained after the attack.
23 August 2023	Primary school in Bischofswerda, Saxony	Unnamed 16-year-old male student	0	2 (including the perpetrator)	2	A 16-year-old former student at a primary school surprised an 8-year-old student, stabbing him and seriously injuring him. Before that, the former student set himself on fire and was rescued and taken to the hospital, where he remained in a coma.
9 November 2023	Secondary school in Offenburg, Baden-Württemberg	Mateja Z. (15)	1	0	1	Mateja Z., a 15-year-old student, shot twice at a classmate of the same age who died in the hospital. The student was talked into dropping the weapon by an adult, upon arrival of the authorities he was arrested.
22 February 2024	Wilhelm Dörpfeld Gymnasium in Wuppertal, North Rhine-Westphalia	Unnamed 17-year-old male student	0	4 (including the perpetrator)	4	A 17-year-old student stabbed three other students during a break in lessons, before severely injuring himself also.
19 July 2024	Secondary school in Wedel, Schleswig-Holstein	Unnamed perpetrators	0	1	6	Four people have been arrested on suspicion of stabbing and seriously injuring a 67-year-old music teacher.
2 December 2024	Georg-Zacharias-Grundschule in Berlin	Unnamed man	0	44	44	A man sprayed animal repellent at children at a Berlin school, injuring 44 students, one of them seriously.
7 January 2025	Unamed school bus	Unnamed 14-year-old male student	0	1	1	An undentified 13-year old stabbed a 14-year old as he was entering a school bus. The attack happened around 07:00 AM at a bus stop on Rothenburger Straße in Schnelldorf, as students waited for their school bus.
5 September 2025·	Bildungspark vocational college in Essen, North Rhine-Westphalia	Erjon S. (17)	0	2 (1 outside the school)	2	Erjon S., a 17-year-old Kosovar citizen, stabbed a man on a bus, then attacked a teacher and injured them at a vocational college. The student was confronted by police in a park and arrested after being shot.
8 October 2025	Westfalenkolleg in Paderborn, North Rhine-Westphalia	Unnamed 25-year-old man	0	1	1	A 25-year-old man stabbed a woman at a vocational school.
8 July 2026	Welfen-Gymnasium in Schongau, Bavaria	Unnamed 16-year-old student	0	2	2	A self-identified incel, armed with a knife and gun stabbed two girls at a school before being apprehended.
27 August 2026	Docemus Privatschulen – Campus Neu Zittau in Gosen-Neu Zittau, Brandenburg	Unnamed 19-year-old man	2	0	2	2026 Gosen-Neu Zittau school stabbing: A man entered at around 1:45 p.m. the schoolyard of the private school and killed his 18-year-old ex-girlfriend and a 30-year-old school staff member with a knife. The suspect was arrested by police.

== See also ==
- List of mass shootings in Germany
- List of mass stabbings in Germany
