= Eppstein school shooting =

1983 school shooting in West Germany

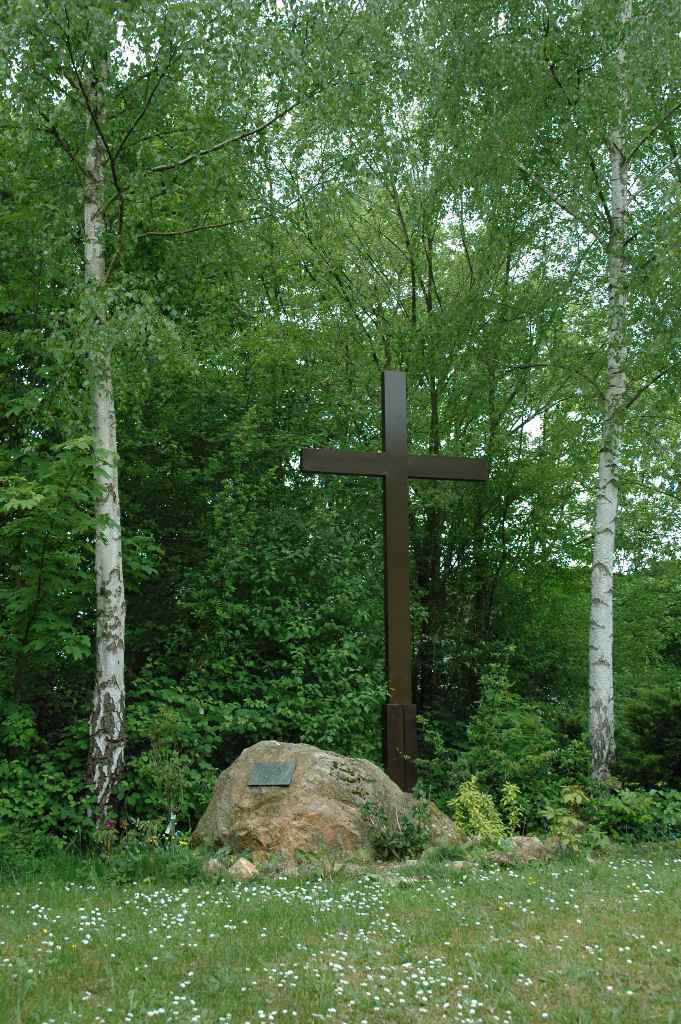
- Memorial for the victims of the shooting
- Location: Eppstein-Vockenhausen, Hesse, West Germany
- Date: 3 June 1983; 10:45 a.m. - 11:15 a.m. (CET; UTC+01:00)
- Attack type: School shooting, mass murder, murder-suicide
- Weapons: 9x19 Smith & Wesson Model 59 semi-automatic pistol; Astra pistol (7.65mm)
- Deaths: 6 (including the perpetrator)
- Injuries: 14
- Perpetrator: Karel Charva
- Motive: Unknown, possibly frustration for failing to qualify as a teacher

On 3 June 1983, a school shooting occurred at the Freiherr-vom-Stein Gesamtschule in Eppstein-Vockenhausen, Hesse, Germany. The gunman, 34-year-old Karel Charva, fatally shot three students, a teacher and a police officer and injured another 14 people using two semi-automatic pistols, before committing suicide.

== Shooting ==
At about 7:20 a.m. Charva rented a VW panel van at a car rental agency in Frankfurt am Main and is supposed to have driven through the area in search for a school that gave lessons that day, as many were closed due to a holiday. Thus, it is assumed, it was pure chance that he ended up at the Freiherr-vom-Stein Gesamtschule in Eppstein, about 30 kilometers from Frankfurt.

Charva parked his car near the school, leaving 160 rounds of ammunition, a bag and handcuffs behind. He then entered the building with two semi-automatic pistols, a 9×19mm Smith & Wesson Model 59 and a 7.65mm-caliber Astra pistol, as well as seven additional magazines.

At about 10:45 a.m. he arrived at room 213, where Franz-Adolf Gehlhaar taught English to a sixth grade class. Charva fired a shot at Gehlhaar, missing him, and immediately retreated out of the classroom, only to re-enter. When Gehlhaar confronted the gunman, he told him not to shoot the children, but take him instead. He fired seven shots at the teacher, hitting him in the stomach, face and left arm. As soon as Gehlhaar lay on the floor gravely wounded, Charva began shooting the children, killing three of them and wounding another thirteen, four of them critically. Alarmed by the gunshots, teacher Hans-Peter Schmitt rushed into the classroom, trying to help, but was also shot and killed, as was Gisbert Beck, an unarmed police officer who was at the school instructing students on traffic safety.

When police arrived at the scene they tried to calm Charva down, but the gunman simply yelled at them and continued shooting. At about 11:15 a.m. Charva retreated into a classroom opposite the English class where the attack began and committed suicide by shooting himself in the mouth. The autopsy of his body later showed that he had acted under the influence of alcohol.

In all Charva had fired about forty shots, killed 5 people and injured another 14. Additionally, 30 children suffered from shock.

Initially, there was some confusion that Charva might have known the wounded teacher, as shortly before the shooting started someone had asked for Gehlhaar, though it was later found that the person was not the gunman.

== Victims ==
The five fatalities were:

- Stephanie Hermann, 12
- Javier Martinez, 11
- Gabriele Siebert, 12
- Hans-Peter Schmitt, 36, teacher
- Gisbert Beck, 45, police officer

== Perpetrator ==
Karel Charva

Karel Charva, a native from Prague, Czechoslovakia and follower of Alexander Dubček, fled to West Germany in 1968 when the Soviet-led intervention ended the Prague Spring. After living in a camp at Zirndorf for a while he was finally granted the status of a political refugee in 1971. Stating he was a psychologist and wanting to become a teacher, Charva moved to Mörfelden-Walldorf and later to Darmstadt, where he began working as a taxi driver for a Frankfurt cab company. In 1976 he was arrested and convicted for loosening the nuts on the front wheels of two cars. Though the motives behind this deed are unknown, it was suggested that it might have been politically motivated.

Living in Frankfurt since 1981, where he found a job as security guard, Charva was known by his neighbours as a loner and very reserved person, who spent whole nights typing on his typewriter and studying chemistry and mathematics, apparently to become a teacher. He was also a member of a local gun club and legally purchased the two weapons used in the shooting in 1981. In the last weeks of his life he was described as increasingly aggressive.

The motive behind Charva's shooting remains unknown, though it was speculated by the Hamburger Abendblatt newspaper that pent-up anger and frustration about failing to bring his aspiring attempts to qualify as a teacher to fruition could have been a cause.

== See also ==
- Ansbach school attack
- Emsdetten school shooting
- List of rampage killers (school massacres)
- List of school attacks in Germany
