= Emsdetten =

- Town
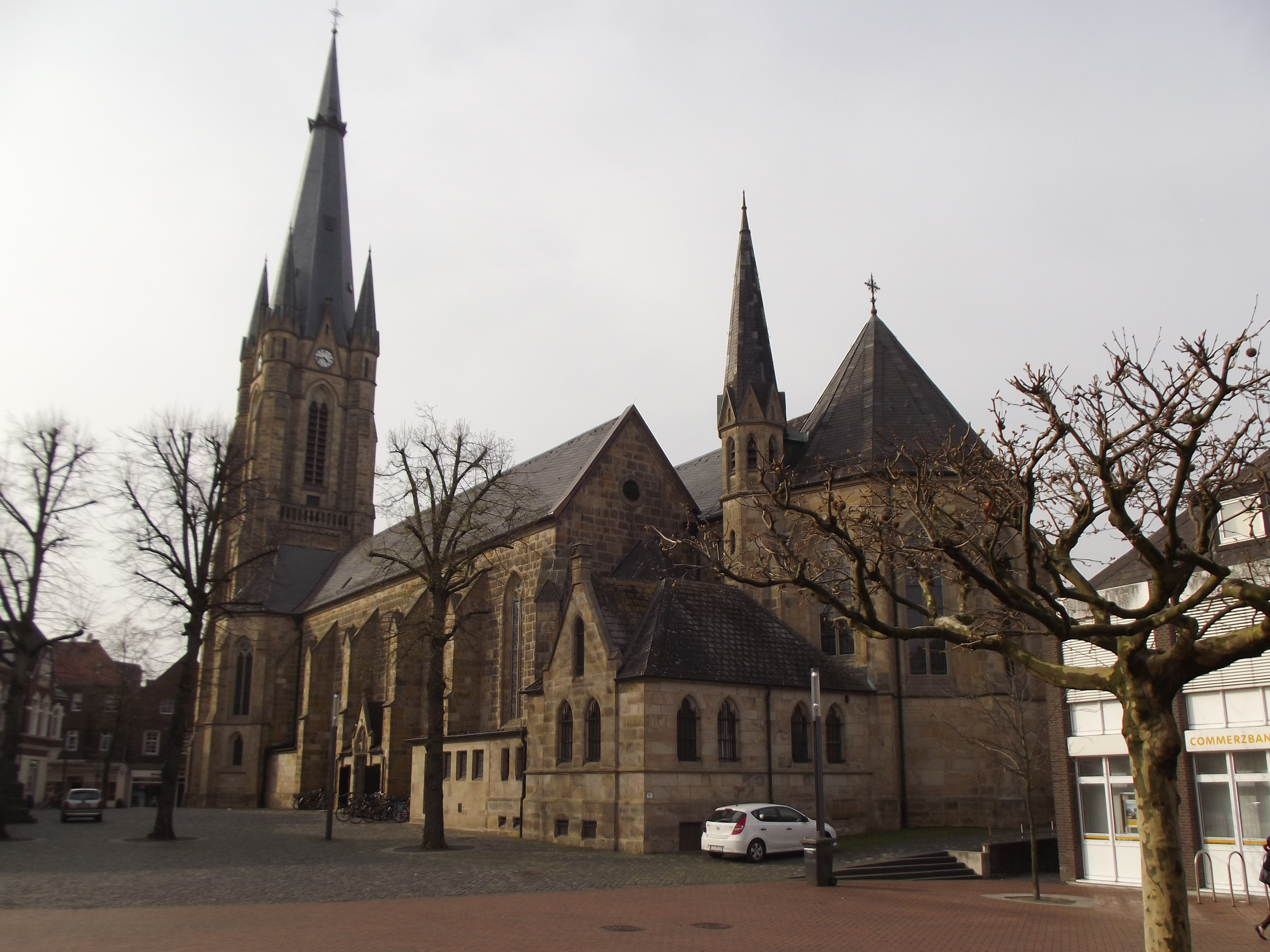
- Catholic church

- Coat of arms

- Location of Emsdetten within Steinfurt district
- Interactive map of Emsdetten
- Location within Germany Location within North Rhine-Westphalia
- Coordinates: 52°10′22″N 7°32′4″E
- Country: Germany
- State: North Rhine-Westphalia
- Admin. region: Münster
- District: Steinfurt

Government
  - Mayor (2020–25): Oliver Kellner (Greens)

Area
  - Total: 72.06 km^{2} (27.82 sq mi)
- Elevation: 45 m (148 ft)

Population (2025-12-31)
  - Total: 35,925
  - Density: 498.5/km^{2} (1,291/sq mi)
- Time zone: UTC+01:00 (CET)
  - Summer (DST): UTC+02:00 (CEST)
- Postal codes: 48282
- Dialling codes: 02572
- Vehicle registration: ST, BF, TE
- Website: www.emsdetten.de

Emsdetten (German pronunciation: [ɛmsˈdɛtn̩]; Westphalian: Detten) is a town in the district of Steinfurt, in North Rhine-Westphalia, Germany.

== Geography ==
Emsdetten is situated on the river Ems, approx. 13 kilometres (8 miles) south-east of Rheine and 25 km (16 mi) north-west of Münster.

=== Neighbouring places ===
- Rheine
- Hörstel
- Saerbeck
- Greven
- Nordwalde
- Steinfurt
- Neuenkirchen

=== Division of the town ===
Emsdetten consists of 8 districts:

- Emsdetten
- Ahlintel
- Austum
- Hembergen
- Hollingen
- Isendorf
- Sinningen
- Westum

== Population ==
Historical population

Year	Pop.	±% p.a.
1965	28,435	—
1970	30,040	+1.10%
1975	30,192	+0.10%
1980	31,027	+0.55%
1985	31,073	+0.03%
1990	31,930	+0.55%
1995	33,665	+1.06%

Year	Pop.	±% p.a.
2000	35,230	+0.91%
2005	35,499	+0.15%
2010	35,523	+0.01%
2015	36,320	+0.44%
2020	36,068	−0.14%
2025	35,925	−0.08%

Source: Landesdatabank Nordrhein-Westfalen

== 2006 school shooting ==
On 20 November 2006, 18-year-old former student Bastian Bosse entered the Geschwister Scholl School, fired several shots and set off smoke grenades. He injured 22 people before killing himself by a shot into the mouth. Even though there were no other fatalities, the shooting was considered the deadliest school shooting in the history of Germany since the Erfurt massacre; this position is now held by the Winnenden school shooting.

== Twin towns – sister cities ==
Emsdetten is twinned with:

- Chojnice, Poland
- Hengelo, Netherlands

== Notable people ==
- Walt Tkaczuk (born 1947), ice hockey player, first German born player in the National Hockey League
- Kathrin Vogler (born 1963), politician, MdB
- Atze Schröder (born 1965), comedian
- Norbert Krüler (born 1957), musician
- Valerie Niehaus (born 1974), actress
- Christina Schulze Föcking (born 1976), politician, MdL NRW
- Tim Wieskötter (born 1979), sprint canoeist, Olympic winner
- Lutz Altepost (born 1981), sprint canoeist, Olympic medalist and world champion
- Benjamin Behrla (born 1985), judoka
- Sebastian Sebastian Bosse (29 April 1988 – 20 November 2006) Perpetrator of the Emsdetten school shooting

== Gallery ==
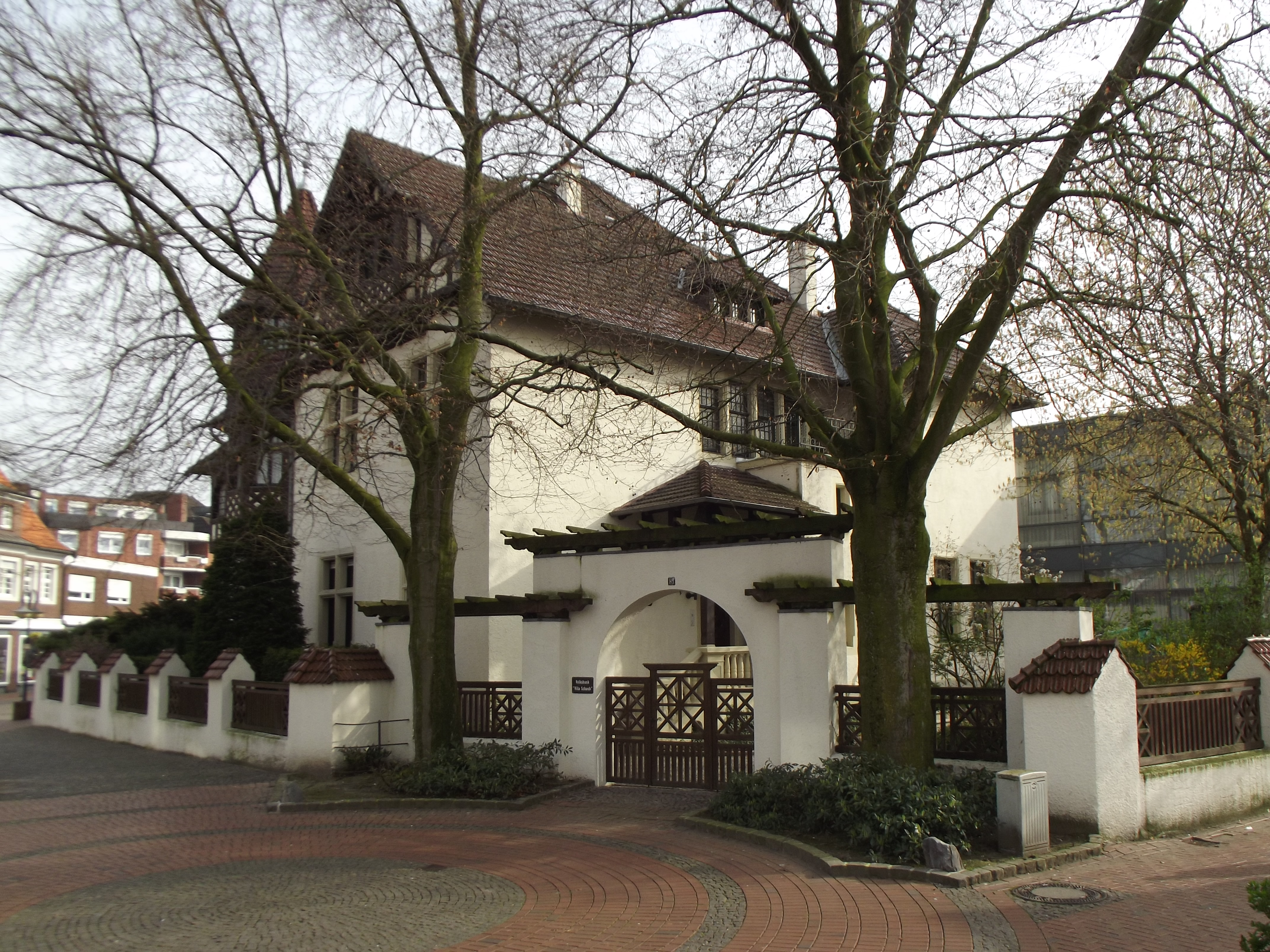
Villa Schaub

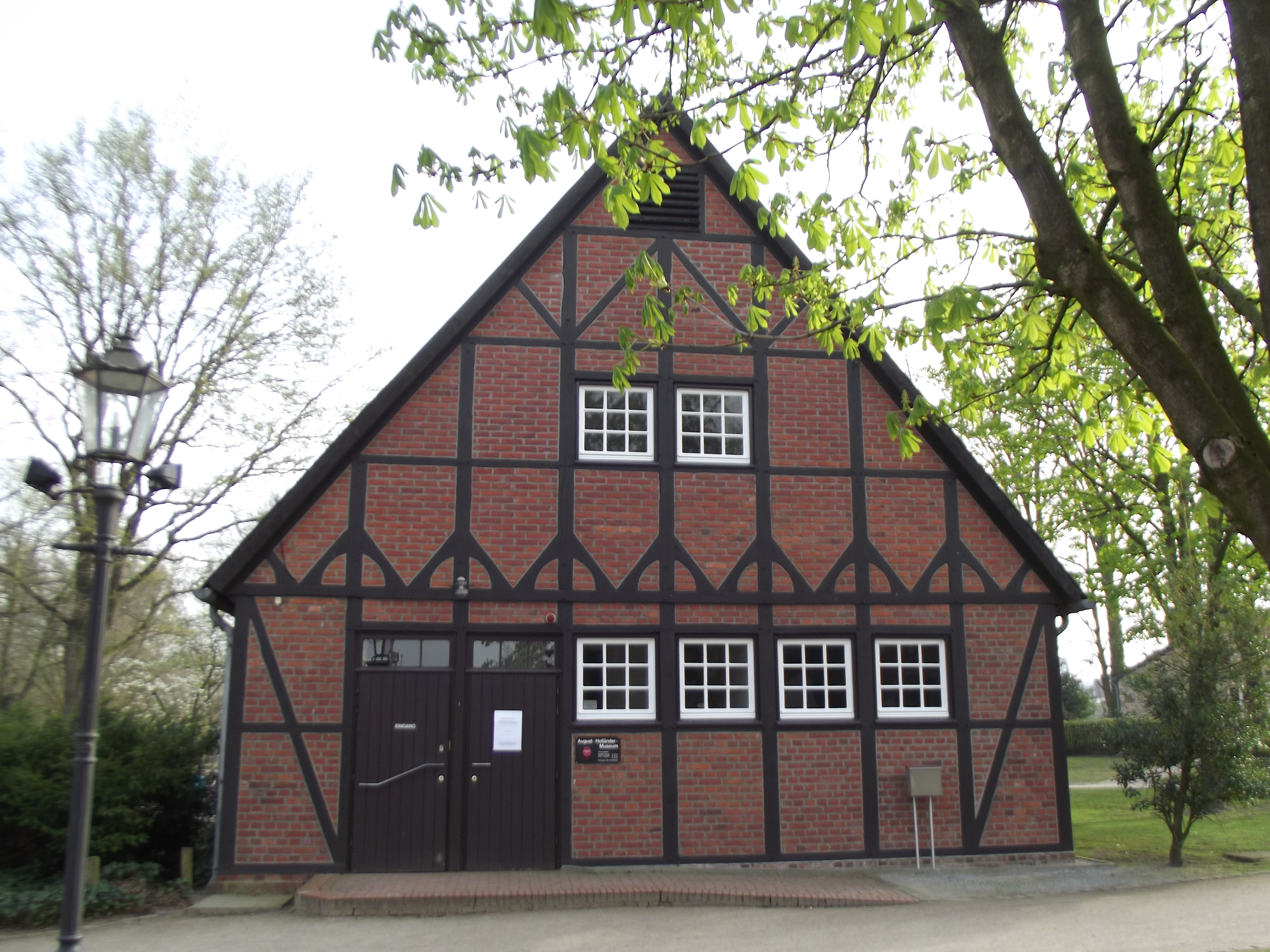
August Holländer Museum

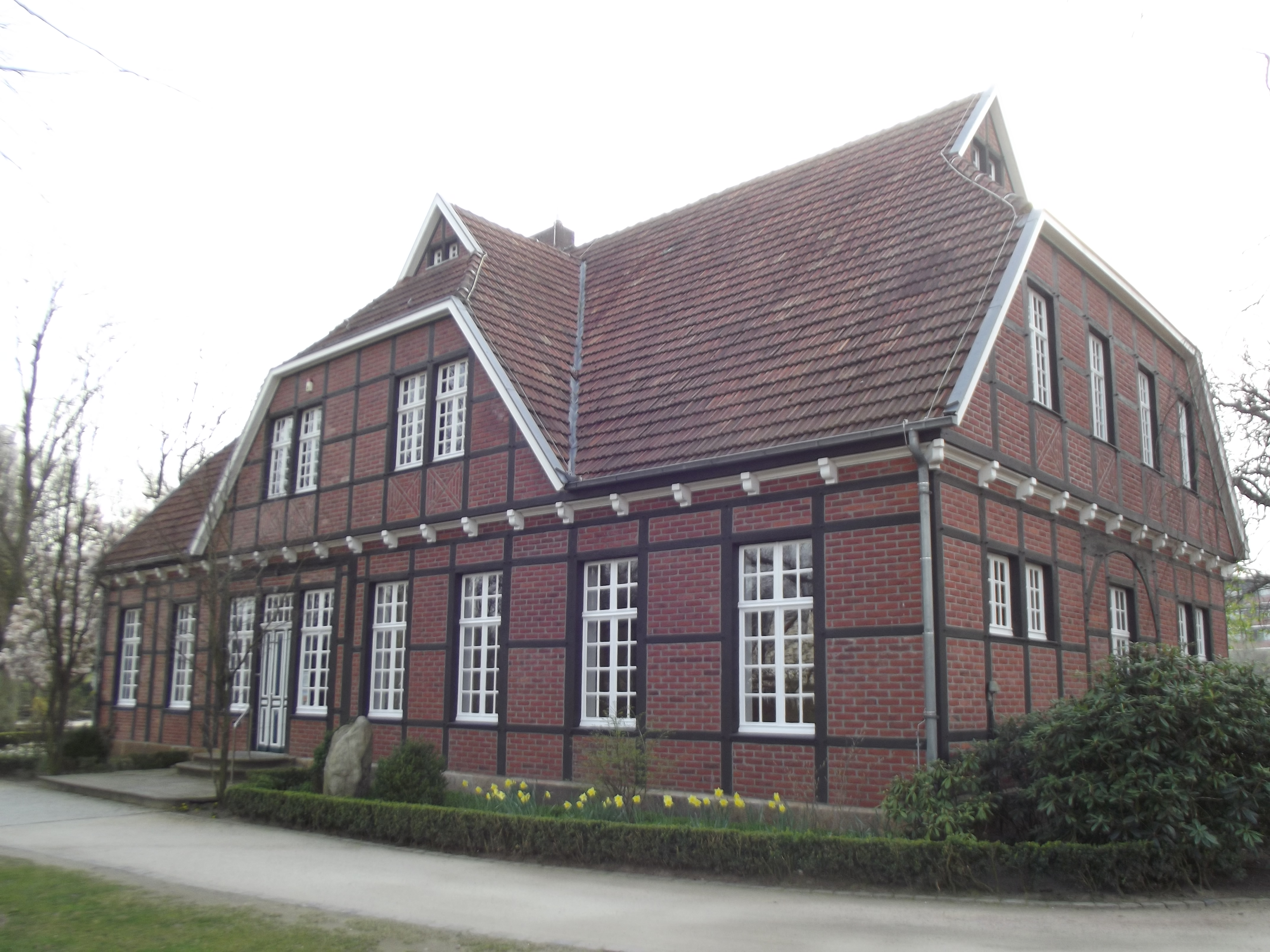
The Town Museum

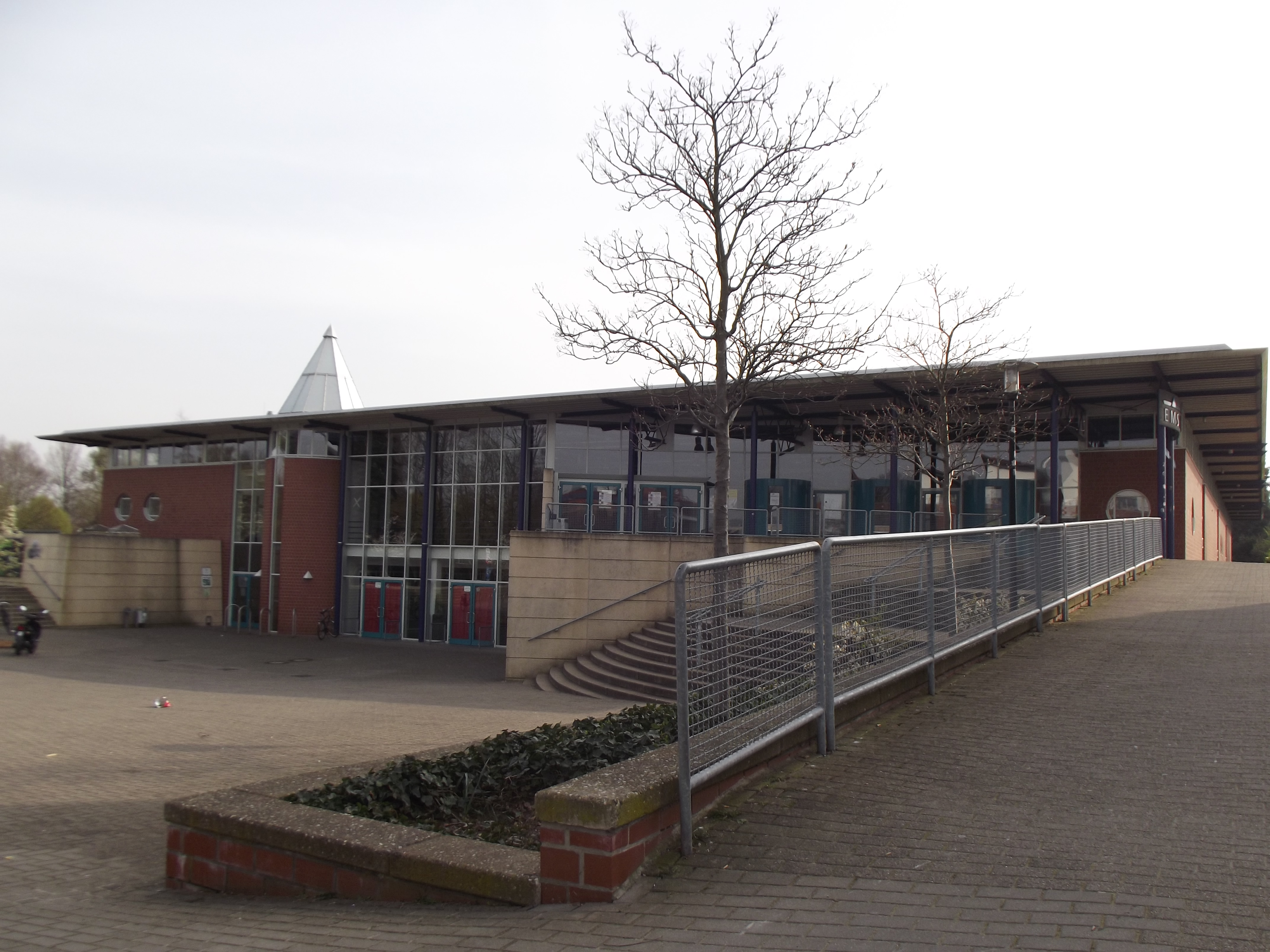
The concert hall (Emslandhalle)

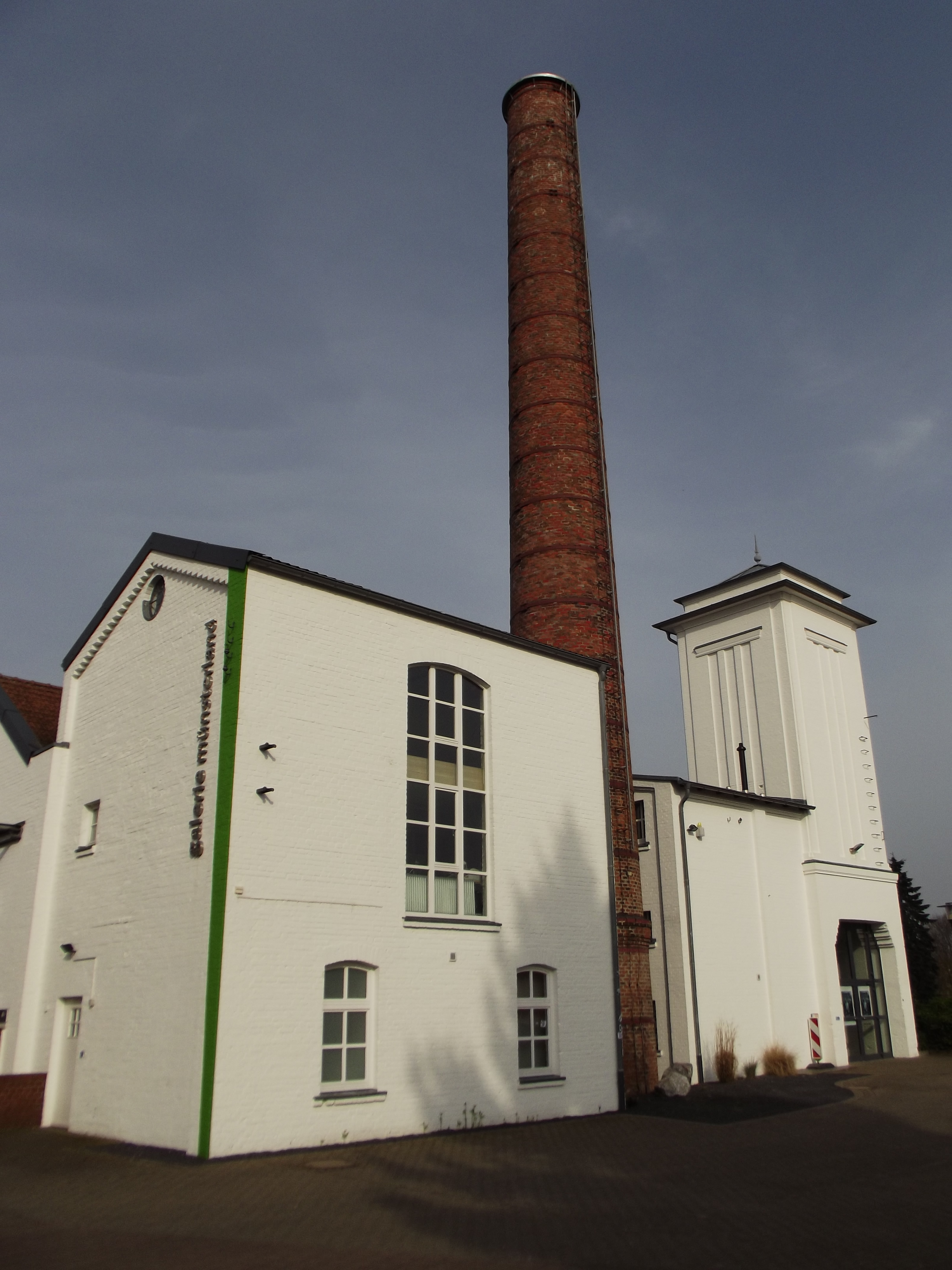
The art gallery

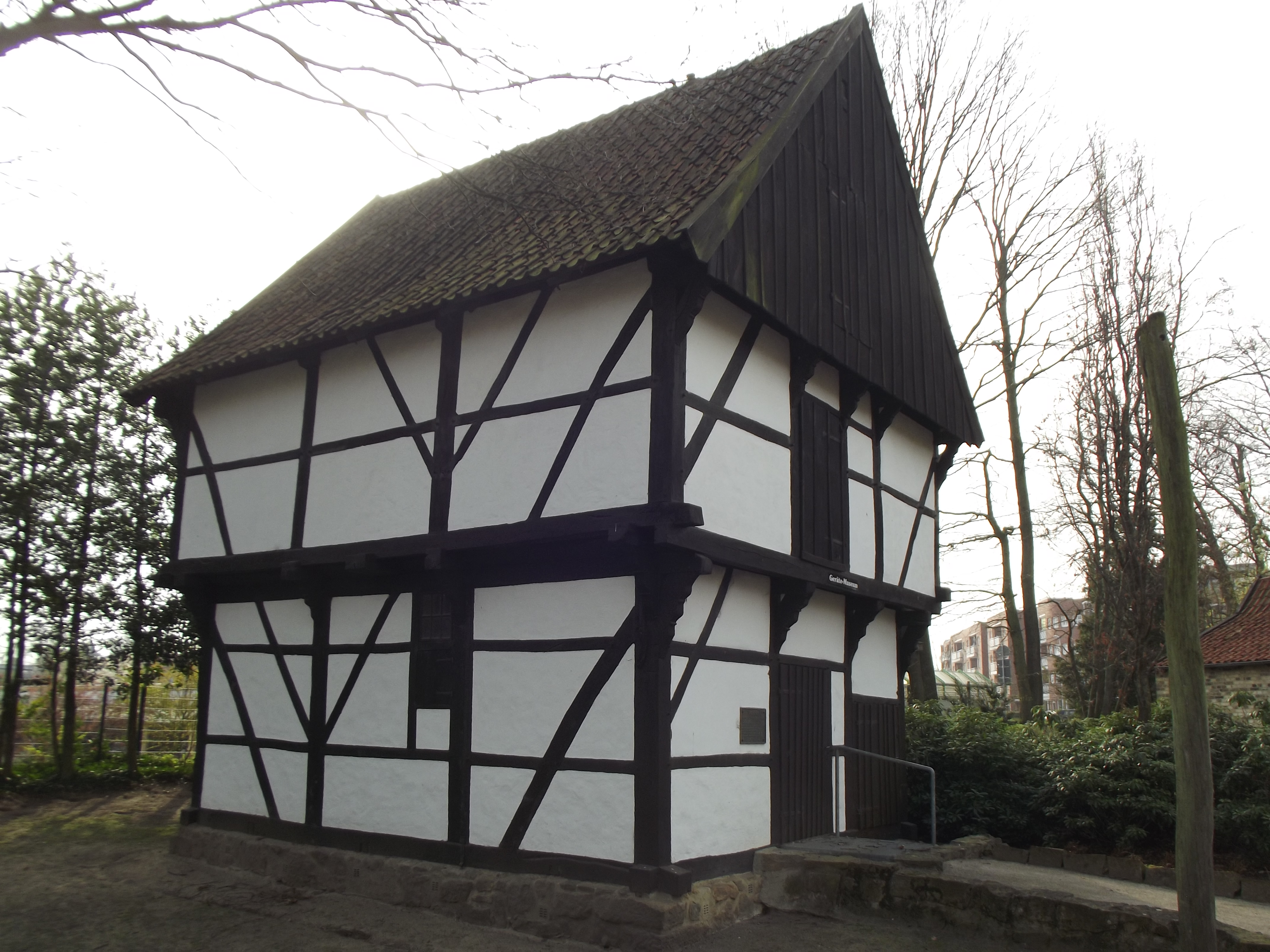
A museum dedicated to tools

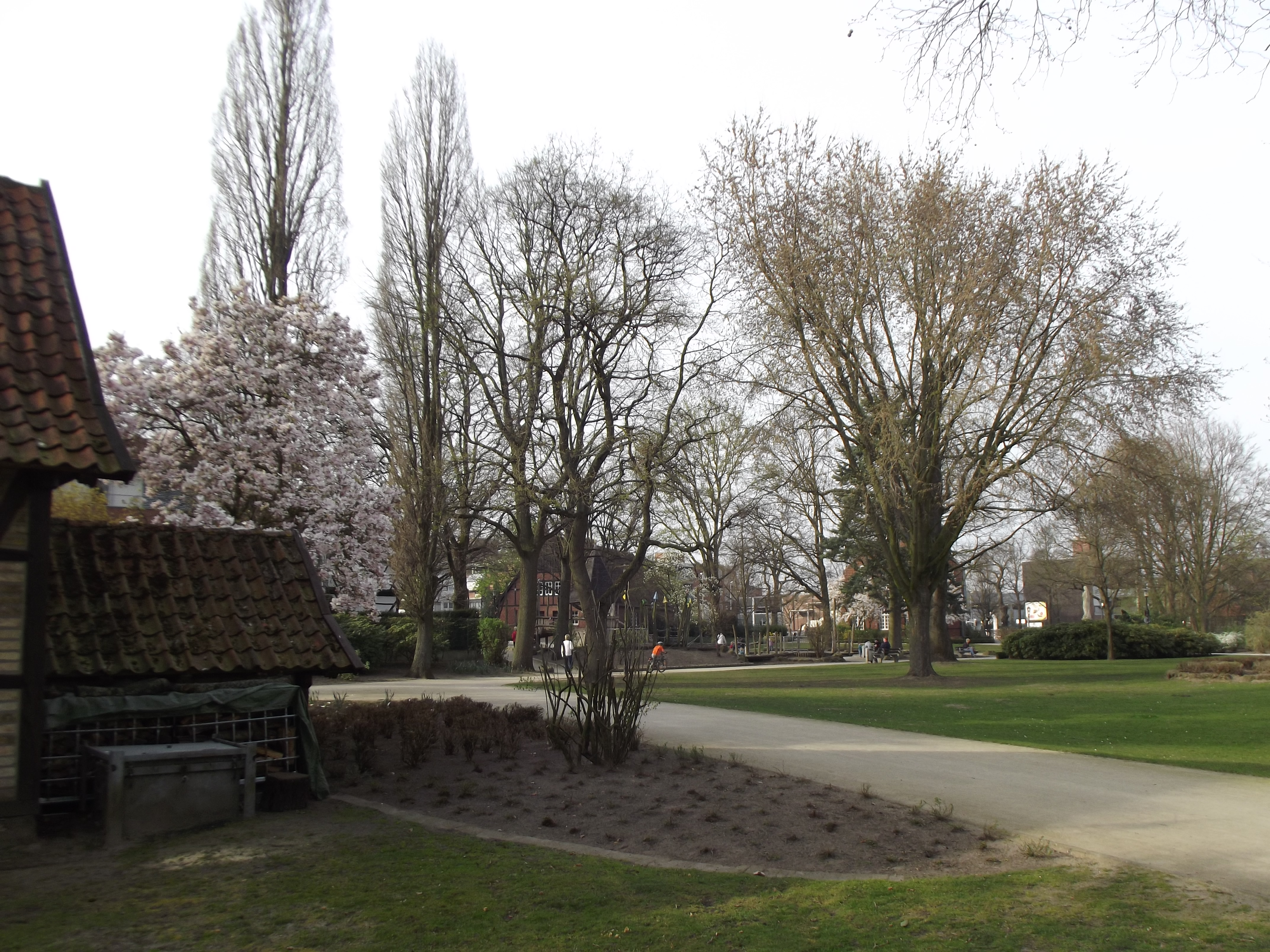
Emsdetten's Urban Park
