= Gymnasium Carolinum =

Gymnasium Carolinum may refer to:

- Gymnasium Carolinum (Ansbach)
- Gymnasium Carolinum (Osnabrück)
