= Ansbach school attack =

2009 attack in Bavaria, Germany

- Location: 49°18′4″N 10°34′11″E; Ansbach, Germany
- Date: 17 September 2009; 08:30–08:46 (UTC+1)
- Target: Gymnasium Carolinum
- Weapons: Molotov cocktails, axe, knives
- Deaths: 0
- Injuries: 16 (including the perpetrator)
- Perpetrator: Georg Riess

The Ansbach school attack occurred on 17 September 2009 at the Gymnasium Carolinum, a secondary school in Ansbach, a town of some 40,000 inhabitants in Bavaria, Germany. The attacker, 18-year-old Georg Riess, was armed with Molotov cocktails and an axe. Fifteen people were injured in the attack, two of them severely. The attacker was also injured. Police arrived on the scene shortly after the attack began, shot the attacker, and took him into custody.

== Attack details ==
The attacker entered the school building around 08:30 (UTC+1), armed with an axe, two knives and three Molotov cocktails. He hurled one of the incendiary devices into an eleventh-grade classroom, attacked a fleeing student with the axe, then threw another Molotov cocktail into a ninth-grade classroom across the hall. The student who had been attacked with an axe sustained a life-threatening concussion, another student incurred severe burns, and eleven other students as well as two teachers were lightly injured. At 08:35, an 18-year-old student notified the police, who arrived a short time later. The 18-year-old, who had been active for several years in the volunteer fire department, then began working to extinguish the fire. At this point, the attacker had locked himself in a bathroom stall. As he left the stall, he threatened the police officers with a knife. The police opened fire at 08:43, severely injuring the attacker with three shots to his arm, abdomen, and chest.

== Background ==
The attacker, Georg Riess, was 18 years old at the time of the attack and was himself a student at Carolinum. He had been undergoing psychotherapy for some time prior. He had been planning the attack intensively for months and had prepared a will. He had a date picked for the attack since the beginning of June 2009, but due to last-minute technical difficulties in preparing the Molotov cocktails he postponed the attack by a day.

The police investigation later revealed that the attacker had felt unfairly treated, excluded, and unrespected; that he had been worried about passing the Abitur (university entrance exam); and that he had wished he had a girlfriend. He did not want to live anymore and had planned to be killed in the attack, and he had wanted to kill as many students and teachers as possible at the same time.

No violent computer games, violent videos, or firearms were found at the attacker's home. While after previous attacks the public debate revolved mainly around changes to gun laws or laws for the protection of youth, the debate following this attack was confined to the problem of school bullying.

== Aftermath ==
In reaction to the attack, the police union advocated the introduction of an early warning system for schools. Several state governments expressed a desire to increase the number of school psychologists. The German Association of Cities and Towns, in view of the attack as well as the recent death of Dominik Brunner, came out in favor of an advisory council on youth violence, based on the model of the German Immigration Council, which works in cooperation with the Federal Office for Migration and Refugees. This advisory council on youth violence would develop plans for initiatives such as using the Internet for antiviolence training and increasing security in public spaces. In addition, local authorities supported greater integration among education, judicial, and youth welfare departments, as well as a safety partnership between police, municipalities, schools, and sports associations.

The 18-year-old who had placed the emergency call was nominated by a classmate for the XY Prize for Civil Courage.

== Trial ==
The Ansbach prosecutor's office charged the suspect, who was 19 years old at the time the trial began, with 47 counts of attempted murder, two counts of attempted manslaughter, 13 counts of grievous bodily harm, as well as attempted first-degree arson. The Ansbach District Court commenced the trial on 22 April 2010. After the charges were read, the trial was closed to the public until the pronouncement of the verdict. On 29 April 2010, Riess was found guilty of all 47 counts of attempted murder, among other charges, and sentenced to nine years of juvenile detention. The juvenile-crime chamber of the Ansbach District Court further ordered his indefinite commitment to a psychiatric clinic.

In August 2025, Riess escaped the psychiatric clinic he was held in and fled to South America, eventually settling in Bucaramanga. He was arrested in early September 2025 in Piedecuesta after Interpol notified the authorities Riess was present in the area.

== See also ==
- List of school attacks in Germany
- 2016 Ansbach bombing
- Cologne school massacre
- Emsdetten school shooting
- Erfurt massacre
- List of school-related attacks
- Winnenden school shooting
