= Coburg shooting =

2003 failed school attack

Coordinates: 50.2627°N 10.9472°E

- Location: Coburg, Bavaria, Germany
- Date: 2 July 2003 c. 9:00 a.m.
- Target: Sabine G.
- Attack type: School shooting; Attempted murder-suicide
- Weapons: Walther PPK pistol Colt Python revolver (suicide)
- Deaths: 1 (the perpetrator)
- Injuries: 1
- Perpetrator: Florian K.
- Motive: Unknown

On 2 July 2003, a school shooting took place at Realschule II in Coburg, Bavaria, Germany. A faculty member was injured before the perpetrator killed himself.

== Background ==
The shooting occurrred in the aftermath of two high-profile mass shootings in 2002, the Freising shooting with three deaths, and the Erfurt school shooting, with sixteen deaths.

== Incident ==
During a German lesson during second period of class 8a, a student pulled out a Walther PPK and fired a single shot at 41-year-old teacher Sabine G., which missed and struck the blackboard behind the woman. While Sabine G. and most of the other students fled the room through the door, a 15-year-old boy was forced to stay by the shooter at gunpoint. Shortly after, 52-year-old teacher and school psychologist Gabriela O., having heard the noise, entered the classroom to investigate and upon encountering the shooter, she attempted to disarm him. Gabriela O. was shot in the thigh during the struggle. Police believe that this gunshot was fired accidentally. The shooter then retrieved a second handgun, a Colt Python, and fatally shot himself in the mouth. Both Sabine G. and the student taken hostage were unharmed.

== Perpetrator ==
The shooter was identified as 16-year-old Florian K. in accordance with German privacy laws. He had taken the guns used in the shooting from his father's gun safe, who was a shooting club member. It was reported that Florian K. had already shown off one of the guns in a biology lesson during the first period to fellow students, giving away some of the ammunition as souvenirs.

Florian K. was held back twice, but not previously noted for aggressive behaviour. It was noted that his academic performance had dropped recently, which led to a meeting between the school and his parents in May, but he was still expected to pass the grade.

== Investigation ==
Coburg Realschule II principal Paul Aschenbrenner stated that he did not believe that the shooting was a planned school killing, instead speculating that Florian K. had fired the gun only to shock his class, but that the situation escalated when he realized the criminal ramifications. However, police later found that Florian K. had told two schoolmates some days earlier that he planned to kill his teacher Sabine G. and on the morning of the shooting, he had made a vague reference that "something could happen in German class".

Media focused on the fact that Florian K. was a fan of the black metal band Dark Funeral and had an interest in Satanism. He often wore a pentagram, was known to own a copy of the Satanic Bible and regularly snuck into the local cemetery with his girlfriend, sometimes role-playing as vampires or lighting candles in mimicry of Black Mass. Police denied that Satanism was a motive in the shooting. It was noted that he was previously interest in hip-hop before participating in the goth subculture, beginning around 18 months before the shooting, apparently to overcome his fear of death. It is believed by investigators that Florian K. wrongly believed that he would fail his classes again and blamed teacher Sabine G. for this. The prosecutor's office acknowledged that his interest in Satanism may have been a contributing factor in the plans to kill G.

== Aftermath ==
The affected class 8a was provided with psychological counselling. Florian K. was buried on 5 July. His father was investigated for failing to properly lock away his weapons, while the two classmates who were told of the plans were investigated for obstruction of justice.
