= Cologne school massacre =

1964 mass murder at an elementary school in Cologne, West Germany

Coordinates: 51°01′00″N 6°53′26″E

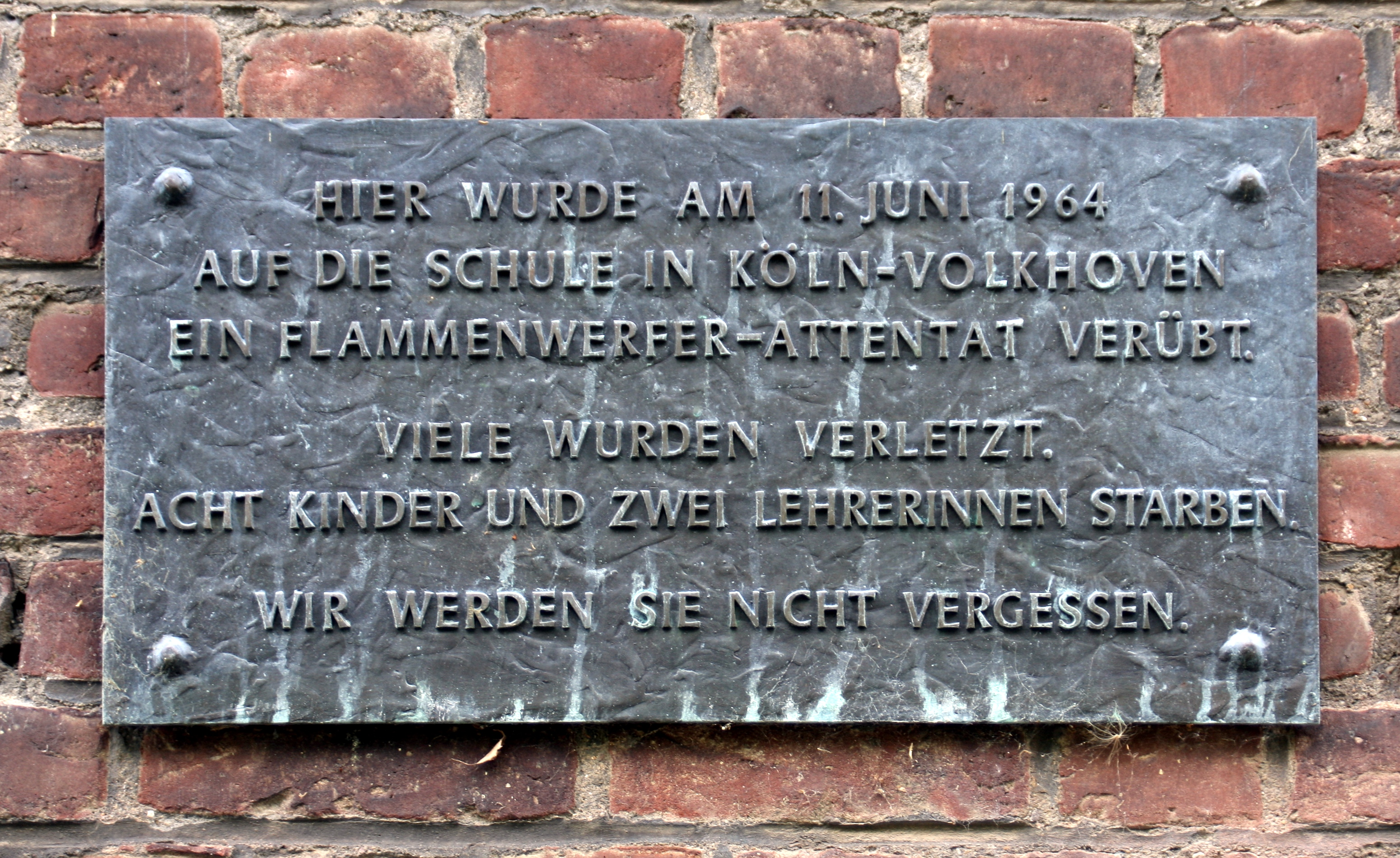
- Commemorative plaque
- Location: Cologne, North Rhine-Westphalia, West Germany
- Date: 11 June 1964; 62 years ago 09:10 (CET)
- Attack type: Mass murder, school massacre, murder-suicide, arson
- Weapons: Homemade flamethrower, homemade spear, homemade mace
- Deaths: 11 (including the perpetrator)
- Injuries: 22
- Perpetrator: Walter Seifert
- Motive: Persecutory delusion

The Cologne school massacre was a mass murder that occurred at the Catholic elementary school (German: katholische Volksschule) located in the suburb of Volkhoven in Cologne, North Rhine-Westphalia, West Germany, on 11 June 1964. The perpetrator, Walter Seifert, also known as "Der Feuerteufel von Volkhoven" ("Firedevil of Volkhoven"), attacked the people at the school with a home-made flamethrower and a spear, killing eight pupils and two teachers, and wounding twenty-two others. When police arrived at the scene, Seifert fled from the school compound and poisoned himself. He was taken to a hospital, where he died the same evening.

== Perpetrator ==
Seifert

Willi Walter Seifert (19 June 1921 – 11 June 1964) was born in Bickendorf, a district of Cologne, in what was then Weimar Germany. He was the son of a glass-grinder and had one brother. From 1927 to 1935 Seifert attended the Volksschule in Ehrenfeld and afterwards started an apprenticeship as a metal worker at a machine factory, which he successfully finished in 1939. In 1941, during the Second World War, he was drafted into the Luftwaffe and attended the Waffentechnische Schule der Luftwaffe (Weaponry Technology School of the Airforce) for a year. By the end of the war Seifert was a sergeant in an anti-aircraft battery and afterwards was a prisoner of war for several months.

At war's end, Seifert worked for a Cologne car factory, before joining the Schutzpolizei on 14 November 1945. On 23 August 1946, he was treated for a bronchial catarrh, and an examination by a specialist on 5 September diagnosed tuberculosis in the right lung, resulting in Seifert being deemed unfit for service and dismissed from the police on 30 September. From then on Seifert attempted to enforce his claims for subsistence, feeling he was being treated unfairly and cheated of his war pension by the government.

In 1953 Seifert's tuberculosis was found to be inactive and he was declared to have a reduced earning capacity of 30%, though any causality between his illness and his imprisonment during the war was denied. Seifert contested this, accused the doctors of creating false medical reports and complained in long letters to various authorities about his problems.

In August 1954 Seifert was examined by a public health officer, who was of the opinion that he was not in need of a regimen but suggested that he could be sent to a sanatorium for observation. The doctor also noted in his report that Seifert was a mentally devious person with no will to recover. Seifert again contested the report and wrote a letter titled "Sozialpolitik - Sozialärzte — Sozialmord" (social politics — social doctors — social murder), whereupon he was examined by a medical specialist who noted Seifert's quirky behaviour, his scattered train of thought and his constant smile in inappropriate situations. He also recorded that Seifert harboured paranoid thoughts about his doctors and showed a peculiar fanatical behaviour, coming to the conclusion that he had paranoid schizophrenia, but did not have him hospitalised since he did not show any violent or dangerous behaviour. Meanwhile, Seifert revealed to his brother that he had a plan to kidnap young girls and hold them captive in the cellar of his moped trailer.

On 7 October 1955 Seifert married Renata Urszula and reportedly fell apart when she died of an embolism during premature birth on 11 February 1961. Holding the doctors responsible for the death of his wife, he wrote a 120-page letter titled "Muttermord — Einzelschicksal und Analyse eines Systems" (Matricide - Individual fate and analysis of a system) and sent it to agencies, doctors and pharmaceutical manufacturers. Therein Seifert tried to prove that the treatment of his wife's embolism was done wrong, called society a criminal system and equated doctors with murderers, writing:

The doctor is the greatest mass murderer of the poor in the history of mankind (...) What to do? Appeal to their 'conscience' – useless, whoever does something like that has no conscience. Does the aforementioned science count before any court? No, thus begins the vigilante justice, the terror of the medical society in the pluralistic chaos of criminality. But terror can only be extirpated with counter-terror, and whoever denies me the protection of the law forces the cudgel into my hand.

=== Weapons ===
Seifert had made all of his weapons about two months prior to the attack. The spear was made from a broomstick and a triangular scraper, while he used a pump bracket to create the mace. His flamethrower was made from an insecticide sprayer with a wire netting attached to the nozzle, and filled with a mixture of old motor oil and paint thinner.

== Massacre ==
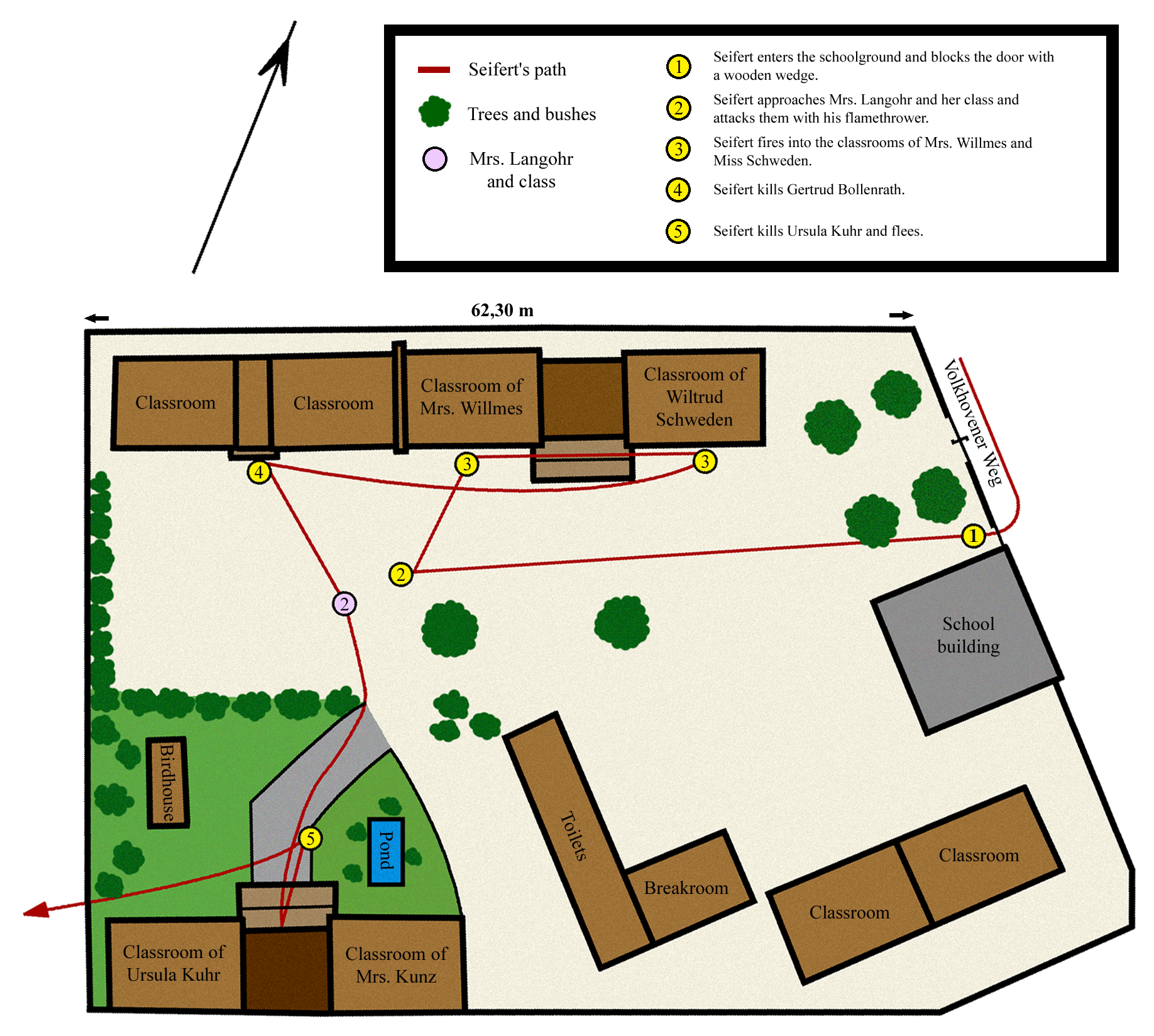
Seifert's path through the school

On 11 June 1964, shortly after 09:00, Seifert approached the schoolyard of the Catholic elementary school located at Volkhovener Weg 209–211, armed with a self-made flamethrower, a spear and a mace. The school consisted of one main building and four wooden barracks, each housing two classes with a total of eight teachers and 380 pupils.

As Seifert entered the school compound through the smaller of two gates, he was observed by three crossing guards who mistook him for a mechanic trying to repair the gate's broken lock and asked him what he was doing there. Seifert ignored them and, after blocking off the gate with a wooden wedge, proceeded towards a girls' physical education class led by teacher Anna Langohr at the schoolyard. When Langohr, who knew Seifert, asked if she could help him, he ignited his flamethrower and attacked her and the girls.

Seifert then went to one of the school's barracks, smashed in the windows with the mace and aimed his weapon at the children in the classrooms, setting them on fire. He continued to attack the people running and jumping out of the burning building until his flamethrower ran out of fuel, whereupon he threw it away. When teacher Gertrud Bollenrath stepped out on the schoolyard Seifert fatally stabbed her in the chest with his spear and then approached the barrack where Ursula Kuhr and Mrs Kunz were teaching. The two women tried to keep the doors shut, but Seifert managed to open one and caused Kuhr to lose her balance. After she fell down the flight of stairs and landed on the ground in front of the building Seifert stabbed her in both legs and once between her shoulders.

Seifert fled the school compound and attempted to kill himself by swallowing E605, a poisonous insecticide, but as the substance was diluted he did not die immediately. Chased by twenty to thirty people he ran towards a railway embankment where he tried to fend off his pursuers with his spear. When police arrived at the scene at 09:38 he tried to stab one of the officers but was eventually immobilised with a shot in his leg. He was arrested and taken to the University Hospital in Lindenthal, where he was questioned several times, before he died at 20:35.

The attack lasted for about fifteen minutes. Kuhr died at the scene, while Bollenrath died from her wounds in hospital at 13:00. Along with teachers Langohr and Wiltrud Schweden, twenty-eight pupils were taken to hospitals, some of them with burns to 90% of their bodies. Eight of the pupils died in the following weeks.

== Victims ==
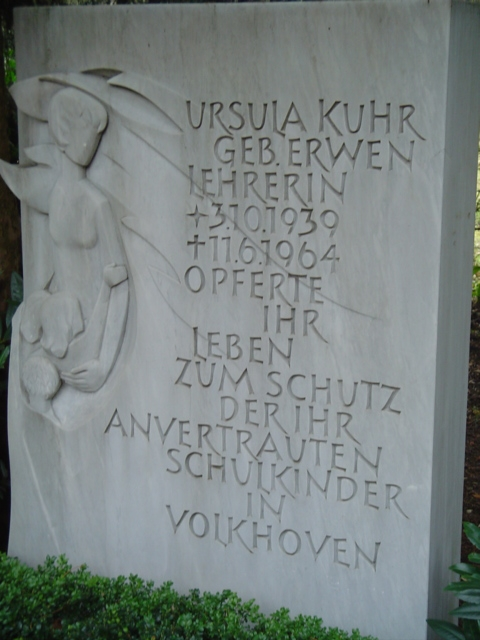
Gravestone for Ursula Kuhr on Cologne Südfriedhof

Teachers:

- Gertrud Bollenrath, aged 62
- Ursula Kuhr, aged 24

Students:

- Dorothea Binner, 9, died on 15 June
- Klara Kröger, 9, died on 16 June
- Stefan Lischka, 9, died on 16 June
- Rosel Röhrig, 12, died on 18 June
- Renate Fühlen, 9, died on 19 June
- Ruth Hoffmann, 10, died on 20 June
- Karin Reinhold, 11, died on 20 June
- Ingeborg Hahn, 9, died on 30 June

== Aftermath ==
Both teachers who died had schools named after them. Anna Langohr, one of the surviving teachers, was presented with the Pro Ecclesia et Pontifice medal by Pope Paul VI as well as with the Medal of Merit ("Verdienstmedaille"), the lowest class of the Order of Merit of the Federal Republic of Germany, and the "Rettungsmedaille of the State of North Rhine Westphalia", a Lifesaving Medal presented to those who risked their lives in the pursuit of saving another person's life. After her death in 1990, aged 93, an elementary school in a neighbouring suburb was named after Langohr.

== See also ==
- List of school attacks in Germany
- List of rampage killers (school massacres)

== Bibliography ==
- Das Todesdrama auf dem Schulhof, Neue Illustrierte Extra-Ausgabe (June 13, 1964)
- Anatomie eines Teufels, Neue Illustrierte (June 28, 1964)
- Der Blutrausch des Amokläufers, Bunte Illustrierte (June 24, 1964)
- Benecke, Mark: Mordmethoden; Bastei Lübbe, 2002. (pp. 288–302) ISBN 978-3785720998
- Peter, Barbara: Das Herz der Stadt stand still; Sh-Verlag, 2004. ISBN 978-3894981440
