= Gutenberg-Gymnasium Erfurt =

School in Germany

Coordinates: 50°58′52″N 11°00′50″E

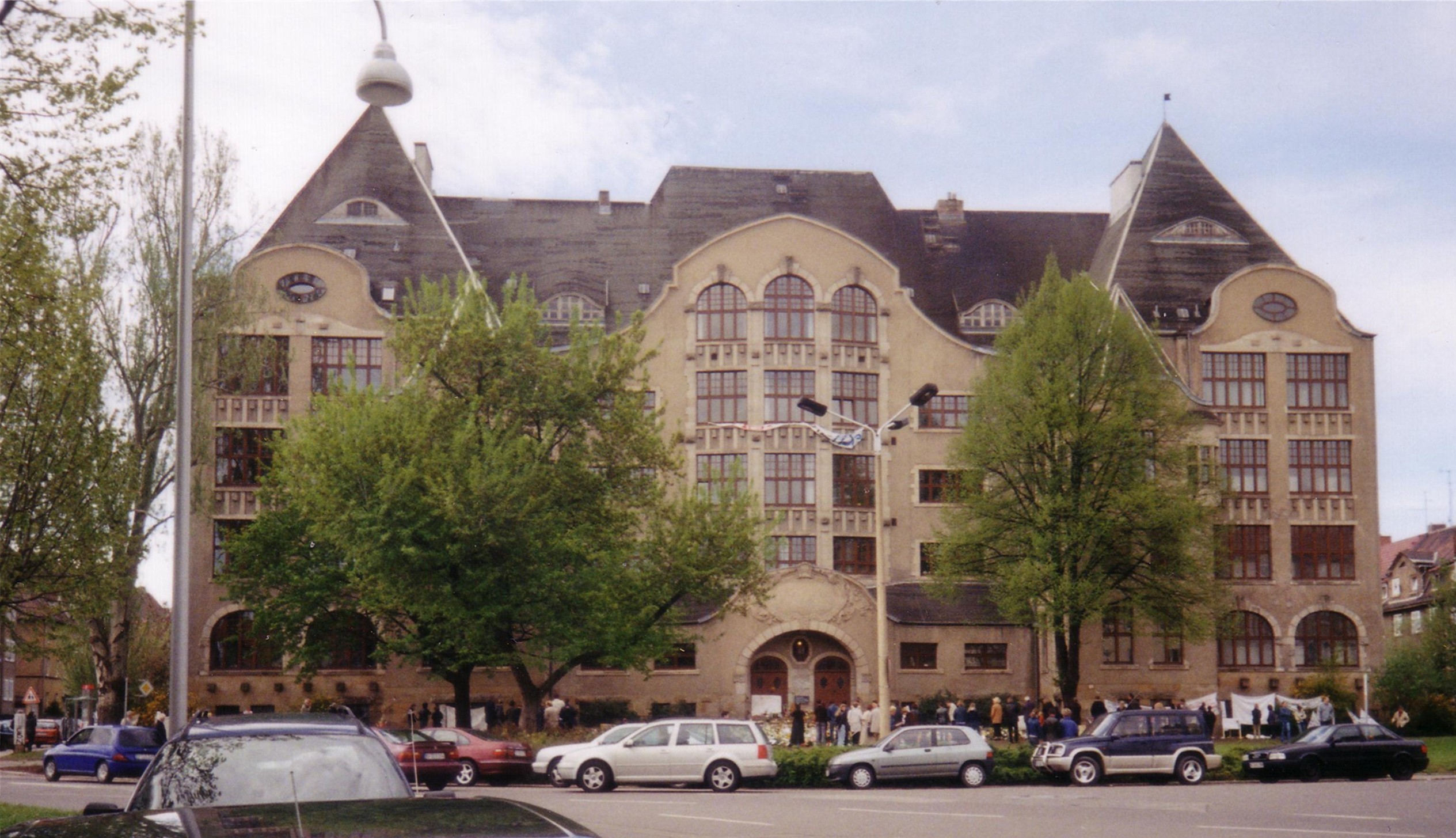
Gutenberg Gymnasium

The Gutenberg-Gymnasium Erfurt is a gymnasium (secondary school) located in Erfurt, Germany. It opened in 1991 and has approximately 750 students between the ages of 10 and 19.

== History ==
- The Gutenberg-Gymnasium was formed from the earlier "Gutenberg School" which was built in 1908. Before the German reunification the Art Nouveau building housed a Polytechnic Secondary School.
- In 2001 the school celebrated its tenth anniversary with a series of events such as dances.
- It shares a twin-school relationship with two other schools, one in Mainz and the other with Bowling Green High School in Bowling Green, Kentucky, United States.

== Massacre ==
On April 26, 2002, 19-year-old Robert Steinhäuser, a recently expelled student, brought two firearms to school and moved from classroom to classroom shooting teachers, and altogether killed 13 teachers and 2 students. When police arrived on the scene, he shot an officer in the neck, killing him instantly. He was then locked in a room by a teacher, where he committed suicide. Subsequent to these events, the school was closed for renovations and officially re-opened more than three years later on August 29, 2005. German chancellor Gerhard Schröder spoke at the ceremony.
