= 2006 Emsdetten school shooting =

Mass shooting in Emsdetten, Germany

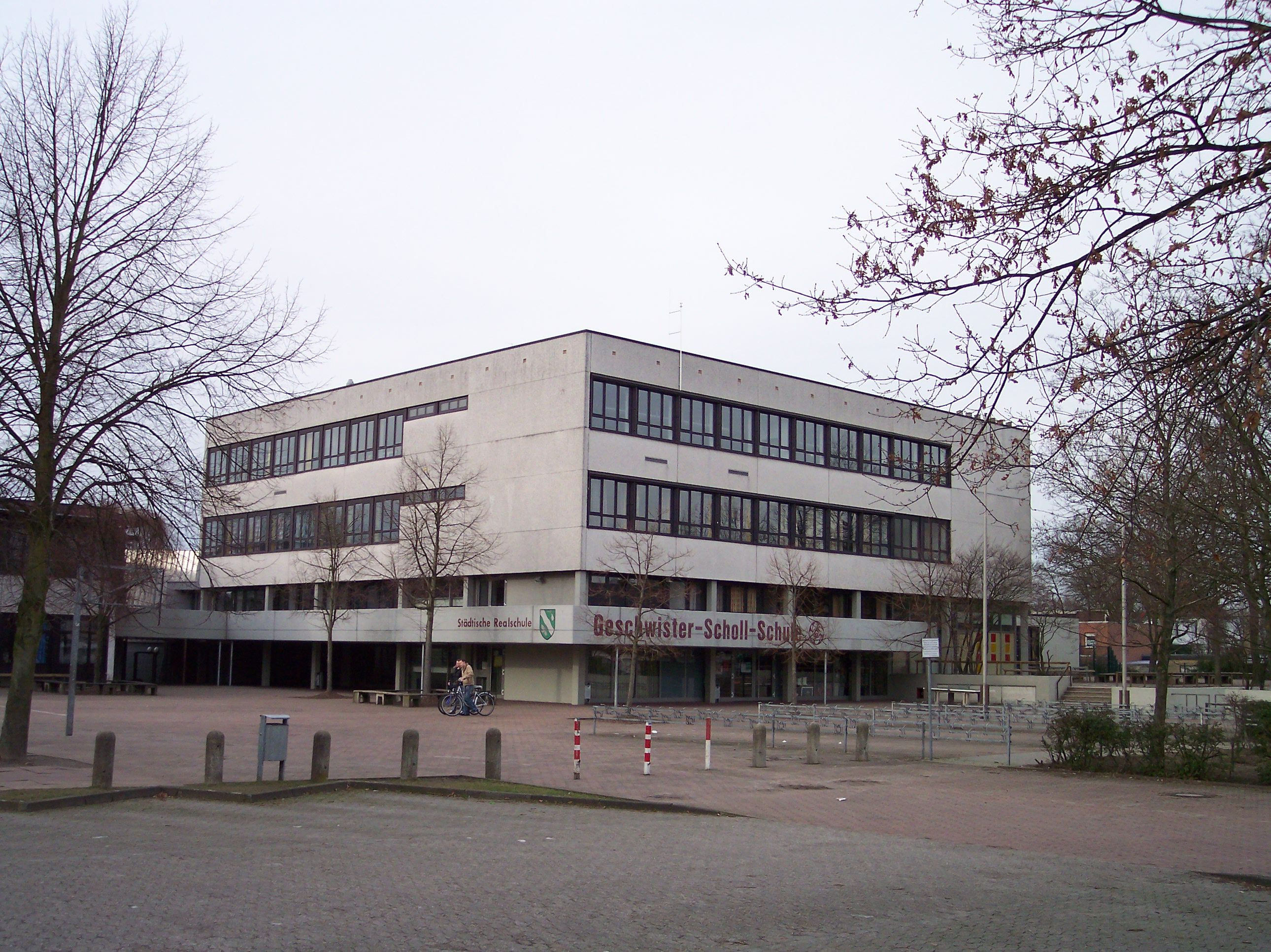
- Geschwister Scholl-Schule in 2007
- Location: 52.1658°N 7.5302°E; Emsdetten, North Rhine-Westphalia, Germany
- Date: 20 November 2006 c. 9:20 a.m.–10:36 a.m. (UTC+1)
- Target: Geschwister Scholl-Schule
- Attack type: School shooting; mass shooting
- Weapons: Sawed-off Burgo .22-calibre bolt-action rifle; Sawed-off Ardesa percussion rifle; Ardesa "Patriot" caplock pistol; Homemade bombs; Air pistol (unused); Knife (unused); Machete (Unused; Left in car)
- Deaths: 1 (the perpetrator)
- Injuries: 37 (8 by gunfire, 1 by smoke grenade, and 28 by indirect smoke inhalation)
- Perpetrator: Sebastian Bosse
- Motive: Revenge against school; Anarchist political statement; Misanthropy

On 20 November 2006, a mass shooting occurred at the Geschwister-Scholl-Schule in Emsdetten, Germany, when 18-year-old former student Sebastian Bosse shot and wounded eight people and set off several smoke bombs before committing suicide.

Even though there were no fatalities besides that of the gunman, the shooting was at one point considered to be the worst school shooting in the history of Germany since the Erfurt massacre, in which 17 people, including the perpetrator, were killed. This position is now held by the 2009 Winnenden school shooting, which left 16 people dead, including the perpetrator.

== Details ==
=== The shooting ===
On 20 November 2006, at approximately 9:20 a.m. local time, Bosse drove to the Geschwister Scholl-Schule and strode into the schoolyard with his weapons, wearing a long black trench coat and a black gas mask. On the way, he started firing randomly and wounded the school janitor, who was seriously injured by a shot in the stomach. A female teacher who was following the janitor was also injured when Bosse threw a smoke bomb, which hit her in the face. Around ten minutes after the shooting started, police were informed of the incident.

Bosse entered the school building, firing several more shots and wounding seven students. He also lit several smoke bombs, filling the building up with smoke. At 9:34 a.m., police arrived, but found entry into the school extremely difficult. At 9:58 a.m., a special task force finally breached the school and searched the building, discovering the body of Bosse on the second floor at 10:36 a.m., 38 minutes after entry. Bosse had shot himself in the mouth, although it was initially unclear if he had shot himself or was killed by the detonation of an explosive device that was attached to his body. Explosive experts had to be brought in to defuse the explosives found strapped to his body, as well as additional explosives found around the school.

=== Victims ===
Bosse was the only fatality in the shooting, while a total of 37 people were injured. Seven students and the school janitor all suffered gunshot wounds, which were aimed towards the chest, stomach, arm, knee, and hand. A pregnant female teacher also suffered facial injuries when she was hit by a thrown smoke bomb. In addition, 28 police officers had to be treated for respiratory problems due to smoke inhalation, while others students suffered from shock.

=== Weapons ===
During the attack, Bosse was armed with a Burgo .22-calibre bolt-action rifle, an Ardesa percussion rifle, an air pistol, and an Ardesa "Patriot" caplock pistol. The barrels and stocks of the two rifles were sawed off. In addition, three smoke bombs and a knife were found on Bosse's body, ten additional smoke bombs and an incendiary bomb in his backpack, and four pipe bombs planted around the school. A search in his car recovered four more smoke bombs, three incendiary bombs, and a machete. A search in his parents' house recovered a gas gun, an airsoft weapon, an air rifle, and various chemicals.

Bosse purchased the percussion rifle from an online weapons dealer. The dealer confirmed that Bosse had participated in three online auctions during the two months prior to the attack; all three auctions sold weapons. However, the auctions only sold weapons to people aged over 18 years. Attorney Wolfgang Schweer confirmed to the WDR that no investigation was launched against the auctions. The bolt-action rifle that Bosse was armed with during the attack had been purchased by him from a 24-year-old male relative in exchange for an airsoft gun; the man was not aware of Bosse's true intent.

== Perpetrator ==
Sebastian Bosse

Sebastian "Bastian" Bosse (29 April 1988 – 20 November 2006) had graduated from the Geschwister Scholl-Schule in 2006. He was generally known by others as "Bastian". According to the public prosecutor's office, the motive for the attack was "general life frustration". While attending the school, he had social problems with classmates and was forced to repeat two classes. He was also known by others to listen to death metal music, wearing all-black or camouflage clothing and having an affinity for firearms. He reportedly went on hunting trips with his father, a postman.

It was stated from his diary, police investigations and statements from his classmates that he was bullied. An investigation later found a suicide note written by him, which stated that he wanted to "be happy ever again" and that he couldn't stand everyday restrictions on his freedom. The note said:

Ich habe in den 18 Jahren meines Lebens erfahren müssen, das man nur Glücklich werden kann, wenn man sich der Masse fügt, der Gesellschaft anpasst. Aber das konnte und wollte ich nicht. Ich bin frei! Niemand darf in mein Leben eingreifen, und tut er es doch hat er die Konsequenzen zu tragen! Kein Politiker hat das Recht Gesetze zu erlassen, die mir Dinge verbieten. Kein Bulle hat das Recht mir meine Waffe wegzunehmen, schon gar nicht während er seine am Gürtel trägt.

I have had to learn in the 18 years of my life, that one can only be happy when you blend in and adapt to society. But I couldn't and I did not want to. I am free! No person shall engage in my life and if he does, he has to face the consequences! No politician has the right to make laws that prohibit me things. No cop has the right to take away my gun and certainly not while he's wearing one at his belt.

It also said:

Ich hasse euch und eure Art! Ihr müsst alle sterben! Seit meinem 6. Lebensjahr wurde ich von euch allen verarscht! Nun müsst ihr dafür bezahlen! [...] Als letztes möchte ich den Menschen die mir was bedeuten, oder die jemals gut zu mir waren, danken, und mich für all dies Entschuldigen! Ich bin weg...

I hate you and the way you are! You all have to die! Since I was 6, you've all been taking the piss out of me! Now you're going to pay! [...] Finally, I want to apologise for all this to the people who mean something to me or who were ever good to me! I'm gone ...

Two-and-a-half years prior to the attack, Bosse had announced his intents on an Internet forum and asked for psychological help. He also posted pictures and videos from a site called Airsoftspielen, as well as bomb-making videos on a personal website. Additional photos on the website showed Bosse with a variety of weapons, including a submachine gun, in public. On Sunday evening before the attack, Bosse posted four videos on his website, in which he and another person operated with weapons and explosives. The site was closed immediately after the attack by the North Rhine-Westphalia police, but its contents were copied in response to the closing and was placed on a number of other websites. Bosse had planned the attack extensively, according to contents of his diary.

The Rheine district court revealed that Bosse had gone into an open-air event with a gas gun in his possession. He had been drinking alcoholic beverages at the time. Police were alerted to the incident and seized his gas gun. Although Bosse had an insufficient gun license, this didn't bar him from holding such weapons at public events. It was also reported that he was due in court prior to the shooting, on charges of illegal possession of a Walther P38 pistol.

Shortly before the attack, Bosse had left an Internet posting and a video message from his parents' living room. He had stated that he hated people and was taught to be a "loser" at his school. He also left a suicide note on his website, which has since been deleted.

== Aftermath ==
The event caused renewed demands for a prohibition of violent video games (called Killerspiele, "killing games" by German media and politicians) in Germany, since police determined that Bosse "spent most of his waking hours" playing Counter-Strike.

Starting in mid-2008, computer games were released with a much larger USK rating label, complying with a change made to Article 12 of the JuSchG. The labels themselves were subsequently re-designed in 2009 following heavy criticism from customers.

== See also ==
- List of school attacks in Germany
- 2016 Munich shooting
- Ansbach school attack
- Erfurt massacre
- Winnenden school shooting
- List of school-related attacks
