= Albertville-Realschule =

- Albertville-Realschule
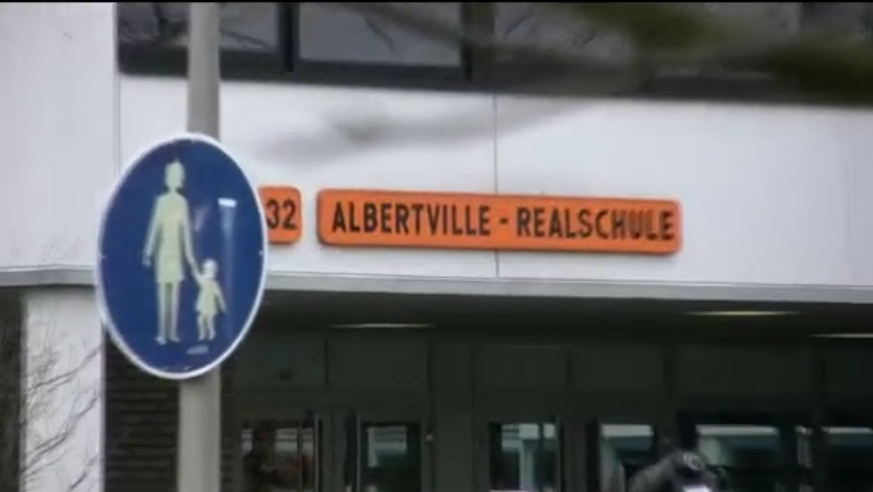

Location
- Albertviller-Straße 32; 71364 Winnenden; Rems-Murr-Kreis; Baden-Württemberg; Germany
- Coordinates: 48°52′08″N 9°23′55″E

Information
- School type: Public Realschule
- Established: 1961
- Head of school: Astrid Hahn
- Teaching staff: 32
- Grades: 5–10
- Website: www.ars-winnenden.de

The Albertville-Realschule is one of seven secondary schools and one of the two Realschules in Winnenden in the Rems-Murr-Kreis in Baden-Württemberg. It gained notoriety because of the Winnenden school shooting that occurred on March 11, 2009.

The Schule was previously called Realschule Winnenden I im Bildungszentrum II and was renamed Albertville-Realschule after the twinning with Albertville in the French Alps in 1980. 580 pupils in 20 classes were lectured by 32 teachers at the Realschule in 2009.

The school has been offering a student exchange program with the Collège La Combe de Savoie in Albertville since 1981 and with the Vörösmarty Mihaly Gimnázium in Budapest since 2007.

On March 11, 2009, a 17-year-old apprentice and former student of the school Opened Fired in the school, killing twelve people, including nine students and three teachers, before fleeing. After killing three pedestrians, the shooter committed suicide after having a brief shootout with police.

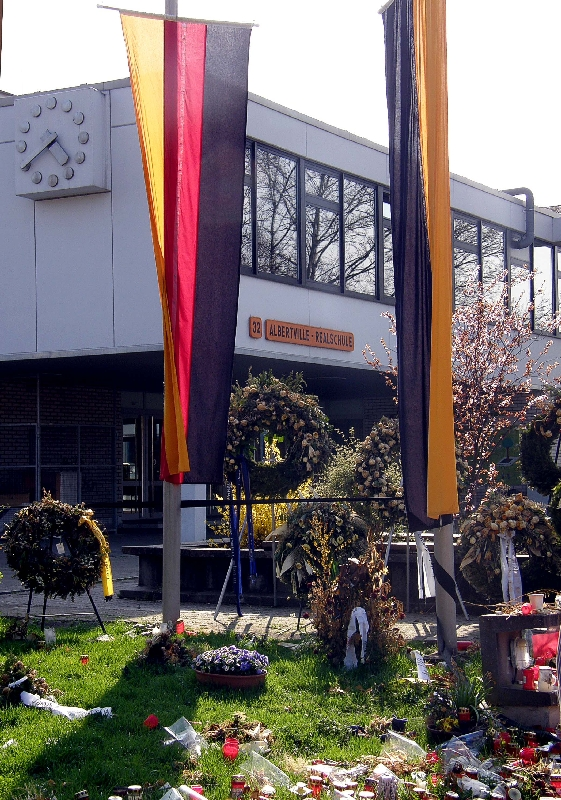
Albertville-Realschule
