= 2009 Winnenden shootings =

2009 shooting spree in Winnenden, Germany

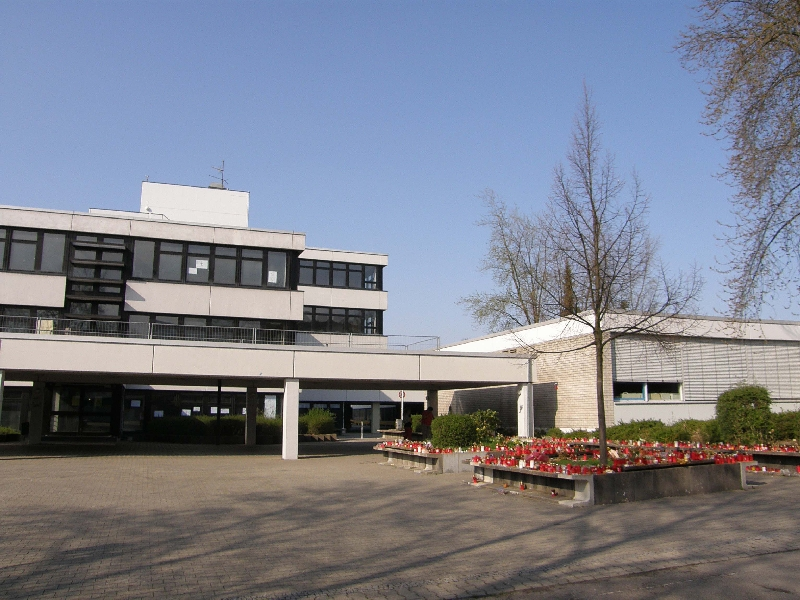
- Albertville-Realschule in Winnenden, 21 days after the shooting
- Location: 48°52′07″N 9°23′55″E; Winnenden and Wendlingen, Baden-Württemberg, Germany
- Date: 11 March 2009; 09:30 – 13:08 (CET; UTC+01:00)
- Target: Students and teachers
- Attack type: School shooting; mass shooting; mass murder; spree shooting; murder–suicide; shootout
- Weapon: 9mm Beretta 92FS semi-automatic pistol
- Deaths: 16 (including the perpetrator and 2 in Wendlingen)
- Injuries: 9
- Perpetrator: Tim Kretschmer
- Motive: Inconclusive

On 11 March 2009, a series of shootings took place at the Albertville-Realschule in Winnenden and a car dealership in Wendlingen, Baden-Württemberg, Germany. Fifteen people were killed and nine were injured before the perpetrator, 17-year-old former student Tim Kretschmer, killed himself during a shootout with police.

== Shootings ==
=== Albertville school shooting ===
Locations of the incident within Germany

In the Albertville-Realschule at approximately 09:30, Kretschmer first began shooting with a 9mm Beretta 92FS semi-automatic pistol, which he had stolen from his parents. Eyewitness reports state that Kretschmer started on the first upstairs floor, where he made a beeline for two top-floor classrooms and a chemistry laboratory. In the first classroom (Class 9C which was receiving a Spanish lesson), Kretschmer fatally shot five students in the head at close range without warning. He then entered the next classroom (Class 10D which was receiving a German lesson), killed two more students, and wounded nine more, two of whom would die of their wounds en route to the hospital. As Kretschmer left the room to reload his weapon, the teacher reportedly closed the door and locked it. After unsuccessfully trying to shoot off the lock, Kretschmer then moved on to the chemistry laboratory, where he shot and killed the teacher. Students escaped Kretschmer by jumping out of windows. In the three targeted classrooms, he killed nine students and one teacher. He shot most of the victims in the head. Kretschmer fired more than 60 rounds at the school.

The school headmaster broadcast a coded announcement ("Mrs Koma is coming", which is amok spelled backwards) alerting teachers and staff of the situation; they locked classroom doors. This coded alert had been used by German educators after the Erfurt school massacre in April 2002.

After receiving an emergency call from a student at 09:33, three police officers reached the scene two minutes later and entered the school, interrupting the shooting spree. Kretschmer shot at them and fled the building, killing two teachers in the hall as he departed. He killed a total of 12 people at the school. A quantity of unused ammunition was recovered from the school. "It appears the perpetrator may have intended to do far more harm at the school than he managed," said chief criminal investigator Ralf Michelfelder.

=== Escape and carjacking ===
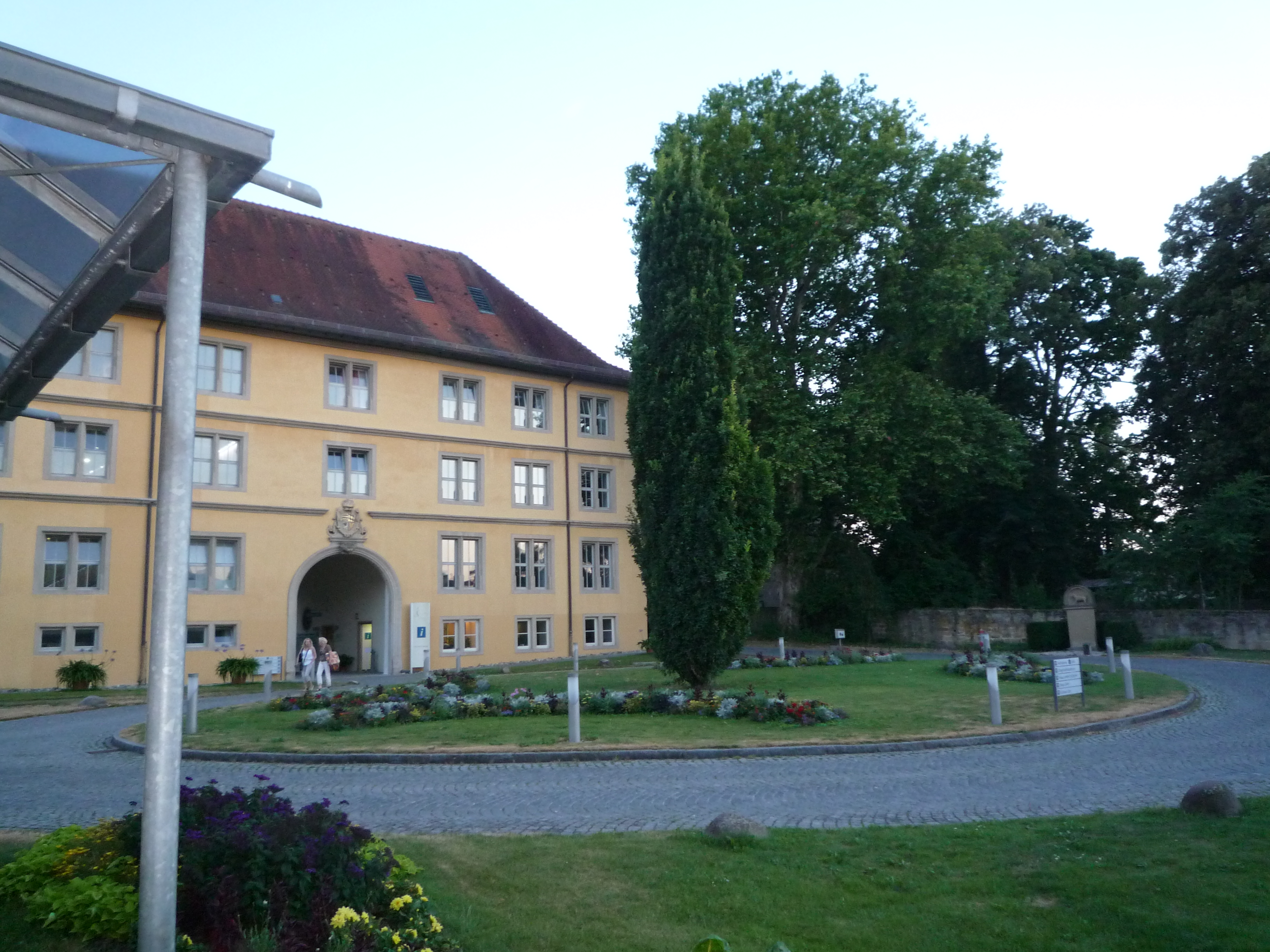
The psychiatric institution near the school where Kretschmer killed a 56-year-old employee

At around 09:45, Kretschmer fled the scene and killed a 56-year-old groundskeeper of the nearby ZfP Klinikum Schloß Winnenden mental hospital, shooting the man four times as he was standing in a pond. Large numbers of police officers secured the school building and searched for Kretschmer throughout Winnenden for hours without success. News reports confirmed that Kretschmer was on the run and warned motorists not to pick up any hitchhikers.

At approximately 10:00, Kretschmer carjacked a first-generation Volkswagen Sharan minivan at a car park in Winnenden. From his position on the rear seat, Kretschmer ordered the car's driver, 41-year-old Igor Wolf, to drive towards Wendlingen, 40 kilometres (25 mi) from Winnenden. Kretschmer and the driver went westwards into the suburbs of the state capital, Stuttgart, travelling through the towns and districts of Waiblingen, Fellbach and Bad Cannstatt, before driving on the B14 dual carriageway through the Heslach Tunnel onto the A81 motorway towards Böblingen and Tübingen. During slow traffic, Kretschmer asked Wolf if he should "pull a prank" and open fire on the motorists ahead. The two drove onto the B27 dual carriageway before leaving on the B313 to Nürtingen.

Wolf later reported that, when asked why he was doing this, Kretschmer replied, "For fun, because it is fun." According to Wolf, Kretschmer revealed his intentions as he was loading his pistol magazines during the journey "Do you think we will find another school?" Wolf says he quickly changed the conversation then. Shortly after 12:00, just before the Wendlinger junction to the A8 Autobahn, Wolf spotted an approaching police patrol. At a bend in the road, Wolf steered the car onto the grass verge and jumped from the vehicle, running away towards police, shouting that he was kidnapped in Winnenden.

=== Wendlingen shootout ===
Kretschmer immediately left the car and ran towards the nearby industrial area, entering a Volkswagen car showroom through the main entrance. He threatened a salesperson and demanded a key for one of the vehicles. The salesperson escaped while Kretschmer was distracted. Kretschmer shot and killed another salesperson and a customer, firing 13 bullets into the two people. As he reloaded, another salesperson and visitor fled through the rear exit. Kretschmer emerged at about 12:30 and shot at a passing car. The driver escaped without injury. The police arrived and a shootout began. An officer fired eight shots at Kretschmer, hitting him once in each leg.

Kretschmer returned to the car showroom, firing 12 shots from within the building at police from nearby Nürtingen, who were gradually surrounding the building. He left the rear of the building and ran across a yard to a neighbouring business complex, where he shot and injured two police officers in an unmarked police vehicle.

According to police reports, at this point Kretschmer continued to shoot at random, shooting at nearby buildings and people, including an employee of a firm who was trying to lock the door. Witnesses described observing Kretschmer as he reloaded his pistol before shooting himself in the head. The final seconds of the shootout were captured with a mobile phone video camera.

According to forensic evidence, Kretschmer fired a total of 112 rounds, 60 of which were fired at the school, and he had about 110 unused bullets on him when he died.

=== Victims ===
Kretschmer killed 15 people, including nine students and three teachers at the school, before killing himself. They are:

At Winnenden:

- Jacqueline Hahn, 16 (student)
- Ibrahim Halilaj, 17 (student)
- Franz Josef Just, 56 (handyman and gardener)
- Stefanie Tanja Kleisch, 16 (student)
- Michaela Köhler, 26 (trainee teacher)
- Selina Marx, 15 (student)
- Nina Denise Mayer, 24 (trainee teacher)
- Viktorija Minasenko, 16 (student)
- Nicole Elisabeth Nalepa, 16 (student)
- Chantal Schill, 15 (student)
- Jana Natascha Schober, 15 (student)
- Sabrina Schüle, 24 (trainee teacher)
- Kristina Strobel, 16 (student)

At Wendlingen:

- Denis Puljic, 36 (worked in the car dealership)
- Sigurt Peter Gustav Wilk, 46 (customer at the car dealership)

== Perpetrator ==
Kretschmer, c. 2008

Tim Kretschmer (26 July 1991 – 11 March 2009) lived with his parents in the neighbouring municipality of Leutenbach. He had graduated from Albertville Realschule in 2008 with relatively poor grades.

Kretschmer's failing grades had prevented him from entering an apprenticeship. He was attending a commercial high school (Donner + Kern) in Waiblingen to prepare for an apprenticeship for a commercial career. Several accounts described him as having depression. Kretschmer was described by a friend as "a lonely and frustrated person who felt rejected by society". An anonymous friend described Kretschmer as a quiet student who began to withdraw from his peers.

He was an avid table tennis player and had hoped to become a professional player. Marko Habijanec, a Croatian table tennis player who coached Kretschmer at the Erdmannhausen sports club between 2000 and 2003, remembers him as being "a bit spoiled", with his mother fulfilling many of his demands. According to Habijanec, Kretschmer had great difficulties accepting defeat: he would have a temper tantrum, yelling and throwing his racket. The coach said that, having a high opinion of his own abilities, Kretschmer openly denigrated his teammates. When Habijanec discussed Kretschmer's attitude with his mother, he discovered she sided fully with her son.

Media reports say he enjoyed playing the video game Counter-Strike and playing with airsoft guns. Commentators also noted that "game addiction is a symptom of something wrong and not a cause". He also shot his guns in the forest behind his home and also in the basement of his house. On his last day alive, Kretschmer played the video game Far Cry 2 using the username "JawsPredator1".

=== Online activities ===
He had profiles at "MyVideo.de", Kwick.de and other websites. He often played poker with his classmates in the "Cafe Tunix" after school hours in Waiblingen.

After a forensic search of his computer, officers found that Kretschmer was interested in sadomasochistic scenes where a man is bound and humiliated by women. He viewed such a movie the evening before his attacks. Kretschmer also researched previous mass shootings such as the Erfurt school massacre, the 2006 Emsdetten school shooting and the Columbine High School massacre.

=== Mental health problems ===
Kretschmer did not have a criminal record. The press reported that in 2008, Kretschmer had received treatment as an in-patient at the Weissenhoff Psychiatric Clinic near the town of Heilbronn. After being discharged, Kretschmer was supposed to continue his treatment as an out-patient in Winnenden, but ended his treatment.

According to police and clinic staff, he had been treated repeatedly for clinical depression on an out-patient basis in 2008. His family rejected these claims and maintained that he never received psychiatric treatment. According to a psychiatric report prepared for the prosecutor's office, Kretschmer met five times with a therapist and talked about his growing anger and violent urges; the therapist informed Kretschmer's parents.

=== Possible motives ===
In a press conference on 12 March, police erroneously reported that Kretschmer had announced his killing spree several hours ahead of time on Krautchan. The next day, police determined that this message had not been written on Kretschmer's computer and was a forgery.

Three weeks before the shooting, Kretschmer had written a letter to his parents, saying that he was suffering and could not go on. In an interview in 2014, Kretschmer's parents stated that they had always loved their son and that they did not have an explanation for his actions. They have since changed their name and moved to a different city.

== Aftermath ==
Police raided the Kretschmer family house at about 11:00 on the day of the shooting. Tim Kretschmer's father legally owned 15 guns as a member of a local marksmen club ("Schützenverein" in German). The Beretta handgun was found missing, along with several hundred rounds of ammunition. Fourteen of the guns were kept in a gun safe, while the Beretta had been kept unsecured in the bedroom.

Five days after the event, prosecutors initiated preliminary proceedings against the father for negligent homicide, since the gun had not been properly locked away as required by German law. The police confiscated the 14 remaining guns. The father announced that he would voluntarily relinquish his gun ownership authorization.

In November 2009, the Public Prosecutor's Department in Stuttgart announced that the father had been indicted on charges of negligent homicide, bodily injury caused by negligence, and violation of the weapons law. On 10 February 2011, the state court in Stuttgart found the father guilty of involuntary manslaughter in 15 cases, bodily harm caused by negligence and the negligent abandonment of a weapon. The father received a suspended sentence of one year and nine months, and appealed the verdict. The appeals court handed out a suspended sentence of one year and six months in 2013.

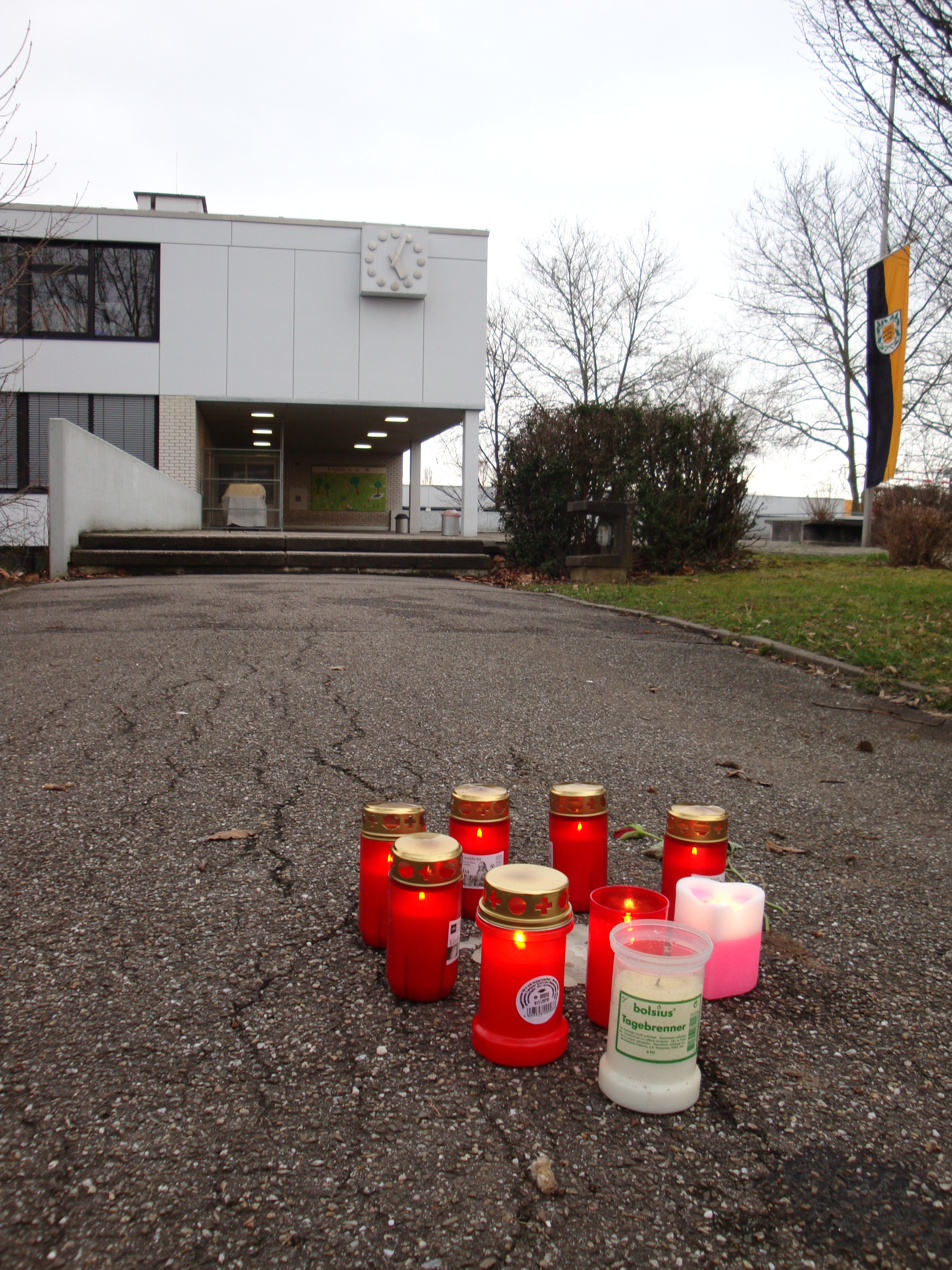
Candles in front of the Albertville school

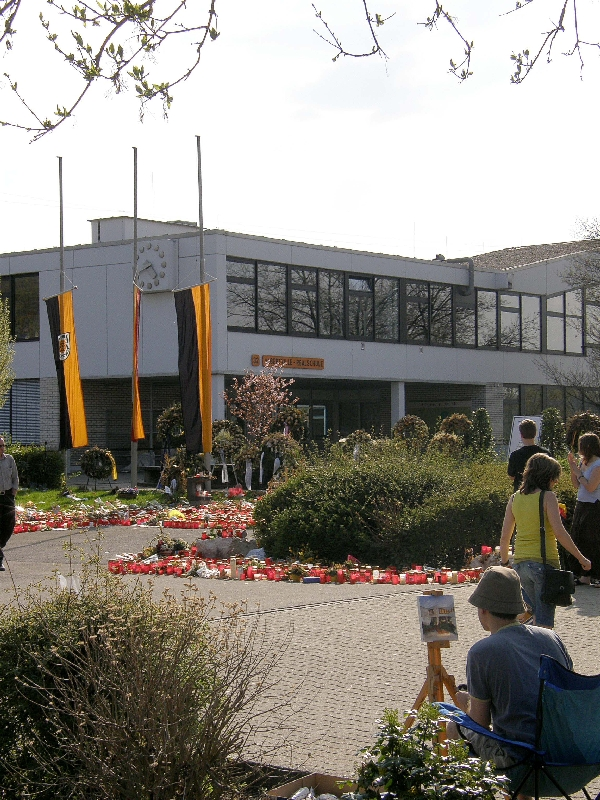
The front of the Albertville school

== Response ==
German President Horst Köhler said he was "appalled and saddened" by the killings, and he and his wife offered condolences to the victims, their families, and friends. Chancellor Angela Merkel described the attack as an "incomprehensible" and "appalling" crime, calling it a day of mourning for all of Germany. Baden-Württemberg Minister-President Günther Oettinger, who traveled to the scene by helicopter, described the event as a "horrible and in no way explainable crime". The European Parliament observed a minute of silence in honour of the victims.

An ecumenical church service was held in Winnenden the evening of the shooting, with Protestant, Catholic and Muslim clerics officiating. All German flags were flown on half-mast until 13 March in memory of the victims.

In the days following the event, some politicians called for legal consequences, including a prohibition of all shooting video games, better monitoring of gun club members, a directive to have all ammunition deposited with police and a provision to have gun club members store their weapons at the club house. Others dismissed such demands as "placebos".

The families of five victims wrote an open letter to Chancellor Angela Merkel, President Horst Köhler and Baden-Württemberg Minister President Günther Oettinger with demands for consequences. They called for a prohibition on youths' access to guns in gun clubs, less violence on TV and a prohibition of violent video games. They also called for reporting of these incidents without highlighting the perpetrator, so as to minimise the chance of copycats.

The German parliament passed legislation in June 2009 to improve handgun security with an electronic nationwide weapons registry, increased age limitations for large-calibre weapons and unannounced, random inspections in gun-owner homes to ensure requirements for locked gun storage were met. Obligatory biometric security systems should be introduced once technically feasible.

In May 2009, Germany announced plans to ban games such as paintball on the grounds that they "trivialise and encourage violence". However, the legislature did not ban these kind of games, did not limit the number of guns owned and did not pass a requirement to store guns with shooting clubs or restrictions regarding ammunition storage in private households.

== See also ==
- List of school massacres by death toll
- List of school attacks in Germany
- List of attacks related to secondary schools
