= Erfurt school massacre =

2002 mass shooting in Germany

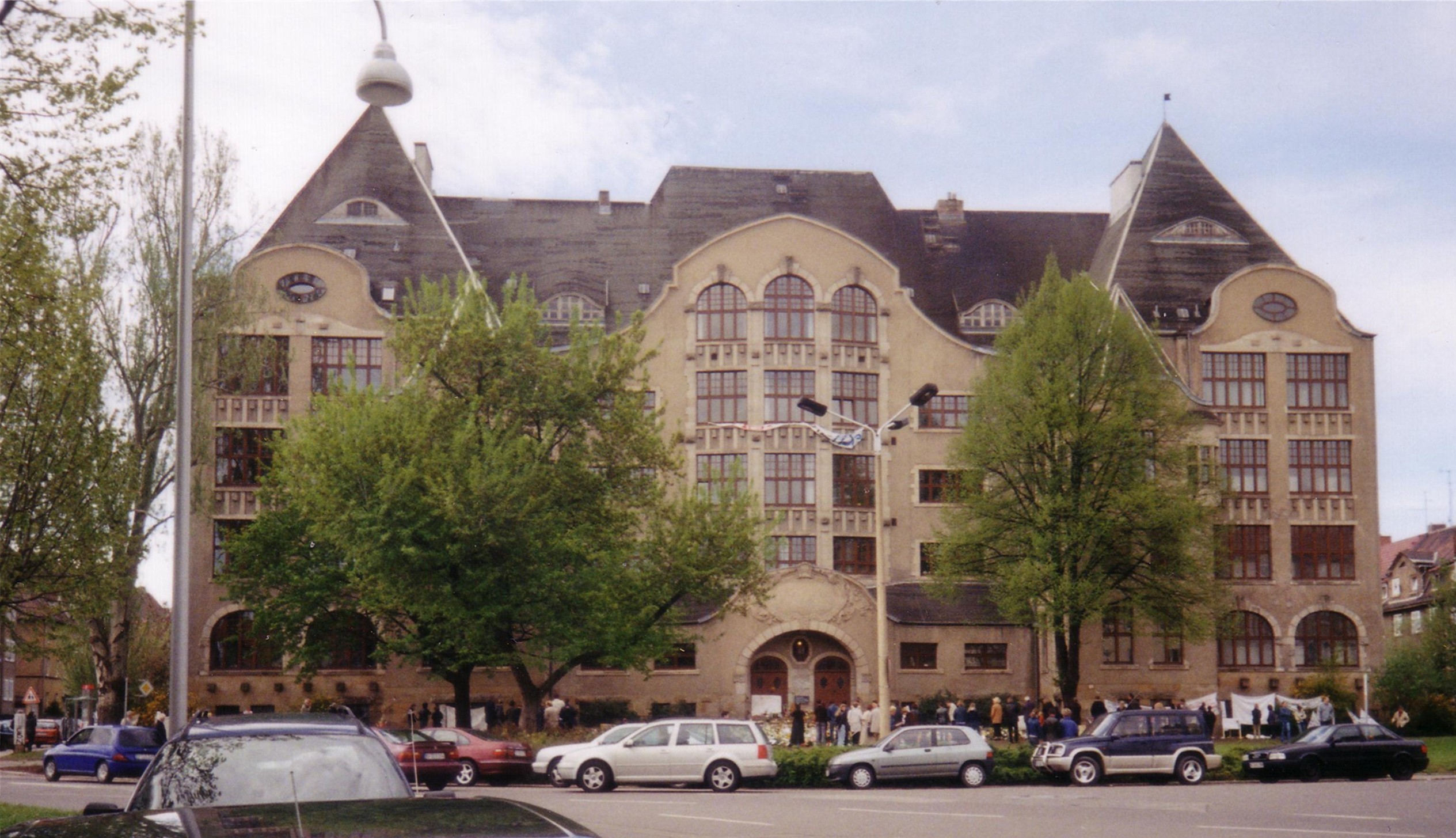
- Gutenberg Gymnasium

- Erfurt (Thuringia) Erfurt (Germany)
- Native name: Amoklauf von Erfurt
- Location: 50.9813°N 11.0147°E; Erfurt, Thuringia, Germany
- Date: 26 April 2002 c. 10:58 a.m. – c. 11:17 a.m. (CEST)
- Target: Teachers and administrators at Gutenberg-Gymnasium
- Attack type: Mass shooting; murder–suicide; mass murder; school shooting
- Weapons: 9mm Glock 17C Semi-automatic pistol; Mossberg 590 Mariner 12-gauge pump-action shotgun (unused); Diving knife (unused)
- Deaths: 17 (including the perpetrator)
- Injuries: 1
- Perpetrator: Robert Steinhäuser
- Motive: Vengeance for expulsion (possibly)

The Erfurt school massacre was a mass shooting that occurred on 26 April 2002 at the Gutenberg-Gymnasium, a secondary school in Erfurt, Thuringia, Germany. The perpetrator, 19-year-old expelled student Robert Steinhäuser, shot and killed 16 people, including a police officer, before killing himself. One person was also wounded by a bullet fragment. According to students, he ignored them and aimed only for the teachers and administrators, although two students were unintentionally killed by shots fired through a locked door.

== Background ==
Robert Steinhäuser (born 22 January 1983) was the perpetrator of the massacre. He was a student of the Gutenberg-Gymnasium until early October 2001 and had previously threatened a teacher. His academic performance declined in 1999, leading him to drop out of the year shortly before the final exam. He was allowed to repeat the 11th year at the request of his parents, approved by the principal. He joined a gun club in October 2000 or 2001 and acquired a gun license.

At the end of September 2001, he had spent a few days away from school, for which he presented a mandatory medical certificate which was quickly identified as a forgery. Because of this forgery, Steinhäuser was expelled by the principal. Due to the regulations used in Thuringia at the time, Steinhäuser, on expulsion, was without any qualifications and therefore had very limited job opportunities.

Steinhäuser did not tell his parents he had been expelled, and pretended he was still attending school. The day of the shooting he told his parents he was going to school to take a math exam. The investigation revealed that Steinhäuser had been using the Internet to research the Columbine High School massacre, and had related files saved on his computer.

== Massacre ==
On the day of the shooting, before leaving his residence at his usual time, Steinhäuser armed himself with a 9mm Glock 17C semi-automatic pistol, a Mossberg 590 Mariner 12-gauge pump-action shotgun, which was unusable due to an earlier handling error, and a diving knife. Steinhäuser entered the school unmasked at approximately 10:45, carrying his weapons and ammunition concealed in either his sports bag or backpack. As Steinhäuser was in the hallway, he encountered the building's caretaker, and briefly talked with him. He asked whether or not Ms. Alt, the principal of the school, was in the building. He went into the men's lavatory on the ground floor and changed some of his clothes, including a black face mask. He left his coat, wallet and identification.

The shooting started shortly before 10:58. From the lavatory, Steinhäuser went to the school office. There, he shot the deputy school principal and the secretary. In the next room was the headmistress, but Steinhäuser did not enter the room despite the door being unlocked. When the headmistress went to check the noise, Steinhäuser had already left the room. Upon discovering the bodies, she locked herself in her office and alerted emergency services. Steinhäuser moved from classroom to classroom between the second and third floor, pausing briefly each time in the doorway to shoot a teacher, then moving on to the next room, sometimes shooting at teachers he encountered in the halls or the stairways. There were two exceptions to this pattern: In Room 208, Steinhäuser had either not seen the present teacher or mistaken her for a student. He thus did not open fire, but returned a few minutes later and shot at the now-barricaded door, fatally wounding two students. In the second instance, history and arts teacher Rainer Heise stated that he had seen Steinhäuser on the school yard, just after he shot a teacher on the grounds, trying to fire at fleeing students before realising his gun was empty. At 11:05, a janitor called the police. At 11:12, the first police car arrived at the school. Steinhäuser opened fire on the police, fatally shooting one of the policemen. A student told other officers around the same time that she had recognised the shooter as Steinhäuser.

In front of the art material Room 111 on the first floor, Steinhäuser met Heise. Steinhäuser, who removed his mask either during or shortly before the encounter, was recognised by Heise as a former student of his history class. In interviews, Heise stated that he told Steinhäuser "You may shoot me now" while looking him in the eyes, after which Steinhäuser lowered his weapon and replied: "Herr Heise, für heute reichts." [Mr Heise, that's enough for today.] According to Heise, he asked Steinhäuser for a private talk in a nearby art material room. When Steinhäuser entered and put his gun on a shelf, Heise pushed Steinhäuser from behind and locked him inside. Steinhäuser killed himself shortly after police entered the building minutes later.

From the first shot to Steinhäuser's suicide the spree lasted no more than 20 minutes. Shortly after 12:00, Steinhäuser's body was found by a special police detachment (SEK) in Room 111. The gunman had killed 16 people: the school's assistant principal, secretary, ten teachers, one trainee-teacher, two students, and one police officer. In total one third of the school's faculty were killed, and two students, aged 14 and 15, were shot by rounds fired through a locked door. He fired around 71 shots in total and reloaded three times during the massacre.

== Reactions ==
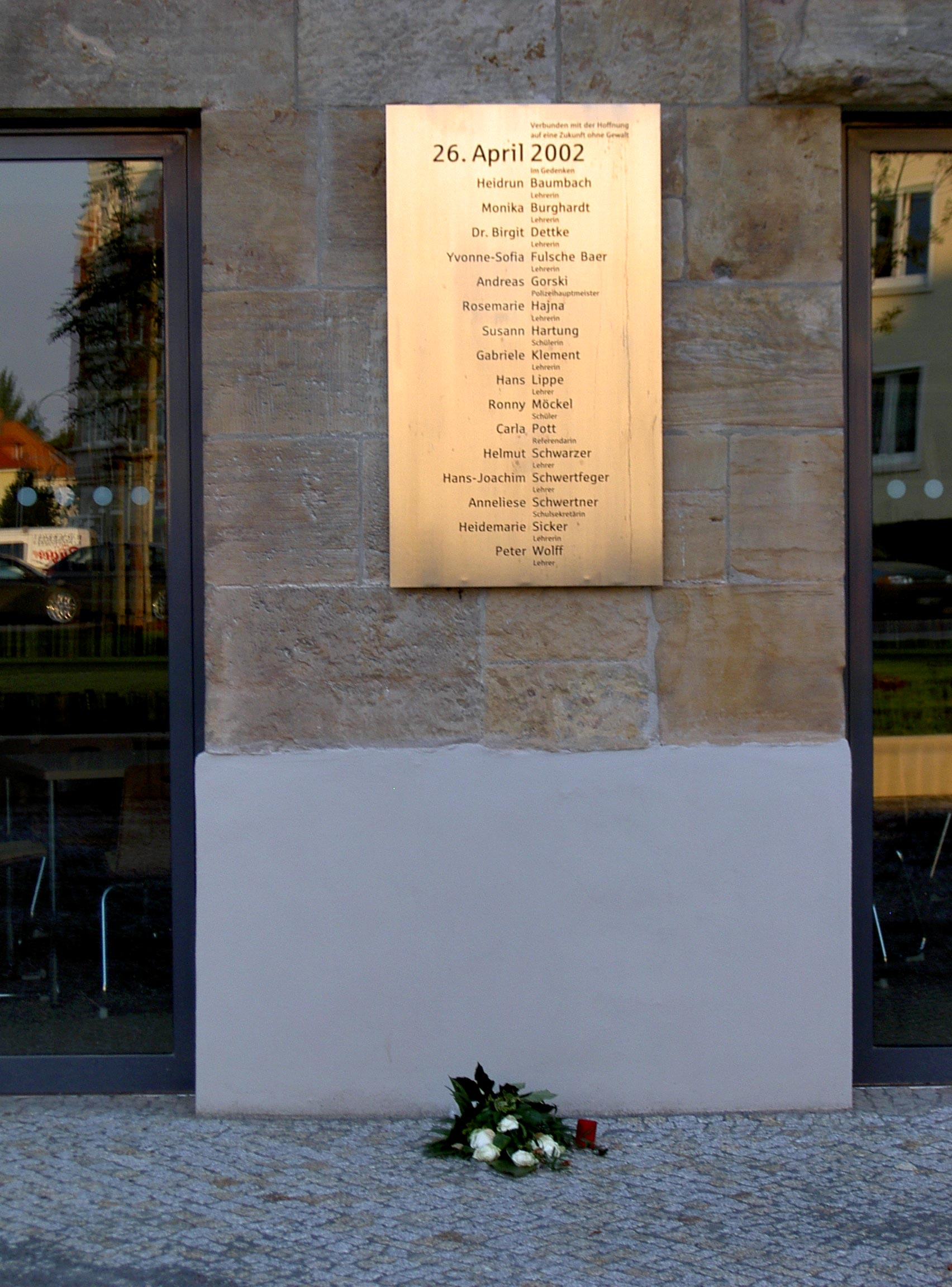
A memorial plaque for the victims of the shooting

Steinhäuser's family issued a statement to news sources saying that they "will forever be sorry that our son and brother has brought such horrifying suffering to the victims and their relatives, the people of Erfurt and Thuringia, and all over Germany."

In 2004, after repeated public criticisms of the police response to the shooting, the state government of Thuringia tasked a committee to release a final report on the shooting. The state government of Thuringia reprimanded the principal of the school for the expulsion of Steinhäuser, saying she had overstepped her legal powers and violated the rules of the procedure. There were no further legal consequences for the principal and she remains in charge of the school as of 2017.

Likewise, the Thuringian education law was caught in the crossfire of criticism. Since Steinhäuser was already an adult, the school administration was not required to inform his parents about their son's expulsion from school. In contrast to most other German states at this time, the state of Thuringia did not automatically award the middle school certificate at the end of the 10th grade. Students who did not pass the final exams therefore did not have a school certificate, which left them with limited job prospects. In response to the shooting, a law was enacted that would give high school students the option to take an exam at the end of the 10th grade at their own request. Since 2004, this exam has been mandatory for all Thuringian high school students.

The shooting also led to public discussions on the effect of violence in media and its effect on the youth, especially in relation to computer games of the first-person shooter genre, so-called killer games and dealing with fictional violence in other media. According to the report of the Gutenberg Commission, Steinhäuser had some violent films such as Fight Club, Predator and Desperado, as well as the video games Return to Castle Wolfenstein, Hitman: Codename 47 and Half-Life. Steinhäuser was apparently not interested in the game Counter-Strike, which was often mentioned in connection with the shooting by the media. The discussions contributed to a revision of the Protection of Young Persons Act and helped to strengthen the rules for these legal areas.

In addition to the reform of the Protection of Young Persons Act, gun laws were tightened. The legal minimum age for those who wanted to join a shooting club was raised from 18 to 21 years and anyone under 25 years wishing to handle firearms was now required to undergo a medical-psychological examination. Pump-action firearms with only a pistol grip were banned. Furthermore, the retention requirements for firearms and ammunition were significantly tightened.

== Legacy ==
After the rampage, around 700 students were diagnosed with post-traumatic stress disorder, about one hundred of whom were still under treatment for one year after the shooting. 10 years after the killing spree, there were still six witnesses in psychological therapy, including four who had initially rejected a follow-up program. These adolescents had "time-delayed disturbances such as memory gaps and extreme avoidance behavior". The Thuringian Accident Insurance Fund as payers has so far taken over childcare costs for the victims in the amount of about 5.6 million Euros, including about 2.2 million Euros as pension payments, for example, for survivors' pensions.

Steinhäuser's last words – Für heute reicht's ("that's enough for today") – was also the title of a controversial book about the massacre written by Ines Geipel, who alleged that there were several mistakes made by the police on the case. Geipel, and relatives of some of the victims, criticized police for the initial speed of their response. The police had initially believed there was a second gunman, leading them to retake the school one level at a time rather than storm the entire building. Police laws and police training were reformed in most federal states in response to the shooting. While police patrols were previously required to wait for a special task force, police personnel all over Germany now get the necessary training and equipment to deal directly with mass shooters.

Heise was hailed as a national hero for locking Steinhäuser in a room, which ended the killing spree, but was later subject to backlash from some members of the public due to questions about his role. Erfurt Mayor Manfred Ruge said he fully believes Heise, but acknowledged the teacher's rather direct and animated style combined with the vast media coverage had caused resentment in the town.

The massacre led to the development of a code word that could be broadcast over the public address system to warn teachers of a shooting. "Mrs Koma is coming", which is "amok" spelled backwards, was later used at the Winnenden school shooting to alert teachers to that attack.

Steinhäuser was mentioned in a video created by Pekka-Eric Auvinen, who killed eight people during the Jokela school shooting in Finland.

== See also ==
- List of rampage killers (school massacres)
- List of school attacks in Germany
- Winnenden school shooting
- Emsdetten school shooting
- Ansbach school attack
