= Gymnasium Carolinum (Ansbach) =

Coordinates: 49°18′4.18″N 10°34′11.28″E

Gymnasium Carolinum Illustre
- Reuterstraße 9 Ansbach, 91522; Germany

Information
- School type: Gymnasium
- Founded: 1528; 498 years ago
- Website: www.gymnasium-carolinum.de

The Gymnasium Carolinum in Ansbach, Germany, was founded by George the Pious, Margrave of Brandenburg-Ansbach in Ansbach, the former Onolzbach, in 1528. It is reputedly the oldest and smallest of the three Gymnasiums in Ansbach. By the time it developed to the centre of education in the Ansbach ″Unterland". The school moved to its present building in 1736 which was planned as a prison in 1727, but changed to a Gymnasium in 1736. After the closure of the “Fürstenschule Heilsbronn“ the “Lateinschule“ (Latin school) of Ansbach was promoted to Gymnasium Carolinum Illustre (“Stiftungsbrief“ (letter of foundation) dated 1 May 1737). The Gymnasium was named after its patron, Karl Wilhelm Friedrich, Margrave of Brandenburg-Ansbach.

== Ansbach school attack ==
On 17 September 2009 the Ansbach school attack took place at the school. 16 people were injured, including the perpetrator. Two suffered life threatening injuries.
