= Winnenden =

- Town
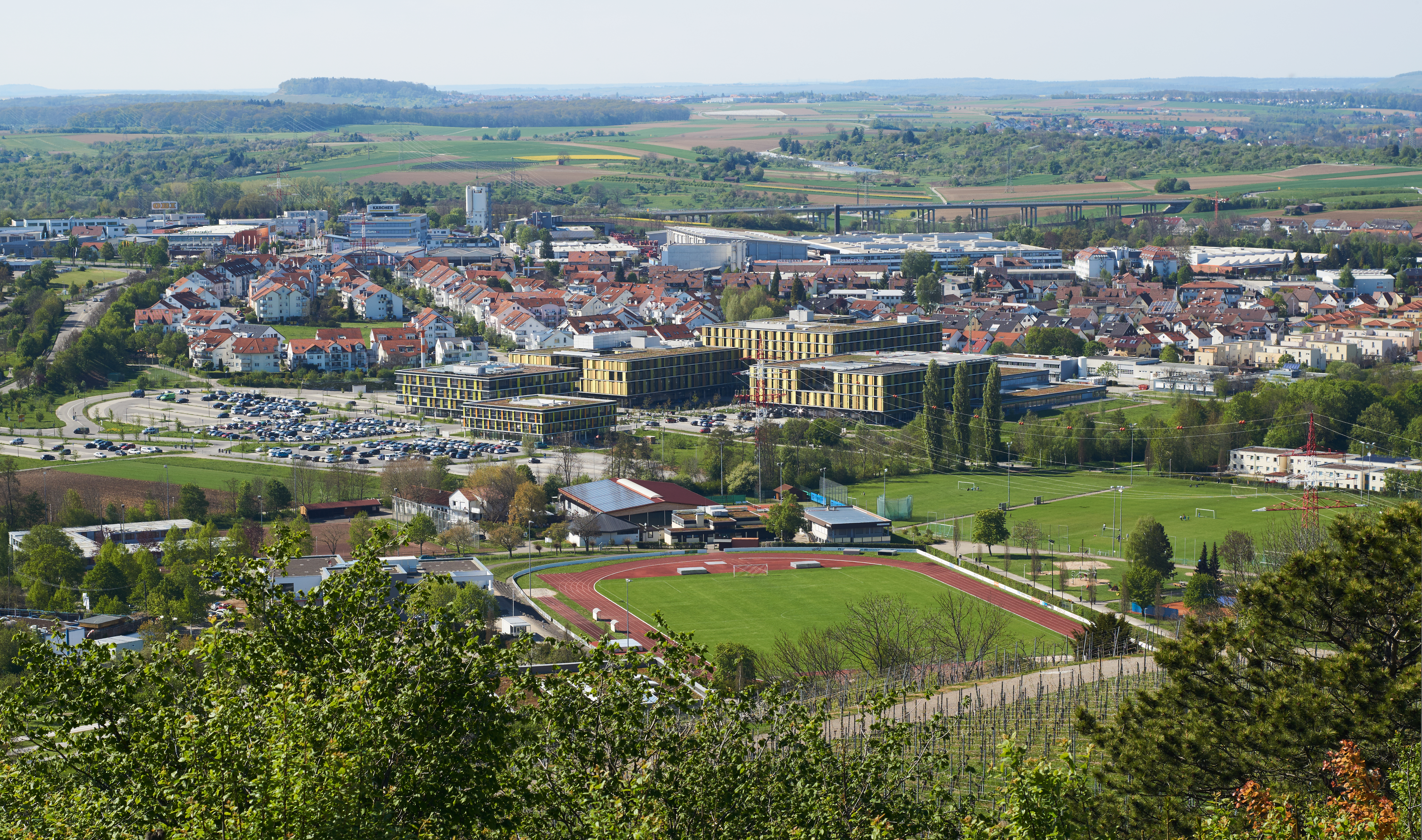
- Winnenden

- Coat of arms

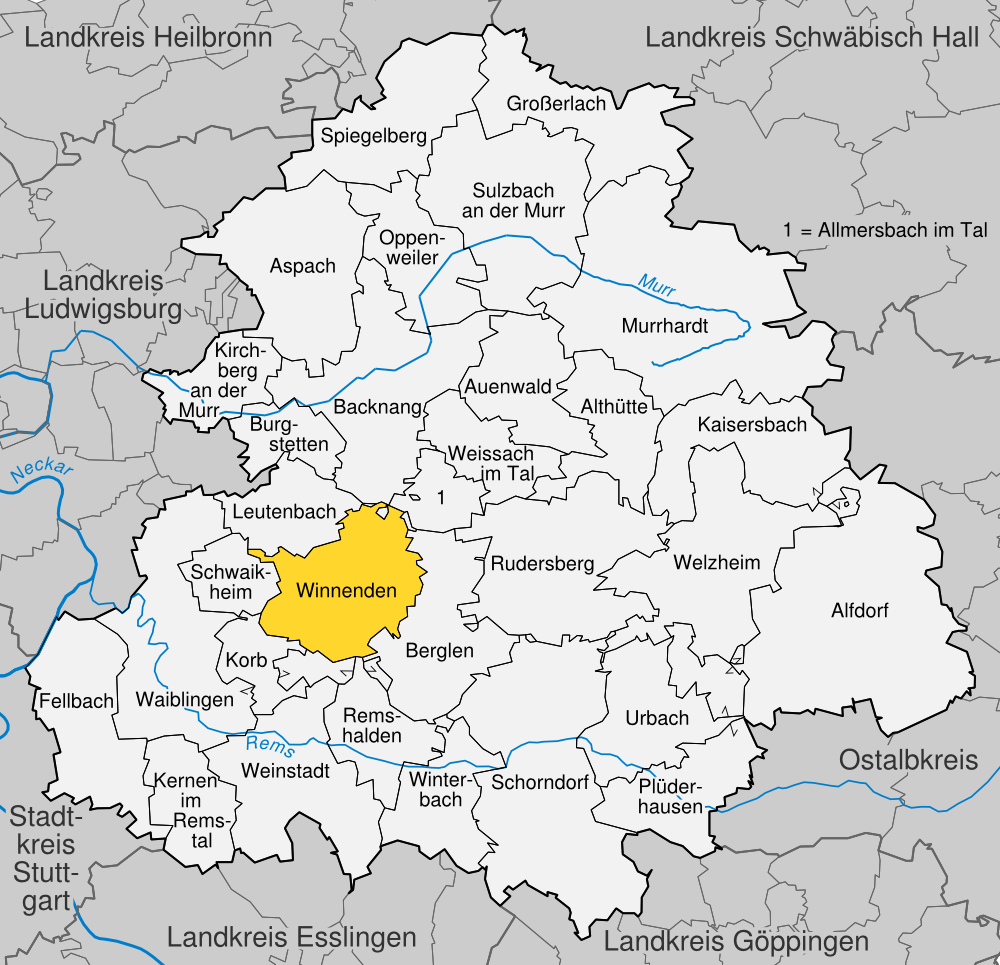
- Location of Winnenden within Rems-Murr-Kreis district
- Interactive map of Winnenden
- Location within Germany Location within Baden-Württemberg
- Coordinates: 48°52′35″N 09°23′52″E
- Country: Germany
- State: Baden-Württemberg
- Admin. region: Stuttgart
- District: Rems-Murr-Kreis
- Subdivisions: town center and 8 Quarters

Government
  - Mayor (2018–26): Hartmut Holzwarth (CDU)

Area
  - Total: 28.05 km^{2} (10.83 sq mi)
- Elevation: 292 m (958 ft)

Population (2025-12-31)
  - Total: 29,844
  - Density: 1,064/km^{2} (2,756/sq mi)
- Time zone: UTC+01:00 (CET)
  - Summer (DST): UTC+02:00 (CEST)
- Postal codes: 71349–71364
- Dialling codes: 07195
- Vehicle registration: WN
- Website: www.winnenden.de

Winnenden (German pronunciation: [ˈvɪnəndn̩]; Swabian: Wẽnnede) is a small town in the Rems-Murr district of the Stuttgart Region in Baden-Württemberg in southwest Germany. It lies in a wine-growing area approx. 20 km (12 mi) northeast of Stuttgart and has a population of fewer than 28,000. The town is home to the Kärcher Company, makers of cleaning equipment namely pressure washers.

== History ==
The earliest record of Winnenden is found in a document of 1181 where Gottfried of Schauenburg-Winnenden is mentioned as a witness testifying that Emperor Friedrich I held the castle in the town. Around 1200 the castle, which was then called Windin, came into the possession of Heinrich of Neuffen. In 1277 it was transferred to Konrad von Weinsberg. On 10 October 1325 the castle and town were sold to Württemberg.

In the German Peasants' War Winnenden was first under the control of the Armer Konrad or the peasants' army, but by 1519 it was under the control of the Swabian League. In 1616 an epidemic took the lives of approximately half of the population of Winnenden. During the Thirty Years' War the city was pillaged twice, in 1638 and 1643, and Imperial, French, and Swedish troops occasionally occupied Winnenden during this conflict. Around the same time the town's castle became the seat of the Württemberg-Winnental line of the House of Württemberg.

In March 2008, Winnenden and the nearby town of Backnang jointly hosted the World Individual Debating and Public Speaking Championships in cooperation with the German Debating Society. The competition was conducted at one of Winnenden's high schools, the Lessinggymnasium, and at a high school in Backnang, the Max-Borngymnasium.

== Politics ==
The following parties constitute the city council according to the 2004 municipal elections: the CDU (10 seats), voter Free Association (8), SPD (5), and Green Alternative List (3)

== 2009 school shooting incident ==
On 11 March 2009, the town made international headlines following a school shooting at the Albertville-Realschule, one of Winnenden's secondary schools. The gunman was a former pupil who opened fire without warning. The shooting resulted in the deaths of twelve people, and the attacker committed suicide at Wendlingen after killing three civilians. According to Heribert Rech, interior minister for Baden-Württemberg state, most of the victims at the school were female; eight female students, three female teachers, and one male student were killed in the school shooting.

== Breuningsweiler ==
Since 1972, Breuningsweiler is a village in Winnenden in Baden-Württemberg, Germany. Breuningsweiler has about 1000 inhabitants.

=== History ===
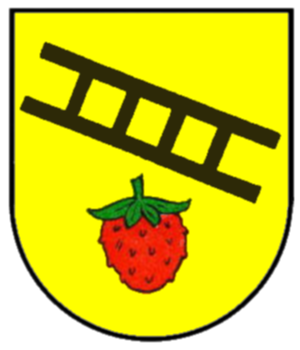
Arms of Breuningsweiler (in use until 1972)

- 1293 The village was first mentioned on 22 July 1293. At that time the abbey of Lorch agreed with Graf Eberhard to protect "Bruningswilar", as it was called then.
- 1443 the Schenkin of Winnenden inherited "Bruningswilar".
- 1542 15 families lived in Breuningsweiler.
- 1600 the village had 30 households with 150 people living there.
- 1829 the town hall was built.
- 1886 The fire department was founded.
- 1909 the "Brestling" (strawberry) was brought to Breuningsweiler. As a result, Breuningsweiler is also known as "Brestlingsweiler".
- 1911 Breuningsweiler got electricity.
- 1922/1923 The church was built.
- 1939 The census of population from 1939 showed that 293 people lived in Breuningsweiler.
- 1968 The fire department of Breuningsweiler acquired a fire engine.
- 1970 The gymnasium was built by the sports club.
- 1972 Breuningsweiler was suburbanized to Winnenden on 1 January 1972.
- 1973 The dedication of the new church.

== Twin towns – sister cities ==
Winnenden is twinned with:

- Albertville, France (1969)
- Santo Domingo de la Calzada, Spain (1993)

== Notable people ==
- Polykarp Leyser the Elder (1552–1610), a Lutheran theologian, superintendent of Braunschweig
- Johann Albrecht Bengel (1687–1752), known as Bengelius, a Lutheran pietist clergyman and Greek-language scholar
- John Eppinger (1730–1776), master builder, an American Revolutionary War patriot in Savannah, Georgia
- Johann Gottlieb Christaller (1827–1895), missionary, clergyman, ethnolinguist, translator and philologist; known as the "founder of scientific linguistic research in West Africa".
