= List of attacks related to post-secondary schools =

This is a list of attacks related to post-secondary schools, such as universities or colleges. These are attacks that occurred on school property, faculty or related primarily to school issues or events. A narrow definition of the word attacks is used for this list, excluding warfare, robberies, gang violence, political or police attacks, (as related to protests), accidents, single suicides, and murder-suicides resulting from rejected suitors/spouses. Incidents that involved only staff who work at the school have been classified as belonging at List of workplace killings. It also excludes events where no injuries take place, if an attack is foiled. Each account needs a valid reliable source or it may be deleted.

== College and university school incidents ==
=== 1800–1999 ===
Date	Location	Country	Attackers	Dead	Injured	Total (Note: Including death or injury of attacker(s), when applicable.)	Incident Description
April 16, 1874	Lebanon, Tennessee	United States	John L. Anderson	1	0	1	John R. Breckinridge, son of the late Robert Jefferson Breckinridge, was shot to death at the Law school in Lebanon, Tennessee, by John L. Anderson, the Mayor's son, who was reportedly "crazed with liquor".
October 10, 1892	Kansas City, Kansas	United States	Fred Basset	0	2	2	At the University of Kansas, two students, E. Higgins and Jack Craycroft, were shot after football practice while cutting through property owned by law student, Fred Basset. Basset said they were warned not to trespass on his farm.
June 7, 1925	Baton Rouge, Louisiana	United States		1	0	1	Oscar B. Turner, a professor of agronomy, was murdered by an axe-wielding assailant on the campus of Louisiana State University.
June 4, 1930	Cambridge	United Kingdom	Douglas Newton Potts, 19	3 (Note: Including the perpetrator)	0	3	Student Douglas Potts shot dead Dr. Alexander Wollaston and Detective Sergeant Willis at King's College before committing suicide.
June 4, 1936	Bethlehem, Pennsylvania	United States	Wesley Crow	2	0	2	Wesley Clow shot and killed his Lehigh University English instructor, C. Wesley Phy. Clow went to Phy's office and demanded that Phy change his grade to a passing mark. Clow committed suicide after shooting Phy.
November 13, 1949	Columbus, Ohio	United States	James Heer	1	0	1	Ohio State University freshman James Heer of Euclid, Ohio grabbed a handgun from the room of a Delta Tau Delta fraternity brother and shot and killed Jack McKeown, 21, of Norwood, Ohio, an Ohio State senior and fraternity brother.
July 14, 1952	New York City, New York	United States	Bayard Peakes	1	0	1	Bayard Peakes shot and killed secretary Eileen Fahey with a pistol at the office of American Physical Society at Columbia University. Peakes was reportedly upset that the APS had rejected a pamphlet he had written.
May 15, 1954	Chapel Hill, North Carolina	United States	?	1	2	3	Putnam Davis Jr. was shot and killed during a fraternity house carnival at the Phi Delta Theta house at the University of North Carolina. William Joyner and Allen Long were also shot and wounded during the exchange of gunfire in their fraternity bedroom. The incident took place after an all-night beer party.
January 11, 1955	Swarthmore, Pennsylvania	United States	Robert Bechtel, 20	1	0	1	After some of his dorm mates urinated on his mattress, Bob Bechtel, a 20-year-old student at Swarthmore College, used a shotgun to kill fellow student Holmes Strozier.
January 6, 1957	Reykjavík	Iceland	Sigurbjörn Ingi Þorvaldsson, 25	1	0	1	25-year-old Sigurbjörn Ingi Þorvaldsson shot and killed 19-year-old Konkordía Jónatansdóttir with a rifle at Garðyrkjuskólanum.
August 1, 1966	Austin, Texas	United States	Charles Whitman, 25	18	31	49	University of Texas tower shooting. After killing his wife and mother, Charles Whitman used a rifle and shot from the observation deck of the University of Texas at Austin's Tower; he killed 15 people and wounded 31 others before being shot dead by police.
November 12, 1966	Mesa, Arizona	United States	Robert Benjamin Smith, 18	5	2	7	1966 Rose-Mar College of Beauty shooting: Robert Benjamin Smith, 18, took seven people hostage at Rose-Mar College of Beauty. Smith ordered the hostages to lie down on the floor in a circle. He shot them in the head with a pistol. Four women and a three-year-old girl died, one woman and a baby were injured but survived. Police arrested Smith after the massacre. Smith had reportedly admired Richard Speck and Charles Whitman.
January 7, 1969	Cambridge, Massachusetts	United States	?	1	0	1	23-year-old anthropology graduate student, Jane S. Britton was beaten to death in her 6 University Road apartment at Harvard University in Cambridge, Massachusetts. She was the daughter of Radcliffe Administrative Vice President J. Boyd Britton. Her killer has never been apprehended.
August 24, 1969	Alor Akar	Malaysia	Jimmy Johnny, 23	3	2	5	A 23-year-old teacher at a vocational school in Alor Akar, Kuantan attacked several sleeping students in the school hostel. He killed three students and wounded two others, one of them critically, with a dagger. The teacher surrendered and was later arrested by police.
November 28, 1969	State College, Pennsylvania	United States	?	1	0	1	22-year-old graduate student Betsy Aardsma was stabbed to death in the Pattee Library at the Pennsylvania State University in State College, Pennsylvania. Her killer was never apprehended.
August 24, 1970	Madison, Wisconsin	United States	Karleton Armstrong, Dwight Armstrong, David Fine and Leo Burt	1	3	4	A group of anti-Vietnam War activists detonated a truck bomb outside of University of Wisconsin–Madison. Physics teacher Robert Fassnacht was killed and three others were injured.
November 11, 1971	Spokane, Washington	United States	Larry J. Harmon, 21	2	4	6	Former MIT student Larry J. Harmon, 21, entered St. Aloysius Roman Catholic Church on the Gonzaga University campus armed with a rifle. Harmon killed the caretaker, 68-year-old Hilary Kunz, and wounded four more people before police officers shot and killed him.
November 13, 1971	Villa Nueva, Guatemala	Guatemala	Basilio Martínez Ávila	2	15	17	A 21-year-old Basilio Martínez Ávila killed two people with a machete at an agricultural school near Guatemala City. He wounded 15 others before being overpowered by other students.
October 12, 1974	Stanford, California	United States	Stephen Blake Crawford	1	0	1	19-year-old Arlis Perry was stabbed to death with an ice pick in Stanford Memorial Church on the grounds of Stanford University by Crawford, a campus security guard.
December 24, 1974	Sofia	Bulgaria	Branimir Donchev, 17	6	10	16	6 students were killed and 10 others wounded, among them several foreign students, when 17-year-old Branimir Donchev began shooting with a pistol in a university hostel in Sofia. Donchev was subdued and arrested by police.
February 17, 1976	Beirut	Lebanon	Najim Najim	3	1	4	Robert Najemy and Raymond Ghosn, two deans at the American University of Beirut, were shot and killed by former student Najim Najim, who had been expelled for radical activity. Najim took six people hostage, and threatened to kill the hostages and himself with hand grenades. Three hours later he surrendered to police. When Najim was led out of the building he was shot and wounded by Joseph Cherbeka, a friend of dean Ghosn.
February 19, 1976	Los Angeles, California	United States	Neil Jordan Liebeskind, 18	1	8	9	Computer Learning Center shooting: During a test Neil Liebeskind, a student at a Los Angeles computer school, opened fire at his fellow students with a shotgun, killing Fernando E. Alcivar, 24, and wounding several others. Alcivar was sitting next to the intended target. When trying to escape, Liebeskind was apprehended by Howard Barnes, a security guard. Told to drop his gun, Liebeskind fired at Barnes, hitting him; Barnes returned fire, critically wounding the shooter.
July 12, 1976	Fullerton, California	United States	Edward Allaway, 37	7	2	9	California State University, Fullerton massacre: A janitor at California State University, Fullerton killed seven people before being arrested. The perpetrator was sent to a mental facility.
May 19, 1977	Leningrad	Soviet Union	Anatoly Fedorenko	6	3	9	Anatoly Fedorenko killed six cadets and wounded two. He was also injured by one of the fatally wounded cadets. Sentenced to death.
January 15, 1978	Tallahassee, Florida	United States	Theodore Bundy, 31	2	2	4	Theodore Bundy entered the Florida State University Chi Omega sorority house at approximately 3 a.m. and killed two sleeping women, Lisa Levy and Margaret Bowman. He also bludgeoned two other Chi Omegas, Karen Chandler and Kathy Kleiner. Bundy was a serial killer and had killed several other women before this event.
August 18, 1978	Stanford, California	United States	Theodore Streleski, 42	1	0	1	Theodore Streleski murdered his mathematics professor, Karel deLeeuw at Stanford University by bludgeoning him with a ball-peen hammer. He was found to have a hit list containing deLeeuw's name.
October 6, 1979	Columbia, South Carolina	United States	Mark Houston, 19	2	5	7	Mark Houston opened fire inside a dormitory during a party at the University of South Carolina, killing two partygoers and injuring five.
March 26, 1980	Big Rapids, Michigan	United States	Thomas Kakonis, 20	1	0	1	Robert Brauer, Business Professor, was shot to death by student Thomas Kakonis, 20, at Ferris State College. Robert Brauer had failed Kakonis on an examination. Kakonis was the son of an associate dean at the college.
April 17, 1981	Ann Arbor, Michigan	United States	Leo Kelly, 22	2	0	2	Psychology Major Leo Kelly set off several Molotov cocktails into the hallway of Bursley Residence Hall at the University of Michigan in Ann Arbor, setting off the fire alarm. He shot at fleeing residents with a shotgun, fatally wounding two persons. Kelly was found guilty on two murder counts, and was sentenced to life in prison.
December 17, 1983	Ithaca, New York	United States	Su Yong Kim	2	0	2	Non-student Su Yong Kim entered the Low Rise 7 dormitory and killed Cornell University first-year women Young Hee Suh and Erin Nieswand with a rifle.
August 12, 1985	New York City, New York	United States	Van Anthony Hull, 29	1	4	5	Student Van Hull shot one person dead, injured another four at the New York City Technical College and kept police at bay for about an hour, before being taken into custody. The shooting was said to be related to a dispute over financial aid.
September 8, 1986	New Orleans, Louisiana	United States	Cindy Marie Piccot, 21	2	0	2	Cindy Marie Piccot entered the Coastal Training Institute and shot dead 20-year-old student Shamette Allen with a .38 caliber pistol before committing suicide. The motive for the shooting was revenge for an earlier attack in which Shamette Allen set Cindy Marie Piccot on fire.
February 4, 1987	Northridge, California	United States	Fawwaz Abdin, 25	2	0	2	Associate professor of computer science at California State University, Northridge, Djamshid Asgari, was confronted in a stairwell in the Engineering Building by a graduate student, Fawwaz Abdin, 25. Abdin was angry over a grade Dr. Asgari had given him a year earlier, putting him on academic probation. He demanded the grade be changed, Dr. Asgari refused, and Abdin shot him twice and then killed himself. Dr. Asgari later died at the Northridge Hospital.
December 6, 1989	Montreal, Quebec	Canada	Marc Lépine, 25	15	14	29	École Polytechnique massacre. Marc Lépine took a hunting rifle into École Polytechnique de Montréal, shooting nine women and killing six in one room. He went through the school, killing 14 women and injuring 4 men and 10 women before turning the gun on himself. It was the worst mass murder event in Canadian history, up until the 2020 Nova Scotia Shooting
November 27, 1990	Heraklion, Crete	Greece	Giorgos Petrodaskalakis, 32	3	0	3	Theoretical physicist Basilis C. Xanthopoulos and his colleague Stephanos Pnevmatikos were shot to death by 32-year-old post-graduate student Giorgos Petrodaskalakis at the University of Crete. He then committed suicide.
November 1, 1991	Iowa City, Iowa	United States	Gang Lu, 28	6	1	7	University of Iowa shooting: After his dissertation did not win a certain academic award, Ph.D. physics student Gang Lu shot six people before committing suicide. Five were killed, including three professors. A student employee was paralyzed.
December 14, 1992	Great Barrington, Massachusetts	United States	Wayne Lo, 18	2	4	6	1992 Bard College at Simon's Rock shooting: An 18-year-old student at Bard College at Simon's Rock, Taiwanese-born Wayne Lo, opened fire at the schools campus. He killed one student, one professor, and wounded four other people. He was apprehended by police and sentenced to life in prison without parole for the homicides.
July 8, 1993	Ogden, Utah	United States	Mark Duong, 28	1	3	4	28-year-old student Mark Duong shot and injured three people, one of them a Weber State police officer, at a grievance hearing at Weber State University. Doung was shot by the police officer and died at the scene.
April 5, 1994	Aarhus	Denmark	Flemming Nielsen, 35	3	2	5	35-year-old Flemming Nielsen, a student at Aarhus University, entered the cafeteria of the university armed with a shotgun. He shot and killed two female students and wounded two others. Soon afterward he went to the men's room and committed suicide.
December 8, 1994	Quezon City	Philippines		1	0	1	Dennis Venturina, of Sigma Rho, was beaten to death by members of Scintilla Juris, a rival fraternity, on the campus of the University of the Philippines.
May 28, 1995	Cambridge, Massachusetts	United States	Sinedu Tadesse, 20	2	1	3	Sinedu Tadesse stabbed her roommate, 20-year-old Trang Phuong Ho, to death with a hunting knife inside a dormitory at Harvard University. Tadesse also attacked one of Ho's visiting friends, 26-year-old Thao Nguyen, severely injuring her as well. Tadesse hanged herself.
August 15, 1996	San Diego, California	United States	Frederick M. Davidson, 36	3	0	3	San Diego State University shooting. Frederick M. Davidson, shot Dr. Chen Liang, Dr. Constantinos Lyrintzis, and Dr. D. Preston Lowrey during a meeting at which he was to defend his master's thesis. He pleaded guilty to three counts of murder and is serving a life term in state prison.
August 26, 1996	San Antonio, Texas	United States	Gregory Heath Tidwell, 25	2	0	2	25-year-old Gregory Heath Tidwell stormed into the John Peace Library at the University of Texas at San Antonio on the first day of fall classes, shooting 54-year-old Stephen Sorenson four times, killing him. Tidwell then turned the weapon upon himself and committed suicide.
September 17, 1996	State College, Pennsylvania	United States	Jillian Robbins, 19	1	2	3	Jillian Robbins fired five rounds with a hunting rifle and attacked with a knife the student who disarmed her. She was convicted of third degree murder and four counts of attempted murder.
March 8, 1997	Kamyshin	Russia	Sergei Lepnev, 18	6	2	8	Kamyshin school shooting: first year cadet Sergei Lepnev of the Russian Military School opened fire on his commander and classmates, killing six and wounding two.
February 19, 1999	Quezon City	Philippines		1	0	1	Niño Calinao, a senior journalism major at the University of the Philippines was shot dead by suspected UP Sigma Rho members after being mistaken for a member of a rival fraternity.

=== 2000–2009 ===
Date	Location	Country	Attackers	Dead	Injured	Total	Incident Description
February 10, 2000	Quezon City	Philippines		1	0	1	Den Daniel Reyes was stabbed to death during a fight between two rival fraternities at the University of the Philippines.
August 28, 2000	Fayetteville, Arkansas	United States	James Easton Kelley	2	0	2	James Easton Kelley shot and killed professor John Locke in his office at the University of Arkansas before committing suicide.
September 28, 2000 and February 3, 2001	Washington, District of Columbia	United States	Joseph Mesa Jr., 20	2	0	2	19-year-old Eric Franklin Plunkett was found beaten to death inside his dorm room at Gallaudet University in September 2000. In February 2001, 19-year-old Benjamin Varner, an RA in the same dorm, was found stabbed to death. Authorities prosecuted Joseph Mesa Jr., who was found guilty of two counts of first-degree murder.
January 19, 2001	Toronto, Ontario	Canada		1	0	1	Professor David Buller, 50, was stabbed to death outside his office at the University of Toronto by an unknown assailant.
December 16, 2001	Kluczbork	Poland	Kazimierz J., 62	3	0	3	62-year-old retired teacher, former principal of another school, and hunter Kazimierz J. during a break in the third class of the Private Post-Secondary School of Economics in Kluczbork at the Vocational School Complex No. 1 named after Maria Skłodowska-Curie spoke with his 42-year-old wife Joanna J., who was in the same group although they did not sit together, an argument broke out between them, and around 10:45 a.m. Kazimierz J. drew a kniejówka and fatally shot his wife in the left thigh, then ran out of the school, went to his car, and fired twice at 37-year-old railway worker Marek Laszczyński, who had tried to help her, and he died at the scene, after that Kazimierz got out of the car in the school courtyard and committed suicide by shooting himself in the head, the investigation determined that the motive was unfounded jealousy as Kazimierz suspected Laszczyński of having an affair with his wife, however it turned out that nothing connected them other than friendship.
January 16, 2002	Grundy, Virginia	United States	Peter Odighizuwa, 43	3	3	6	Appalachian School of Law shooting. Odighizuwa, a native-born Nigerian and former student at the Appalachian School of Law, shot and killed its dean, a professor, and a student and wounded three other students. After running out of ammunition, he was tackled and subdued by a student. He pleaded guilty to murder charges and received multiple life sentences.
October 21, 2002	Melbourne	Australia	Huan Xiang	2	5	7	Monash University shooting. Huan Xiang, a commerce student at the university, armed with five loaded handguns, opened fire in a tutorial room. He killed two students, William Wu and Steven Chan, and seriously wounded five others. Xiang was found not guilty of murder due to mental illness, and was ordered committed to a psychiatric hospital.
October 28, 2002	Tucson, Arizona	United States	Robert Stewart Flores, 41	4	0	3	2002 University of Arizona shooting. Robert Stewart Flores shot and killed three of his nursing professors at the University of Arizona.
September 13, 2003	Nanning	China		0	8	8	A female student, who was suspended for one year after trying to commit suicide, stabbed eight classmates in a dormitory at Guangxi Teachers' College. Three of the victims were critically injured.
February 4, 2004	Remanso	Brazil		2	3	5	A 17-year-old youth shot and killed 13-year-old Farlley Bastos Almeida, who had previously ridiculed him, and then forced a taxi driver to take him to a nearby EDP school. There he shot and killed 23-year-old Ana Paula Feitosa de Almeida and wounded two others before being subdued by two students. A woman, afraid of getting shot, jumped out of a window in the third floor and broke her legs. In custody the youth stated that he sympathized with Islamic terrorists and had intended to kill at least a hundred people.
Feb. 13–15, 2004	Kunming	China	Ma Jiajue, 23	4	0	4	Biochemistry student Ma Jiajue stabbed four other students to death in a dormitory at Yunnan University. He was found guilty of murder and executed on June 17, 2004, via firing squad.
December 28, 2005	Bangalore	India	Unknown gunmen	1	4	5	2005 Indian Institute of Science shooting. Prof. Munish Chandra Puri was killed and four others injured after two or more unidentified gunmen opened fire at the Indian Institute of Science.
September 13, 2006	Montreal, Quebec	Canada	Kimveer Gill, 25	2	19	21	2006 Dawson College shooting. Kimveer Gill had opened fire at Dawson College, near downtown Montreal. One victim (Anastasia De Sousa) died later in the next day at the hospital due to her serious injuries, while another 19 were injured, eight of whom were listed in critical condition, with six requiring surgery. The gunman later committed suicide.
February 26, 2007	Encarnación	Paraguay	Orlando Giménez Ruíz Díaz, 33	0	1	1	Engineering student Orlando Giménez Ruíz Díaz, 33-years-old, seriously wounded his professor Daniel Mlot, 27-years-old, with three shots from a firearm during his mathematics class at the National University of Itapúa in front of more than seventy students. He planned to shoot more, but when the gun failed him, he fled and then ended up presenting himself at the Ka'aguy Rory neighborhood police station.
April 16, 2007	Blacksburg, Virginia	United States	Seung-Hui Cho, 23	33	25	58	Virginia Tech massacre. Cho, a senior English-studies major, killed 32 people (27 students and 5 faculty members) on the campus of Virginia Polytechnic Institute and State University in two separate incidents, about two hours apart. Another 25 people were injured at Norris, some when they jumped from second-story windows to escape. Cho committed suicide after police breached the main entrance doors.
May 8, 2007	Bundoora, Victoria	Australia	Sarah Jean Cheney, 23	0	1	1	Sarah Jean Cheney stabbed Jemma Clancy, a 27-year-old behavioral science student, three times with a steak knife. The incident occurred in the Borchardt library at the Bundoora campus of La Trobe University. Sarah Jean Cheney did not know Jemma Clancy personally and expressed that she just desired to kill someone. Jemma Clancy was taken to hospital in a serious but stable condition.
December 9, 2007	Arvada, Colorado	United States	Matthew J. Murray, 24	5	5	10	Matthew J. Murray attacked the Youth With A Mission missionary training school in Arvada, Colorado, killing two and wounding two others. He drove to the New Life Church in Colorado Springs, Colorado where he killed two more people and wounded three before being shot by a security guard. Murray then committed suicide.
February 8, 2008	Baton Rouge, Louisiana	United States	Latina Williams, 23	3	0	3	Louisiana Technical College shooting: At around 8:30 a.m. 23-year-old Latina Williams entered her nursing class of about 20 students on the second-floor of a building on the campus of Louisiana Technical College, in Baton Rouge. She briefly entered the class, spoke with the professor, and then left. She then soon returned through a different door, and opened fire after entering, shooting six rounds, then reloading and committing suicide by shooting herself in the head. Two students were killed in the shooting. The shooting was random and not targeted, with no definitive reason having been found. William's family had noticed no strange behaviour in their last interactions with her, although police investigation found evidence she was exhibiting signs of paranoia and losing touch with reality. In the time before the shooting, Williams had also been living out of her car, had given away or sold all of her possessions, and had called a suicide hotline earlier that morning and had said her intention of committing suicide.
February 14, 2008	DeKalb, Illinois	United States	Steven Phillip Kazmierczak, 27	6	21	27	Northern Illinois University shooting. 27-year-old former student Steven Kazmierczak opened fire with a shotgun and three semi-automatic handguns at Cole Hall on the campus of Northern Illinois University, in DeKalb, killing 5 students and wounding 20 other students and the class instructor. 17 of the injuries were gunshot-related, while other persons were injured escaping the scene. Kazmierczak then fatally shot himself.
September 23, 2008	Kauhajoki	Finland	Matti Juhani Saari, 22	11	1	12	Kauhajoki school shooting. 22-year-old culinary arts student Matti Saari opened fire at the Kauhajoki School of Hospitality of Seinäjoki University of Applied Sciences, in Kauhajoki, Finland, using a pistol. Nine students and a teacher died in the shooting, and he set their bodies and school property on fire. Saari then shot himself in the head, later dying at Tampere University Hospital.
October 26, 2008	Conway, Arkansas	United States	Kawin Brockman, 19; Kelcey Perry, 19; Mario Toney, 20, and Brandon Wade, 20	2	1	3	2008 University of Central Arkansas shooting. A shooting took place on the campus of University of Central Arkansas, in Conway, outside the Arkansas Hall dormitory. Two students—Ryan Henderson, 18, and Chavares Block, 19—were both fatally shot. A third person, a 19-year-old campus visitor, was shot and wounded in the leg.
February 7, 2009	Houston, Texas	United States	Jeremy Lee Pierce, 32	1	0	1	Jeremy Lee Pierce, a 32-year-old student at University of Houston, fatally shot Joe Tall, a 47-year-old homeless man, at the campus bus stop. Pierce has been charged with murder.
March 2, 2009	Nanyang Avenue	Singapore	David Hartanto Widjaja, 21	1	1	2	Nanyang Technological University Professor Chan Kap Luk was stabbed in the arm and back in his office by David Hartanto Widjaja. Widjaja then slit his wrists and jumped off the five-story engineering building where he died. Professor Luk was taken to the National University Hospital and treated.
April 2, 2009	Radford, Virginia	United States	Phillip Eugene Beale Sr., 42;	1	0	1	Phillip Beale and an unidentified individual murdered a drug dealer near the campus of Radford University after arguing with him. Radford police arrested Beale and are seeking to identify his accomplice.
April 9, 2009	Agios Ioannis Rentis, Athens	Greece	Dimitris Patmanidis, 19	1	3	4	OAED Vocational College shooting. Dimitris Patmanidis, a 19-year-old car electronics student at the Manpower Employment Organisation of Greece (OAED), a vocational college in a suburb of Athens, Greece, went to school armed with two pistols and a knife. Patmanidis critically shot an 18-year-old student; shot two pedestrians, and fled to a park where he committed suicide. This school shooting is one of the first ever to occur in Greece.
April 26, 2009	Hampton, Virginia	United States	Odane Maye, 18	0	3	3	Odane Maye, an 18-year-old former student, entered Hampton University while armed with three handguns. Maye stalked a pizza delivery man, whom he shot at a dormitory. Maye next shot the dorm manager, and last himself in a suicide attempt; both victims survived. Maye was arrested three days later after being hospitalized and was arraigned the next day on seven counts—aggravated malicious wounding and various firearms offenses.
April 28, 2009	Richmond, Virginia	United States		2	0	2	Two students at Virginia Union University were stabbed. Police say the suspect, whose name has not been released, is not a VUU student.
April 30, 2009	Baku	Azerbaijan	Farda Gadirov, 28	13	10	23	Azerbaijan State Oil Academy shootings. Farda Gadirov, a 28-year-old Georgian citizen, opened fire with a semi-automatic pistol at the Azerbaijan State Oil Academy, in Baku. Seven students and five faculty members were killed, another 10 were injured. Gadirov committed suicide after the attack.
May 18, 2009	Cambridge, Massachusetts	United States	Jabrai Jordan Copney, 20; Jason Aquino, 23; Blayn Jiggetts, 19	1	0	1	Justin Cosby, 21, of Cambridge, was invited into a Harvard dormitory to sell the suspects marijuana. They tried to rob him, then shot him. Copney turned himself in four days later. Copney was convicted of murder. His girlfriend, Brittany Smith '09, 21, pleaded guilty to assisting after the fact, firearm possession and misleading a grand jury. Jiggetts pleaded guilty to manslaughter, armed robbery and firearm possession; Aquino to manslaughter, armed robbery and misleading a grand jury.
September 2, 2009	San Bruno, California	United States	Germaine Benjamin, 18; Dimaryea McGhee, 20; Jacori Bender, 18	0	1	1	A student was shot after an argument escalated between two groups of young males in the parking lot of Skyline College, in San Bruno, a suburb of San Francisco, California. Police arrested three suspects on September 3.
October 8, 2009	Los Angeles, California	United States	Damon Thompson, 20	0	1	1	A 20-year-old female student of a chemistry laboratory at the University of California, Los Angeles was stabbed multiple times, including having her throat slashed, during class. A teaching assistant stopped the bleeding and called for help. The victim was transported to the hospital and needed surgery but was expected to recover. Police arrested Damon Thompson after the attack.
October 18, 2009	Storrs, Connecticut	United States	John William Lomax III, 21	1	0	1	Jasper Howard, a 20-year-old cornerback for the UConn Huskies, was stabbed to death on the campus of the University of Connecticut, outside the Student Union Center. On October 21, police arrested John William Lomax III, 21, and charged him with murder. Three other men were also arrested in connection with the murder.
November 26, 2009	Pécs	Hungary	Gere Akos, 23	1	3	4	A 23-year-old pharmacology student at the University of Pécs opened fire inside the biophysics research institute at the university. A 19-year-old student was killed and a student, a teacher, and a cleaning woman were wounded in the shooting. The gunman was arrested by police about one hour after the attack.
December 4, 2009	Vestal, New York	United States	Abdulsalam S. al-Zahrani, 46	1	0	1	Richard T. Antoun, 77, a professor of anthropology and specialist in Islamic and Middle Eastern studies, was stabbed to death inside his office at Binghamton University. Police arrested 46-year-old graduate student Abdulsalam S. al-Zahrani and charged him with second-degree murder. Al-Zahrani pleaded guilty to the lesser charge of first-degree manslaughter and was sentenced to 15 years in prison. After al-Zahrani is released, he will be deported to his native Saudi Arabia.

=== 2010–2019 ===
Date	Location	Country	Attackers	Dead	Injured	Total	Incident Description
January 13, 2010	Perpignan	France	Qing Ye, 26	1	3	4	A 26-year-old Chinese sociology student named Qing Ye killed a secretary and wounded three teachers with a knife at the University of Perpignan. The student was arrested by police.
May 18, 2010	Hainan	China	?	0	10	10	A group of men armed with knives attacked college students at the Hainan Institute of Science and Technology after disabling a security camera and stabbing a guard. They attacked students at random in a dormitory, injuring nine. Three of the attackers were arrested.
October 3, 2010	Elizabeth City, North Carolina	United States	Christopher David Amyx, 23	1	0	1	Jonathan Schipper, a student at Mid-Atlantic Christian University was shot to death inside Pearl A. Presley Hall, a campus dormitory. Police arrested 23-year-old student Christopher David Amyx after the shooting and charged him with first-degree murder. Amyx had claimed self-defense, saying 23-year-old Schipper came at him with a knife while he was sitting at his computer. Amyx testified he felt he was in danger because he was a gay student at a religious school.
February 6, 2011	Youngstown, Ohio	United States	Columbus E. Jones Jr., 22; Braylon L. Rogers, 19	1	11	12	Two men opened fire inside a fraternity house where a party was taking place at Youngstown State University. Jamail E. Johnson, a 25-year-old student, died and eleven people were injured, including six students. Two men were arrested on charges of aggravated murder.
August 8, 2011	Atizapán de Zaragoza	Mexico	?	0	2	2	A homemade bomb explodes at Monterrey Institute of Technology and Higher Education, Estado de México Campus in Atizapán de Zaragoza. The bomb was sent to a professor of robotics, who was injured along with a university guard.
April 2, 2012	Oakland, California	United States	One L. Goh, 43 (charged)	7	3	10	2012 Oikos University shooting: One L. Goh allegedly shot ten people at Oikos University; seven of whom died and another three were injured. He is facing murder and attempted murder charges.
June 15, 2012	Edmonton, Alberta	Canada	Travis Brandon Baumgartner, 21	3	1	4	While restocking bank machines at the University of Alberta's HUB Mall, three G4S crew members, Michelle Shegelski, Brian Ilesic, and Eddie Rejano, were shot and killed by another crew member, Travis Brandon Baumgartner. A fourth, Matthew Schuman, was seriously injured, but survived. Baumgartner was arrested on June 16, while attempting to cross into the U.S. at the Aldergrove, British Columbia-Lynden, Washington border. He was sentenced to life in prison, with no chance of parole for 40 years.
October 31, 2012	Los Angeles, California	United States	Brandon Spencer, 20 (charged)	0	4	4	At a Halloween party on the University of Southern California campus, an argument escalated and a man shot Geno Hall seven times with a handgun, critically wounding him. He shot and wounded three other people, who were not students of USC. Brandon Spencer, 20, was arrested for the shooting. He is charged with attempted murder.
November 30, 2012	Casper, Wyoming	United States	Christopher Krumm, 25	3	0	3	Christopher Krumm fatally shot his father with a bow and arrow at Casper College; he fatally stabbed one female professor near her home, and stabbed himself to death at the college.
December 20, 2012	Hanoi	Vietnam	?	1	0	1	A 20-year-old student was stabbed to death at Ha Noi University of Business and Technology.
January 15, 2013	Aleppo	Syria	?	82	160	242	Missile strikes by either Syrian rebel or government forces hit the University of Aleppo on the first day of exams.
January 15, 2013	St. Louis, Missouri	United States	Sean Johnson (charged)	0	2	2	A gunman shot an administrator in his office on the fourth floor of Stevens Institute of Business and Arts, wounding him. The suspected gunman, Sean Johnson, a part-time student, shot and wounded himself on a stairwell. Both the administrator and Johnson were hospitalized in stable conditions. Johnson was charged with three felony charges, including assault.
January 15, 2013	Hazard, Kentucky	United States	Dalton Lee Stidham, 21 (charged)	3	0	3	Two people were shot and killed and a third person was wounded at the parking lot of Hazard Community and Technical College. The third victim, 12-year-old Taylor Cornett, died from her wounds the next day. 21-year-old Dalton Lee Stidham was arrested and charged with three counts of murder.
January 16, 2013	Chicago, Illinois	United States	?	1	0	1	A 17-year-old boy, Tyrone Lawson, was shot to death in a parking lot of Chicago State University after high school basketball games were being held on the university campus. Police arrested two people after the shooting and recovered a weapon.
January 22, 2013	Houston, Texas	United States	?	0	3	3	Between the Library and Academic Building outside of Lone Star College–North Harris, two men got into an argument: one shot the other man, a student, injuring him. A maintenance man suffered a gunshot wound to the leg. The gunman accidentally shot himself in the leg. After the shooting, the gunman fled into the woods and was arrested hours later. A man was arrested.
April 9, 2013	Cypress, Texas	United States	Dylan Andrew Quick, 20 (charged)	0	14	14	During a stabbing attack at the campus of Lone Star College-CyFair, 14 students were injured, 2 critically. The suspect, Dylan Quick, a student, was subdued by students and arrested, charged with three counts of aggravated assault with a deadly weapon.
April 12, 2013	Christiansburg, Virginia	United States	Neil Allen MacInnis, 19 (charged)	0	2	2	Two women were wounded during a shooting at the campus of New River Community College. Neil Allen MacInnis was taken into custody.
April 16, 2013	Grambling, Louisiana	United States	Jaylin M. Wayne	0	3	3	Three students were shot and injured on the campus of Grambling State University.
June 7, 2013	Santa Monica, California	United States	John S. Zawahri, 23	6	4	10	2013 Santa Monica shootings. Zawahri killed five people and wounded four during a shooting spree throughout the city. He killed his brother and father at their home, then set it on fire. He wounded a female driver while trying to hijack her car, then forced another to drive him to Santa Monica College. Along the way he shot at a city bus, wounding three passengers, and killed a man and his daughter driving in a car toward the campus. He killed a groundskeeper outside the university library, and entered, firing 70 rounds without hitting anyone. He was shot and killed by police.
November 2, 2013	Greensboro, North Carolina	United States		0	1	1	One person was shot and wounded at North Carolina A&T State University. The victim was hospitalized. The university was temporarily locked down that night. No suspects are in custody.
January 20, 2014	Chester, Pennsylvania	United States		0	1	1	One person was shot and critically injured at Widener University in Chester, Pennsylvania. The incident occurred around 10:00 pm outside the university sport's complex and led to an 8-hour university lock-down. The suspect was not immediately found.
January 21, 2014	West Lafayette, Indiana	United States	Cody Cousins, 23	1	0	1	Cody Cousins shot and killed Andrew Boldt, a senior-year undergraduate student at Purdue University. The shooting occurred in a classroom in the university's electrical engineering building. Cousins was taken into custody. He committed suicide in jail in October 2014.
January 24, 2014	Orangeburg, South Carolina	United States	Justin Bernard Singleton, 19 (charged)	1	0	1	Student Brandon Robinson was shot and killed near a dormitory at South Carolina State University. On January 25, police arrested 19-year-old Justin Bernard Singleton and charged him with murder.
January 25, 2014	Los Angeles, California	United States	Raheen Taylor, 31 and Derrick Wilson, 25 (both charged)	1	0	1	A man named Ricardo Zetino was shot and killed at Los Angeles Valley College. Two suspects were arrested in the fatal shooting.
January 28, 2014	Nashville, Tennessee	United States		0	1	1	One student was shot in the leg in an apparent altercation over a gambling debt at Tennessee State University.
January 30, 2014	Palm Bay, Florida	United States		0	1	1	As three students were fighting in a parking lot of Eastern Florida State College, one shot another. All three student claimed self-defense.
February 12, 2014	Los Angeles, California	United States		0	1	1	A male was shot in the back in a possible gang-related drive-by shooting near the University of Southern California. The suspect fled into the university campus. The victim was last reported in stable condition.
February 21, 2014	San Jose, California	United States	Antonio Guzman Lopez, 38	1	0	1	A man wielding a large knife was shot and killed by officers from the San Jose State University police department, across from the campus. Responding officers first tried to taser the man, but this was ineffective.
February 22, 2014	Augusta, Georgia	United States		0	1	1	A male suspect entered a vehicle at a Georgia Regents University dormitory complex and nearly struck a campus police officer, who shot at him in self-defense. The suspect was taken to Georgia Regents Medical Center with injuries that were not believed to be critical.
April 15, 2014	Calgary, Alberta	Canada	Matthew de Grood, 22	5	0	5	On April 15, 2014, Matthew de Grood, son of Calgary Police Inspector Doug de Grood, stabbed five young adults to death at a house party in the Brentwood neighbourhood of Calgary, Alberta, Canada. The party was several blocks away from the University of Calgary campus, and held to mark the end of its school year. It was Calgary's deadliest massacre.
May 4, 2014	Augusta, Georgia	United States		0	1	1	Two men fired shots inside a dormitory at Paine College, injuring one student in the head. Neither of the suspects was a student at the college.
May 5, 2014	Augusta, Georgia	United States	Xavier D. Cooper	0	1	1	At Paine College one person was reported to be shot. The suspect was apprehended and in custody. It was the second shooting incident to occur at the college campus in two days.
May 8, 2014	Lawrenceville, Georgia	United States		0	1	1	A man was shot and injured on a student parking lot roof at Georgia Gwinnett College. The specific cause was not identified.
May 23, 2014	Isla Vista, California	United States	Elliot Rodger, 22	7	13	20	2014 Isla Vista killings. 22-year-old Elliot Rodger killed six people in a stabbing and shooting rampage in the city of Isla Vista. He stabbed three men to death in his shared apartment; two of them were his roommates, and the third was a visitor. He shot and killed two women outside a University of California, Santa Barbara sorority house, and wounded a third victim there. Rodger opened fire outside a deli, killing a male student, and then engaged in a gun battle with law enforcement officers. He later died from shooting himself.
June 5, 2014	Seattle, Washington	United States	Aaron Ybarra, 26 (charged)	1	2	3	Three people were shot in a hallway at Seattle Pacific University. One person was killed, and another person received life-threatening injuries. The shooter was disarmed by staff members and apprehended at the scene. The suspected shooter is 26-year-old Aaron Ybarra.
September 10, 2014	Toronto, Ontario	Canada	Xiaoyue Zhou, 21	0	1	1	42-year-old University of Toronto mathematics instructor Sean Uppal suffered non life threatening injuries after being stabbed multiple times in his office on the St. George Campus by second year student Xiaoyue Zhou. Uppal had been receiving threatening emails from an undisclosed source, and Zhou's classmates expressed concern about her mental health in the lead up to the attack. She was charged with aggravated assault, assault with a dangerous weapon, and criminal harassment.
September 27, 2014	Terre Haute, Indiana	United States	Calvin McCauley, 21	0	1	1	A 20-year-old Indiana State University (ISU) student was shot by another ISU student inside a residence hall. The injuries were not fatal. The shooter was arrested on the following day.
November 20, 2014	Tallahassee, Florida	United States	Myron May, 31	0	3	1	At around 12:39 a.m. EST, a gunman opened fire in or near the Strozier Library at Florida State University. He shot three people. The gunman, later identified as alumnus Myron May, fired at police officers and was shot and killed by them on the steps of the library.
April 13, 2015	Goldsboro, North Carolina	United States	Kenneth Stancil, 20 (charged)	1	0	1	Ron Lane, a school employee, is shot and killed in the school library of Wayne Community College of Goldsboro, North Carolina. 20-year-old Kenneth Stancil is arrested for the killing early the next day.
August 27, 2015	Savannah, Georgia	United States	?	1	0	1	Christopher Starks, a junior, was fatally shot in a student union building at Savannah State University. The shooter was not identified.
September 3, 2015	Sacramento, California	United States	?	1	2	3	An argument between at least two men escalated into a physical fight on the parking lot of Sacramento City College. A man opened fire, killing 25-year-old student Roman P. Gonzalez and wounding two others. The shooting suspect was not arrested. One of the injured was arrested on suspicion of assault with a deadly weapon.
October 1, 2015	Roseburg, Oregon	United States	Chris Harper-Mercer, 26	10	8	18	2015 Umpqua Community College shooting. 26-year-old Chris Harper-Mercer shot and killed nine people and wounded eight others in a classroom at Umpqua Community College. He engaged in a shootout with police, in which he was wounded, and then fatally shot himself.
October 9, 2015	Flagstaff, Arizona	United States	Steven Edward Jones, 18	1	3	4	2015 Northern Arizona University shooting. A man named Colin Charles Brough died and three others were wounded in a shooting at Northern Arizona University. It is unclear what sparked the shooting, which took place near Mountain View Hall, a dormitory that houses most of the campus' students involved in Greek organizations. 18-year-old Steven Edward Jones was arrested and charged with murder and aggravated assault.
October 22, 2015	Nashville, Tennessee	United States	?	1	3	4	One person was killed and three others were wounded in a shooting at an outdoor courtyard at Tennessee State University. The shooting may have stemmed from an argument over a dice game. A suspect has not been identified or arrested.
October 24, 2015	Stillwater, Oklahoma	United States	Adacia Chambers, 25	4	47	51	2015 Oklahoma State University homecoming parade attack: Adacia Chambers intentionally drove her car into a Homecoming parade hosted by Oklahoma State University. She was arrested and sentenced to life in prison.
November 1, 2015	Winston-Salem, North Carolina	United States	?	1	1	2	One person died and another person was injured after someone opened fire on the campus of Winston-Salem State University. A 21-year-old non-student suspect is sought.
November 4, 2015	University of California, Merced	United States	Faisal Mohammad, 20	1	4	5	University of California, Merced stabbing attack. Terrorist attack by stabbing on campus of University of California, Merced.
January 20, 2016	Bacha Khan University, Charsadda	Pakistan	4 attackers	22+	20+	42+	Bacha Khan University attack. Four terrorists opened fire at Bacha Khan University near the city of Charsaddy, Pakistan. At least 22 people were killed and more than 20 were injured. The terrorists were killed by security forces. Tariq Gidar Afridi faction of Pakistani Taliban claimed responsibility for the attack.
April 5, 2016	Austin, Texas	United States	Meechaiel Criner	1	0	1	The body of first-year dance major Haruka Weiser was found in a creek by the University of Texas at Austin campus. 17-year-old Meechaiel Criner, a homeless youth, was later arrested and charged with first-degree murder of Weiser.
August 24, 2016	American University of Afghanistan	Afghanistan	3 attackers	19-21+	50+ to 53+	69+	American University of Afghanistan attack. An attack by suspected Taliban assailants on a university that had around 700 students in attendance at the time. All three perpetrators were killed.
August 28, 2016	Ithaca, New York	United States	?	1	1	2	A fight between two groups of students at Cornell University left one student dead and another injured.
November 28, 2016	Columbus, Ohio	United States	Abdul Razal Ali Artan	1	13	14	Ohio State University attack. Abdul Razak Ali Artan, a student at Ohio State University, rammed his car at the courtyard near Watts Hall, hitting students and then got out of the car and stabbed them. 12 people were injured. Artan was then shot by a campus police officer, and a bullet hit another student. The incident was investigated as an act of Islamic terrorism.
December 2, 2016	Los Angeles, California	United States	David Jonathan Brown, 28	1	0	1	50-year-old University of Southern California (USC) psychology professor Bosco Tjan was stabbed to death by graduate student David Brown in the Seeley G. Mudd Building. Tjan was Brown's graduate supervisor, and USC's Department of Public Safety noted that the murder "was the result of a personal dispute." In 2018, Brown was found not guilty by reason of insanity.
April 28, 2017	Lexington, Kentucky	United States	Mitchell W. Adkins (charged)	0	3	3	A former student at Transylvania University stabbed two people in the campus coffee shop based on their political ideology.
May 1, 2017	Austin, Texas	United States	Kendrex White	1	3	4	A student stabbed four people on the University of Texas at Austin campus midday, killing one and injuring three.
October 30, 2017	Salt Lake City, Utah	United States	Austin Boutain	1	0	1	Austin Boutain shot ChenWei Guo, a University of Utah student from China, in an attempted carjacking. He instructed Guo's female passenger to walk up a nearby canyon, but she fled. Boutain shot at her but missed. He was apprehended the following day at a public library. During the course of the investigation it was discovered Boutain and his wife, Katherine, had traveled to Utah from Colorado in a truck registered to a Colorado murder victim. Boutain was subsequently charged in his murder as well. On September 12, 2018, Austin Boutain pled guilty to first degree murder in exchange for a sentence of life without possibility of parole.
November 1, 2017	Moscow	Russia	Andrey Emelyannikov	2	0	2	An 18-year-old student killed his teacher with a knife and then committed suicide with a circular saw at a college in western Moscow.
May 10, 2018	Barabinsk	Russia	Ilya Ivanistov	1	3 (Note: 1 by gunfire, 2 indirectly.)	4	Barabinsk college shooting: A 16-year-old student shot and wounded one of his classmates in shoulder, exited in corridor and then shot himself. 2 other students were injured jumping from the window escaping the shooter.
October 17, 2018	Kerch	Russia (de facto), Ukraine (de jure)	Vladislav Roslyakov	21	67	88	Kerch Polytechnic College massacre: An 18-year-old student detonated a self-made bomb on the first floor of college before starting shooting at people. 20 people were killed and 67 others wounded before shooter committed suicide.
March 16, 2019	Iquique	Chile	Marco Antonio Velásquez González	3	0	3	Iquique military school shooting: An 18-year-old cadet who frequently suffered from bullying and depression shot two of his superiors dead at the Armored Cavalry military school.
April 30, 2019	Charlotte, North Carolina	United States	Trystan Andrew Terrell	2	4	6	UNC Charlotte shooting: At the University of North Carolina at Charlotte, a 22-year-old former history undergraduate at UNC Charlotte shot six students killing two.
November 14, 2019	Blagoveshchensk, Amur Oblast	Russia	Daniil Zasorin	2	3	5	Blagoveshchensk college shooting: A 19-year-old student Daniil Zasorin shot and killed one of his classmates and injured three other students before being wounded by police and killing himself.

=== 2020–2025 ===
Date	Location	Country	Attackers	Dead	Injured	Total	Incident Description
September 20, 2021	Perm, Perm Krai	Russia	Timur Bekmansurov	6	41 (Note: 24 by gunfire, 17 indirectly.)	47	Perm State University shooting: an 18-year-old student opened fire near a Perm State University buildings and inside it. After several minutes he was shot by policeman and detained.
October 13, 2021	Leioa	Spain	21-year-old man	0	0	0	A man opened fire with a shotgun at The University of the Basque Country
January 24, 2022	Heidelberg	Germany	Nikolai G.	2	3	5	Heidelberg University shooting: an 18-year-old man opened fire in a lecture hall at the University of Heidelberg. Several people were injured, one killed and the suspected perpetrator committed suicide.
July 24, 2022	Quezon City	Philippines	Chao Tiao Yumol, 38	3	1	4	3 people, including a former Lamitan mayor, were killed at the Ateneo de Manila University.
October 5, 2022	West Lafayette, Indiana	United States	Ji Min “Jimmy” Sha	1	0	1	A Purdue student was stabbed in his dorm room on campus and died of “multiple sharp force traumatic injuries,” according to a preliminary autopsy.
November 13, 2022	Charlottesville, Virginia	United States	Christopher Darnell Jones Jr.	3	2	5	2022 University of Virginia shooting: Christopher Darnell Jones Jr., a student, opened fire on a chartered bus that had just returned to UVA from a trip.He was arrested afterwards.
November 13, 2022	Moscow, Idaho	United States	Bryan Christopher Kohberger	4	0	4	University of Idaho students: Madison Mogen, 21, Kaylee Goncalves, 21, Xana Kernodle, 20, and Ethan Chapin, 20, were stabbed to death in their off-campus accommodation. Bryan Kohberger, 28, was arrested in December 2022, and pled guilty on July 2, 2025.
February 13, 2023	East Lansing, Michigan	United States	Anthony Dwayne McRae, 43	4	5	9	2023 Michigan State University shooting: a 43-year-old man opened fire on a campus of Michigan State University and killed himself.
June 13, 2023	Nottingham, England	United Kingdom	Valdo Amissão Mendes Calocane, 31	3	3	6	On 13 June 2023, Grace O'Malley-Kumar and Barnaby Webber, two 19 year old first-year students of the university, were fatally stabbed in the early hours of the morning. The assailant was charged with three murders, including Ian Coates, a maintenance-man aged 65, taking his van which was used to impact three pedestrians, resulting in an additional three attempted-murder charges. The attacker graduated from the University of Nottingham in 2022.
June 28, 2023	Waterloo, Ontario	Canada	Geovanny Villalba-Aleman, 24	0	3	3	A former international student entered a gender studies class at the University of Waterloo and spoke with the professor for a moment before stabbing her and two students. Police described the attack as "a hate-motivated incident related to gender expression and gender identity."
August 24, 2023	Majorstuen, Oslo	Norway	Anonymous student, 20	0	2	2	A 20-year-old university student stabbed two female professors with a knife at the Institute of Pharmacy at the University of Oslo.
November 2, 2023	Kitere, Rongo	Kenya	Anonymous student	1	0	1	A third-year student at Rongo University was allegedly stabbed to death by a fellow student while they were drinking. The two had gone out for a drink before they disagreed over an unknown topic and began fighting. The suspect pulled out a knife and stabbed his fellow student. The death of the victim was announced to all students.
December 6, 2023	Paradise, Nevada	United States	Anthony Polito, 67	4	3	7	2023 UNLV shooting: Polito fatally shot three people and wounded a faculty member inside the University of Nevada, Las Vegas. He then walked out of the campus and got into a shootout with police. Polito injured two officers before he was killed. Before the shooting, Polito applied to be a professor for various schools throughout Nevada, but none of his applications were accepted.
December 21, 2023	Prague	Czech Republic	David Kozák, 24	14	25	40	2023 Prague shooting: Kozák shot and killed 13 people at the Faculty of Arts, Charles University and wounded 25 others, nine of them seriously. The shooter killed himself when police arrived. Kozák killed his father before the shooting, and was identified as a possible suspect in two other murders the previous week.
February 13, 2024	Manassas, Virginia	United States	Philip Austin Brant, 26	2	1	3	Brant stabbed two people at a vocational school, killing one, before being shot dead by police.
March 6, 2024	Guadalajara, Jalisco	Mexico	Gabriel Alejandro Galaviz, 20	3	1	4	Technological University of Guadalajara attack: 20-year-old Galaviz, armed with a knife and an axe, entered the Universidad Tecnológica de Guadalajara campus and attacked three employees, two women and one man. The women did not survive. Also, he previously murdered another woman at a nearby motel. The aggressor was not a student at the university, his motivations were unclear, and the police believe his attack was a copycat of other school attacks such as the Colegio Cervantes shooting and Suzano massacre. Galaviz committed suicide in prison.
November 16, 2024	Yixing	China	Xu Jiajin, 21	8	17	25	2024 Wuxi stabbing: Xu Jiajin, a recent graduate, stabbed 25 people with a knife across multiple locations at the Wuxi Vocational Institute of Arts and Technology, including a dormitory. He was arrested by police at the scene, and sentenced to death 2 months later.
April 17, 2025	Tallahassee, Florida	United States	Phoenix Ikner, born Christian Gunnar Eriksen	2	7 (Note: 6 by gunfire, 1 indirectly.)	9	2025 Florida State University shooting: an 20-year-old student opened fire outside the Florida State University student union and inside it. After approximately four minutes, he was shot by campus police after refusing to comply with verbal commands.
May 2, 2025	Cincinnati, Ohio	United States	Rodney Hinton Jr., 38	1	0	1	Rodney Hinton Jr. deliberately rammed his car into Deputy Larry Henderson, a police officer that was directing traffic for a commencement ceremony at the University of Cincinnati. Henderson was killed in the attack, and Hinton was sentenced to 15 years to life in prison. The day prior, Hinton's son Ryan was fatally shot by police officers, and Rodney had viewed the bodycam footage of the incident hours before killing Deputy Henderson.
May 7, 2025	Warsaw	Poland	Mieszko Ruciński, 22	1	1	2	2025 University of Warsaw attack: Ruciński killed a 53-year-old female Małgorzata Dynak member of staff at the University of Warsaw with an axe and severely injured a 39-year-old male security guard who tried to help the victim. Ruciński has been arrested.
May 19, 2025	Platteville, Grant County, Wisconsin	United States	Hallie Helms, 22	2	0	2	A student shot another 22-year-old student in a targeted and isolated shooting at a University of Wisconsin–Platteville dormitory, injuring them, before committing suicide. The student later died.
July 25, 2025	Albuquerque, New Mexico	United States	John Fuentes, 18	1	1	2	A man opened fire inside a dormitory at the University of New Mexico while four people were gaming, killing a 14-year-old and injuring a 19-year-old. The suspect was arrested and charged.
October 4, 2025	Orangeburg, South Carolina	United States	Unknown	1	0	1	A woman was killed in a shooting on campus.
November 6, 2025	Reading, Berkshire	United Kingdom	Two unknown males, 17 & 16	0	1	1	A person was injured following a stabbing at Reading College, causing a large response from the police. The perpetrators, a 17-year-old and 16-year-old male, were later arrested, and charged with intent and possessing a bladed article on school premises and assault by beating respectively.
December 9, 2025	Lexington, Kentucky	United States	Jacob Lee Bard, 48 (accused, later cleared)	1	1	2	2025 Kentucky State University shooting: One person was killed and another injured at the University of Kentucky when a person opened fire in self-defense on campus grounds. The shooter was a parent of a student at the university, with police stating the shooting was a result of an altercation that escalated.
December 13, 2025	Providence, Rhode Island	United States	Cláudio Manuel Neves Valente, 48	4	8	12	2025 Brown University shooting: Two people were murdered and 8 injured at Brown University when a graduate of the university opened fire at the engineering and physics buildings. The perpetrator would remain at large for multiple days, with him going on to murder physicist Nuno Loureiro at his home, committing suicide soon after.
December 23, 2025	Toronto, Ontario	Canada	Babatunde Afuwape, 28 (accused)	1	0	1	20-year-old Shivank Avasthi was shot and killed on a campus trail at the University of Toronto Scarborough. Police believe it was a random attack.

=== 2026–present ===
Date	Location	Country	Attackers	Dead	Injured	Total	Incident Description
February 7, 2026	Ufa	Russia	Alexander S., 15	0	8	8	2026 Bashkir State Medical University stabbings: 15-year-old Alexander S. attacked students and two police officers with a knife at a dormitory at the Bashkir State Medical University. He then attempted suicide before being arrested by police.
February 11, 2026	Anapa	Russia	Ilya O., 17	1	2	3	2026 Anapa college shooting: 17-year-old Ilya O. fatally shot 55-year-old Nikolai Pavlovich, a security guard at the school, and wounded 2 others with a shotgun. He was arrested by police at the scene.
June 4, 2026	Guildford, Surrey	United Kingdom	Almunthir Daqamah, 21	0	1	1	Almunthir Daqamah, a 21-year-old Saudi national and former student of the University of Surrey, shot a member of staff on campus with a crossbow before being subdued. He was charged the following day with attempted murder, possession of a bladed article, and possession of Class B drugs.
October 10, 2026	Warsaw	Poland	21 year-old student	0	3	3	A 21 year-old student attacked two 17 year-olds and a 24 year-old with a knife outside a post secondary school campus in the east of Warsaw. One of the teenagers needed to be taken to hospital.
November 4, 2026	Chicago	United States	Pugazhan Tamizhsami Sathyamurthy, 20	0	0	0	Pugazhan Sathyamurthy, a 20-year-old student at the University of Illinois Chicago, threw a Molotov Cocktail towards a student, though the molotov failed to start a fire. Sathyamurthy then pulled out a large knife and attempted to stab 2 students, though both escaped unharmed. Sathyamurthy was detained by security and arrested at the scene.

== See also ==
- School bullying
- School shooting
- School violence
- List of school-related attacks
- List of attacks related to primary schools
- List of attacks related to secondary schools
- List of rampage killers: School massacres
