= Gadirov =

Gadirov (Azerbaijani: Qədirov, Russian: Гадиров) is an Azerbaijani masculine surname; its feminine counterpart is Gadirova. The surname may refer to the following notable people:

- Farda Gadirov, the perpetrator of the Azerbaijan State Oil Academy shooting in 2009
- Jennifer Gadirova (born 2004), British artistic gymnast
- Jessica Gadirova (born 2004), British artistic gymnast, twin sister of Jennifer
