= Green Lake (Kunming) =

Lake of China

Coordinates: 25°3′1.51″N 102°42′8.2″E

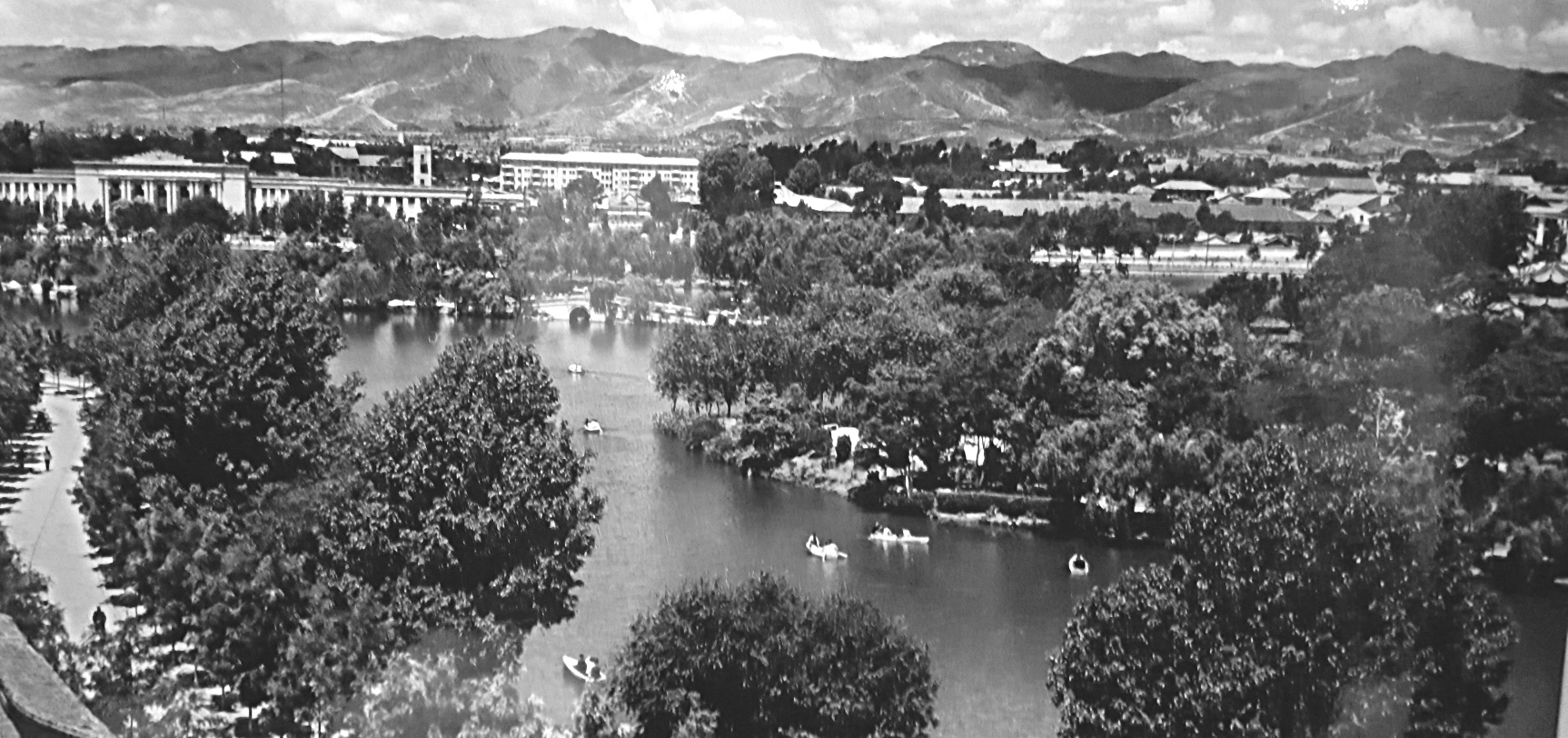
Panoramic view from the east, circa 1940s.

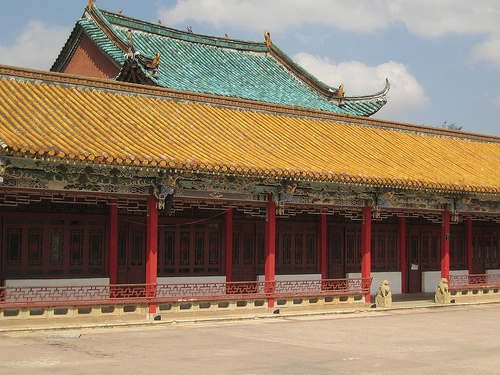
An old building in Cuihu Park.

Green Lake Park, or Cui Hu Park (simplified Chinese: 翠湖公园; traditional Chinese: 翠湖公園; pinyin: Cuìhú Gōngyuán), is an urban park in Kunming, Yunnan Province, China. It was established in the 20th century.

The park consists of a group of 4 small sub-lakes linked by bridges built in traditional Chinese architecture. The lake was originally a water reservoir for the city. There are performances of pieces from Chinese operas and of folk music within and around the park. The most famous building in the park is Jiangwu Pavilion, a tourist attraction. Also located in the park is a statue of Nie Er, the composer of China's national anthem.

The park is located in the city center, near Yunnan University, Yuantong Hill, and Wuhua Hill. Cuihu Park is surrounded by a ring road, and along the edge of that road are restaurants and tea houses (some with rooftop dining), shops, and hotels, including the upscale Green Lake Hotel and Grand Park Hotel (formerly the Harbour Plaza Hotel).

== Cuihu's gulls ==
During the winter months, black-headed gulls from Siberia migrate to Kunming, settling in bodies of water around the city and causing Cuihu to become a very popular gull-feeding area. Local vendors sell bread in and around the park, which visitors throw in the air or into the water to feed the gulls.

== In popular culture ==
Green Lake Park was visited during The Amazing Race 18 when the park was featured as the "Pit Stop" of the 5th leg.

== Gallery ==
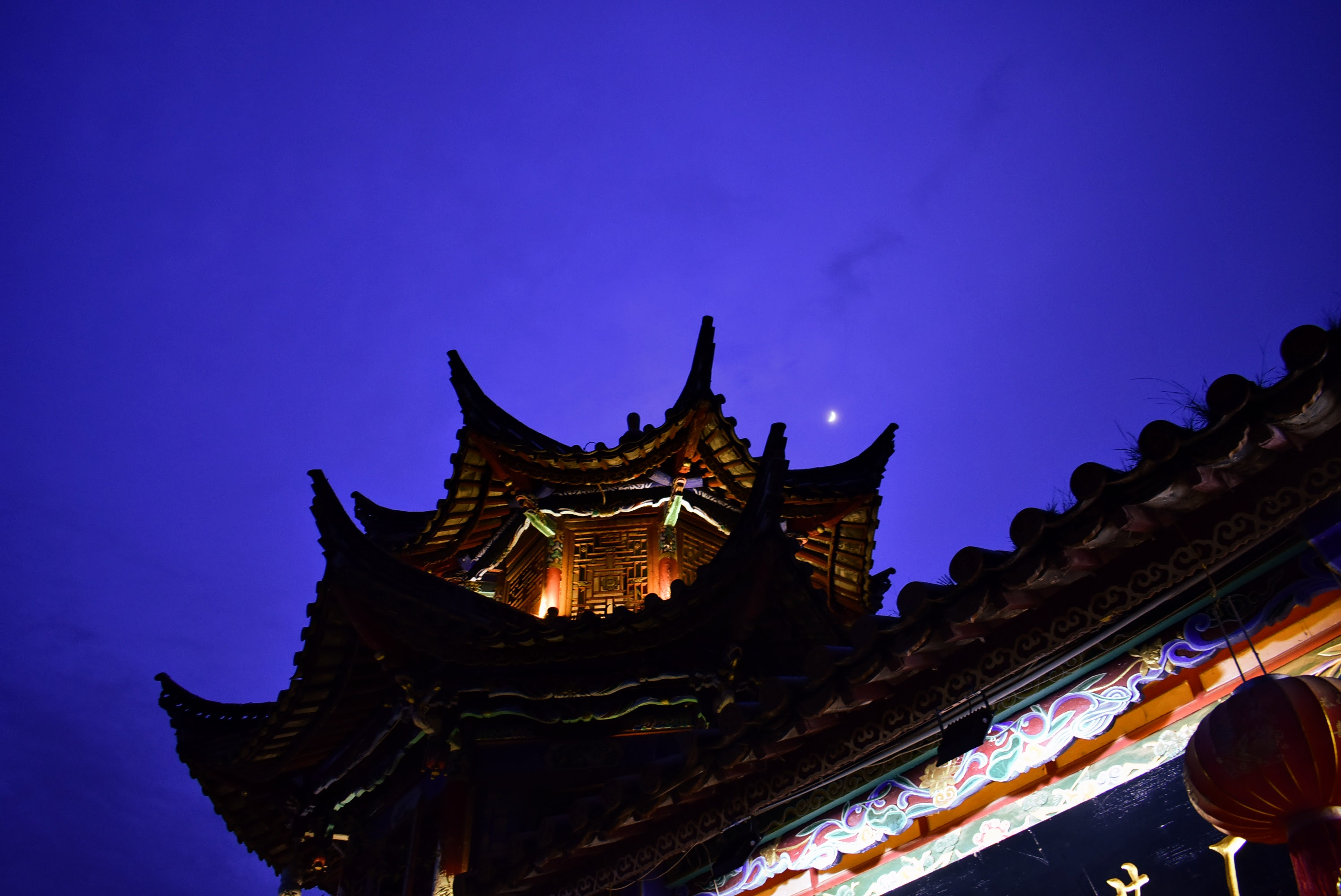
Cuihu

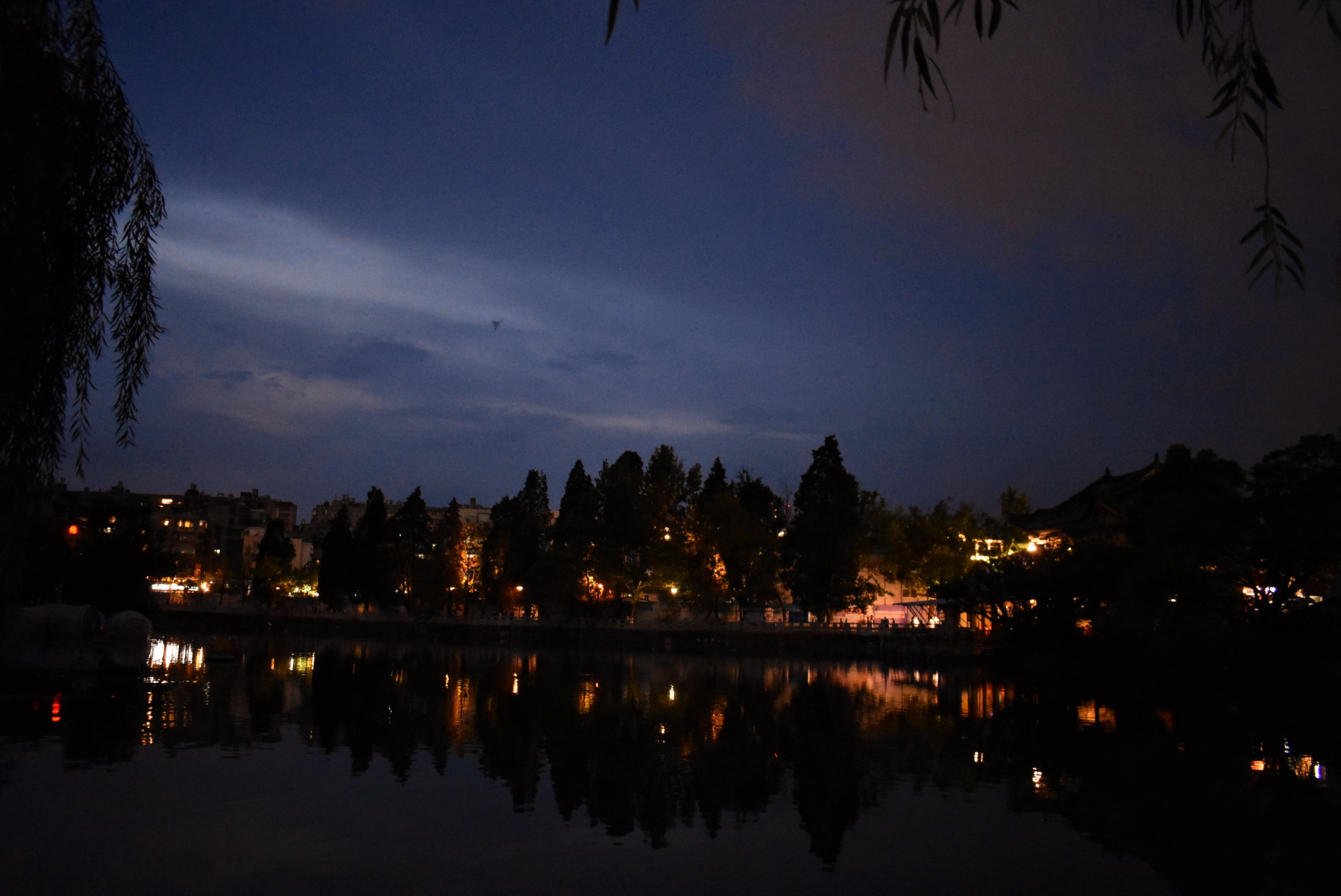
View of the lake just after nightfall

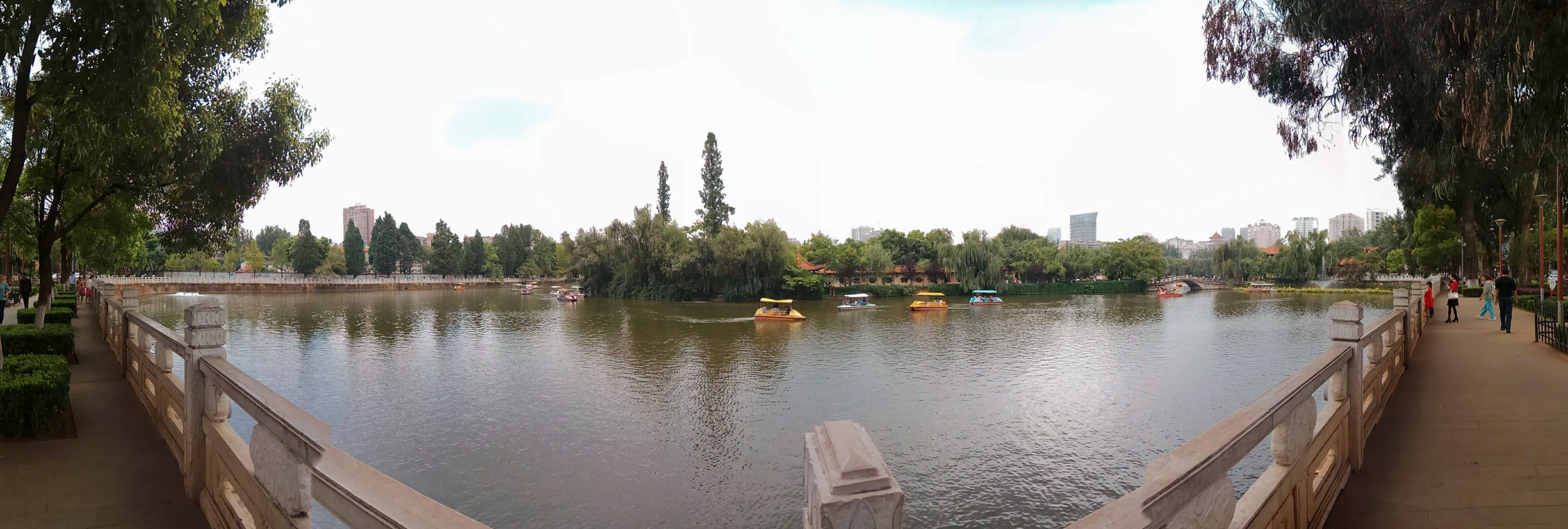
Panorama

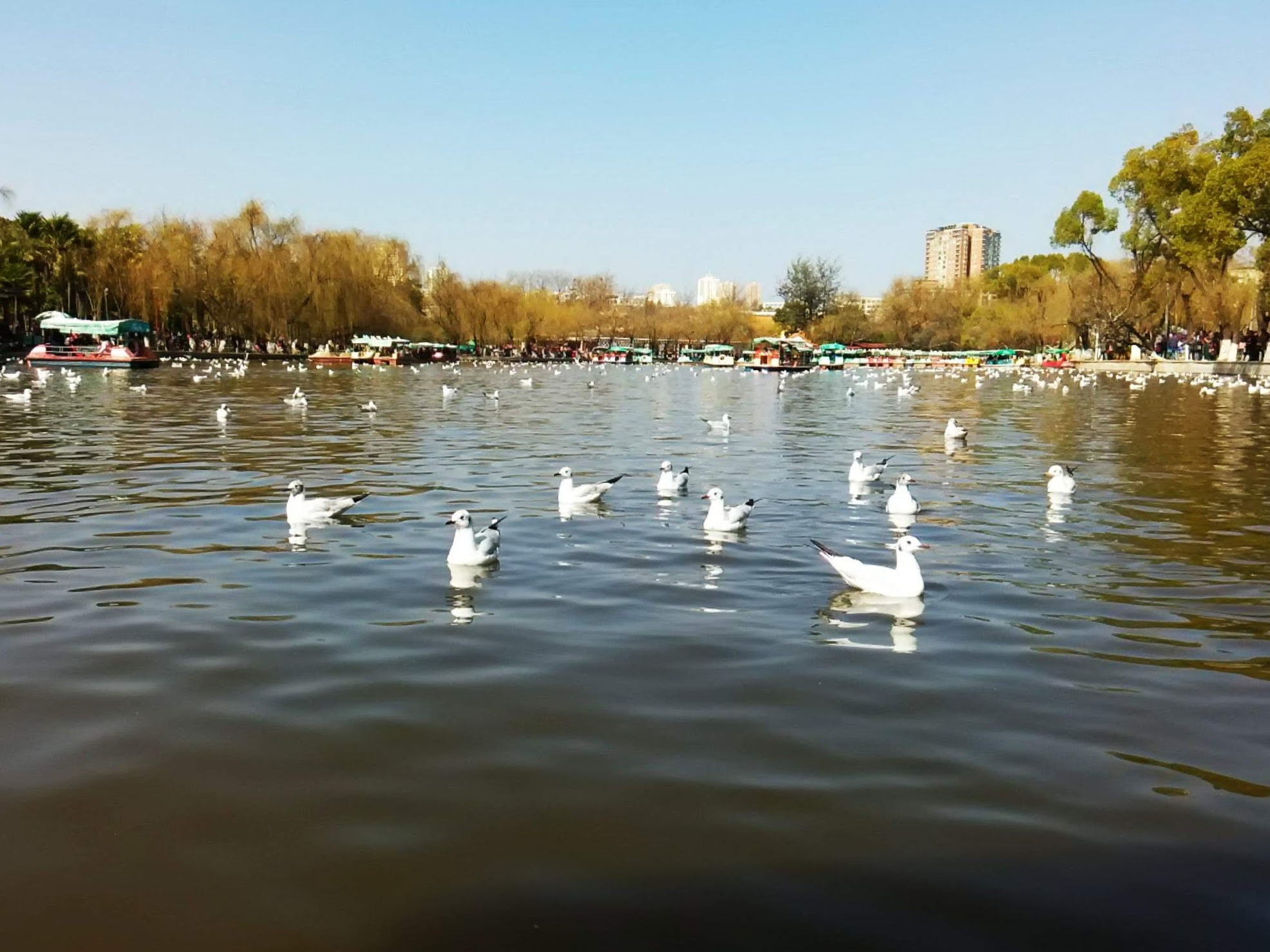
Wintering gulls
