= 1976 Computer Learning Center shooting =

Mass shooting in California

- Location: 34.037902°N 118.4745492°W; Computer Learning Center, Santa Monica, California, U.S.
- Date: February 19, 1976; 8:30 a.m. (PTD)
- Attack type: Mass shooting, school shooting, shootout
- Weapon: Sawed-off 12-gauge shotgun
- Deaths: 1
- Injuries: 8 (7 from gunfire, including the perpetrator)
- Perpetrator: Neil Jordan Liebeskind
- Defender: Howard W. Barnes
- Charges: Manslaughter; Assault with a deadly weapon (x7)
- Verdict: Not guilty by reason of insanity

On February 19, 1976, 18-year-old student Neil Jordan "Bishop" Liebeskind opened fire with a sawed-off 12-gauge shotgun at the Computer Learning Center, an independent computer school in Santa Monica, California, United States. After killing one student and wounding seven others in a classroom, he fled to the parking lot. Security guards for a television crew nearby overheard the shooting, so they ran to the school and ordered Liebeskind to surrender. The gunman instead shot and wounded one of the security guards, so they returned fire and severely wounded him. At his trial, Liebeskind was found not guilty by reason of insanity. He was subsequently sent to a mental hospital.

== Shooting ==
On February 19, 1976, Liebeskind's teacher had passed out a short quiz and then left the room. Afterwards, Liebeskind assembled his sawed-off 12-gauge shotgun, which he had sneaked in to the building with a long, thin box. At about 8:30 a.m., Liebeskind stood up, shotgun in hand, and yelled "Pastore, stand up!" He was referring to Kenneth Pastore, a 22-year-old student who he often argued with. Liebeskind then fired once, and many of the students took cover under tables. After firing a second shot, he called out someone's name and continued to shoot.

He shot the following students:

- Fernando E. Alcivar, 24—Alcivar was sitting next to Pastore when he was shot. He died from his wounds.
- Kenneth Pastore, 22—shot in the shoulder
- Brad Czarske, 20—shot in the left hand
- Steven Boyadjian, 35—shot in the buttocks
- Steven Sutton, 20—shot in the right shoulder
- George Garden, 23—shot in the left hand

A seventh student received an eye wound from flying glass. Liebeskind then ran out the door and down the corridor, shooting as he went. A witness said he looked expressionless. The students barricaded the classroom door until the gunman exited the building, whereupon they stumbled toward a nearby bank where a television crew was filming a scene for the show Jigsaw John.

The three security guards for the television production company, all of whom were former police officers, jumped into action upon hearing screams. Howard W. Barnes, 57; Glen Yeaton, 56; and Karl Kapin, 57, all advanced towards the school. Barnes ran through the building while Yeaton and Kapin surrounded the exterior.

Shortly afterwards, Barnes found Liebeskind scuffling with a man in the front seat of a car in the parking lot. Barnes ordered the gunman to drop his weapon, but he instead shot Barnes in the thigh. The security guard then returned fire, and he was soon joined by Yeaton. Barnes reported that he fired at least six times and Yeaton said he fired 11 times. Two of Barnes' bullets hit Liebeskind in the chest, severely wounding him. He was subsequently arrested and taken to a hospital.

== Perpetrator ==
Neil Jordan "Bishop" Liebeskind, of suburban Chatsworth, was a straight-A honors student who had been studying at the school since November 1975. The school's director said that Liebeskind was clean-cut, short-haired, and had a "good aptitude for data processing." A former admissions representative for the school described him as a "very intense young man" who was "very conscious of himself" and "tried to put forth the impression of being a very, very capable person... that he could do anything."

Liebeskind's peers described him as a quiet loner. He had gotten into arguments with Kenneth Pastore a number of times. About two weeks prior to the shooting, Pastore saw Liebeskind using a knife to carve his initials into Czarske's briefcase. Pastore told him to stop, but Liebeskind waved his knife around and played it off as a joke.

=== Legal proceedings ===
Liebeskind was initially charged with one count of murder, one count of kidnapping, and nine counts of assault with a deadly weapon in March 1976. However, the charges were later reduced to one count of manslaughter and seven counts of assault with a deadly weapon. Liebeskind pleaded innocent to the charges and was found not guilty by reason of insanity at his trial in January 1977. He was subsequently sent to a state mental hospital.

== See also ==
- List of school shootings in the United States by death toll
- List of school shootings in the United States (before 2000)
- List of attacks related to post-secondary schools
- List of mass shootings in the United States
