= Azerbaijan State Oil Academy shooting =

Civilian attack in 2009

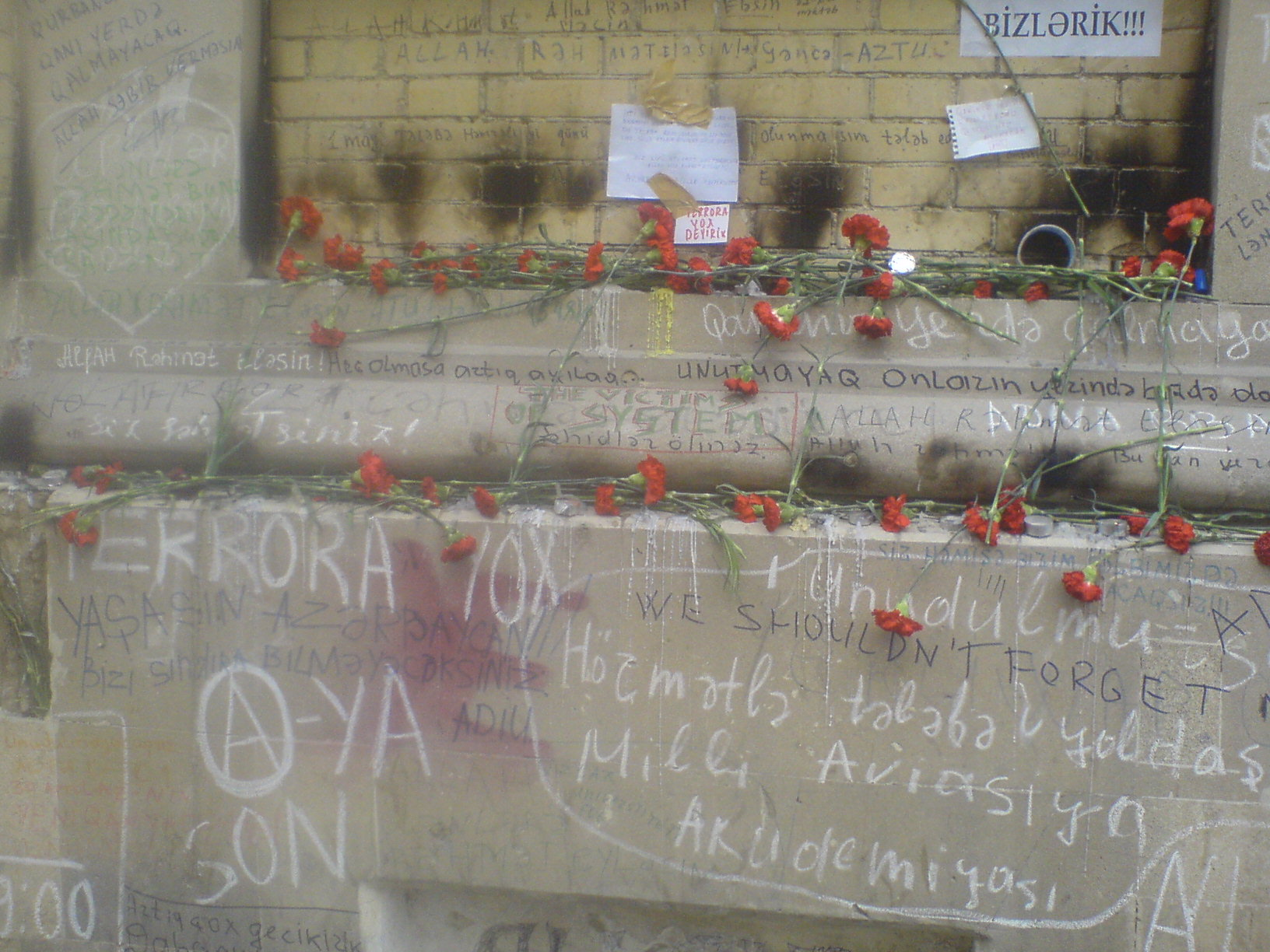
- Wall of the Azerbaijan State Oil Academy after the shooting
- Location: 40.3785°N 49.8485°E; Azerbaijan State Oil Academy, Baku, Azerbaijan
- Date: 30 April 2009; 17 years ago 9:30 a.m. AZT
- Target: Students And Staff In Azerbaijan State Oil Academy
- Attack type: School shooting, mass shooting, mass murder, murder-suicide
- Weapon: Makarov PM
- Deaths: 13 (including the perpetrator)
- Injuries: 13
- Perpetrator: Farda Gadirov
- Motive: Thrill

The Azerbaijan State Oil Academy shooting (Azerbaijani: Azərbaycan Dövlət Neft Akademiyasında terror hadisəsi) occurred on 30 April 2009, at the Azerbaijan State Oil Academy (ASOA), a public university in Baku, Azerbaijan. Twelve people were killed (students and staff members including the Deputy Principal of the institution) by an armed assailant and several others were wounded. A joint statement by the Azerbaijan Interior Ministry and Prosecutor General's Office identified the perpetrator as 28-year-old Farda Gadirov, a Georgian citizen of Azerbaijani descent.

Two buses of special forces had arrived at the scene. According to Ehsan Zahidov, a spokesman for Interior Ministry, the special troops conducted an operation while people reportedly having been held hostage were released. Three cartridge belts with capacity of forty and seventy one bullets along with two magazines were taken from Gadirov's body.

== Spree ==
Gadirov attacked the second building of the ASOA. First he killed a security guard and a cleaner as he entered the building, before opening fire on students and lecturers. Then while climbing from the first floor to the sixth, he shot people indiscriminately mainly in the head along the way. A witness said one student had tried to stop him but was also shot in the head. Another witness reported seeing two gunmen. Terrorism was suspected. The gunman barricaded himself in the Academy and police cordoned off the building. 12 people were killed and 13 wounded. Gadirov fatally shot himself, when he saw the police were approaching. Police and paramedics soon arrived on the scene. The armed police cordoned off the building. All major routes to the university were blocked. Bodies were found all over the building. The injured were taken to ambulances stationed outside and evacuated to hospital. Most were soon in stable condition, but some were in critical condition and underwent surgery. All students were evacuated and sent home.

However doubts over several details were expressed. Azeri military expert Uzeyir Jafarov said it is quite obscure to him the inexperienced assailant could kill and injure so many persons with a Makarov pistol. Jafarov outlined, that Gadirov was not a military person, but a civilian.

== Victims ==
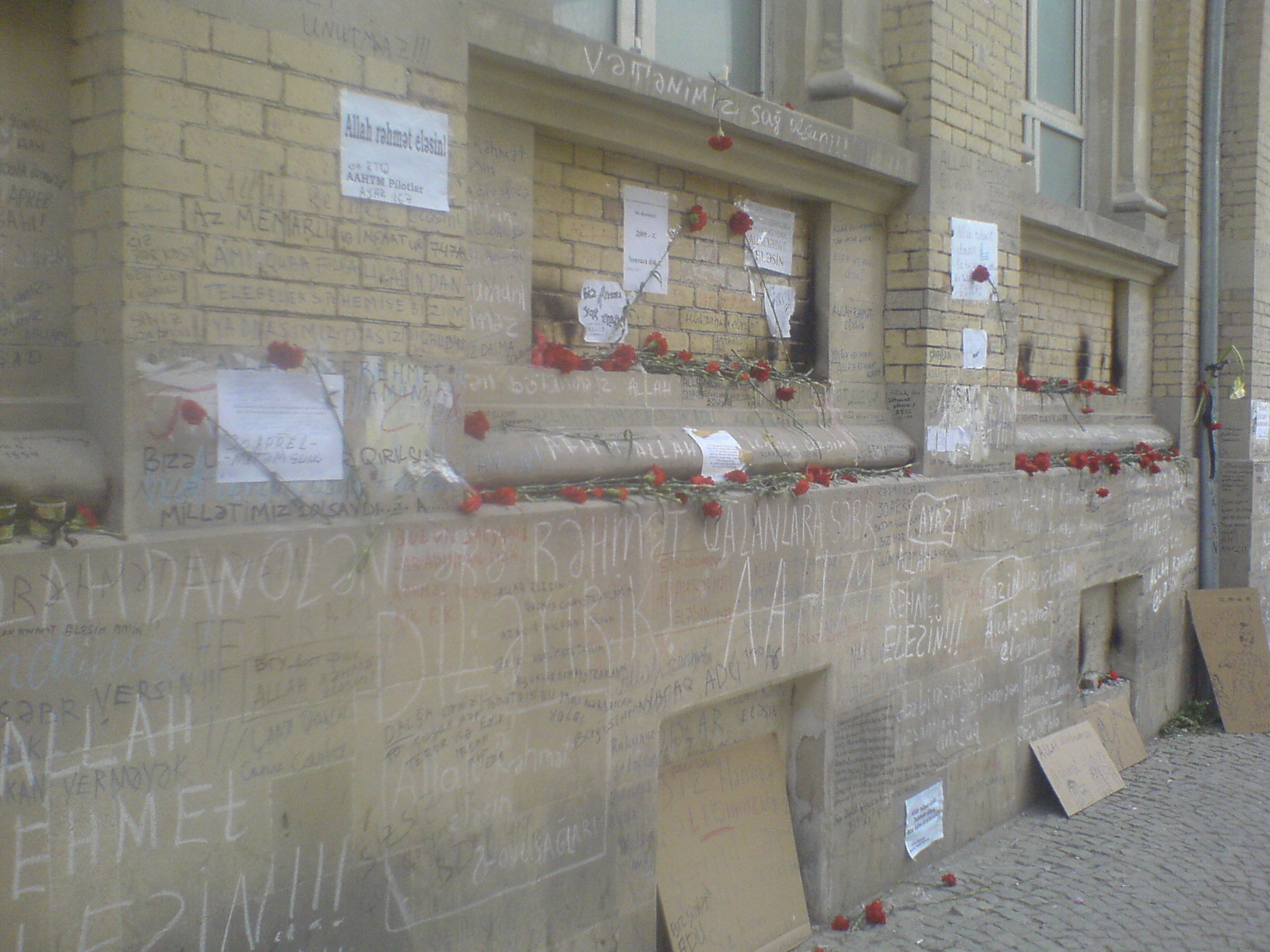
Wall of ASOA after terror act. 3 May

According to Azeri Health Ministry, thirteen people were killed and ten wounded. Among wounded were two nationals of Sudan (Moustafa Mohammad, Amrouh Seyid Ahmad) and one of Syria (Daas Muawiya). Three of the wounded were discharged from hospital shortly after the shooting.

A total of thirteen people were killed in the incident:

- Emin Abdullayev, 20, student
- Ramiz Abdullayev, 69, Deputy Principal of ASOA and Chairman of the Faculty of Oil and Gas Production
- Jeyhun Aslanov, 21, student
- Tamella Azizova, 58, lecturer and researcher
- Ruslan Babashov, 19, student
- Ayaz Baghirov, 21, student
- Yusif Bandaliyev, 20, student
- Ayna Gurbanova, 52, cafeteria worker
- Savalan Jabbarov, 22, student
- Taleh Mammadov, 21, student
- Shafa Mammadova, 31, laboratory assistant
- Majnun Vahidov, 63, associate professor, playwright and chess composer
- Farda Gadirov, 28, gunman

The psychological aid was launched in Clinic Psychiatric Hospital #2, Neuropsychic Hospital and Children's Neuropsychic Hospital. One thousand candles are planned to light in front of the university building in memory of the victims. The blood donation took place in Azerbaijani regions at initiative of the Health Ministry. A donation, held in Saatli, involved 230 people.

== Investigation ==
The criminal case was launched under article 120.2.2 (deliberate murder committed from hooligan prompting), 120.2.4 (deliberate murder committed with special cruelty or endangering the public), 120.2.7 (deliberate murder of two or more persons), article 29 (attempt to murder), article 228.1 (illegal purchase, transfer, selling, storage, transportation or carrying of fire-arms, accessories to it, supplies (except for the smooth-bore hunting weapon and ammunition to it), explosives) of the Criminal Code of Azerbaijan. According to the spokesman for the Prosecutor General Eldar Sultanov, Shirhan Nadir oglu Aliyev, a fellow-villager of Gadirov, was detained as a suspect. The criminal case launched against Farda Gadirov was dropped because of his suicide. According to presidential order, direct financial assistances amounting to 30,000 manats were scheduled to be rendered to the families of killed persons, and 15,000 to the wounded from the president's reserve fund.

The parliament's Standing Human Rights Commission chair Rabiyyat Aslanova said that security must be increased in postsecondary institutions, but there is no need to amend any law to up security in them: "Higher schools have own regulations. The issue must be solved under the regulations". Aslanova said that the cameras must be installed at the entrance to universities. MP Fazil Mustafa told that it is impossible to check everybody, but serious dangers can be prevented.

A mourning ceremony began on Friday. The MPs, professors and students of ASOA, as well as the students of other country's universities, and the members of youth organizations attended the ceremony, which started early morning and continued until the night. The participants laid red carnations and lit candles at the entrance and stairs of the Academy. The Irali Public Union joined the event with the slogan "No terror!". Roughly 2,000 students marched in Baku that day. A mourning procession was also held by Azeri Americans in Washington.

=== Allegations ===
A Georgian citizen of Armenian origin, Mardun Gumashyan was subsequently charged as the mastermind of the shooting. As stated in the indictment, Gumashyan was born in Georgian region of Marneuli in 1951. According to the version of the prosecution Gumashyan had founded a criminal group, which embraced Farda Gadirov, Javidan Amirov, Nadir Aliyev and Najaf Suleymanov; Gumashyan had struck a bargain with them to commit a terrorist attack offering them $50,000 and paying $5,000 to Gadirov, who purchased a Makarov pistol and practiced to shoot. The terrorist group arrived in Baku in March 2009.

On 21 April 2010 the court investigating violent crimes began to hear the case. The fellow-villagers of the murderer were among the detained. However, on the preparatory meeting the accused themselves announced that they had given testimony under torture. Some of the witnesses declared in the court that the testimonies against Gumashyan were given either under pressure or were not signed by them at all. According to the state prosecutor Abdulla Yusifov, the law-enforcement authorities are taking up all the necessary measures for prosecuting Gumashyan. The prosecutor announced in the court that an arrest warrant was issued for Gumashyan through the Interpol. According to the head of the National Central Bureau of Interpol in Armenia, as of the beginning of May 2010 Gumashyan was not in the list of people wanted by Interpol.

The investigation of the crime raised many questions from the media. The Armenian press presents this version of the prosecution as a "mindless" attempt to place the blame for a terrorist act, which was overlooked by the Azerbaijani law enforcement bodies, on the Armenians. The enquiry made by Azerbaijani newspaper Zerkalo to the General Prosecutor's Office of Azerbaijan on interrogating Gumashyan received no answer. Neither could the Ministry of Foreign Affairs of Azerbaijan give any information on this case. According to the representatives of the Azerbaijani community in Georgia, they filed a request to the Ministry of Internal Affairs of Georgia and received the following reply: "Mardun Gumashyan was arrested by the law enforcement bodies of Georgia immediately after the terrorist act, however he was set free in a week."

During the meeting with the correspondent of Azerbaijani newspaper Yeni Müsavat, Gumashyan denied having known Farda Gadirov. Gumashyan reported that he had turned to the General Prosecutor's office and to the Ministry of Internal Affairs of Georgia where he was told that the Azerbaijani side took no action concerning his arrest. The representatives of newspaper Zerkalo themselves turned to the Ministry of Internal Affairs of Georgia where they confirmed Mardun Gumashyan's words that the Ministry had received no appeals concerning his case. The representative of the Administration of the President of Georgia expressed his regret Azerbaijani law enforcement bodies were searching for evidence of Armenian responsibility., stating that "It is a common practice in Azerbaijan to blame Armenians in everything". The efforts made by the representatives of the newspaper for obtaining clarifications about the international arrest warrant from the bureau of Interpol in Azerbaijan yielded no results. On his behalf the head of the press service of the Ministry of Internal Affairs of Azerbaijan announced that he knew nothing about Gumashyan's arrest warrant. The head of the press service of the General Prosecutor's office announced that necessary measures will be taken for Mardun Gumashyan's arrest in the future. Turan Information Agency notes that Gumashyan lives quietly in his village and is not hiding from the law enforcement bodies; the agency also informs that no compelling evidence suggesting Gumashyan's complicity to this case was presented at the trial in Baku. Later Azerbaijan issued an arrest warrant for Mardun Gumashyan through Interpol for organizing a terrorist act.

On the third anniversary of the student shooting, in April 2012, Azerbaijani newspaper Zerkalo made an enquiry to the MFA of Georgia where they were informed that the Azerbaijani side had not turned to them with the request of detaining Gumashyan. According to Arif Yunus the Azerbaijani authorities make such statements for the internal audiences: "If Azerbaijani journalists can interview Mardun Gumashyan then why can't the law enforcement bodies of Azerbaijan find him until now?".

On 4 February 2013 Tofig Yagublu, a columnist for the newspaper Yeni Müsavat, was arrested. The editor of the newspaper connected Yagublu's arrest as he was the only reporter who had travelled to Shulaver village in Georgia and interviewed Mardun Gumashyan whom the authorities of Azerbaijan had accused of organizing a terrorist act. Having visited Gumashyan's place in 2010, Yagublu portrayed the life of the "terrorist who was wanted by the Azerbaijani authorities" and came to a conclusion that Gumashyan was an ordinary worker and that the information about his warrant did not correspond to the reality. According to the editor of Yeni Müsavat the exposure of this myth was the reason for which the journalist was arrested. The High Representative of the Union for Foreign Affairs and Security Policy for the European Union Catherine Ashton and the Commissioner for Enlargement and European Neighbourhood Policy Štefan Füle expressed their concern with T. Yagublu's arrest. In response to this the MFA of Azerbaijan declared that the involvement of the EU in the investigation process was unacceptable for them.

== Perpetrator ==
Farda Asad oglu Gadirov (Azeri: Fərda Əsəd oğlu Qədirov; Georgian: ფარდა ასად ოღლუ გადიროვი, romanized: parda asad oghlu gadirovi; 8 December 1980 – 30 April 2009), a Georgian citizen of Azerbaijani descent, was identified as the perpetrator of the shooting.

Gadirov was born in the village of Dashtapa near Marneuli. He spent most of his life in Podolsk, Russia, after his uncle invited him to help him in business but for unknown reasons returned to Baku. An official from his home village, Vidadi Hasanov, described Gadirov as an unsociable child who rarely left his home during his brief return.

Messages found on Gadirov's mobile phone after the shootings described himself as a "lone wolf." One message said: "There is no love for me, only hate. I am coming to Baku, I will shoot everyone I meet regardless of their age. I will not give up to the police. I will experience the pleasure of killing." Photographs found at the gunman's home in neighbouring Georgia showed him posing with a pistol. They were signed "Lone Wolf" and "My every step is death".

== International reaction ==
In the aftermath of the shootings, 15 countries and the European Union expressed condolences.

- President of Belarus Alexander Lukashenko in a letter to Ilham Aliyev expressed "deep condolences and sympathies to the families of the deceased".
- The Foreign Minister of the Czech Republic Karel Schwarzenberg offered deep condolence to the families of the tragic event victims: "The tragic loss of life and wounds of young people in the Azerbaijan State Oil Academy deeply saddened me" letter of condolence to Azerbaijani Foreign Minister Elmar Mammadyarov said.
- Deputy chairman of the Estonian Parliament Kristiina Ojuland expressed the condolences.
- In the Council of Europe's press release, EU Special Representative for the South Caucasus Peter Semneby has expressed condolences to the Azerbaijani people.
- The French Foreign Ministry said in its address: "We were very sorry to hear about an armed attack this morning at the Azerbaijan State Oil Academy, killing 13 and injuring many others. We strongly condemn this act of violence".
- The Georgian Foreign Ministry stated that "the Georgian side unequivocally condemns this criminal act and expresses hope that the investigation will bring to light all details of the incident". Governor of Kvemo Kartli province Davit Kirkitadze also offered condolences to the people and President of Azerbaijan: "We, Georgians and Azerbaijanis, were always together in our happiness and grieve. I sorrow for this tragic event. This event grieved Georgians too as it hurt the heart of every Azerbaijani. We have to share our grieves as we share our happiness".
- The Iranian embassy in Baku said: "We feel deep sorrow over the tragic incident that occurred in Azerbaijan State Oil Academy on 30 April. We grieve deeply as the victims of this terrible crime are students, young people".
- As in the condolence letter, the "Iraqi embassy in Azerbaijan was very deeply saddened by the news of the murder of innocent teachers and students in the Azerbaijan State Oil Academy and condemns this act".
- The Israeli Minister of Foreign Affairs Avigdor Lieberman condemned this violent act and mourn, together with our friends in Azerbaijan, this tragic loss of life of these young people and all the victims of this horrible event.
- President Valdis Zatlers addressed Ilham Aliyev. "The Latvian people share deep sorrow of Azerbaijanis", said in the condolences.
- The Minister of Foreign Affairs Jonas Gahr Støre offered his condolences in a letter to Azeri Foreign Minister Elmar Mammadyarov.
- President Dmitry Medvedev said: "I am deeply shocked by news about the tragedy that took place on 30 April in Azerbaijan State Oil Academy in Baku. Our common grief is redoubled by the fact the victims of this monstrous crime were students, young people, who were full of vital plans."
- President Abdullah Gül and Prime Minister Recep Tayyip Erdoğan of Turkey expressed their condolences.
- Ukrainian President Viktor Yuschenko expressed his condolences.
- David Miliband and Prince Andrew, Duke of York expressed their condolences to the victims. Prince Andrew said that in these difficult days, he is together with Azerbaijan.
- The U.S. Department of State spokesperson Robert Wood said on 30 April: "On behalf of the Department of State I wish to express our sympathy and solidarity with the people of Azerbaijan in the aftermath of the tragic shooting today at the State Oil Academy in Baku. We extend our sincerest condolences to the families and friends of those killed in the incident and we wish a speedy recovery to those wounded. The United States is standing in solidarity with Azerbaijan, our friend and strategic partner, in this time of shock and sadness".

== Commemoration restriction ==
Commemoration of the events were restricted by government on 30 April 2010. Around the place were placed Azerbaijan Police in uniforms and plainclothes. In 2012 a group of young people who tried to pay tribute to the memory of the victims on the third anniversary of the shooting was blocked and its members were beaten by the police.

== See also ==
- List of attacks related to post-secondary schools
