= Yunnan University =

Provincial public university in Kunming, Yunnan, China

Coordinates: 25°03′38″N 102°42′34″E

- 云南大学
- Other name: Yunda
- Motto: 自尊 致知 正义 力行
- Motto in English: Perfection in Moral Integrity, Excellence in Scholarly Attainments, and Greatness in Career Pursuits
- Type: Public
- Established: December 1922; 103 years ago
- Academic affiliations: Project 211; Greater Mekong Sub-region Academic and Research Network
- President: Fang Jingyun
- Administrative staff: 2,372
- Students: 31,141
- Undergraduates: 16,330
- Postgraduates: 14,811
- Doctoral students: 94
- Location: Kunming, Yunnan, China
- Campus: Urban
- Colours: Navy blue & white
- Website: www.ynu.edu.cn

Chinese name
- Simplified Chinese: 云南大学
- Traditional Chinese: 雲南大學
Transcriptions
Standard Mandarin
- Hanyu Pinyin: Yúnnán Dàxué

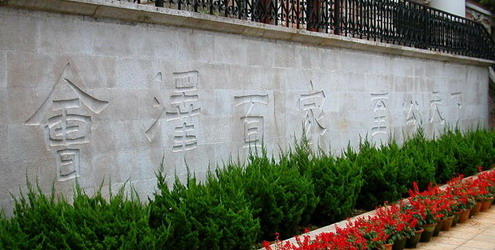
"Spirit" of Yunnan University

Yunnan University (YNU; 云南大学) is a provincial public university in Kunming, Yunnan, China.It is affiliated with the province of Yunnan, and co-funded by the Yunnan Provincial People's Government and the Ministry of Education of China. The university is part of Project 211 and the Double First-Class Construction.

Founded in December 1922, Yunnan University started to enroll in April 1923. It began as a privately run institution called the "University of the Eastern Land" and its name has changed six times since then. Yunnan University has also been included on the list of the key national universities for the "China Western Development" program.

== History ==
=== 1922-49 ===
Yunnan University was founded on 8 December 1922 by General Tang Jiyao, the warlord who controlled Yunnan Province in the 1920s. The university began to enroll students on April 20, 1923. It started as the privately run "Dong Lu University" (Dong Lu means "Eastern Road" or "Eastern Land"). The name has changed six times in the past 80 years, but the present name dates from 1934. It is known locally as "Yunda". Following typical abbreviations for Chinese universities, "Yun" is an abbreviation of "Yunnan" and "da" is an abbreviation of daxue, the Chinese word for "university".

Yunnan University became famous during World War II. Since Kunming was not directly involved in the fighting, a great many excellent Chinese scholars, in particular from Beijing and Nanjing, many of these with PhDs from well-known American universities, retreated from the northern war zone. Most of them taught at a newly created National Southwestern Associated University (also called "Lianda"). Several of them, however, for various reasons, ended up teaching at Yunnan University. There they found a distinct French influence. The president of Yunnan University had a PhD from the Sorbonne. The university is also famous for its French language and civilization research. The present of the school of foreign language is honored as "Chevalier des Palmes Académiques" (knight of academic golden Palm) in 2011.

From 1937 through to 1947, the noted mathematician Professor Xiong Qinglai was invited to become the President of Yunnan University, under whose leadership Yunnan University was restructured along the same academic model as Tsinghua University. A cluster of famous scholars, such as Fei Xiaotong, Chu Tunan, Chen Xingshen, Hua Luogen, Yan Jici, Feng Youlan, Lü Shuxiang came to teach at Yunnan University, and thus gradually turned the institution into a general university that had exerted a certain degree of academic influence at home and abroad. In 1946, Yunnan University had five faculties and 18 academic departments, and was included in the Concise Encyclopædia Britannica as one of the fifteen most prestigious universities in China.

=== 1950-present ===
During the early 1950s, the government began reforming the Chinese education system which had affected every university. Most departments were weeded out, and by 1958, there were only two faculties and six academic departments left in Yunnan University. Again like all other Chinese universities, Yunnan experienced a difficult period from the mid-1960s to the mid-1970s due to events such as the Cultural Revolution. However, the situation improved remarkably thereafter when the reform era began in the late 1970s.

According to his confession, biochemistry student Ma Jiajue killed his four university roommates between February 13 and 15 in 2004. On February 23 of that year, the bodies were discovered in a dormitory closet at the university. The Intermediate People's Court of Kunming sentenced Ma Jiajue to death. On June 17, 2004, he was executed.

== Environment ==
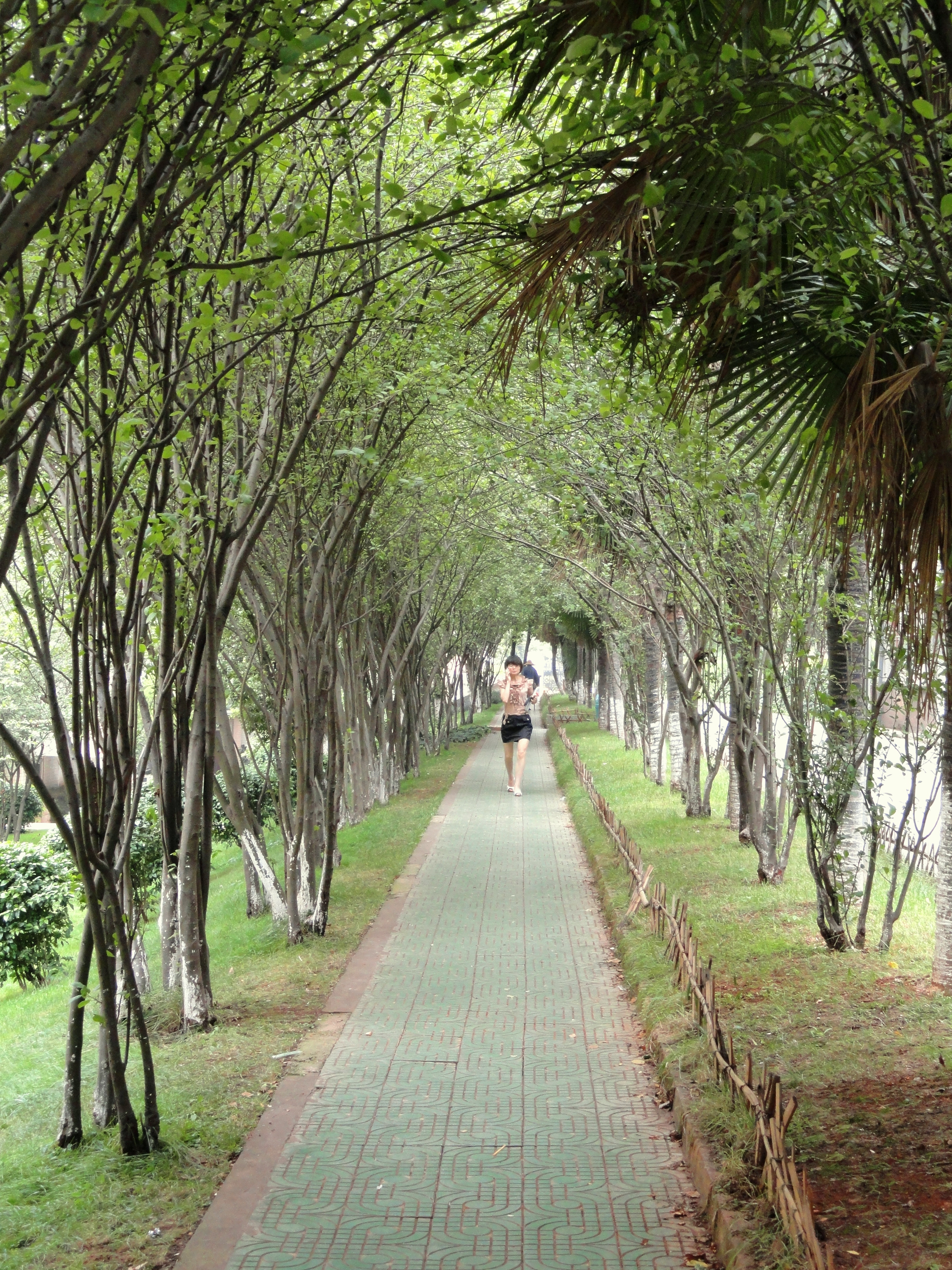
Walkway at Yunnan University

Yunnan University is situated in the city of Kunming, the provincial capital of Yunnan noted for its mild climate. The university occupies an area of 426,669 sq m, of which 350,000 sq m are built up with teaching, library and research facilities. Its main campus faces the Green Lake Park, a winter haunt for the Siberian black-headed gull. The campus is covered with the green shade of ginkgo and is surrounded by stretches of cherry and plum trees. The university is also next to the Yuantong Hill, a zoological park known for its rare animal and bird species.

== Curricula ==
Yunnan University has now developed into a National Key University with a large group of academic professionals offering courses covered by a comprehensive curricula in the fields of the liberal arts, law, science, technology, economics, and management.

Students studying on the campus of Yunnan University have reached 19,872, of whom 9,919 are full-time undergraduates, 2,853 are postgraduates (94 are studying for their doctorate, 684 are studying for their master's, 1,842 are studying advanced postgraduate courses, 170 are studying for their degrees in the specialist law programs, and 63 are studying for their degrees in the advanced class for teaching), and 7,100 are students under night-class and correspondence programs.

== Faculty and staff ==
Yunnan University retains a faculty and working staff of 2,372 persons, and among them 1,981 persons are the specialized professionals. 222 persons are full professors, 409 are associate professors, and 987 are full-time instructors. 683 instructors have an obtained a doctorate or master's degree.

== Academic departments ==
Yunnan University currently has the following schools, colleges and institutes under its administration:

- School of Economy
- School of Adult Education
- School of Humanity and Liberal Arts
- School of Materials and Energy
- School of Life Science
- School of Ecology and Environment
- School of Information
- School of Earth Sciences
- Institute for Development Research
- School of Occupational Technology
- School of Law
- School of Public Management
- School of Business Administration and Tourism Management
- School of Foreign Languages
- International College of Modern Design Arts
- School of Medicine
- School of International Relations
- School of International Cultures
- School of Tourism and Culture (at Lijiang)
- School of Software Engineering
- Institute for Palaeontology (inherited from Yunnan Key Laboratory for Palaeobiology)

In these schools, colleges and institutes there are more than 30 teaching departments and divisions that offer 65 major fields of study for the four-year programs for undergraduates to obtain baccalaureates.

Additionally, Yunnan University also has 16 centers for research and development, 25 research institutes, ten research offices, and four teaching-oriented service centers.

In the above-described major fields of study, History, Biology, Mathematical Science are established for the purpose of training teaching and research professionals at the national level (and Yunnan University is applying to the Ministry of Education for its approval to set up a state-level experimental base for the comprehensive quality training in liberal arts.) Yunnan University also has established a state-level base for training professional teachers.

Among its disciplinary branches, Yunnan University has two key state-level disciplinary groups under the current construction, sixteen key provincial-level disciplines, four doctorate degree conferring points, one post-doctorate-degree-related mobile station, forty-eight master's degree conferring points, three specialized degree (law, occupational education and MBA) conferring points, one state-level center for new product research and development, and one key laboratory of the Ministry of Education.

== Publishing house ==
Yunnan University has a publishing house which has produced over two million volumes of various academic works. Yunnan University's academic periodical Ideological Frontier (Social Science Version) has obtained the status of the "Kernel National Periodicals", and the Academic Journal of Yunnan University (Natural Science Version) has been judged as an excellent academic journal of the key national universities and colleges.

University rankings

Global – Overall
- ARWU World: 301-400 (2025)
- USNWR Global: 615 (2026)

Regional – Overall
- USNWR Asia: 210 (2025)

National – Overall
- BCUR National: 69 (2025)

== Scientific research ==
Yunnan University has from the very beginning attached great importance to the pursuit of scientific research, closely following international disciplines. It is, for example, a leader in ecology. Its Institute of Ecology and Geobotany has produced nationally utilized texts on plant community classification and plant ecology. ("Geobotany" is a term from Russian and continental European science that entails classifying and analyzing the geographical distribution of the flora of a province or nation; it is called "Phytogeography" in English-speaking countries).

== Rankings and reputation ==
Yunnan University is consistently ranked the best in Yunnan Province and among the top 100 nationwide. As of 2025, Yunnan University was ranked 301-400th globally by the Academic Ranking of World Universities (ARWU). The 2024 CWTS Leiden Ranking ranked Yunnan University at 527th in the world based on their publications for the period 2019–2022. The Nature Index 2024 Annual Tables by Nature Research ranked YNU among the top 250 leading research universities globally for the high quality of research publications in natural science.

== Campuses ==
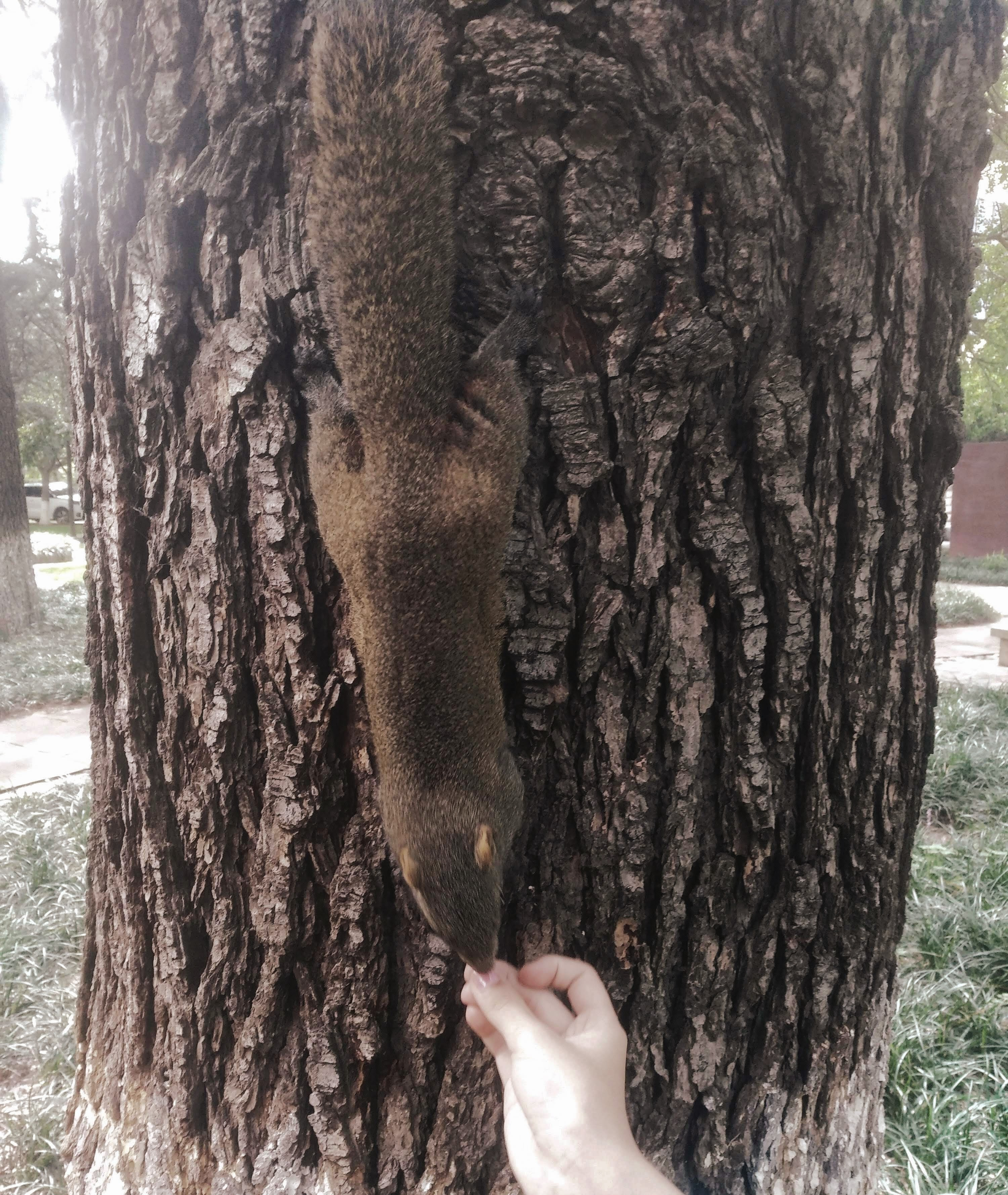
Squirrel-feeding at Donglu Campus

Due to the limited ability to expand in the center of the city, the university has recently developed a second main campus at Chenggong, roughly a 45-minute bus or subway ride from its original campus. Its first year of operation was the 2010–2011 academic year, though the campus has expanded considerably since then.

- Donglu Campus (东陆校区), the old campus of YNU which is located in the city centre near Cuihu Lake (Green Lake). It has many old buildings and status, for example the Huize building.
- Chenggong Campus (呈贡校区), the new campus of YNU which is located in University Town of Kunming, where is part of the Chenggong district. This Campus used in 2009 when first undergraduate student started moved into here from other Campus. This campus is a much larger campus than its counterpart at Green Lake, which is being retained as the focus of graduate study.

Lijiang Culture and Tourism College (丽江文化旅游学院; Lìjiāng Wénhuà Lǚyóu Xuéyuàn) in Lijiang was formerly a branch campus of that university.

== Library ==
There are two libraries in YNU, old one locates in Donglu Campus, while the new and the largest one locates in Chenggong Campus.

library houses a collection of over 1.2 million books, some of which are rare copies of valuable historical literature. Access, cataloging, circulation, and public retrieval are under a computerized network management system.

== Herbarium ==
The university has a sizable herbarium, believed to be the second oldest in the province after the Kunming Institute of Botany. The herbarium specializes in the Pteridophytes of China, especially those of southwestern China. It has for many years been directed by Chu Weiming.

== Technology transfer ==
On April 27, 1998, the Yunnan University Science and Technology Corporation shares were issued on the stock markets in China, and Yunnan University has become the eighth among more than 1,000 higher education institutes in China that own their share-issuing hi-tech companies or corporations.

The popularization and application of the major product Yunda-120 growth regulator produced by the Science and Technology Corporation has reached 67 billion square meters in terms of use in cultivated areas.

Within a brief period, the corporation, starting from a research group that had only a fund of a little more than 10,000 yuan, has developed into a share-issuing corporation with a total value in excess of 10 billion yuan.

Biological Technology Corporation of Yunnan University is the first enterprise in China that owns an independent intellectual property right in the field of the single clone antibody research, and its products of contraceptive test paper, and sterility test paper have been adopted for codifying China's national standards.

== Affiliated schools ==
Yunnan University also has a secondary school, a secondary school of foreign language and a kindergarten affiliated to it.

== Fund ==
The Yunnan University Fund is an acting council member of the Fund of Universities and Colleges of China. Through its development Yunnan University Fund has now held nearly seventy Chinese and overseas directors. They have brought many scholars who have promoted the reform, construction and development of Yunnan University.

== International cooperation ==
In recent years, Yunda has established different levels of exchange relations with more than 50 institutions of higher learning and research organizations in more than twenty countries and regions such as United States, Great Britain, Russia, Japan, Australia, etc.

== See also ==
- Higher education in China
- List of universities in China
