= Ma Jiajue incident =

2004 mass murder at Yunnan University, China

- Clockwise from top right: Yang Kaihong, Tang Xueli, Shao Rujie, and Gong Bo
- Location: Yunnan University, Kunming, Yunnan, China
- Date: 13–15 February 2004
- Weapon: Hammer
- Deaths: 4
- Perpetrator: Ma Jiajue
- Convictions: Murder

Between 13 and 15 February 2004, four Yunnan University students were fatally bludgeoned in a dormitory residence in Kunming, Yunnan, China. The perpetrator, fellow student Ma Jiajue, was arrested in March 2004 after the murders were discovered. Ma was convicted of four counts of murder in April 2004 and executed in June of the same year.

The murders, dubbed the "Ma Jiajue incident" ("马加爵事件"/"马加爵案") and formally known the "Yunnan University "2.23" murder case" ("云南大学"2.23"血案"), gained significant media attention and was commonly brought up in reports on later university-related killings. Academic interest focused on the effect on student mental health the killings had at universities around China.

== Background ==
=== Victims ===
Shao Ruijie (simplified Chinese: 邵瑞杰; traditional Chinese: 邵瑞傑; pinyin: Shào Ruìjié), born 11 January 1980, was from Guteng village, Cangwu County, Guangxi Region. Shao was the roommate of Ma Jiajue, sharing room 317, located in Building 6 of Dingxin Apartments, at Yunnan University's northern campus.

Tang Xueli (唐学李; 唐學李; Táng Xuélǐ), born 11 June 1980, was from Chongren village, Lushui County, Yunnan Province. Tang, an ethnic Bai, was an off-campus resident in Xishan district and a friend of Shao. He moved into room 317 during the 2004 winter semester.

Yang Kaihong (杨开红; 楊開紅; Yáng Kāihóng), born 15 April 1982, was from Hongtangzi village, Kaiyuan, Yunnan. Yang, an ethnic Miao, was a fellow Building 6 resident, residing in room 316, and friend of Ma. As he originated from an impoverished background as an ethnic minority, he was not required to pay tuition fees, also receiving financial support from Kaiyuan City Committee for Concern for the Next Generation. Yang was six months away from graduation.

Gong Bo (龚博; 龔博; Gōng Bó), born 12 June 1983, was from Dingjiazhuang village, Mian County, Shaanxi Province. He was a resident of Building 5, a neighbouring dormitory complex, and a shared friend of Ma and Shao.

=== Perpetrator ===
Undated photo of Ma used during the manhunt

Ma Jiajue (马加爵; 馬加爵; Mǎ Jiājué), born 4 May 1981, was from Maer village, Binyang County, Guangxi. He had an older brother and two sisters. He attended Binzhou Middle School for junior high school, achieving good grades and winning second place in a physics competition. At Binyang Middle School for high school, his academic effort diminished and he was reported as withdrawn.

In November 1999 he ran away from home out of fear that he would not be able to pass the gaokao college entrance exam. He was discovered by police in Guigang in eastern Guangxi after his school reported his disappearance, and received a disciplinary punishment upon his return. After passing his gaokao, Ma, the pride of his family, was given his family's meager savings; he enrolled in Yunnan University in September 2000.

All five hailed from financially disadvantaged farming families and were studying biochemistry in the same class at Yunnan University's School of Life Sciences. The group were considered good friends and spent most of their free time together. Shao, Tang, and Gong were known for being social while Yang and Ma were considered introverts. Other students recalled that Ma and Shao were prone to having disagreements during casual arguments, which never led to lasting tension.

==== Motive ====
In his confession, Ma claimed that on 10 February, several days before the murders, he, Shao Ruijie, and several other classmates had played a game of cards. Ma stated that Shao had accused him of cheating, calling him a "bad person" and remarking "No wonder Gong Bo didn't invite you to his birthday party". Ma considered Shao his best friend and immediately plotted his murder. Ma also decided to kill Gong Bo based on Shao's comment, as well as Tang Xueli, seeing the third roommate as a potential obstacle. Ma also said that the later victims had bullied him regarding his plans for the Chinese New Year holiday, as his work kept Ma from having much leisure.

In an episode of Behind the Headlines with Wen Tao, aired on the night of 1 October 2013, criminal psychologist Li Meijin said that Shao had revealed Ma's secret habit of soliciting sex workers and that this was the actual reason behind the murders.

== Murders ==
=== Preparation ===
Ma used the Internet to search for murder methods that caused little bleeding. He also looked up geographic information for several Chinese provinces and accessed the official Ministry of Public Security website. Ma concluded that the best murder weapon would be a hammer and purchased a stonemason's hammer at a flea market, asking the vendor to shorten the handle for easier use. He planted the hammer in a public bathroom within his dorm building, but after finding that someone had taken the tool from its hiding place, Ma got a second one with the same specifications. Ma also bought black plastic bags and tape to hide the bodies and through Internet instructions, he made a fake identity card in the name "Chen Fenlian" to aid in his escape. Additional online searches included gore sites, information on wildlife survival techniques, and train schedules.

=== Killings ===
On the evening of 13 February, Ma was alone in room 317 with Tang Xueli. Ma snuck up on Tang and fatally bludgeoned him in the head. Ma wrapped Tang's body in a plastic bag, sealed it with tape, and placed it in the room's closet. On 14 February, Shao Ruijie returned and while he was washing up, Ma killed Shao in the same manner, putting his body in the closet with Tang's. The same day, Ma met with Lin Feng, a fellow student from Guangxi, and had lunch with him. According to his own account, Ma did not kill Lin since he was treated nicely.

At noon on 15 February, Yang Kaihong entered room 317 to play cards with Ma, inadvertently discovering him moving the body bags. Ma killed Yang by striking him in the back of the head while distracted, fearing that he would have called the police. Ma then went to two banks, withdrawing 350 yuan and 100 yuan at each location. The same night, Ma went to the dormitory building of Gong Bo and under the false pretext of inviting him to a card game with the others, Gong was lured to room 317, where Ma killed him. A considerable amount of Ma's blood was later found in the room by the police, indicating that he had been injured in a struggle with Gong. According to Ma, he did not sleep for three days due to chronic fear after killing Tang and that he took care to cover the heads of all bodies with plastic bags so they would not look at him during the process.

After wrapping up all four bodies, covering them in newspaper, and locking them in the closet, Ma went to Kunming railway station, where he boarded a train to Guangzhou in Guangdong Province. Police found Ma's forged ID at Kunming station.

Tang's disappearance was first noticed by his girlfriend, who had a date scheduled with him for Valentine's Day. After failing to reach him by phone on 14 and 15 February, she went to Yunnan University's School of Life Sciences campus on 16 February to ask other students about Tang's whereabouts. Classmates subsequently also noted that Tang's friends Yang, Shao, and Ma were also missing. Gong's disappearance came to the attention of university staff on 20 February, which was semester registration day, when a search of his dormitory only found Gong's roommate, who had returned that same day. As all five of them were considered a close friend group, it was assumed that they had gone on a trip together. Some teachers suspected that the five had been abducted while looking for jobs.

On 23 February, two students who had returned after the holidays moved into room 317. Noticing an unpleasant smell, the students started cleaning the room, eventually discovering a trail of liquid oozing from under the closet door. They immediately alerted campus security, who pried open the wardrobe and found the decomposing bodies. The university then called Kunming Public Security Bureau. They quickly identified the bodies and found the murder weapon in the same closet. The still missing Ma Jiajue was first considered a potential fifth victim, but he became the main suspect after the hammer was found, with a bloody fingerprint matched to him.

=== Manhunt ===
Via Guangzhou, Zhanjiang, and Haikou, Ma arrived in Sanya, Hainan Province, 900 kilometres (560 mi) away from the crime scene, on the evening of 18 February. He integrated into a group of homeless waste collectors and slept on the street. He carried the ID cards of Shao and Gong, a cassette player and three foreign language cassettes along with him, using the device to record his motive. Although he had a total of 2,400 yuan on him, Ma did not spend it after becoming aware of the police search and instead ate food discarded in the trash. Ma bought another ten blank cassettes to make messages to his friends and family, but stopped after recording two.

The Ministry of Public Security offered a 200,000 yuan (US$24,000) reward for information that would result in his apprehension. On 15 March, taxi driver Chen Xianzhuang reported a sighting of Ma at a farmer's market. Ma was captured at the nearby Sanya River, after 21 days as a fugitive. In addition to the 200,000 yuan reward, Chen received a 50,000 yuan bonus by the Sanya Municipal Administration. Chen donated part of the reward and used another portion to pay for the university tuition of his younger brother.

In custody, Ma initially refused to talk and pretended to have mental issues. After receiving a bath and food, Ma became cooperative and participated in interrogation.

== Legal proceedings and execution ==
On 22 April 2004, the trial of Ma Jiajue began, charging him with four counts of murder at the Intermediate People's Court of Kunming. Ma voiced regret for his actions, but also acknowledged that he had no intention of turning himself in while on the run. Additionally, the parents of Shao, Tang, and Yang filed civil lawsuits against Ma, demanding 350,000 yuan, 310,000 yuan and 160,000 yuan respectively; the family of Gong declined to participate in the civil suit, believing Ma would be unable to pay. On 28 April, it was ruled that Ma would pay the three families 20,000 yuan each. After the trial, the families received a cash fund from public donors.

On 24 April, Ma was sentenced to death. The families of the victims did not attend the sentencing date and instead solely represented by their lawyers, as they were already satisfied with hearing Ma's motive and had anticipated capital punishment anyway. The Yunnan Provincial Higher People's Court did an automatic review of the verdict, and upheld it. On 17 June 2004, Ma was executed.

== Legacy ==
In 2004, Xinhua stated: "The murder case has attracted nationwide attention, with experts and ordinary people heatedly discussing how a college student could choose to kill his young schoolmates."

Journalists Wu Qi and Cheng Yifeng of Sanlian Lifeweek wrote a report on Ma's profile entitled "The Three Worlds of Ma Jiajue" ("马加爵的三重世界").

Between 29 March and 8 April 2004, Ma's family travelled through China to visit victims' homes and personally apologise to their families for the actions of Ma Jiajue, and pay their respects at the grave sites. All four families accepted the apologies, with the Tang family politely declining an offer of kou tou, but accepting a written apology letter during the visit.

Yunnan University hired additional mental health counselors and held a series of lectures on mental health and interpersonal relationships. In the 2004 autumn semester, the university conducted its first mental health survey for freshmen.

On 10 April 2004, the Gong family stated that they intended to sue Yunnan University for negligence. Gong's parents said that they learnt during a meeting with other parents that the girlfriend of Tang Xueli had contacted university personnel the day after her boyfriend's disappearance, but no actions was undertaken. It was argued that since Tang was the first victim, an immediate search conducted on 14 February would have led to the discovery of the murder and prevented the other three deaths.

The four affected families received compensation and insurance payments by Yunnan University. The parents of Yang Kaihong complained that they had received only 63,000 yuan while the families of Shao Ruijie and Gong Bo received 115,000 yuan and 100,000 yuan respectively. Yang's father stated that the university had acknowledged the issue and promised to redistribute the payments for equal sums, but received no response later on. Shao's father noted that no insurance pay was given in their case.

== See also ==
- List of school attacks in China
- 2022 Idaho student murders, killing of four university roommates
