= OAED Vocational College shooting =

School shooting on April 10, 2009

Coordinates: 37°58′33.28″N 23°40′44.68″E

- OAED Vocational College shooting (Piraeus)
- Location: Agios Ioannis Renti, Athens, Greece
- Date: Friday, April 10, 2009; Approximately 08:30 a.m. (UTC+3)
- Attack type: School shooting
- Weapons: Two converted blank pistols: Ekol Sava Magnum; Zoraki Model 914; Hunting knife
- Deaths: 1 (the perpetrator)
- Injuries: 3
- Perpetrator: Dimitris Patmanidis
- Motive: Bullying

The OAED Vocational College shooting was a school shooting that took place on April 10, 2009, at the Manpower Employment Organisation of Greece (OAED)‛s vocational training school (Greek: Σχολή Μαθητείας) in the Agios Ioannis Renti suburb of Athens, Greece. A gunman shot one student and two civilians before fatally shooting himself in a nearby park. He was a 19-year-old ethnically Greek student from Abkhazia, Georgia, named Dimitris Patmanidis (Greek: Δημήτρης Πατμανίδης) who was studying car electronics at the school. The incident is the only school shooting to have occurred in Greece so far.

== Shooting ==
At 8:30 a.m. UTC+3, about fifteen minutes after the beginning of the lessons, Dimitris Patmanidis arrived at the building housing the OAED vocational school armed with two loaded handguns, which were modified replicas of sound pistols which have been converted into firearms, and a hunting knife. Inside the building Patmanidis approached 18-year-old student Dimitris Kokkinis, who had arrived late to school, and shot him three times.

Patmanidis then turned to leave the school and was confronted by two workers from a nearby technical company who were alerted by the gunfire. They asked him what has happened and he shot both of them, from a 150m distance. The gunman then ran to a nearby park where he attempted suicide by shooting himself in the head. He was carried in a critical condition to the Nikaia General Hospital where he later died.

The 18-year-old student Dimitris Kokkinis, who was shot three times in the chest, leg, and hand, was carried in a serious condition to the Nikaia General Hospital, where he was prolongly operated. The two others were slightly injured, the one in the hand and the other in the leg. During the assault, the gunman shot 15 bullets of the 83 he had in the pistols, his pockets and his bag, before the assault.

Shooting victims
1. Dimitris Kokkinis, age 18, student.
2. Kostas Papadopoulos, age 23, worker.
3. Topali Fatmili, age 47, worker.

== Motive ==
According to a police spokesman "It seems his motive was revenge." The police also estimates that his act was planned. A note found in Patmanidis's bag after the incident said that he couldn't take any more the rejection he felt. A friend of Patmanidis, said he was tired of being mocked by other pupils, for his styled appearance and behaviour.

"...I have no reason to continue to live. I am too selfish to die and let you live.
Before I die, I will deprive the most precious thing you have. I have no
respect for human life. Anyone found in front of me the morning of 10 April
2009, will die, without exception... So far I have not experienced anything else,
despite the rejection..." — Part of the perpetrator's note.

His act was announced in his page at MySpace with a brief note same to that found in his bag. In his profile also, Patmanidis had posted photos of him posing with guns.

== Aftermath ==
OAED administration, informed that immediately after the tragic incident, a group psychologists was sent to support students of the college.

== See also ==
- List of school-related attacks
