= 2024 Wuxi stabbing =

Mass stabbing at Wuxi Vocational College, Jiangsu, China

- Location: 31.3410°N 119.8287°E; Wuxi Vocational Institute of Arts and Technology, Yixing, Wuxi, Jiangsu, China
- Date: 16 November 2024; 23 months ago c. 6:30 p.m. – c. 7:10 p.m. (China Standard Time)
- Target: Students
- Attack type: Mass stabbing
- Weapon: Knife
- Deaths: 8
- Injuries: 17
- Perpetrator: Xu Jiajin
- Motive: Being owed wages by his employer factory; Anger over not receiving graduation certificate

On 16 November 2024, a mass stabbing took place at the Wuxi Vocational Institute of Arts and Technology in Yixing, China. Eight people were killed, and 17 others were injured. The perpetrator, former student Xu Jiajin, was executed two months later.

== Background ==
The Wuxi Vocational Institute of Arts and Technology is a full-time public general professional college located in Wuxi, Jiangsu Province. According to the college profile, it occupies nearly 1,000 square meters of land and has a building area of about 290,000 square meters.

Chinese law requires all vocational college undergraduates to work for a semester or more. During such a period, some schools will act as foremen and send students to factories in need of workers. Student workers in this industry receive a lower hourly wage of 16 yuan, compared to the 24 yuan salary of regular part-time workers.

== Incident ==
The attack took place at the on-campus dormitory area behind the main building. Over the course of less than an hour, several stabbings were reported between the campus west gate and the dormitory buildings.

The attack began at the western campus entrance, which was continued at the nearby entrance of the campus library. Two more stabbings occurred inside the ground floor bathroom of No. 11 male dormitory and the ground floor of No. 12 male dormitory. According to media sources, the assailant then hid in bushes before entering female dormitories No. 7 to 9 and stabbing students indiscriminately. Pictures of the scene showed victims on the ground with blood on their clothes. Some students said that their roommates were stabbed and told others not to go out. Many students hid in their rooms and barricaded their doors with bookshelves to prevent the murderer from breaking in.

Several police cars and ambulances were parked outside the college, and police officers entered with shields in hand. The assailant confronted the police at the college sports field with knives, and they pointed flashlights at the assailant. A police officer subdued him while he was on his side, as several male students also came forward to help.

At around 11:30 p.m. that night, the Yixing City Public Security Bureau reported that the assailant had been arrested on the spot and admitted to the crime. Some of the injured were sent to the new campus of Yixing People's Hospital.

== Victims ==
25 people were stabbed in total. Eight of the victims, two men and six women aged 18 to 19, died of their injuries. The remains of the deceased, all of whom were from outside of Yixing, were repatriated to their hometowns for burial by 21 November 2024.

== Perpetrator ==
The perpetrator was identified as Xu Jiajin (Chinese: 徐加金), a 21-year-old recent graduate of the college.

=== Motive ===
According to police, the perpetrator was a 2024 graduate of the college and had failed his exams. He allegedly confessed "without hesitation" to committing the attack due to anger over not receiving his graduation certificate, poor exam results, and "dissatisfaction with internship compensation".

An alleged suicide note of the perpetrator circulating on social media included the statement that he was owed wages by a factory he was working at and that the college had withheld his diploma, preventing him from graduating. It also included statements such as "I hope that my death will lead to the advancement of labor laws" and "long live the proletariat".

== Aftermath ==
Due to the attack occurring five days after the Zhuhai car ramming, the incident received worldwide media attention. Bouquets of flowers were placed at one entrance of the college but were later removed by security. Chinese authorities censored online discussion of the attack; the only information on the Chinese internet about the attack is the official police report.

Reporters tried to interview the school's principal but received the response that they were busy. The Jiangsu Provincial Committee of the Chinese Communist Party, led by Xin Changxing, held a meeting and later issued a notice that police forces must pay high attention to the incident and that surveillance in crowded areas must be strengthened.

Xu was sentenced to death on 17 December 2024 and was executed on 20 January 2025, the same day as Fan Weiqiu, who committed the aforementioned Zhuhai car attack.

== See also ==
- 2024 Shanghai supermarket stabbings
- 2024 Zhuhai car attack
- List of school attacks in China
