= 2025 University of Warsaw attack =

Warsaw University Axe Attack

University of Warsaw axe attack
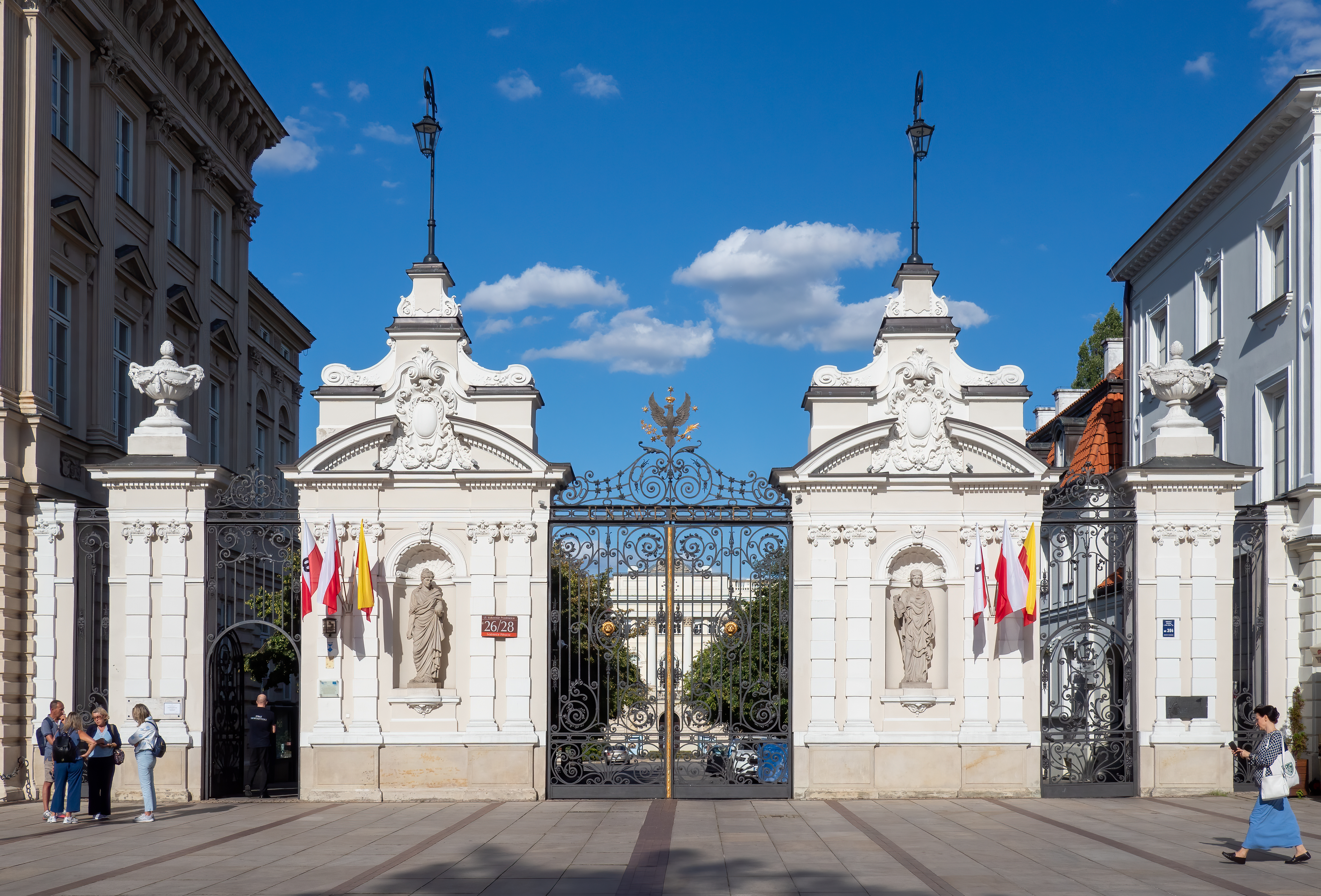
- Where the attack took place
- Location: University of Warsaw, Warsaw, Poland
- Date: 7 May 2025 c. 6:40 p.m. CEST
- Attack type: Axe murder
- Weapon: Axe
- Deaths: 1
- Injuries: 1
- Motive: Psychotic break
- Accused: Mieszko Ruciński
- Charges: Murder; Attempted murder

On 7 May 2025, an axe attack took place at the University of Warsaw in Warsaw, Poland. A 53-year-old female porter Małgorzata Dynak was killed, and a 39-year-old security guard who intervened was seriously injured.

The suspect, 22-year-old second-year law student Mieszko Ruciński, was detained at the scene by police. The motive for the attack remains under investigation.

== Attack ==
On the morning of 7 May 2025, at around 9:30 a.m. CEST, a 22-year-old law student supposedly entered the University of Warsaw's historic central campus armed with an axe.

According to witnesses, the assailant first attacked a 53-year-old female porter near the entrance of the university building around 6:40 p.m. CEST. She was struck multiple times and died at the scene from her injuries.

A 39-year-old security guard attempted to intervene and was allegedly attacked by the suspect. The guard sustained serious head and upper-body injuries and was hospitalized in critical condition. He later stabilized and was discharged from hospital to continue his recovery at home.

Police arrived quickly at the scene and apprehended the suspect without further casualties. University authorities evacuated nearby buildings and suspended classes for the remainder of the day.

== Trial ==
The suspect, a 22-year-old law student, was taken into custody immediately after the attack. Prosecutors charged him with murder and attempted murder under Polish criminal law. He was placed in pre-trial detention by order of the Warsaw district court.

Authorities also ordered psychiatric assessments to determine the suspect's fitness to stand trial.

On 28 August 2026, the court decided to dismiss the case as the result of the evaluation, as Mieszko has been found to be unable to stand trial for the reason of being in the state of psychosis during the attack. He was institutionalised indefinitely within a high-security psychiatric unit.

== Aftermath ==
The University of Warsaw declared three days of mourning following the attack, lowering flags to half-mast and cancelling academic events. A funeral was held for the slain employee on 13 May 2025, attended by university staff, students, and government representatives.

Polish officials condemned the attack, and the Ministry of National Education pledged to review campus security measures nationwide. The university also increased the number of security staff and implemented new access control measures at its central campus.

== See also ==
- University of Warsaw
