= Wuxi Vocational Institute of Arts and Technology =

Public college in Wuxi, China

Coordinates: 31.343°N 119.832°E

- Motto: Be kind and sincere, learn and practice
- Type: Public
- Established: 1958
- Location: Wuxi, Jiangsu, China
- Website: www.digiedupro.com/wuxi-institute-of-technology/

Wuxi Vocational Institute of Arts and Technology (Chinese: 无锡工艺职业技术学院) is a public full-time general college located in Wuxi, Jiangsu Province, China.

== History ==
Founded in 1933, the school was named Jiangsu Yixing Ceramics Vocational School. In 1958, it was renamed Taodu University of Technology.

It became part of the Jiangsu Yixing Ceramics Industrial School in 1959.

In 1985, it was renamed Jiangsu Yixing Light Industry School (Yixing Lixin Accounting School).

In 2004, the Wuxi Institute of Technology was established from a merger of the Yixing Light Industry School and Jiangsu Radio and Television University Yixing College. The Yixing Light Industry School was abolished.

On 16 November 2024, eight people were killed at the campus in the 2024 Wuxi stabbing attack.
