= Sukanta Bhattacharya =

Bengali poet and revolutionary (1926–1947)

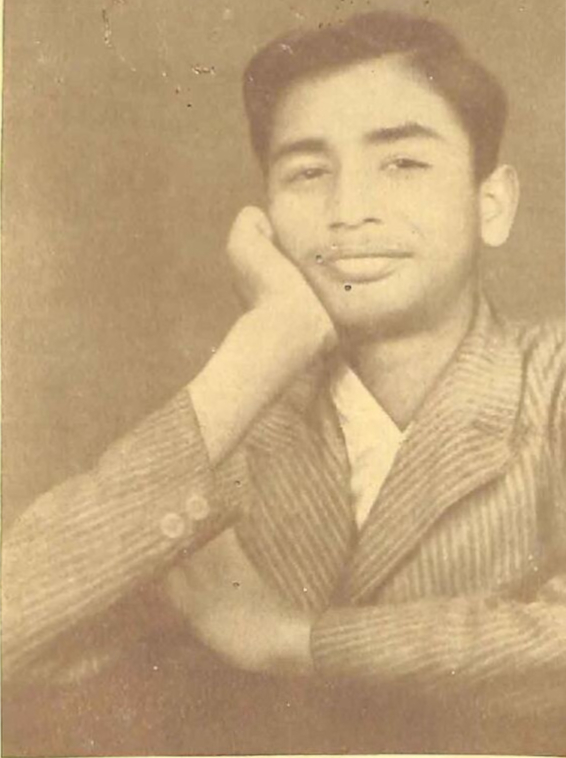
- Bhattacharya in the 1940s
- Born: 15 August 1926; Kalighat, Calcutta, Bengal Presidency, British India (now West Bengal, India)
- Died: 13 May 1947 (aged 20); Jadavpur, Calcutta, Bengal Presidency, British India (now West Bengal, India)
- Resting place: Kashi Mitra crematorium
- Education: Deshbandhu Beliaghata High School
- Occupations: Poet; playwright; short story writer; journalist; editor; lyricist; revolutionary; writer
- Parent(s): Nibaran Chandra Bhattacharya (father); Suniti Devi (mother)
- Relatives: Buddhadeb Bhattacharjee (nephew)
- Writing career
- Pen name: Kishore Kabi; Kabi Sukanta
- Language: Bengali
- Years active: 1934–1947
- Genres: Poetry, non-fiction, drama
- Subject: Literature
- Notable works: Chharpatra; Purbabhash; Ghum Nei; Hortal; Abhizan
- Movement: Bengali Renaissance

Sukanta Bhattacharya (Note: Also known as Sukant Bhattacharya.) (Bengali: [ʃukant̪o bʱɔʈːat͡ʃaɾd͡ʒo]; 15 August 1926 – 13 May 1947) was a Bengali poet and revolutionary. (Note: Sources:) He was known as "Young Nazrul" and "Kishore Bidrohi Kobi" (lit. 'Teenage Rebel Poet'), (Note: A reference to Kazi Nazrul Islam.) for his rebellious stance and opposition against the British Raj, Empire of Japan, other Axis powers, Second World War, and the social elites through the work of poetry. While his poetry was not much studied during his career, he became one of the most popular poets of the 20th century and Bengali literature after his death, primarily because all of his poetry collection books were published after his death. (Note: Sources:) These published books founded way for inspiration of social change in the community with their liberation themes. He became an official member of the Communist Party of India, as a Marxist poet, in 1944. He was known as a "Teen poet" for his works as a teen. His writing career spanned about 6 years. His main work was poetry, but he also wrote songs, stories, essays and plays.

Bhattacharya was born to a joint family in Kalighat, Calcutta. Deriving poetic interest from his sister Ranidi, writer Rabindranath Tagore and epic poems, he showed his first written poem in 1935 while on a tour in Jasidih, Santhal Parganas. With the deaths of his sister Ranidi and his mother Suniti Devi, he became highly despaired and reflected his feelings by writing in his notebook. Bhattacharya was enrolled in the Kamala Vidya Mandir, where his first literary works, including short stories, biographies and plays were written. Also in the school, his short biography of Vivekananda was published for his first time in the magazine Sikha. Throughout his life, starting from his admission to school, Bhattacharya showed a lack of interest in school, and instead focused more on writing, listening to the radio and playing, his early writings were contained in his own notebook.

His collaboration with Arunachal Basu in class seven marked a major impact on his poetry career. In the same Deshbandhu Beliaghata high school, he worked with several of his teachers and friends who helped him organize his poetry and bring out his works. Through Arunachal Basu, Bhattacharya came to know of his mother Sarala Devi having a girls' school in Beliaghata. Sarala Devi was a significant person in his life, helping him work on composing new poems and loving him. At this time, before he actively engaged with politics, he made appearances on radio by reciting live poems and making songs.

From 1939, World War II started; making a lasting mark and on his poetry. Events of the World War II, such as Hitler's invasion of Poland and casualties of the War set him back in his writing career. Starting from 1941, his works of his career are considered to be the most significant, describing events and liberative themes. During the War, he associated with literary and political movements. Becoming a Marxist poet and joining the Communist Party of India, he was a founder of the Kishore Bahini, partaking in writing and reporting for the Party and political newspapers. He also took matriculation exams from his school. Irregular eating worsened his health. He stayed in Narkeldanga and then at his aunt's house in Shyambazar. His visit to Benaras in late 1944 contracted him with malaria. He was bedridden several times and sent to different hospitals. With his last poems dating to his final years in the Jadavpur T. B. Hospital, he died in 1947; his body being taken by a truck and cremated. Bhattacharya's first poetry book Chharpatra was taken to printers after he died, and he only saw the file copy of one of those books.

== Career and works ==
=== Early life and influences ===
Sukanta Bhattacharya was born on 15 August 1926 in 42, Mahim Haldar Street in Kalighat, Calcutta. He was the second son of Suniti Devi and Nibaran Chandra Bhattacharya. The house was owned by Satish Chandra Bhattacharya, who was the grandfather of Sukanta Bhattacharya. Bhattacharya was named by his sister Ranidi, from a character in the story "Sukanta" by Manilal Gangopadhyay. Sukanta's ancestral home was in Kotalipara in Faridpur, where his father Nibaran Chandra initially lived. He left the house at the age of thirteen following his father Jagachandra's death. He came to Calcutta and worked for Agroj, and they established the book publishing house Saraswat Library. Because of his business, Nibaran Chandra became a book dealer, as a result Sukanta and his family stayed in Calcutta, for the business. His father Nibaran Chandra rented a house in Baghbazar and provided accommodation to persons who came into Calcutta for jobs. Bhattacharya spent his early life in the Kalighat house; he was accompanied by either his grandmother or his sister Ranidi.

According to Jagannath Chakravorty, Sukanta Bhattacharya took his first interest in poetry from Ranidi, who could recite poems written by Rabindranath Tagore. And from his mother, who would read aloud pages from the epics Ramayana and Mahabharata in Bengali. His father's brother Supandi was the leader of a Sanskrit literary circle and hosted meetings with Sanskrit scholars at the house. It was organized by Rakhal Bhattacharya, his uncle. He started writing from about the age of eight or nine.

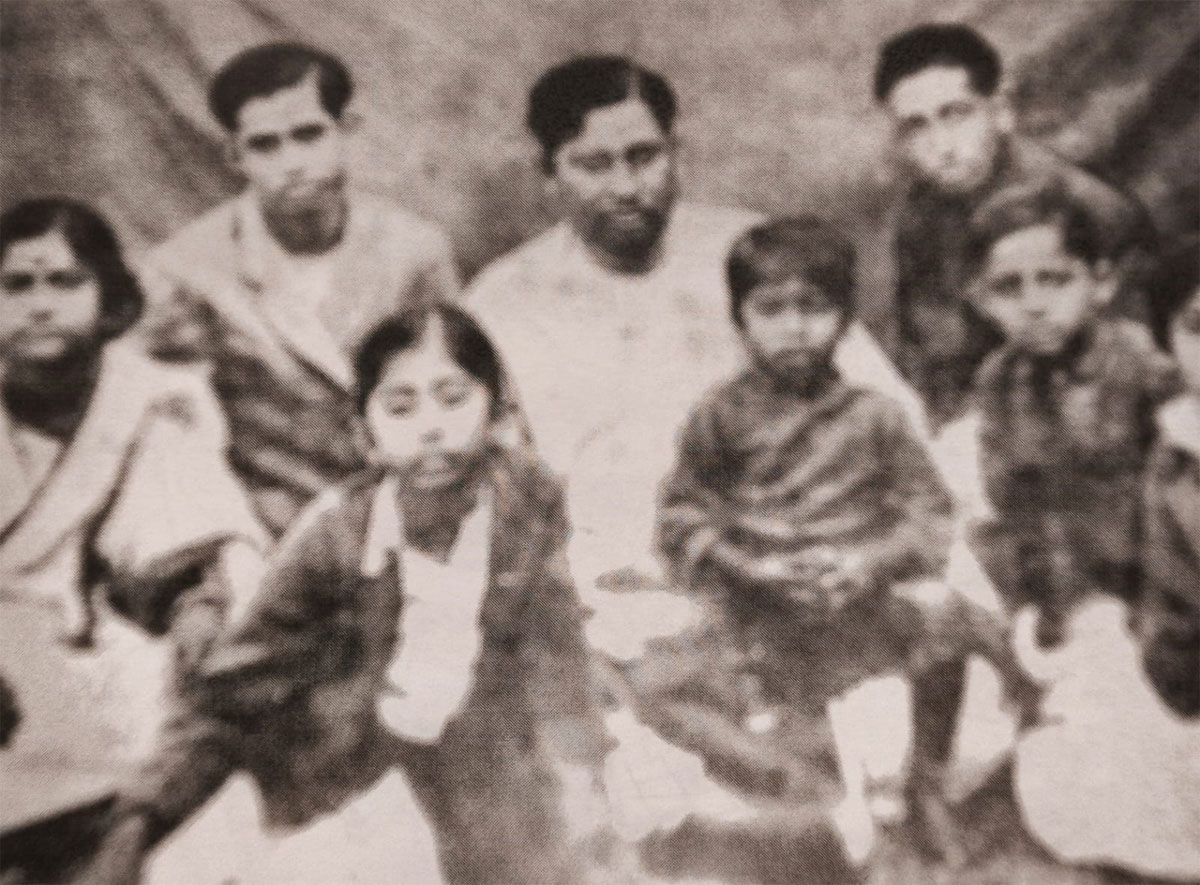
Sukanta Bhattacharya (middle, slightly right) sitting on Nibaran Chandra's lap

He had five brothers: Sushil, Prashanta, Bibhas, Ashok and Amiya. His half-brother Manomohan Bhattacharya married when he was six-years-old. Manomohan's wife Sorju Devi introduced him to letters and the alphabet. She brought "Khukumonir Chora" by Jogindranath Sarkar and recited rhymes to him. He heard Rabindranath Thakur's poems from his uncle Saroj Bhattacharya, his grandfather Gopalchandra Bhattacharya, and from Rakhal Chandra Bhattacharya. Nibaran Chandra felt sad that his financial income was less than his brother Krishna Chandra Bhattacharya. In the environment Sukanta grew up, he was subject to education and poverty. He was introduced to literature and learning from childhood, but also felt the effects of poverty. He became sensitive and introverted. He became happy when someone showed him sympathy.

One day, his mother found a cloth bag tied around her sari. When she opened it, she saw the writings of Sukanta saying he only loves Sushil and not him. According to Nandalal Bhattacharya, his uncle Krishna Chandra loved him even more than his parents and called him as "Sona." His sister Ranidi did many things for him from his childhood. His brother Manomohan and his uncles Gopal, Rakhal and Manoj also showed affection to him. He had not then learned to read. He would tell Sorju Devi to shout the words loudly and he would listen. He memorized them and later would recite them to others. Engaged in her work, she told him to learn to read. Bhattacharya got upset with her words and stopped coming near her; he wandered and had messy hair. She would pull him and bath him, feed him and comb his hair.

=== First works: Beginning of literary career and inspirations ===
Sukanta's family shifted from the rented house in Baghbazar to their own house in 34 Haramohan Ghosh Lane, Beliaghata. In this house, Bhattacharya wrote a verse on his younger brother Prasanta which he showed to his family. Prasanta did not like the two-line poem and complained to the elders. Shortly after he wrote, his sister Ranidi died. Bhattacharya's family moved to a rented house in College Street, but they later returned to a rented house in Haramohan Ghosh Lane six months later. Bhattacharya became a reciter of children's poems and also wrote poems, particularly from inspiration by the ones written by Jogindranath Sarkar and Sunirmal Basu. His step brother Manomohan Bhattacharya owned a book shop on College Street, from where children's books were accumulated in his house and read by Sukanta. He also wrote songs. Afterwards, he was enrolled in the school Kamala Vidya Mandir, by his neighborhood teacher Ahinbabu, where he became a bright student. His classmate Shailen Sarkar described the life of Bhattacharya in one of his articles. In the school, he got a role to play in the drama Dhruba. Outside school, he read books such as Bankim Chandra Chattopadhyay's. While in school, Bhattacharya wrote a short story in a magazine manuscript with other boys named Sanchay. He wrote essays on the lives of Rabindranath and Vivekananda, and the latter was published in the magazine Sikha, under the name of "Vivekanander Jiboni," edited by Bijon Bhattacharya. In this magazine, he published several of his poems and stories as a child. After the works of Bankim Chandra Chattopadhyay's, he started reading those of Rabindranath Tagore's.

In 1935, everyone from his house went to Jasidih, Santhal Parganas on a tour. Here his uncle Manoj Bhattacharya discovered his first poem written in his notebook, which brought him to the eyes of his elders. The poem centered Manoj's cousin Rama and his sister Ranidi. He also wrote a description of his experiences during his tour in Santhal Parganas.

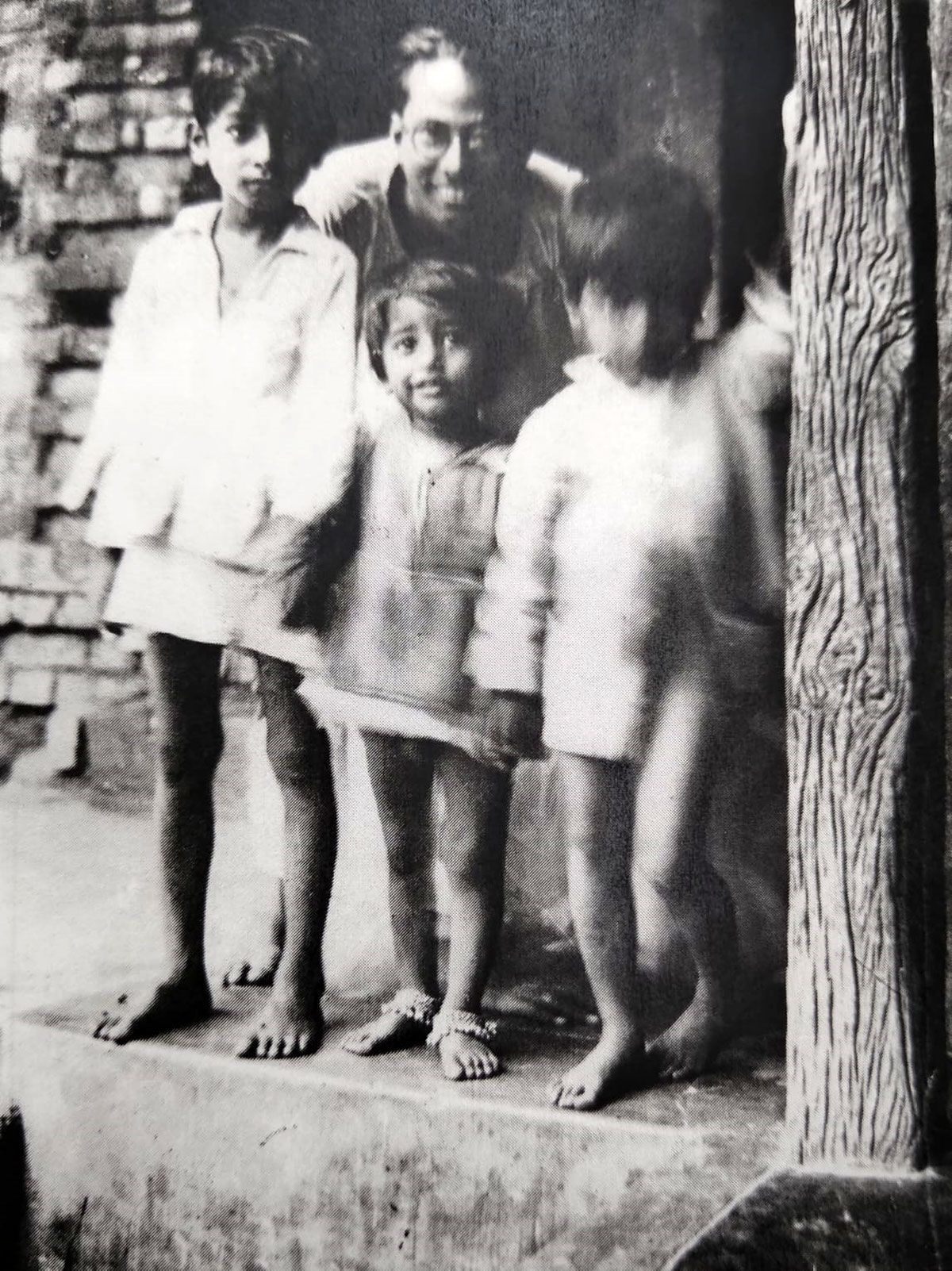
Bhattacharya as a child (left)

Bhattacharya's mother fell ill sometime later, and he and her shifted to his maternal grandfather's house in Kalighat. In this house, he played with other children his age. His younger uncle was the youngest son in the house and about the same age as him. One of them was with his cousin Bhupen in the play Bijay Sinha's Conquest of Lanka, which was directed and written by Sukanta Bhattacharya. Bhattacharya's mother moved into a house in Biswas Nursery Lane. His mother fell ill again and as per her wish was taken to Madhupur where she died of cancer, in 1937, when he was eleven years old. Before his mother, his uncle Gopal Chandra Bhattacharya died. Krishna Chandra sold his house at 32 Haramohan Ghosh Lane and moved away from Nibaran Chandra; Sukanta' mother was still alive then. Bhattacharya moved back to Beliaghata with his maternal aunt for his scholarship exams and did not see his mother's death. Bhattacharya spent his time on various outside activities and did not care about his food or drinks. He had a lack of focus on schoolwork and reading other books. Sorju Devi helped him in his studies and organizing and packing his books for school. After his mother's death, he wrote sad verses based on his feelings on a notebook. In the notebook, his narrative drama titled Rakhal Chhele was written based on his feelings after his mother's death, which he wrote at the age of eleven.

Sorju Devi saw his school books were torn and asked him why his books were in such a condition. Bhattacharya learned to recognize the letters, alphabet and numbers. He developed the sense of writing poems that could rhyme. He wrote poems that rhymed by matching similar letters and words. Kaliratan Babu, a Brahman, asked him to be like his brother Prashanta after he annoyed him. Sukanta drew a two-line poem that angered Prashanta and Kaliratan. At this time, a relative came to Bhattacharya's house who spoke in a rhythmic tone. He said to his nephew a line, which Bhattacharya extended by saying "Dhai kiri kiri, Dhai kiri kiri, Cholo Vrindavan," which was frequently used by his elders of the family. The epics of Ramayana and Mahabharata his mother told him were ingrained in his memory. He would imagine himself as characters in the poems. After he started writing poetry, he remembered the words and rhymes of the two epics. The epics left an influence in his poems. He became self-conscious. Upendranath Das, a publisher from Beliaghata, invited everyone to his house. Bhattacharya stayed in his house. He walked around the house when the other boys said to him the menu items. He said that he would burn Upen Das to ashes, which his family members were aware of. He later went to eat at the invitation of Upen Das with Sorju Devi when he came to invite the girls of the house.

According to Nandalal Bhattacharya, he did not read school books and instead read story books and those outside his school syllabus. He listened to the radio and played around. His aunt Sorju Devi was angered when she heard Bhattacharya like this. Bhattacharya said to her that he doesn't like the rigid rules of school and the dominance of the teachers. He also commented on not understanding history. He read Kalisingh's Mahabharata and was interested in it. But his enjoyment in reading the book did not effect his school studies. In the evening, Devi sat in the kitchen and prepared food. Bhattacharya suggested her to cook telebhaja (food fried in oil) for him and he would set up a shop to sell them, he also suggested selling for doi Devi made him. His brother Manomohan bought a radio, and Bhattacharya was very happy by getting it and listened to it for a long time.

One day, his younger brother found an unknown plant in the garden of their family house. His lips swelled after eating it. Sukanta named it Kochalbada, a combination of kochu (taro), potato and ginger. After a few days, they went back to their house in Haramohan Ghosh Lane. Other lyrics/narratives of the notebook include Surya Pranam on account of Rabindranath Tagore's death and Madu Malati, a story of two lovers. The pages of Madu Malati from his book had been lost, as Bhattacharya cut the pages and gave it to someone, who did not return it. Some pages of the notebook detailed his early life in Madhupur. As said by Ashok Bhattacharya, his mind was naturally introverted. At the age of ten or eleven, he wrote in his notebook state of his feelings, whereas other children of his age would be playing physical sport and football. An example of his feelings is in Rakhal Chele.

=== Pre-World War II: Working with Arunachal Basu and others ===
Some time later, Bhattacharya got admitted into the Beliaghata Deshbandhu High School. When Sukanta Bhattacharya was in class seven in Beliaghata High School, a student named Arunachal Basu enrolled in his class and became friends with him. The boys in his class with the help of their teacher Nabadwip Debnath worked on a magazine named Saptamika. Bhattacharya edited it and organized it. In the school, he was encouraged by several people on his writings, which Debnath was also a part of, and he would visit Debnath's house frequently. His friends Shyamdas Banerjee and Sailen Sarkar worked on its layout and decoration, for which they would often visit Bhattacharya's house. In this magazine, he wrote "Suchikitsa," part of Sukanta Samagra. Bhattacharya heard less than usual in his ears. He and Basu usually sat in the back benches discussing about literature. One day, Basu shouted to him in excitement, which the teacher came for. A student told him about his ear problem. The teacher called him in the teacher's room and confessed for his mistake. This teacher kept in touch with him even after quitting teaching, related to his literature and poems.

Bhattacharya read the books by Sarat Chandra (Chattopadhyay), Meghnad Badh Kavya by Madhusudan (Dutta), Alaler Gharer Dulal by Tekchand Tagore and Kathasaritsagar. Reading outside books, he got better at writing poems. The teachers in his school would be surprised to see his writings. Bhattacharya wrote while sitting in class, and his teachers kept a look on him. He engaged in discussions with Nabadwip Debnath, who helped him in organization in writing poems. He showed Debnath the story in Sikha which he had written about Vivekananda and some poetry. Upon finishing reading, he encouraged Bhattacharya to write more poetry, using different kinds of poems of Satyendranath Dutta as an example. Arunachal and Sukanta were involved in literature while in school.

Arunachal Basu's walled house was located in an empty field in Beliaghata. The house also served as a girls' school, where his mother taught. In this house, Bhattacharya spent many of his evenings in this house. He talked to and listened to the talks of Basu's mother Sarala Devi, often bringing discussion about poems and literature. He loved Basu's mother like his own mother. He told his poems, thoughts and ideas to Basu's mother, a teacher and writer. She would play a literary game where each person would write a separate line in a verse, such as "Shatabdi." In 1941, Basu's father changed his residence abandoning the house. Basu was then in Jessore. Sukanta wrote a letter to him informing him of the abandonment of the old house and residence change in early 1941. Bhattacharya was devastated by the waste of proper foods, in the days it was plentiful, and wrote the poem "Biye Barir Moja". He described adulteration of foods in his poem "Bhayjal". One day, he and his friend named Robin Ghosh planned an adventure and took a train from Howrah. He wanted the journey to last long, but the lack of money and morale of Ghosh made him return. After three days, he returned home and found his elder brother Sushil ill, suffering from a septic-related disease.

He decided not to enter his home. He left a note in Arunachal's home telling him to find him in Beliaghata, specifically the Golaydori field, which he termed as the "Suicide Green." Basu went to the said location and found Bhattacharya sitting on top of a tree branch. He then visited Shantiniketan for a short time. In 1941, before he engaged with politics, he wrote "Ekok Prithibi Bheshe Gelo Jonotar Probol Joware" and "1941 Saal." In 1940, he had written the poem "Bhabishyate" which indicated his passionateness for politics, especially for the freedom. He was emotionally related to politics, but did not yet consider communism. From 1941, he became active in engaging in political movements. While still in school, he became inclined towards socialism, which damaged his formal education. He read various books on the Russian Revolution and other books about the struggles of socialists. He continued writing poems, articles for magazines and reading.

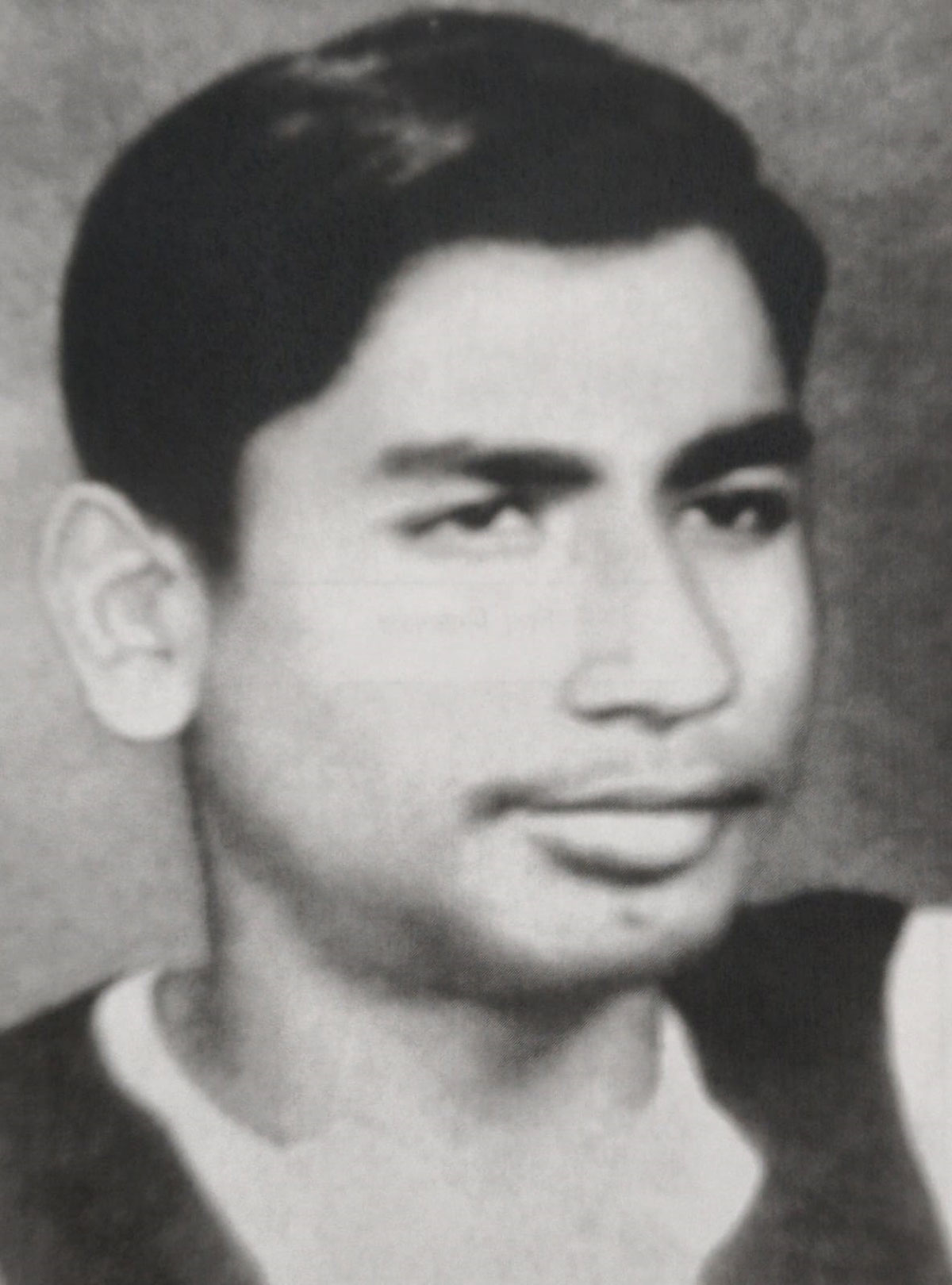
Bhattacharya as a teenager.

He was not keen to stay or visit his own house. His father stayed busy in his work all day. His brother Sushil was involved with his college studies. An old woman was the cook in their house. The house was involved in an old-fashioned atmospheric and ideas. He sought most of his time in his elder brother Manomohan's house. When Tagore died in 1941, he recited a live poem on Tagore from the Calcutta [radio] station. He wrote many songs based on Tagore. Sukanta's best interest in outdoor games was in badminton. His other hobbies included playing chess, reading books and coaching. Before he opted for the sacred thread ceremony, he photographed himself. The photograph is the most common association of him. Bhattacharya commonly appeared in radio programs. According to contemporaries of his time, an elder member of his family gave him one rupee as a gift on his birthday. He used this money to pay for his photo in a photo studio. According to Ashok Bhattacharya, his boudi gave him some money for food. His friend Bhupen advised him to take photos. He took four passport-sized photos, of which one was with his palm on his cheek.

At this time, he recited a poem on the radio show Golpodadur Asore, hosted on Calcutta Radio, which was named "Shiter Awhwan" (শীতের আহ্বান) written by Rabindranath. Pankaj Kumar Mullick, a singer, sang three songs live on radio, after the arrangement for singers to appear on that radio was done; the first song was written by Sukanta and composed by Kumar Mullick. He also listened to songs on radio besides reciting the ones made by Rabindranath. In his neighborhood, he only had made one or two friends, among them was Robin Ghosh. He, Ghosh and others worked on activities such as cleaning a dirty field and forming a badminton club there. Bhattacharya along with his friends opened a free coaching center for young boys on the veranda of their house. It remained active for two or three weeks. Sukanta was one of the founders of the Students' Library in Beliaghata; giving books by going through his house cupboards and asking from friends and relatives. He composed a letter to his friend Basu about his "girlfriend" who lived close by. She was 9 years old when Bhattacharya was 11.

=== World War II: Liberative works and involvement in politics ===
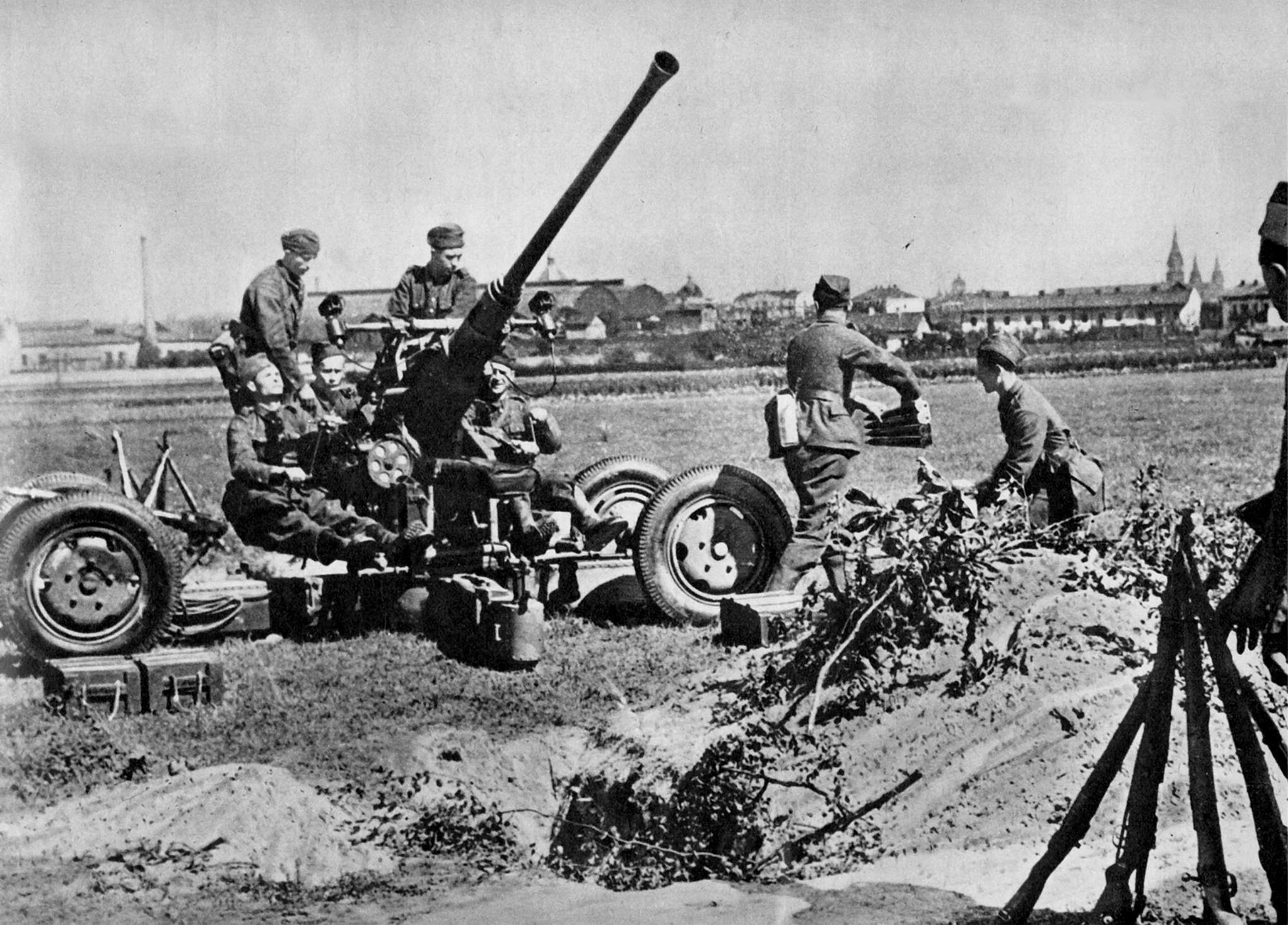
Invasion of Poland was one of the events that transitioned Bhattacharya into liberative poems.

Sukanta Bhattacharya's early writings focused on nature and personal feelings, but the aspect of the period before World War II started (pre-war period) made impacts to his writing styles and mind, which were first visible in his notebook. The topic of the War and protests for the independence of India impacted Kalighat, where Bhattacharya lived at the moment. The Second World War influenced Sukanta's poetry majorly. Of the actions of the war, he got used to Air Raid Precaution squad, "black out" and the "siren." The activities and casualties caused by Adolf Hitler's army in Europe and Asia, made him depressed. Soon, he got out of depression and worked into the liberation of India. By the start of the war, he was aged fourteen or fifteen. Among the wars and activities that influenced his poetry were the deaths and casualties of the Second World War, the oppressions conducted by Japanese army on China, and invasions of countries by Hitler's army in Europe. At this time, the war had not reached India.

From his early life and writings on his feelings and sorrow, he became inspired by Rabindranath Tagore, who he already knew from childhood. In his life, he composed four poems and a ballad dedicated to Tagore. He kept an eye at the works of him. Tagore's declarations on anti-war appealed to him and gave him hope. His poem "Jagbar Din Aaj" or "Today is the day to wake up" was the first to demonstrate this. He came into contact with politics in about 1941. He studied books at home but did not like going to school. According to Sarashu Devi, he had developed a sense of disgust from school. He particularly did not like the school rules and regulations and discipline of the teachers. She also said he was inexperienced in history and mathematics, often failing in the two. His first poem centering the freedom movement; describing laborers and farmers is believed to be "Bhabishyate," in about 1940.

In November 1941, he wrote in a letter to Arunachal describing his love for Calcutta, remarking that Calcutta was approaching the year 1942. From 1941, the people of Calcutta shifted away in millions because of the Japanese bombers that flew above the city. At day, there were not many people, and there were no lights at night. Military vehicles and soldiers occasionally came to the city. This was the subject of Sukanta's letter to Basu. On the day he wrote the letter, his brothers had gone to Murshidabad. He was supposed to go, but chose to stay at home "in an adventurous and thrilling desire to face death." At the same time, Sarala Devi wrote to him from Jessore to go there. The Marxist movement, which was not then popular in Calcutta, got his attention. Many students would come into his house hosting discussions with his brother Sushil. From these discussions, he came to know of the Soviet Union, from when afterwards he took the ideology of Marxism. He read the collection titled "Modern Bengali Poetry" written by Hirendranath Mukhopadhyay and Abu Sayeed Ayub. He also read various poetry books authored by Subhas Mukhopadhyay, Sudhindranath Dutta, Bishnu Dey and Samar Sen, which highlighted grievances of common people.

Acceptance of Marxism was Bhattacharya's first transition into modern poetry. After reading a poetry anthology, he got the concept of liberation themed-poems. In 1942, he organized students' strikes in schools. Later, he became a member of the Communist Party in Beliaghata. There were few members in the communist party of Beliaghata, and every member had to work hard to meet the working demands. Sukanta was tasked with selling Janajuddha, a party paper. He and his friends spent their hours in writing political posters, often being late in returning home. In December 1942, he sent another letter to Arunachal Basu portraying his steps towards politics and new environment. Because of Sukanta's neglect to his studies, the elders in his house would get angry. He developed a habit of hiding from the elders of his house. In return of his hard work for the communists, he acquired official membership of the Communist Party of India, becoming its youngest member at the time. He still continued writing in literature. He then wrote a sarcastic poem based on autocratic Japan.

Sukanta's home environment was not conductive to his poetic works. His clothes, shirt and bed sheets were dirty while he was in his house. In the house, arrangement was made for food serving two times a day. His eating was uncared for. He would go to the homes of other people. Sukanta's father heard from local elders of his son's involvement with communists. The paid cook of their house showed a lack of care for the food. At the time Bhattacharya ate cold food at irregular times of the day, which caused harm to his health. Sukanta's cousin Manoj Bhattacharya was a friend of Subhas Mukhopadhyay who Sukanta regarded as his mentor. As he wrote in a letter, after a long time from a university meeting, he went to Mukhopadhyay with poems that would be featured in a collection. He stayed with him for two hours and had a conversation. Mukhopadhyay asked him to publish a book. His poems in this time were published in magazines like Arani, Porichoy and Janajuddha. According to Chakravorty, Sukanta was a national poet much different from others and became the voice of the people. He emerged as an anti-Fascist poet. At the time, he had written the poem "To Rabindranath" (1943). In 1943, he went to "Rabindra Smoron," organized by the Indian Life Saving Society, where he narrated the poem "To Rabindranath," in it the poet Buddhadeb Bose was present. Parul Bose remarked that Bhattacharya was wearing a half-dirty shirt and had no shoes, looking different from others in the meeting.

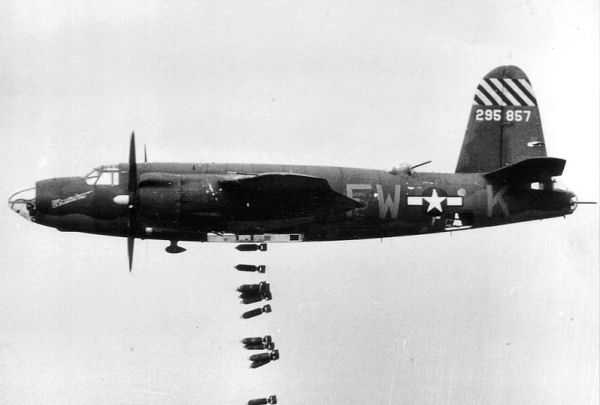
Bhattacharya saw the bombings of major cities like Calcutta and Chittagong

The brothers of Bhattacharya's father's brother had been associated with the society for some time. The lake of the society was captured by the military; and he wrote a poem as condolence to one of them, parodying Subhas's poem "Swagata." Bhattacharya became upset with the air raids on Chittagong by the Japanese army. The sufferings demonstrated on the people of Masterda Surya Sen's city prompted him to write a poem on Chittagong. Japanese air raids also occurred in Calcutta, and he wrote a letter describing them on 28 December 1942.

In this letter, he mentioned going to a lecture of P. C. Joshi. On April 18, 1930, groups of revolutionaries led by Surya Sen Practicing poetry styles explaining the sadness and rebellion, raided an armory in Chittagong, demonstrating the desire for independence. In 1943, when the Japanese Army began their military subjugation over Chittagong, Bhattacharya wrote a poem seeing their brutal treatments. On the same day, Surya Sen was hanged to his death, causing turmoil within the youth communities. Asit Kumar Bandyopadhyay said that the poetic symbols that were used by Bhattacharya were derived from both ways of life, and he never had to resort to another place or seek other forms or literature for it. As a teenager, Sukanta's was curious about the sights of the world, yet the course of World War II turned his vision into seeing struggles, conflicts, and killing. He was faced with intense feelings, judgmental tendencies and languishment.

In the meeting, Subhas Mukhopadhyay met him and praised him for his poem "To Which Friend." He expressed sadly that the poem had been lost from pocket and he would had sent it for printing. Saroj Mohan Mitra stated that this was not the first time that Mukhopadhyay and Bhattacharya met, and they had been introduced before. The poem was already in his pocket for several days. His poems were being published in "Parichoy" and his stories in "Arani." On 10 April 1943, his letter to Basu stated a "Kalboishaki storm to have come in his personal life." His parents had stopped caring about his education then. On the same day, he wrote another letter to Basu saying that he was late by twenty or twenty two days and that financial hardship alongside family turmoil had severely attacked him, for which he stated the Kalboishaki storm to have come. When Calcutta was bombed, he was in his brother's house and later went to his boudi Sarayu Devi's house. He went back three days later. In another poem, he depicted the progress of the Japanese army into India, fixed in the state of Manipur. He wrote many anti-Fascist poems and propaganda dramas.

Bhattacharya worked with the jute mill workers in Narkeldanga, and made anti-Fascist posters for them. With the ink from the jute mills he also wrote poems on the back of the posters, such as "Shatru Ak" and "Udvikkhon," part of his literary collection book Chharpatra; he specifies the opressed and neglected people in the two poems. He went around cities and villages, writing several propaganda dramas. He wrote for the Gananatya Shangha. On the death of Somen Chanda, he wrote "Knife" or "Chhuri" in Bengali. With Chand's death, many writers condemned his killers and the "Anti-Fascist Writers and Artist's Association" was formed, first publishing Janajuddha. He was at the time deeply upset with the misery of the people during the Bengal famine of 1943. He volunteered and helped the people in getting their weekly rations from ration shops in his locality. Vigilance during the rations was to prevent corruption in the system. In addition, he was engaged in relief works. He accustomed in service work for the "Jonorokkha Samiti." He looked after people to ensure they were standing in lines to collect items like rice, sugar and kerosene. He volunteered to maintain systems in running smooth, and along with others helped keep it corruption-free.

Bhattacharya saw the deaths of peasants and their deteriorating skeletons being carried through the rural areas. The peasants and farmers affected by the famine came to the city for food and primarily to stay alive. With the deaths of the farmers, laborers were not present in numbers for harvesting the crops whenever the harvest season came. Founded on these real-life events, he wrote the poem known as "The Call Of The Harvest" or "Phasaler Dak." He was sent to various places as a reporter for printing news for Janajuddha, such as Chittagong, which gave him more experience on the famine. The previous famine had influenced modern poets. A collection of poems on the famines were written by different poets of the contemporary literary organization "Anti-Fascist Writers and Artist's Association," and Bhattacharya was given the task to edit the collection. This was named Famine or Akal, published in about 1944. Sukanta was against the use of pessimism in his poems, which was shown through the poem "During This New Harvest" or "Nabanner Dak."

After convincing the party members, Bhattacharya was recognized as a formal member of the Party and the Beliaghata office. He was still a student at the Beliaghata High School. He engrossed in doing the work assigned by the party, submit the accounts of his works, appear in the party office and assume responsibilities. His work primarily consisted of being done inside the office, or writing posters and delivering them from one place to another, like factories. Bhattacharya was tasked to make sure the posters reached the eyes of the common people, and he sometimes carried labels to collect money. He involved himself in working carefully with the common people and working class, and aimed to establish socialism by removing Fascism and Nazism. Bhattacharya also engaged in collecting funds. He joined the local organization named Jonorokkha Samiti and got works from it.

He was a persistent helper of farmers, and had a close relationship between their lives and works. Bhattacharya was joyful in writing about the soils, grounds and crops. According to Chakravorty, Bhattacharya brought together the rural and urban sides of the famine in literature and poetry and founded himself as a national poet and the people's poet. The poem "The Peasant's Song" or "Krishaker Gan" was composed by him. His compositions written on the famine include "Bibroti", "Rabindranather Prati", "Bodhon", "Phasaler Dak", "Ei Nobanno". Many people say "Bodhon" written in about the 1940s to be his best poem including professor Jagadish Chandra Bhattacharya, as said by Ashok Bhattacharya, and Asit Kumar Bandyopadhyay. Afterwards, Sukanta Bhattacharya worked towards the formation of "Kishore Bahini", an organization of about thirty thousand young people in Bengal. This was created to protect the young people from environments that prevailed in Bengal such as of wars and famine.

To help fulfill the objective of Kishore Bahini, the daily newspaper Swadhinata opened the division "Kishore Sabha Bibhag."The responsibility of handling this special division was given to Sukanta Bhattacharya. Through the division, Bhattacharya wanted to explain to the teenagers to part away from the fictional palace of Roopkar and to realize that the world was the undergoing a world war. He gave descriptions that there were people suffering from a famine that cost people their careers. He also contributed in writing plays, rhymes, poems to the youth section of the newspaper. Other writers of the time wrote for to spread the objective of the newspaper. As a member of the Bahini, he had the job of selling papers, sometimes in Sealdah, Howrah railway station or standing on the road. He sent a letter to the youth corporation of the youth department in Bhabani Dutta Lane, in October 1944, stating what tasks the members would have to do and he thought about how to manage the department.

During this time, Arunachal Basu was living in a remote village located in Jessore, keeping communication with Sukanta. Basu occasionally helped him in the paper by drawing pictures and cartoons that went to print. Bhattacharya reviewed the pictures he gave to the Swadhinata Patrika, and did not send them to be printed if they were not of high quality, except a few pictures. He asked his younger brother Ashok Bhattacharya to draw something with Chinese ink, and he would print it out. Ashok Bhattacharya drew a picture of Rabindranath with it, which he was delighted to see; this was denied by Subhas Mukhopadhyay. According to Asit Kumar Bandyopadhyay, Bhattacharya wanted to inspire members of the Kishore Bahini with ideas that were appropriate for the time. Bandyopadhyay remarked that he wanted the transmission of the new era through new methods of thoughts and ideas, and wanted to make the world more enjoyable for the working class and laborers. He entered a close relationship with the working class, laborers and farmers by helping them in their works and composing poems and stories founded on them, expressing their life hardships and happiness. Contemporary writers such as Khagendranath Mitra, Jogendranath Gupta, and others who wrote for young people endorsed him in forming the Bahini and further wrote for expanding the newspaper section.

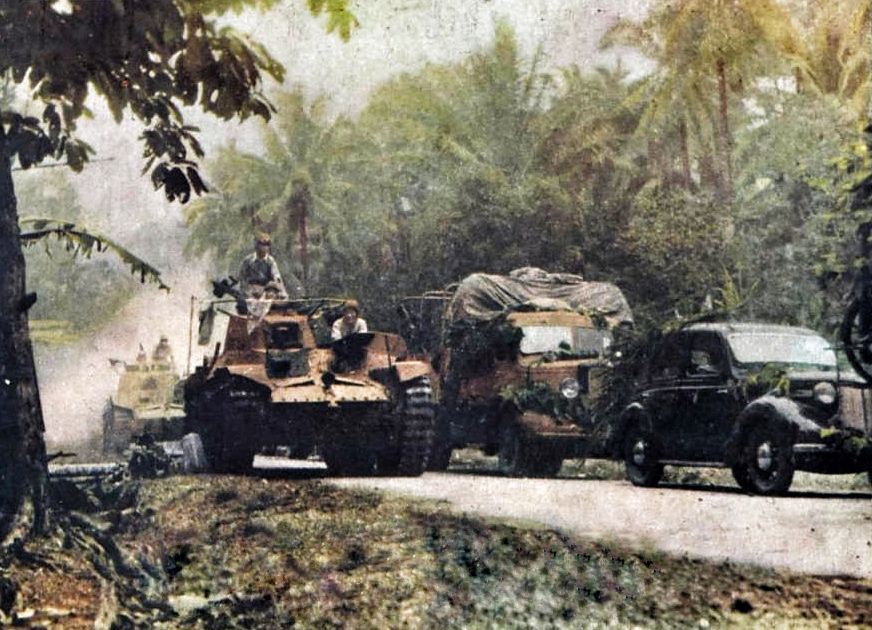
Bhattacharya warned people about the wars initiated by the Imperial Japanese Army in WW2.

He became the editor of "Kishore Sabha," a youth wing by daily paper Swadhinata. The Bahini was established on 15 April 1943, and Bhattacharya became the organization's chief one year later. His verses during this time were published in the book Sweet and Sour or Mithekoda. He wrote the drama Abhijan on demands from the young members of the Sabha for a writing based on the famine.

The drama focus on Sankalita, and is based on children's literature. Bhattacharya would often go to visit his homes in Beliaghata and Shyambazar. He and his family moved out of the house on Haramohan Street Lane and resided in the rented second floor of house number 20 in Narkeldanga Main Road, at the end of 1942. His room was located by the side of the road. For various work purposes, he would wander around the city the whole day. His triangular route consisted of his home in Narkeldanga, the office of "Kishore Bahini" in Bhanani Dutta Lane, College Street, the house of his jethima in Shyambazar, and Bhupen's house in Baghbazar. The Kishore Bahini office destination of Bhattacharya was changed a year later, when the office of the newspaper "Swadhinata" was opened in Deckers Lane in Esplanade. In September 1942, Chittagong and Feni were bombed by the Japanese army. Bhattacharya on this day engaged himself in working for the Communist Party. His task in reflection of activism was to make people aware of the bombings, Japanese wars and movements initiated by the people. He wrote poetry that described the common people, his political views changed and he wrote poetry for the public. The first edition of a song anthology book named Janajuddher Gaan was published in July 1942. Bhattacharya was inspired by the songs present in it. Two months later, his song "Janajuddher Gaan" was added to the second edition of the published book.

The war broke out on that day. The last mask of barbarity fell off, even the politeness of hypocrisy was nowhere to be found. There are kills on land, water and air today, not just the killings of soldiers, but also the killing of women, and children and the destruction of community properties. Besides the killing of love and truthful ideas. The wave of these deaths have arrived to the coast of India today. Today, I have to realize that my happiness and sorrow, and love and despair are all connected to the politics of the world. I was not a very good person at seven or even at five, I want to study sitting at the corner of my quiet room and occasionally want to write some poems, but who is letting me live at peace? At any moment my residence, significant other, love and affection along with me may be lost at any moment. Or some force may take away my pen, stop all my work and bury my self-expressions under a stone – then where do I exist? Therefore it appears that my ability to do activities while sitting at home, like basic human rights of air and water, is connected to the world of politics.

— Sukanta Bhattacharya, in an article titled "Civilization and Fascism."

In his room, he had hung two pictures, one was of a farmer painted by Debabrata Mukhopadhyay and another one of a laborer. He later hung a painting of the universe and a Japanese picture borrowed from Arunachal Basu. On the drawer of the desk he wrote were pictures of P. C. Joshi and Joseph Stalin. At the time, Bhattacharya started writing a twelve-part novel centering Arunachal, Bhupen and Bimal. Every Saturday, one of the four narrated their part for inclusion and the other three hosted the person. But the novel was not finished because of upcoming riots. Bhupen had made him write several poems. In a notebook, Sukanta wrote nineteen songs for Bhupen. Instead of using transport such as buses and trams, he walked through the entire distance in the city. He would take trips to places such as Santhal Parganas, Chittagong and Varanasi. He went to a trip in Ranchi and wrote his experience in a letter to Basu. According to A. Bhattacharya, natural beauty without human appeal was meaningless to him.

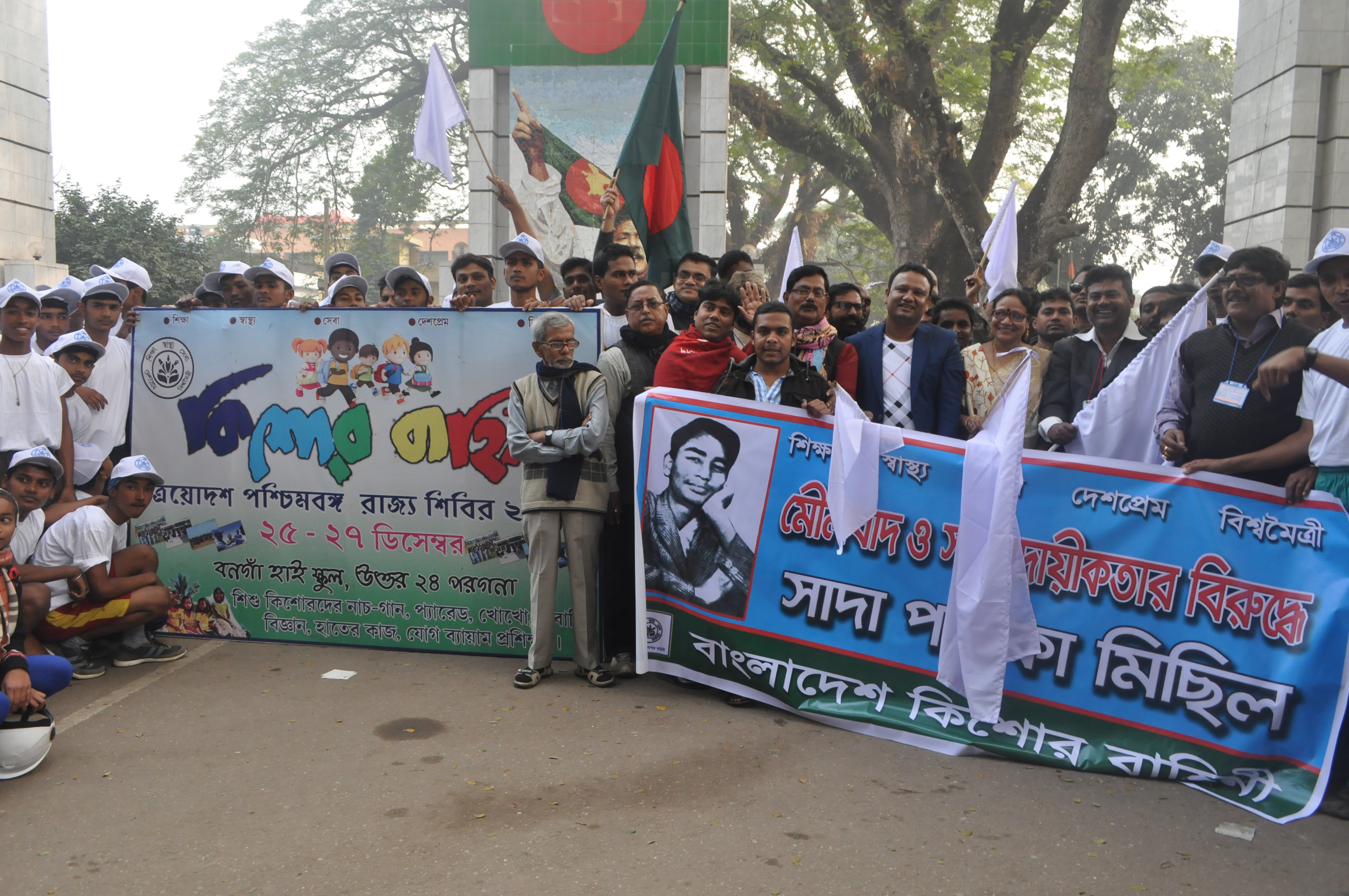
Kishore Bahini in 2017, with a poster of Sukanta Bhattacharya

In 1944, Bhattacharya was mainly focused on the activities of the "Kishore Bahini" and young people. The people in the organization were interested in dramas and plays. But at the time, there was no drama for them to act in. With discussion, it was concluded that he would write a drama based on the Famine of 1943. Annadashankar Bhattacharya, the student leader, sent him to watch "Bindur Chele" in a theater. He came back into the dormitory. The dance-drama Abhijan was finished in the Annadashankar's house. In December 1942, "Eksutre" was published by the Anti-Fascist Writers, in which his poem "Moddhobritta, 42," documenting the middle class of the time, was featured. According to Saroj Mohan Mitra, Abhijan was first performed in Indian Association Hall on 14 April 1943. On 28 April 1943, his article "Daradi Kishore" was published in Janajuddha as a Kishore Bahini Member. And on 6 October his short story "Kishorer Swapna" was printed. Janajuddha announced under the headline "Kishore Bahini Shon[o]" on 1 May 1944 that the music and dramatical book "Aporajeyo" written by Sukanta and Annadashankar would be published soon. Sukanta wrote the poems "Khudha" and "Durboddho" similar to Abhijan, and were published in Arani on 2 April and 8 April 1943 respectively.

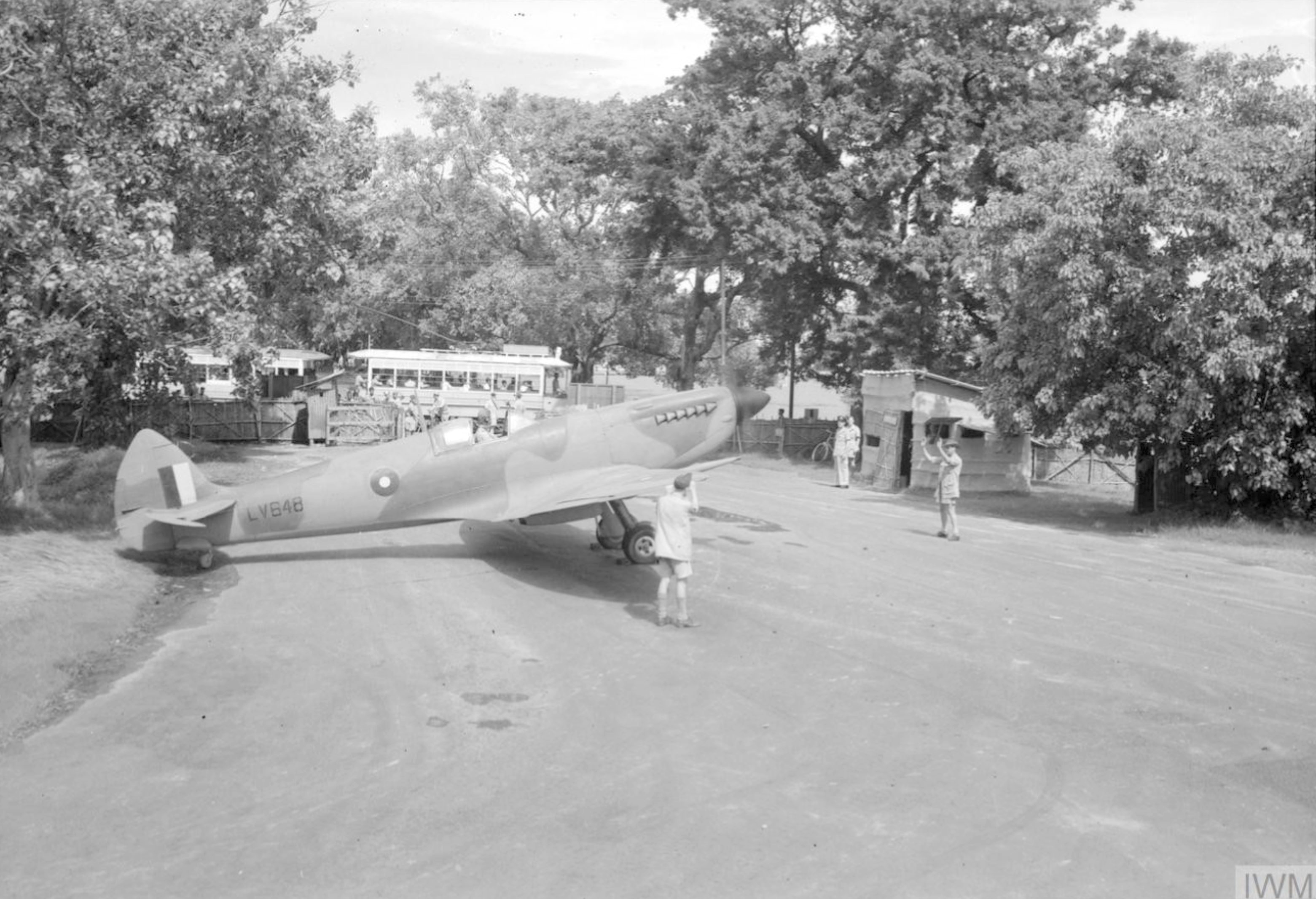
An WW2 fighter plane stalled in Kolkata.

In 1943, his poems included "Bibriti", "Chattagram: 1943", "Manipur", "Rome: 1943", "Udvikkhon" and others. At the end of the year, he fell ill. This is stated in his letter to Basu on 22 December. In the letter he asked why Basu doesn't inquire about him and asked him to bring a rented car to visit an exhibition in a school. His elder brother Sushil Bhattacharya got married in June 1944. Sukanta wrote a letter to Arunachal explaining why he couldn't visit for a few reasons. In the same letter, he described the conditions after marriage and his works in it. He went to Varanasi (Kashi) in October with the family of Rakhal (Chandra) Bhattacharya and on the fifth day he was struck by malaria. He wrote to Arunachal that he was very weak and had a hard time writing. He became tired from his illnesses and remarked that Beliaghata was a malaria-empire and showed apprehensiveness to return. Sukanta suffered from malaria frequently and at the end of 1944, during the same stay at the city of Varanasi (Kashi) he became ill. During this visit, he suffered from Malaria twice, according to Ashok Bhattacharya. He returned to Shyambazar in Calcutta, where his aunt took care of him.

His return was also for the preparation in 1945 for his university Matriculation exams. In his own words, he was worried and anxious, but still making effort. His dream was to become a professor in Bengali. But he could not pass for his low marks in math. He took his exams again next year with a tutor assigned by his elder brother Sushil in the Narkeldanga house, but he failed. This was a formal end to his educations as he subsequently became busy in attending students' strikes and leftist political activities. Two years from his first exam attempt, when he learned that he could study for Junior Cambridge and Senior Cambridge without math involved, he was excited to begin studying for it. He continued working for the Communists. His poems written in 1944 included "Ei Nabanno", "Chirodiner", "Nibhrito" and "The Age of Eighteen."

Bhattacharya contracted typhoid shorty after he gave his first entrance exams and repeated sufferings from malaria. His health suffered from a wasting disease which affected his vital areas. In November 1945, residents of Calcutta revolted against the British government. He was inspired from the activities and events of the city and wrote many poems based on it. He participated in mass movements such as the students' strike in Dharmatala in November 1945 where he participated in the front to free the Azad Hind Fauz, writing "Ekushe November: 1946"; and another one in 1946 to Vietnam. On 29 July, 1946, "Bangla bondho hartal" was started. In the revolt, people of all occupations joined it, including writers, artists and thinkers. Jahar Ganguly, Chhobi Biswas and Hemanta Mukhopadhyay participated in it. Akashvani–a radio station hosted the strikes of artists during the movement. Sukanta saw the strike of workers on 29 July 1944 and wrote his poem "The Age of Eighteen." Between 1940 and 1946, his poem "Feelings" or "Anubhav" showed a transition previously apparent in "To Rabindranath." According to Chakravorty, his mission as a poet and his special significance in life was shown in the poem "Passport" or "Chharpatra." From 25 December 1945, Janujuddha became Swadhinata. He became the manager of Kishore Bahini and a reporter for the newspaper. He wrote his poem while on the ship; later reciting the same written poem "Thikana" first in the conference.

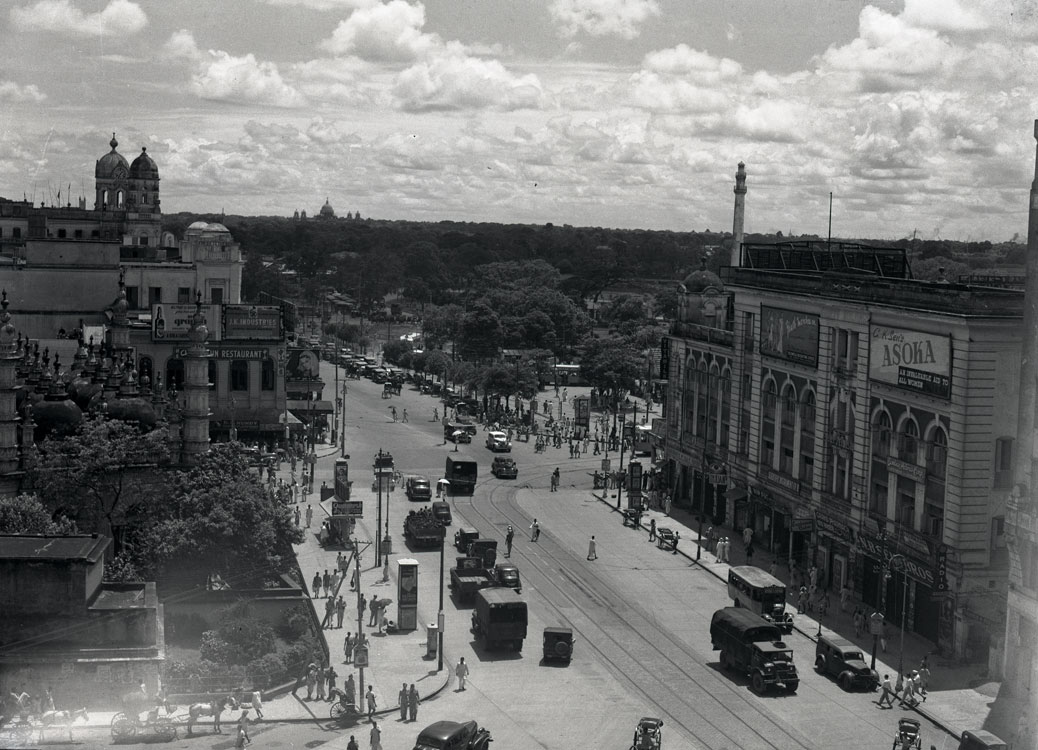
Roads of Calcutta in 1945

In July 1946, his poem "Jonotar Mukhe Phote Bidyutbani" was read in a meeting in the University of Calcutta. The Direct Action Day happened in August 1946. Regarding the riots, he wrote the poems "September '46", "Diwali", "Chorompotro" and "Ekushe November: 1946." Bhattacharya was excited over the elections in the year 1946, but was suggested to rest in bed for a period of time from his illnesses in mid-1946. He could not go out of Bengal because of the lack of time and money. At this time, he prepared for his exams and worked for his organizations. He would disregard any advice and actions from his relatives to stay at rest. He refused to stay in bed and would only go to bed once he had no energy. This led to the gradual collapse of his health. He was taken to Red Aid Cure Home located on 10 Rowdon Street by the student leader Annadashankar, where he slowly recovered. In September 1946, he wrote a poem describing the atmosphere of Calcutta during riots between Hindus and Muslims. This poem was titled "September 1946." He wrote a letter to Bhupen exchanging Diwali greetings. In another letter dated 12 September 1946, he penned a letter to Bhupen delineating his conditions and activities in the hospital. Sukanta went back home without diagnosis. He was identified to have intestinal tuberculosis but not of the lungs. At that time, no full cure or medicine was present.

Jagannath Chakravorty and Krishna Chakrabarti used to visit him frequently during this time and read out their literary works to him. Siddheswar Sen and his friend Mohit Aich sang to him. Sukanta Bhattacharya wrote a number of symbolist poems in Bengali which include "Sindi", "Charagach", "Chil", "Cigarettes", "Ekti Moroger Kahini" and "Prarthi." According to Chakravorty, he started writing poems based on the technique of noticing symbolic significance of common things. Sitting on his bed, he remembered the day of 21 November 1945 and wrote a poem, which was later read by Mohit Aich in a student meeting. Of his poems written at this period of time, "Sindi" or "Staircase" was based on the death of Humayun by falling from the stairs of his library. He wrote the poem "Charagach" or "Sapling" on seeing a banayan tree sapling growing on the cornice. The same style was used in his poem "Chil" or "Kite." The poem "Cigarettes" was based on cigarette he could easily see. "Ekti Moroger Kahini" or "Tale of a Cock" was based on his technique of symbolism, featuring a poem of quiet drama, surprise, and anti-climax, said Chakravorty. His poem "Prarthi" or "Suppliant" was the last poem written by him in winter season, in it he wished for light.

=== Later life and death: 1946–1947 ===
The 1946 Calcutta riot in Bengal happened, which also spread to Noakhali. Mahatma Gandhi tried to stop the riots that had spread between Calcutta and Noakhali. This received approval from Bhattacharya, who wrote the poem "To Mahatmaji" or "Mahatmajir Prati". Bhattacharya felt inspired by both Mahatma Gandhi and Vladimir Lenin, and had written the poem "Lenin" previously based on him. They both served as an example for the increment of his patriotism and commitment for the liberation of India. Based on his ideas and prolonged view on history, he wrote his poem "Historic" or "Oitihasik." On his return from Red Aid Cure Home, he was under treatment from doctors. Most of his days, he could not visit a doctor because of curfews in Beliaghata, often buying medicine at the delay of one or two days. He at the time suffered from high body temperature and stomach pains.

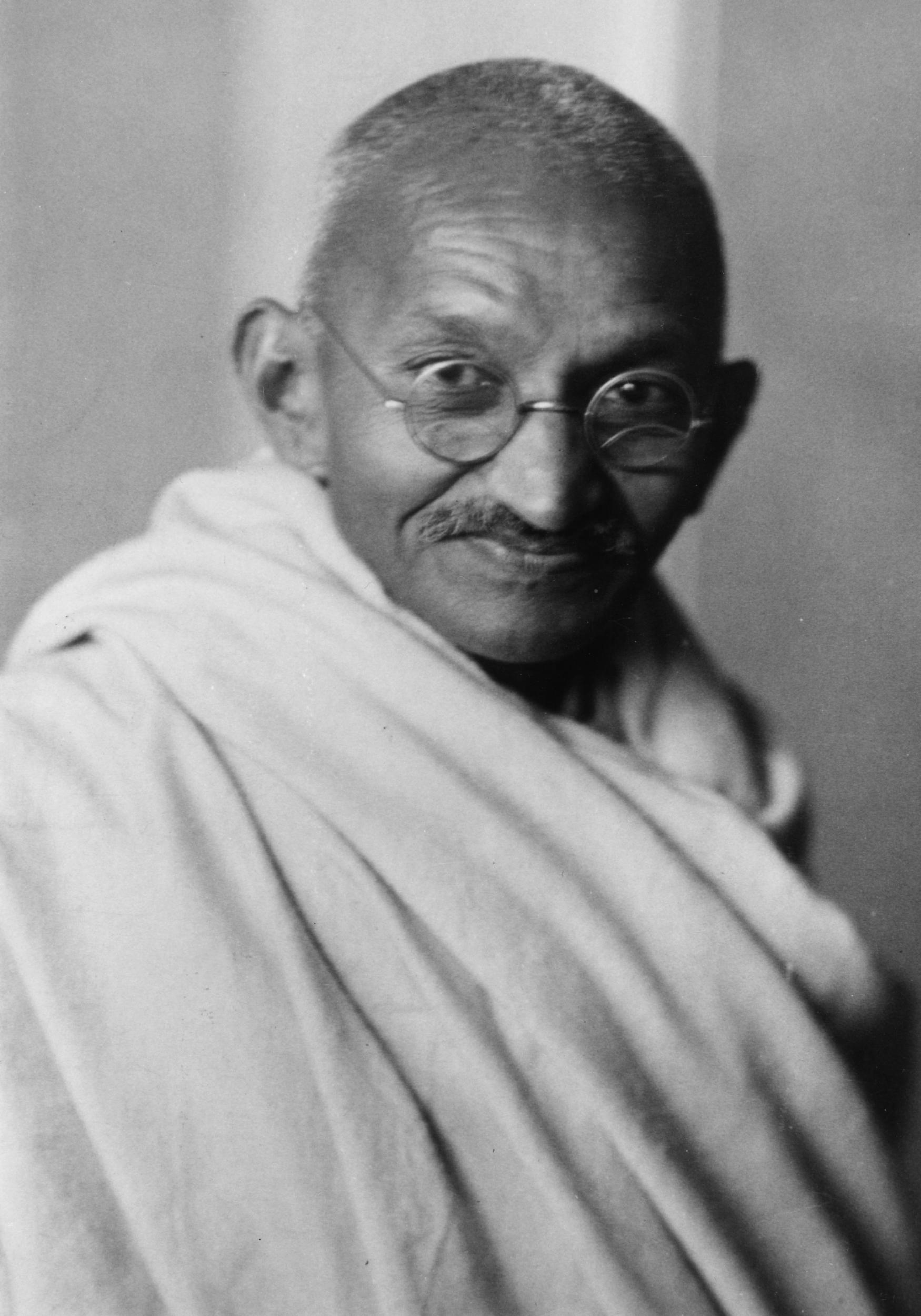
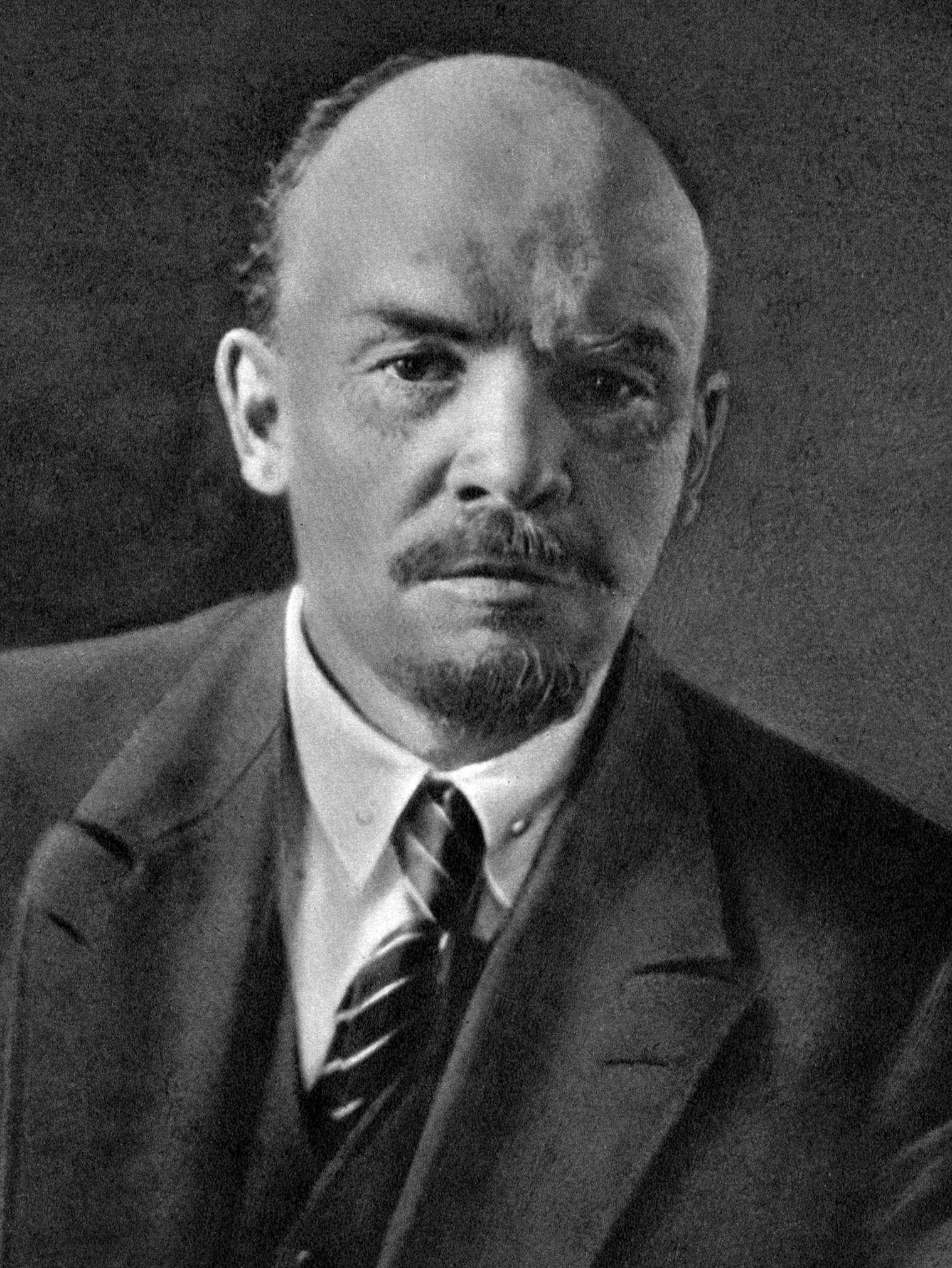
Bhattacharya felt inspired by Mahatma Gandhi and Vladimir Lenin, and wrote poems about them.

Seeing his fever, his father figured that he was suffering from weakness and wanted to take him somewhere else. He was shifted from Narkeldanga to 11-D, Ramdhan Mitra Lane, Shyambazar by Manoj Bhattacharya. Dr. Tapas Bose confirmed Sukanta to have intestinal tuberculosis. Writers such as Subhas Mukherjee, and singers Hemanta Mukhopadhyay and Suchitra Mitra raised funds for his treatment. The leader of the Communist Party Muzaffar Ahmed and others suggested and made plans of transferring him to a sanatorium in Ajmer. He wrote a letter to Bhupen on 12 September 1946. He described that he liked the sun light shining on a cedar tree the most and the scattered clouds outside with the winds blowing, besides radio, books. He also commented that many revolutionaries came to see him and he was happy to hear that his biographies would be published in France and in America. Many of the Indian revolutionaries who were imprisoned and freed came to see him, in the Red Aid Home. His poem "Mukto Birder Proti" was read there. He wrote to Bhupen on October 3 saying his fever was over 100, but he enjoyed writing letters lying down. After a few days of staying in the Home, he returned to his home in Shyambazar. After returning, he ate and drank irregularly, and wandered around, which gave him a fever. He rested according to a doctor's advice, and stopped wandering around. Rakhal Bhattacharya took him from his home in East Kolkata to Shyambazar. Before he left, the poem "Hey Mahajiban" was found under his pillow.

Sukanta Bhattacharya stayed for two months in Shyambazar and was visited by many writers and a Soviet youth wing. In the place, his second eldest brother Rakhal Bhattacharya and middle sister-in law took care of him. While he was bedridden, he carried on writing poems, stories and letters. He wrote his poem "Lenin" when he was bedridden. He was gifted an expensive pen by student leader Alka Mazumdar and Ramakrishna Maitra gave him a collection of poems in English by Louis Aragon. Some of his poems were translated into French. He was unwilling to leave Shyambazar and wanted to be put in a suburban hospital. Before he left, hid a package in a cupboard. It was later found to be a gift from Tarashankar Bandyopadhyay. On 1 April 1947, he was admitted into the Jadavpur Tuberculosis Hospital. At this time, his poems were published in various languages. He became the youngest poet to be featured in the English collection of modern Bengali poetry published by Signet Press. "The Bookman" put out his first book of poems. "International Publishing House" printed the book "Ghumtarani Chhora" in which his poems were present.

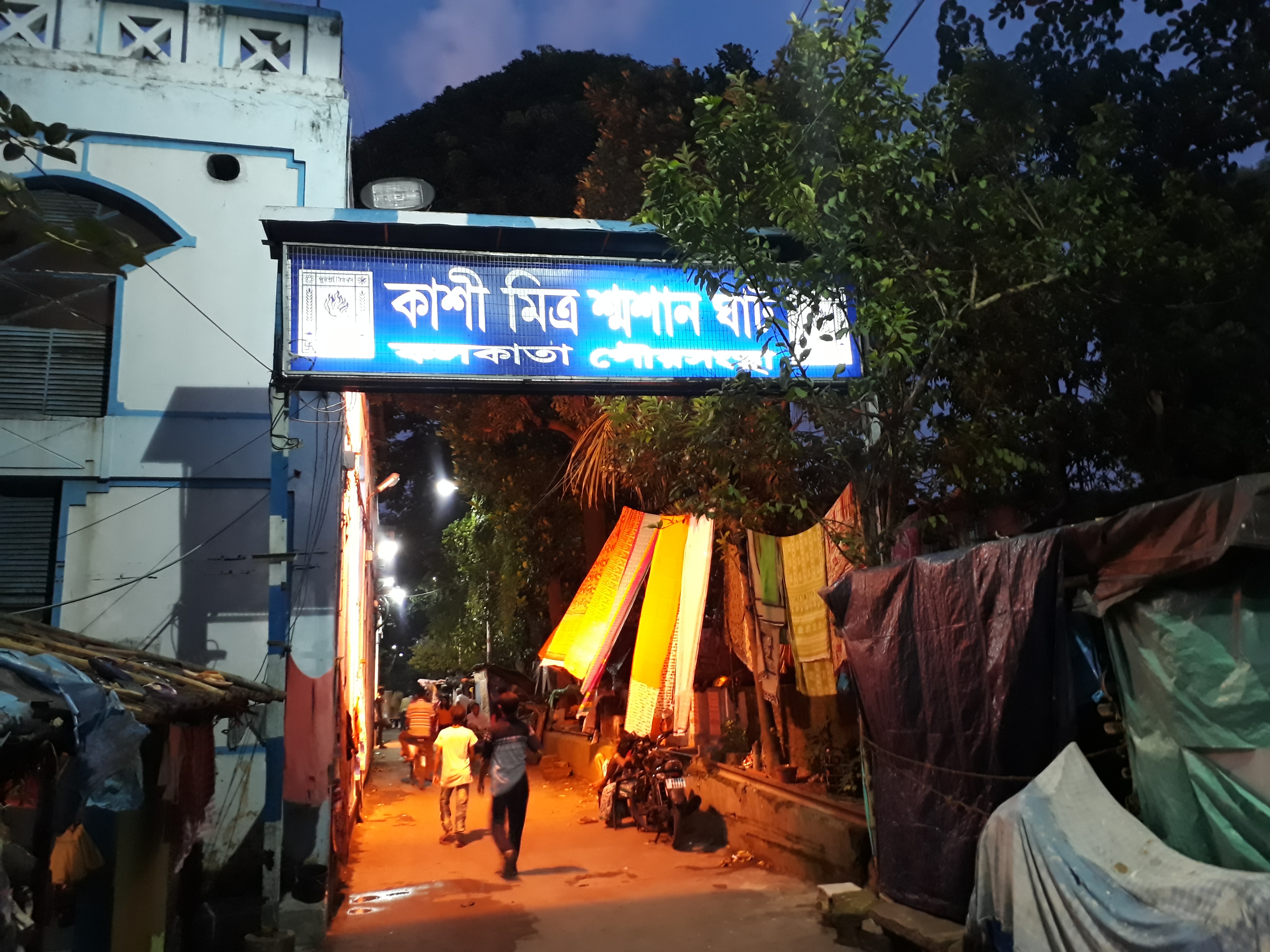
Kashi Mitra crematorium, where Bhattacharya was cremated

Bhattacharya stayed in Room Number One of the Mary Herbert Ward. According to Ashok Bhattacharya, the nurses and doctors in the hospital cared for money and did not take good care of the patients. He was mostly alone in the hospital and would be excited when someone came to meet him. Other than his friends and relatives, student activists and writer Pavitra Gangopadhyay visited him.

Jagannath Chakravorty tried to visit him often, but sometimes unable to because of the trains or rumored conditions. According to Chakravorty, he was also lonely in the hospital compared to his staying in Shyambazar, and he saw Sukanta last on 9 May 1947. A few days before he died, Bhattacharya said he would bring his paternal aunt-in-law to his room. On 9 May 1947, he showed Chakravorty an eight-line poem starting with "Oh great life," which Chakravorty recited back to him. This was the last poem written by Sukanta. It was known in Bengali as "Hey Mahajiban," which later became anthemic of Bhattacharya. According to Chakravorty, he died at the age of 21 as a major and established poet, and called Sukanta as a phenomenon in Indian literature. Sukanta Bhattacharya died in the early hours of 13 May 1947 (29 Boishakh 1354 in Bengali Calendar).

His body was not taken through a procession because of the occurrence of communal riots on the day of his death. According to Debabrata Mukhopadhyay, his body was carried on a truck (lorry) to the Kashi Mitra crematorium (burning ghat), accompanied by one or two relatives and some of his friends. His body was cremated. His death was sorrowed by his family, friends and Communists.

== Writing style and themes ==
The Hammer and sickle is associated with Marxism, which was the political party taken by him.

Sukanta Bhattacharya's 42 poems were translated into English, as of 1979. As a Marxist poet, he wielded his pen against fascist aggression, the Second World War, the Bengal famine of 1943, communal riots etc. His poems, which described the sufferings of the common people and their struggle for existence, looked forward to an exploitation-free society. He wrote poems against and built resistance to Adolf Hitler, Benito Mussolini and Hideki Tojo. He was opposed to totalitarianism and participated in people's movements against it. He wrote poetry based on liberation of India, to accompany Indian natives fighting for freedom. In his early literary career, he suited to traditional writing, later changing his style into revolutionary themes. He was influenced by the poetry of Rabindranath Tagore, giving noticeable indication from his early life. His poetic language was marked by colloquial Bengali, irony and his own ability to stand upon himself. He frequently wrote children's verses and limericks. Bhattacharya loved listening to the music of Rabindranath. He composed songs by himself while listening to his songs, as said in his poetry book Giti Guccha. He was influenced by Tagore in the rhyming of poems and in the intensity of emotions. From an early age, he worked on mastering the poem styles written by Tagore such as his word choices, writing techniques and styles.

According to Saroj Mohan Mitra, it is unknown when he first started writing. The poem he had written with a pencil to annoy Kaliratan may had been his first writing. His uncle Manoj Bhattacharya wrote that his poem "Roma Rani Dui Bon Porir Moton" shown in Jasidish was his first poem that rhymed. His friend Shailen Sarkar wrote that he had written a funny story in the magazine Sanchay while in Kamal Vidya Mandir. His first work on Vivekananda was published in Shikha. He wrote many poems before he entered politics. He was deeply affected by the West, while writing poetry in the afternoon, he was aware of the economic conditions and imperialist wars that appeared on newspapers. He was partially attracted by the war news and economics, but was used to it and did not find anything new. The destructions and divisions of the war separated him from his usual style of beauty and nature.

After his sister Ranidi died, he wrote a letter to his mejo boudi (middle sister-in-law): "I want to be a poet of the people. Without the people, there is no poetry in me. I'm above and beyond a communist." His first anthology book was taken to printers while he was in the Jadavpur T.B. Hospital, and was named Chharpatra (The Entry Pass). His friends and Subhas Mukherjee wanted to publish this book. Chharpatra was a collection of his poems written between 1943 and 1947. Sukanta saw the file copy of the book when it went to printers, but could not decide on its name. One week remained for its publication after he saw it. The book was published on its scheduled time with the cover designed by Satyajit Ray, but Bhattacharya had died. After he died, it was named on the first poem of the book "Chharpatra." It was first published in June–July 1947 (Asharh 1354 in Bengali calendar). While he did see Chharpatra before he died, it was not mass produced until his death. He earned the sobriquet "Kabi Sukanta" (Note: Also spelled as "Kavi Sukanta".) for writing from young age. Though he was raised in a city, his poems also reflected his feelings for nature and the environment. His feelings for nature is best shown in "Chirodiner", "Chil", "Agami" and "Bibriti". His written poems would be sometimes be written when he was depressed, and sometimes also hopeful and brave. He frequently used metaphors and similes, sometimes discarding aesthetics. He felt sad for the poor and needy. In contrast to the prevalent hunger, he compared the full moon to a burned chapati or roti in his poem "Hey Mahajiban", asking poetry to focus more on the social problems like hunger. He was nicknamed "John Keats of Bengal", for his similarity to John Keats, an English romantic poet, who died young at age 25 and also of tuberculosis.

His political ideology and beliefs are rooted in the exploited, deprived and working people. His writing style was in a way to spread unity among Bengal, resolving differences between people and filling the gaps of hungry, thirsty people. He presented in poetic forms social and political awareness and eagerness that a perfect society would be built. His medium of writing poetry served in Bhattacharya's major aspects of disregarding fascism, imperialism and capitalism and his revolutionary, rebellious stances, frequently writing poems and writings for the common, ordinary people. He showed opposition to money-lenders, zamindars, corrupt revenue collectors and others.

Bhattacharya was opposed to Fascism.

His poems "Sipay Bidroho", "Aajob Lorai", "Purano Dhadha", "Black market" and "Prithibir Dike Takao" were included in his poetry collection book Mithekoda. A review of the book was published by Hirankumar Sanyal in Porichoy Patrika, an editor of the magazine in November–December 1947. The book was also published in 1947, according to Saroj Mohan Mitra. His poems were translated into languages such as French, Russian, German, Czech and English. In 1953, a book of his poems called "Khuda O Bidrohor Gan" was published in Czech. Purbabhas, his third poetry collection book, states in the preface that the poems were written by him when he was 12 or 13 years old. It contains 39 poems by him. However, the first poem named "Purbabhas" references the Second World War and the Japanese invasion, which happened in 1941–1942. "Oshhojo Din" and "Uddog" also mention the War.

The poem "Porabhob" mentions Manyantar (famine) and was influenced by his involvement in communism. "Bibhishaner Proti" was written after Somen Chand's death. "Durmar" was based on the Tebhaga movement. These poems and others were not written when he was 12 or 13, but at a later age. Saroj Mohan Mitra says that the poems were published in the order they were collected, and not in alphabetical order. He was deeply committed to lessening the influence of bourgeois politics and wanted to establish a new communist society, striving to change socio-economical activities through his literary career. As a "Poet of the people" working for the masses, activists and natives, he remained vastly unappreciated for his opposition to the then prevailing British government.

His collection of writings and letters were published in Sukanta Samagra, which was also published after his death in 1967. His poems first started circulation when he was 14 years old, said by Subhas Mukhopadhyay. In his poetry writings, Sukanta followed his own style distinct from Rabindranath Tagore and Kazi Nazrul Islam. He primary used precision words and metaphors for sensibility of the readers. Unlike Nazrul Islam's use of matrabritta, which is a fast-faced Bengali rhythm system, Bhattacharya employed the use of aksharbritta, a slow-paced Bengali rhythm style in most of his poems. He wrote some poems in matrabritta. In his revolutionary poems, he used conjoined consonants to create a sonic effect. Bhattacharya was highly committed to Marxism, and his actions in course of activism. His initial poetry was an inclination of him towards Communism and Socialism. In his poem "Thikana", he described himself as a wandered or nomad.

=== Poetry works ===
Some of his poems are:

- To Rabindranath
- A Sapling
- The Staircase
- The Pen
- The Volcano
- Kashmir
- Chittagong: 1943
- The Kite
- The Suppliant

Source: (Note: The poem names are translated into English, they were originally in Bengali.)

=== Books ===
His works are deeply marked and influenced by his communist experience. His poetry books include:

- Chharpatra (1948)
- Ghum Nei (1950)
- Purbabhas (1950)
- Abhijan (1953)
- Mithe-Koda (1951)
- Hartal (1962)
- Giti Guccha (1965)

Source: (Note: Romanized from Bengali to English.)

Regarding his anthology book Chharpatra, Mamata Banerjee gave out a statement in March 2025.

An excerpt from his poem "Durmor" signifies his love and passion towards his country:

সাবাস বাংলাদেশ!
এ পৃথিবী অবাক তাকিয়ে রয়
জ্বলে পুড়ে মরে ছারখার
তবু মাথা নোয়াবার নয়।

Meaning in English: "Bravo Bangladesh! (Note: Present-day Bangladesh did not exist then, here the term Bangladesh refers to the pre-partition undivided Bengal (See also: Names of Bengal).) The world is amazed! fired, burned, died and destroyed, but never gave up!" In this poem, Bhattacharya points to a brave and rebellious Bangladesh that does not bow its head to injustice.

== Legacy ==
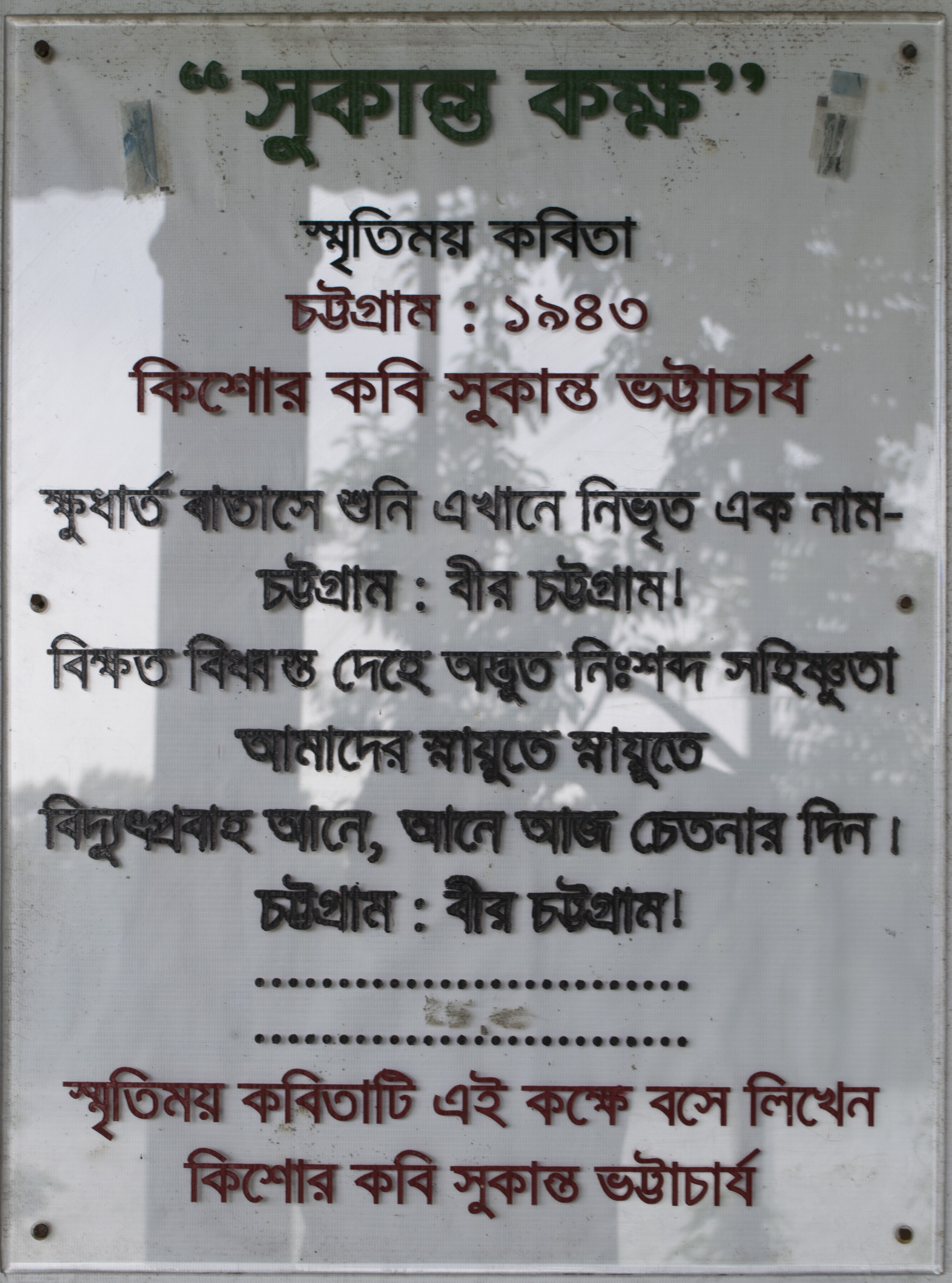
Plaque dedicated to Sukanta Bhattacharya at the Kadurkhil High School, Chittagong, Bangladesh.

He died from tuberculosis, three months before the Partition of India. He was a paternal uncle of Buddhadeb Bhattacharya, former Chief Minister of West Bengal.

After his death, several contemporary poets of his time wrote about his death, including Buddhadeb Basu, who wrote that his death was surprising; Arun Mitra, who wrote that it would had been good if his disease-affected lungs had been cured; Subhas Mukhopadhyay, who wrote that Bengali literature recognized him as an amazing talent, even though he lived for only twenty-one years. Manik Bandyopadhyay wrote the poem named "Sukanta Bhattacharya" in memory of him. Tarashankar Bandyopadhyay also wrote about Bhattacharya.

His ancestral home was in Kotalipara Upazila in Gopalganj District in Bangladesh. The mural of the house was built by Upazila Parishad in 2016. As of December 2019, the walls that protected the mural were broken. The mural was covered in dirt and dust. Local poet Mintu Roy said that a library and four-day fair was held in his memory. Ashok Karmakar, the president of Kotalipara unit and organizer of the discussions, expressed sadness on the deteriorating condition of the mural and said that his festival would be celebrated a few days later from his saying because the conditions of the country were a bit different at that time. After being abandoned by his family, it remained unoccupied and uninhabited, and was later encroached, and later released on September 27, 2006. In 2020, Aynal Hossian Sheikh, president of Sukanta Smriti Sangsad remarked that the death anniversary of Bhattacharya would not be celebrated on large scale because of coronavirus. His birth and death anniversaries are not celebrated officially by the government or by any private entity as of May 2020. Many people have expressed disappointment and anger encompassing this regard. In 2023, Mukta Mancha was inaugurated by Sheikh Hasina in the house. (Note: Sources:) Sheikh Hasina, the former Prime Minister of Bangladesh regarded Bhattacharya as one of her favorite poets.

In his memory, an auditorium and a library was built by the government. It is visited by tourists from different parts of the county. A rural fair lasting five days is held in this home in the first week of March every year; poets from India and Bangladesh participate in it. Roy remarked that it was not possible to pass Bhattacharya's effects to the next generation with only one fair per year. He commented wanting his birth and death anniversaries to be celebrated nationally. In 2022, Education Minister Dipu Moni visited his ancestral home. And in 2014, painter Jogen Chowdhury visited his ancestral home in Kotalipara Upazila after 21 years. He also went to Bhattacharya's ancestral home. In 2025, tributes to him were paid by placing flowers on his portrait, hosting a recitation and a meeting. Delwar Hossain Sardar, advocate and president of Sukanta Seva Sangha commented:

সুকান্তের বাবা নিবারণ ভট্টাচার্য মাদারীপুরে চাকরি করতেন। দেশ বিভক্তের আগেই তিনি কোটালীপাড়ার পৈতৃক ভিটা ফেলে রেখে কলকাতা চলে যান। পরে আমরা মামলা করে কবির পৈতৃক ভিটামাটি অবৈধ দখলদারদের হাত থেকে উদ্ধার করি। কবির স্মৃতি ধরে রাখতে কবির পৈতৃক ভিটায় অডিটোরিয়াম ও লাইব্রেরি নির্মাণ করেছে সরকার। এখানে রয়েছে একটি সংগ্রহশালা। আগামী প্রজন্মের কাছে কবির বিপ্লবী চেতনাকে তুলে ধরতে হবে। তা হলেই নতুন প্রজন্ম কবির জীবন ও আদর্শ সম্পর্কে জানতে পারবে।

Sukanta's father Nibaran Bhattacharya used to work in Madaripur. Before the partition of the country, he left his ancestral house and went to Kolkata. Afterwards, by filing a lawsuit, we took the ancestral home from the hands of illegal occupants. To hold onto the remembrance of the poet, an auditorium and library was established by the government at his ancestral home. There is a museum here. The revolutionary spirit of the poet has to be held before the new generation. Thereby the new generations will get to know about his life and manners.

The mural and house is located about 1 kilometer from the headquarters of Kotalipara Upazila, near Sikir Bazar intersection. It was constructed under the initiative of Deputy Commissioner Md. Khalilur Rahman in 2016. It is viewable by the residents of the Upazila and by passengers traveling across the Gopalgang–Poisahat Road. The date of birth stated in the mural was "August 16, 1926", which was inconsistent with Ashok Bhattacharya's book, which said his birth to be August 15, 1926, this was also true for Google and Wikipedia. The district website listed his birth year as 1925, with no specific dates. Upazila Press Club president Mizanur Rahman said that his exact birth must be determined through research and demanded his birth to be availably nationally and publicized.

A fair in his name titled "Sukanta Mela" is held in the first week of March every year, as his birth month of August is considered a "month of mourning for Bengalis." The fair lasting five days includes the decoration of surrounding areas of his mural. His death anniversary is also handled in a similar way, involving poetry reading, writing, painting competitions and participation of writers. In 2023, Deputy Commissioner Kazi Mahabubul Alam inaugurated it by lighting a lamp at Unshia village. The fair was jointly organized by Ministry of Cultural Affairs and Gopalganj district administration. Kazi Mahabubul Alam expressed that the revolutionary spirit of Bhattacharya would be spread among everyone through the fair. Book fairs, with some consisting of Bhattacharya's books were set up. Among them, furniture and food stalls were set. Kazi Alam said he wanted to make the Sukanta Mela the same form as Madhu Mela in Jessore. In 2026, Nitai Roy Chowdhury inaugurated the Mela. Also, on May 13, 2026, Chief Minister Suvendu Adhikari paid tributes to Bhattacharya by posting on social media.

A procession was held on August 16, 2025 from Sealdah to College Street by the Sukanta Bhattacharya birth centenary celebration committee, celebrating the centenary (100th birthday) of Bhattacharya, its organizers said him to be relevant even today. The student-youth festival started from that day, and according to the organizations of SFI and DYFI, it would continue through the months of October and November. The slogan was chosen as "Somoy Hoyeche Notun Khobor Anar" (It Is Time to Bring New News). Members and organizers of the "Kishore Bahini" including Piyush Dhar and Deepika Thakur Chakraborty joined it from Sealdah. Biman Basu issued a special release of the Kishore Bahini magazine before it started. The celebration of three major Bengali literature Kazi Nazrul Islam, Rabindranath and Sukanta called "Rabindra-Nazrul-Sukanta" was held in Sydney.

In 2018, actor Anirban Chakraborty, known for playing the role of Eken Babu, posted a picture of himself on Facebook with a style similar to Sukanta's only authentic picture, depicting keeping his palm on his cheek. The post text said that he had played Sukanta's role in a Doordarshan episode earlier and found the image then, and posted it.

S. M. Jilani, Member of Parliament of Gopalganj 3, in a meeting announced the introduction of a drug-free society based on the ideas and theories of Bhattacharya, his main protests including inequality, hunger and deprecation. He spoke about starting the society as the chief guest of Sukanta Mela, in the Kotalipara Upazila Parishad Hall room on May 3, 2026. He remarked that Bhattacharya's poems clearly describe the inequality between the rich and poor, grievances of the hungry and building an equal and justified society. Jilani described the need to build social resistance against drug usage is a priority, and this would also keep the cultural impact of Sukanta. It was proclaimed that discussions, programs, rural fairs would be held for three days in memory of Bhattacharya.

On March 5, 2026, the eighth day, 92 new books arrived in the Ekushey Book Fair, held in Bangladesh. A discussion named Jonmoshotoborsho: Sukanta Bhattacharya was held in the Fair, starting from 3 p.m. on that day. It was presided by Abdul Hair Shikder. Sumon Sajjad presented the paper in the discussion. He remarked that although he was called a "teenage poet", his poetry was not much concerned about the youth. His poetry depicted struggles of Kashmir, Paris and Stalingrad. He described on his criticism of the Colonial rule and advocation of a freedom movement. Ahmed Mawla in the same meeting said that, he had spread talent in his short life. Inspired by Marxism, he wanted class consciousness and used poetry as the main tool for social change. Abdul Hai Sikdar said Bhattacharya was a worth successor of Kazi Nazrul Islam, and that his lines were repeated in Bengali struggles, fights and discussions.

In Bengali school syllabus or curriculum, his poem "Chirodiner" is only taught in class seven, as a rebellious poem read by students aged twelve or thirteen. His poem "Age of Eighteen" (আঠারো বছর বয়স) was earlier featured in eleventh or twelfth class, where students read it around the age of eighteen, but was removed. Among other contemporary poetry writers Rabindranath Tagore and Kazi Nazrul Islam, his poems was the only exemption. Chilean poet Pablo Neruda, a Nobel Laureate in Literature is also featured in the syllabus, the poem "Ashukhi Ekjon". Sumanta Bagchi, a teacher, wrote that the reason of the removal of "Age of Eighteen" was because the poem was related to the Left Front writer Buddhadeb Bhattacharya, which the Trinamool government did not like. His poems were dropped from the upper-primary syllabus upon the change of curriculum from 2011, when Trinamool Congress formed government. There were debates on his poem removals. As of March 2024, the inclusion of his poem "Bodhon" was discussed. In April 2012, Avik Majumdar, chairman of WBCHSE said that Bhattacharya's poems would be deleted from the school syllabus because they lacked diversity. Majumdar furthermore said that Sukanta died at an early age that robbed him to writing diversified poetry. This decision was marked by dissatifaction among other members. It was decided to keep his poetry, and "Priyatomashu" was added.

The room inside the Jadavpur Tuberculosis Hospital where he spent his last days was taken over by KPC Medical College and Hospital. The lock on the door was unlocked by the hospital staff and his bust inside was garlanded by the Sangoj Cultural Organization, including members Pranab Mukherjee, (Note: Does not refer to the 13th President of India Pranab Mukherjee.) Subrata Bhattacharya, Kalpana Deshmukh and Sunil Mondal. Fruit and sweets were distributed among residents. The before-government-hospital was given to KPC under the Left Front government. Other organizations and employees of the Jadavpur Hospital expressed their desires to maintain his bust, which was plastered.

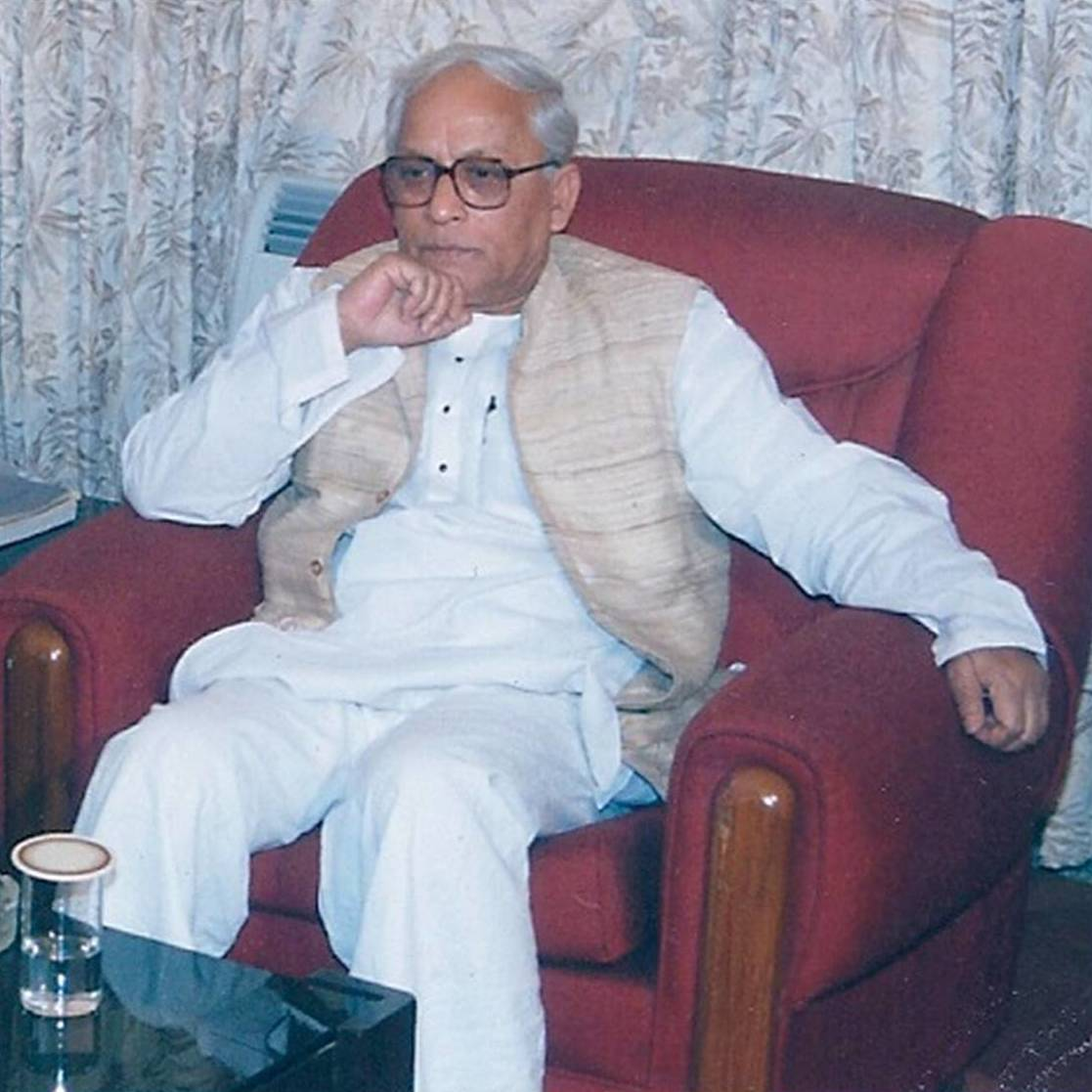
Buddhadeb Bhattacharya

Buddhadeb Bhattacharya was born on March 1, 1944, three years before Sukanta Bhattacharya died. He got very little time to spend with Sukanta. Whenever he met with Kolim Shorafi, a friend of Sukanta, he would ask him about his uncle (Sukanta). He listened to various incidents including literature and culture narrated by Shorafi, which had influence on Buddhadeb. He opted a style of writing similar to Sukanta. Buddhadeb wrote "Fire Dekha", about the first and last ten years of Left Front government and The birth and death of Nazi Germany inspired by Sukanta. Sukanta Bhattacharya's house in 42, Mahim Haldar Street was occasionally visited by Buddhadeb Bhattacharya to inquire about him. At the times he went to visit, he did not yet become the Chief Minister, but was still a leader of Left Front. The house was made of mud. He visited the house after becoming the Chief Minister, but less. Although the house was originally quite large, part of it was demolished in 1974 to widen the roads beside it. Later, the Sukanta Smriti Library was built on the remaining part of the house. Kolkata Municipality gave land to expand the library further. Musicians like Salil Chowdhury and Hemanta Mukhopadhyay and poets went to the Mahim Halder Street house to perform songs on Bhattacharya's birthday.

Bhattacharya spent most of his life at a house in 34, Haramohan Ghosh Lane. That house is still intact as of May 2025. Bhattacharya's younger brothers Bibhas Bhattacharya and Amiya Bhattacharya live nearby to this house in their own homes.

A meeting was held in the Bir Muktijoddha M. Abu Saleh Auditorium under the initiative of the Chittagong Sahitya Pathachak for the memory of Bhattacharya, its chairman was Babul Kanti Das. The chief guest of the meeting was Awami League politician Kabu Abu Tayyab. Poet Ashish Sen was the main discusser of the meeting. A "Poetry Reading and Recitation Program" at Academy's National Art Gallery Auditorium in Bangladesh Shilpakala Academy on November 20, 2024. The program was presided by Dr. Syed Jamil Ahmed. In the poetry program, Sukanta Bhattacharya's poem "Deshlai Kathi" would be recited by Faizul Alam Pappu.

In the film Adamya dedicated to Aparna Sen, Bhattacharya's poem "Deshlai Kathi" was used in a rap form and sung by Aryuun Ghosh. Depicting the circumstances of a low-income boy, the song and the visuals were in the film directed by Ranjan Ghosh. The song was composed by Abhijit Kundu and its mixing was done by B. Thiru. It was released as a video on January 15, 2026. The song received positive feedback upon its release. A person, regarding the song said that if a matchstick could sing, this would be it. Another Sukanta's poem named "Aathero Bochor Boyesh" or "Age of Eighteen" was composed by music director Bappa Mazumdar, assessed on the eighteenth anniversary of Prothom Alo. The composed song was sung by singers Dilshad Nahar Kona, Elita Karim, Parvez (Note: It is not clearly defined by Prothom Alo who "Parvez" refers to.) and Bappa Mazumdar. Considering the song, Mazumdar commented that when Prothom Alo asked him for a composition, he thought about how to compose it. When he went to compose to, he remarked that a youth aspect should also had been present in it. He remarked creating the melody in such a way that the youth would like listening to it.

== Public perception ==
Ashok Bhattacharya described him as a person who did not have many distinct facial features to be distinguished from others. He described Bhattacharya as a medium-sized man with a slightly muscular body build. He had high amounts of hair on head and would keep his head slightly tilted forwards. He said Bhattacharya to be normally wearing a dhuti and a shirt, with the shirt's sleeves rolled up to his elbows. He held the front part of his dhuti with his hand or a bag when he had one. Ashok Bhattacharya remarked walking on the extreme edge or side of the road to be his habit.

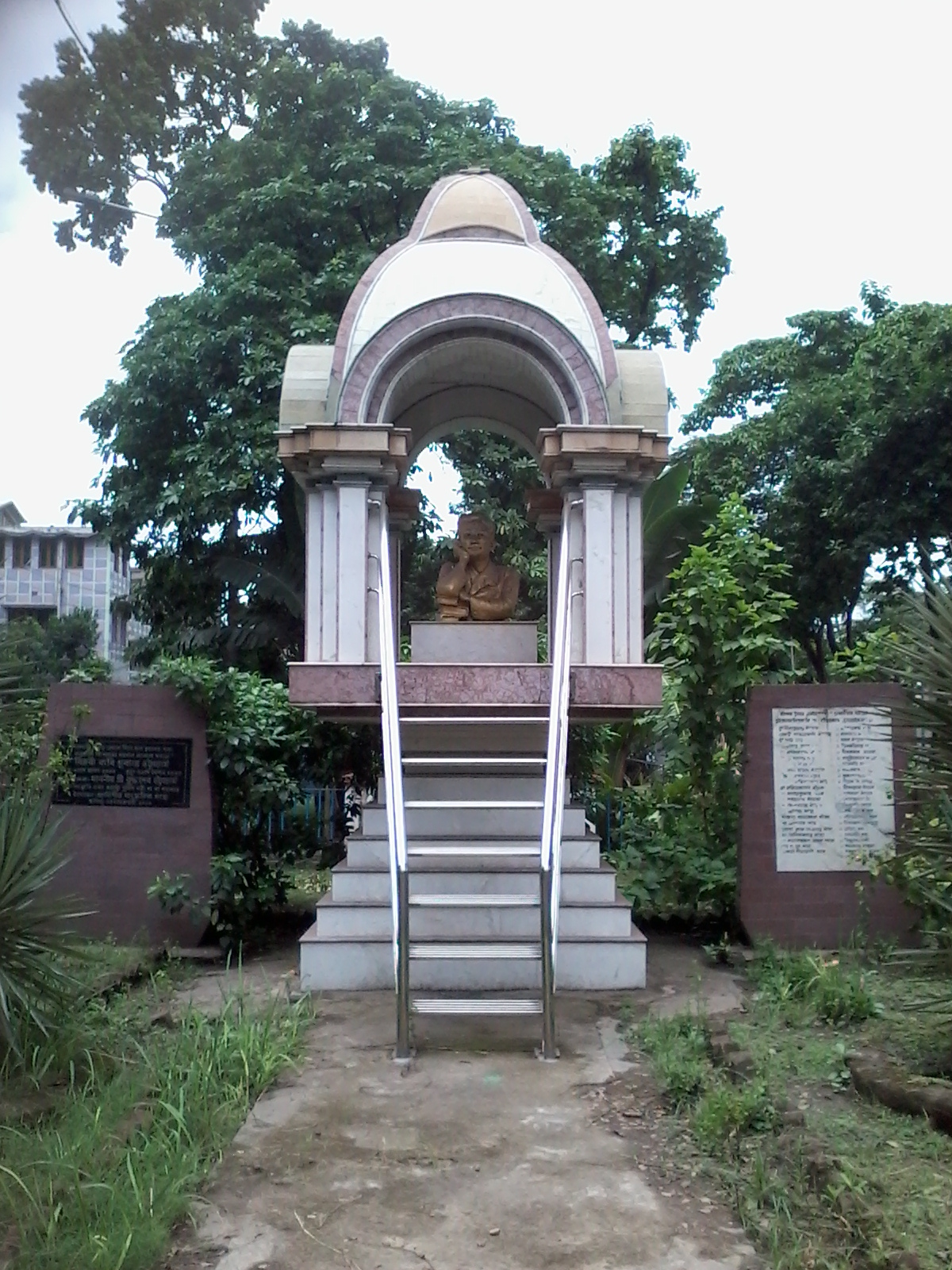
A statue of Sukanta.

Bahauddin Golap wrote that, in the world of Bengali literature, Sukanta Bhattacharya became a "crisis manager", transforming Marxist materialism into poetry rhythm. He made a radical change in the art of poetry. With exploitations perpetrated across the land, he got aware and his peace was taken away. Examples include the World War II, Bengal Famine and others. He writes that similar to Pablo Neruda in his collection Spain in Our Hearts, where he abandons aestheticism, Bhattacharya in a similar way abandoned romanticism and worked out on the reality. Art theorist Walter Benjamin wanted art to be taken and put into political uses. Sukanta used harsh words like "bojro" and "moron jongo", which were political slogans used in active action. Bhattacharya wrote poems that gave the warning messages of a bad outcome, marked by disaster, death and unrealistic dreams. Bahauddin Golap compared the call of Bhattacharya using "indifference" and "false consciousness" as the gateway to evil, with Conscientization by Paulo Freire, where he advocates the nation to become active. His poems gathered relevance in 2026, with wars such as Russo-Ukrainian war. He comments the Sukanta's poem "Jagbar Din Aaj" to be a reminder to Jean-Paul Sartre's book "Being and Nothingness" in 1943. Through this poem, he explains the need to have awoken the ordinary people and forces.

When Bhattacharya first fell ill, the responsibility of treating him fell on Sunil Kumar Bose. After Rakhal Chandra Bhattacharya transferred him to Shyambazar from East Kolkata, he was treated by the doctor Tapas Kumar Bose. Muzaffar Ahmed wrote in his book Sukanta Bichitra, that with a little effort, a cabin was found in the Jadavpur Tuberculosis Hospital. Bhattacharya was admitted there. However, after he was admitted to the hospital, Sukanta's health continued to worsen. On a morning, upon receiving the news, Ahmed along with Rakhal Bhattacharya went to see him in the hospital. But when they, reached Bhattacharya had died. Ahmed also wrote in his memoirs, while he was being taken to the hospital, his car passed through Deckers' Lane. Sukanta Bhattacharya met him at the gate, and he held Muzaffar Ahmed's hand for a long time, remarking that they would not meet ever again.

Anisur Rahman wrote about Bhattacharya that, Sukanta dreamed about a livable future world, where a newborn demanded for his rights to the new world. Bhattacharya understood the importance of human rights, and promised to leave behind a new world for these children replacing the old, worn deleterious world. Rahman writes that this is evident in his book "Chharpatra", where he demands a new society free of exploitation, classes and injustice. He compares the situations described in his poems in the book to a song by the band Moheener Ghoraguli. In Bhattacharya's poem "Agami", he deems the habitable world and the principle of human rights, pointing out the responsibilities and duties of people. He further writes that in the poem "Ekti Moroger Kahini", it serves an illusion of going to the dining room to get good food and a beautiful life, but realizing the end as food in the dining table plate.

Bhorer Kagoj, a newspaper, reported that the main theme of Bhattacharya's poetry was rebellion and continuous struggle of the working and ordinary people against injustice and exploitation. His poetry is relatable to the masses of his country. It is also written that Bhattacharya's poems gave strength and courage to the Bengalis during the Bangladesh Liberation War. The newspaper highlighted his poems and trends to continue in every movement and struggle of the Bengalis. The protests, lives of people, their struggles, and exploitations are represented in his poetry. Bhorer Kagoj continued that, his talent is what revolutionary means; his sacrificed his box-like life in the penance in an effort to reinforce the aspirations and demands of people of his country.

Md. Altaf Hossain, Acting Director General of Bangla Academy held a discussion in the Poet Shamsur Rahman Seminar Room of Bangla Academy on June 20, 2013. At the meeting, essayist and professor Kajal Banerjee presented an article called "Sukanta Bhattacharya: Poet-Guide of the Left Renaissance". He stated that Bhattacharya was the portrait of Leftist Renaissance and had captured the human sense of betrayal in poetry and was committed despite a complex period in history. He said that those who want to belittle him in today's world are basically enemies of liberation. He described Bhattacharya to have not been necessarily a worshipper of Marxism, but his dedication to catch to consciousness of the people was just. Professor Sirajul Islam Chowdhury said he was not a poet of oblivion. His philosophy, patriotism and history knowledge led to the rise of revolutionary poems.

In the introduction to Sukanta Samagra, Parthajit Gangopadhyay wrote,

In the poetry of a poet conscious of the turning point of the era, there was no mention of flowers and butterflies. There was talk of the suffering of the era, of people. There was also talk of hope and light. The poet of the new era has conveyed the message of a new day. Not only about this country, but Sukanta had a global consciousness. Many significant events of the world that were happening in his time are mentioned in his poetry. Strongly aware of the times, strongly responsible to people. Sukanta dreamed of an exploitation-free society, showed us his dream. His poetry was written for the needs of the era, and it would be a big mistake to think that its relevance has also faded with the change of era. His poetry keeps us awake and will keep us awake. He is a source of inspiration.

In a review of Bhattacharya's poetry, authors Ahmad Mahbub-ul-Alam, Samia Islam and Mohammad Ehsanul Islam Khan, wrote that Sukanta was a worshipper of nature and pursued the beauty of nature everywhere. They wrote that during his life span of twenty-one years, the poems that he wrote were acclaimed for their revolutionary ardor and themes and also for their artistic intelligence. He wished for a new world looking at the sufferings of the people. They wrote that his poems contributed significantly to the increment in social awareness. His use of metaphors and symbols show dedication for his commitment to the people. In his book Aschorjo Notun Ek Chokhe, Arunachal Basu remarked that Bhattacharya would be filled with joy whenever he encountered the beauty of nature. He focused on various subjects like villages, green fields, shepherds for writing poetry. He further expressed that his works for the needy, determination for liberation, and his gaze for the beauty, essence and fragrance of world could not have been hidden.

== Collections ==
- His complete writings were anthologized in Sukanta Samagra (Complete Works of Sukanta; 1957), published by the Saraswat Library, Kolkata and was edited by Subhash Mukhopadhyay. Researchers translated the book into English. The Bengali version is available on Wikisource: সুকান্ত সমগ্র (in Bengali) – via Wikisource. This Samagra includes all his printed texts, writings, his plays and stories, which include Khudha (Hunger), Durboddho (Incomprehensible), Bhadralok (Gentleman) and Daradi Kishorer Swapna (Dream of a Compassionate Adolescent), an article, Chhanda O Abritti (Rhythm and Recitation) and also a selection of letters. It was published posthumously in both West Bengal and the East Bengal (Bangladesh).
- Patra Guchha (Letters).

== Selected poems ==
A selected list of published and unpublished poems and songs by Sukanta Bhattacharya:

Chharpatra

- Chharpatra
- Agami
- Rabindranther Proti
- Ekti Moroger Kahini
- Durashay Mrityu
- Lenin
- Thikana
- Deshlai Kathi

Mithekoda

- Bhejal
- Biye Barir Moja
- Meyeder Podobi
- Purono Dhadha
- Sipahi Bidroho

Ghum Nei

- Bikkhob
- Ek La May er Kobita
- Sabyasachi
- Bidrohor Gaan
- Abhibadhon
- Amar Esechi
- Ekushe November
- Din Bodoler Pala

Unpublished

- Choitrodiner Gaan
- Marshall Tito-r Proti
- Jonojuddher Gaan
- Borsho Bani
- Daradi Kishor
- Debdaru Gache Roder Jhalak

== In popular culture ==
=== General ===
The following are the things and places named after Sukanta Bhattacharya.

- On March 12, 2023, it was announced that five new metro stations would be introduced between the 5.4 km rail track stretch between Kavi Subhas and Hemanta Mukhopadhyay metro stations. Of these, the fourth station was named Kavi Sukanta metro station, after his nickname "Kabi/Kavi Sukanta". The station serves Kalikapur, a fast growing city in Calcutta with some high buildings. One of the primary reasons for its establishment was to provide fast travel to Park Street and Esplanade, which is a working place of many people. It was built according to the latest passenger facilities, having escalators and elevators.
- In North Kolkata, an auditorium officially titled Sukanta Mancha was named after Bhattacharya. It is located in Phool Bagan in North Kolkata. It remains mostly empty and somewhat decrepit. On March 24 and 25, 2018, an event of music was hosted in the auditorium, which was very different from those events held in cities such as Kala Mandir or Gyan March. In 2019, Kolkata Municipal Corporation was to take over its renovation, adding air condition, stage light, hall light and its own electric generator. The mayor of Kolkata approved of proceeding with it. The auditorium was constructed in 1996, and was hardly renovated.
- Kabi Sukanta Mahavidyalaya college was fully constructed and started its journey from December 6, 1986, named after Sukanta Bhattacharya. It provides education to the areas consisting Baidyabati, Bhadreswar and Champdany of Hooghly district.
- Sukanta College was built from the inspiration and namesake of him, with its establishment dating to 2008. In 2019, the College received permanent affiliation from University of Calcutta.
- Sukanta Mahavidyalaya was named after him, built on September 25, 1981 at Sukanta Nagar, Jalpaiguri district in West Bengal. It is a government-aided degree college, permanently affiliated to the University of North Bengal.
- Kabi Sukanta High School in Siliguri is named after his sobriquet, where cultural events and celebration took place in 2026.

=== Music ===
The following are the songs adapted from poems and lyrics by Sukanta Bhattacharya.

- Bhattacharya's poem "Ranar/Runner" [Chuteche] is considered to be one of his most unforgettable poems. It describes a runner or mailman whose job was to deliver letters to places far and wide. He is said to be running even late at night, he shows fear of bandits, but is more scared of when the sun rises before delivering them. The song version of the poem was sung by singer Hemanta Mukhopadhyay. The song he sang, about seven minutes, named "Ranar Chuteche Tai Jhum Jhum" was composed by composer Salil Chowdhury. One day, Salil Chowdhury came into his home and played some songs music. But Mukherjee did not like any of songs, making Chowdhury leave. But later, he came back to show "Ranar/Runner", another song to him. This time, Mukherjee agreed to sing the song. The song became the debut of Salil Chowdhury in Bengal. (Note: Two same sources:)
- His poems named "Abak Prtihibi" (Surprised World) and "Bidroho Aaj Bidroho Charidike" (Revolts today, revolts everywhere) were composed by Salil Chowdhury and transformed into a song.

Gallery

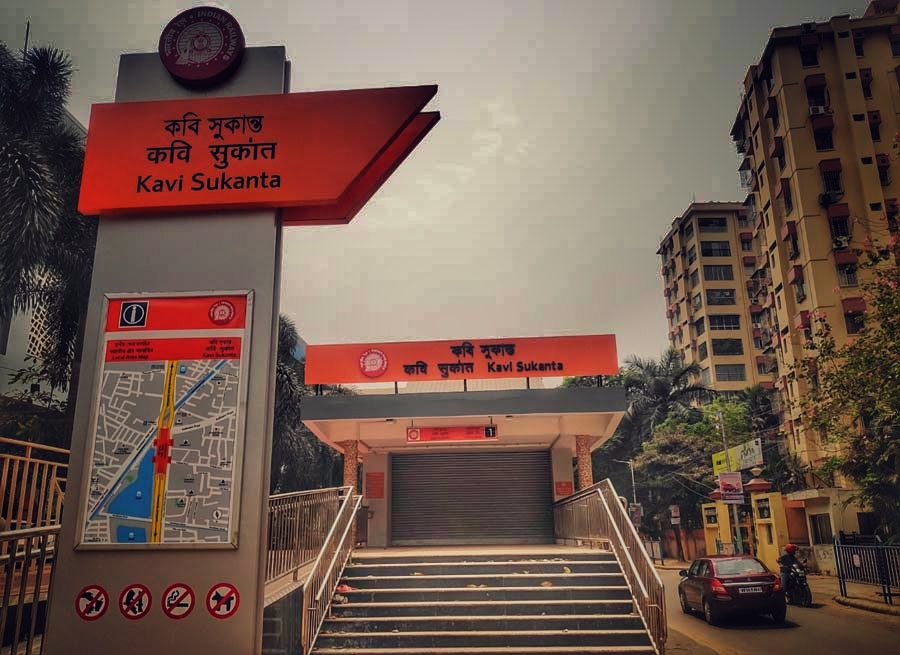
Kavi Sukanta Metro Station

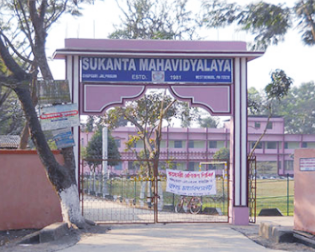
Sukanta Mahavidyalaya

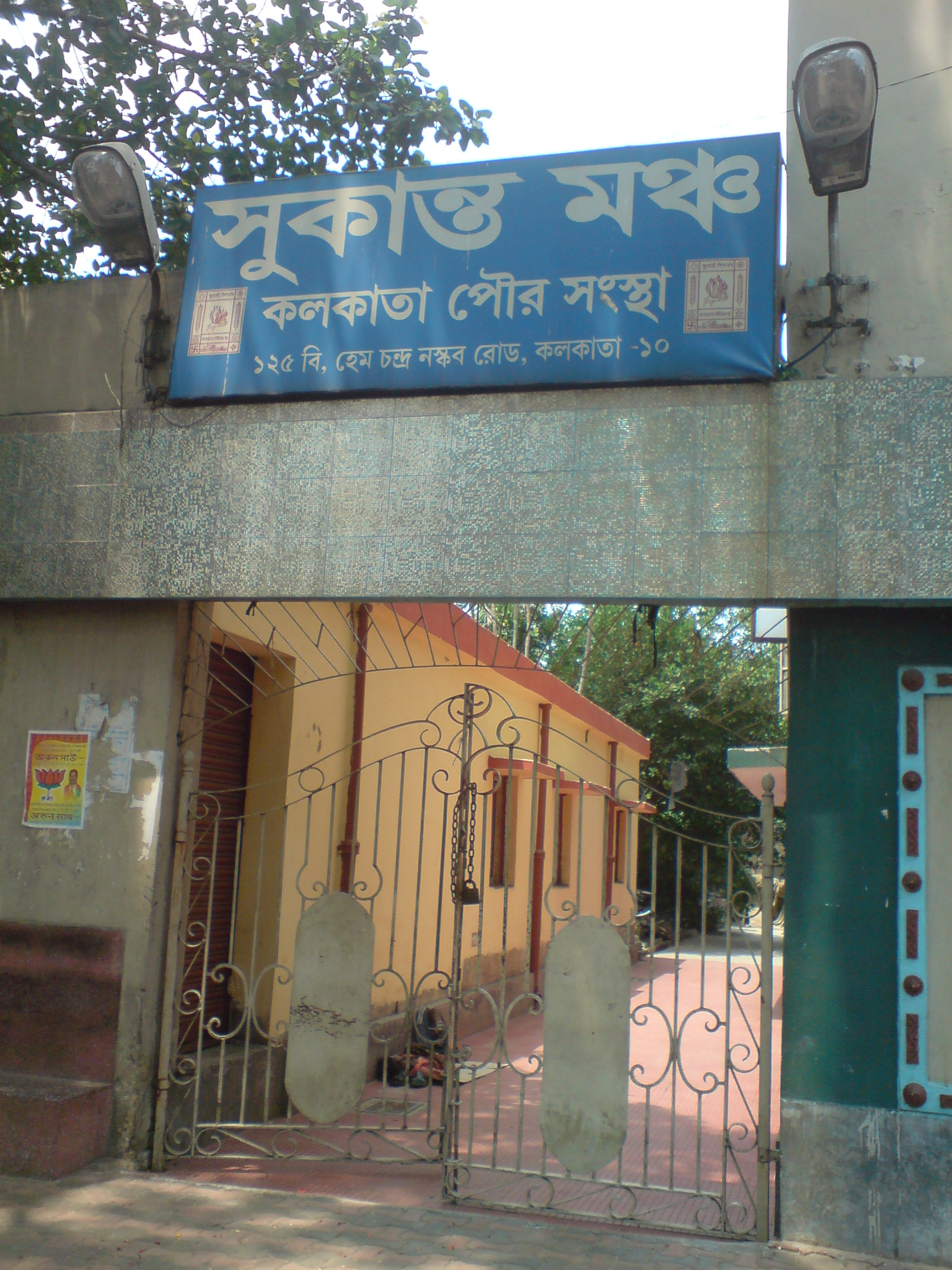
Sukanta Mancha

== See also ==
- Buddhadeb Bhattacharjee
- Subhas Mukhopadhyay
- Rabindranath Tagore
- Bengal Renaissance
- Sarat Chandra Chattopadhyay
- John Keats
- Anti-Fascism
- Empire of Japan
- World War II

== Cited works ==
=== Books and Journals ===
- K. M. George (1992). Modern Indian Literature, an Anthology: Surveys and poems. Sahitya Akademi. ISBN 978-81-7201-324-0. Archived from the original on 9 August 2024.
- Ray, Lila (1953). A Challenging Decade: Bengali Literature in the Forties. University of California: D. M. Library.
- Chakravorty, Jagannath (1991). Sukanta Bhattacharya. B. B. Ganguly Street, Calcutta: Sahitya Akademi. ISBN 81-7201-073-7.
- Bhattacharya, Ashok (September–October 1958). Kabi Sukanta [Poet Sukanta] (in Bengali) (1st ed.). Prosanto Bhattacharya, Saraswat Library.
- Mitra, Saroj Mohan (May 1990). Sukanter Jiban O Kabya [Sukanta's Life And Works] (PDF) (in Bengali). Kolkata: Firma K. L. Mukhopadhyay.
- Bhattacharya, Nandalal (2003). Life of Kabi Sukanta (in Bengali). Kolkata Book Fair: Grantha Tirtha. ISBN 81-7572-110-4.
- Bandyopadhyay, Asit Kumar (January–February 1991). Kishore Kabi Sukanta [Teenage Poet Sukanta] (in Bengali) (5th ed.). 5, Nabin Chandra Pal Lane, Kolkata-700009: Kamini Prakashalay.
- Ulanowicz, Anastasia; Basu, Manisha, eds. (14 February 2018). "Sukanta Bhattacharya's Famine Poetry". The Aesthetics and Politics of Global Hunger. Palgrave Macmillan, Springer Nature. ISBN 978-3-319-47484-7.
- Mukerjee, K. P. (August 1979). "Review: Sukanta Bhattacharya's Poetry". Social Scientist. 8 (1). Translated by Kshitish Roy. doi:10.2307/3520244. JSTOR 3520244.
- Banerjee, Manohar D. (May–June 1979). "Review: Sukanta Bhattacharya (A Selection of His Poems) by Kshitis Roy". Indian Literature. 22 (3). JSTOR 23329999.
- Bhattacharya, Amitendu (15 November 2022). ""Blood mist blurs my vision": Six poems by Sukanta Bhattacharya". Journal of Postcolonial Writing. 59 (5): 685–697. doi:10.1080/17449855.2022.2122860 – via Taylor & Francis.
- Bhattacharya, Amitendu (12 December 2020). "Selected Poems of Sukanta Bhattacharya: Translated from the Original Bengali". Asiatic: IIUM Journal of English Language and Literature. 14 (2): 144–147. doi:10.31436/asiatic.v14i2.2039 – via Asiatic.
- Mahbub-ul-Alam, Ahmad; Islam, Samia; Khan, Mohammad Ehsanul Islam (2024). "Exploring Sensuousness in Sukanta Bhattacharya". Ideas. 10: 21–34. eISSN 3005-8031. ISSN 2413-1818 – via Academia.
- Zuhori, Syed Taufiq (November 2016). সুকান্ত ভট্টাচার্যের কবিতা: প্রতিবাদী চেতনা [Sukanta Bhattacharya's Poetry: A Spirit of Protest]. A Research Journal (Faculty of Arts) (in Bengali). 22. University of Rajshahi: 35–50. ISSN 1813-0402 – via ResearchGate.
