= Sukanta Mancha =

Auditorium in Kolkata, India

Coordinates: 22°34′14″N 88°23′22″E

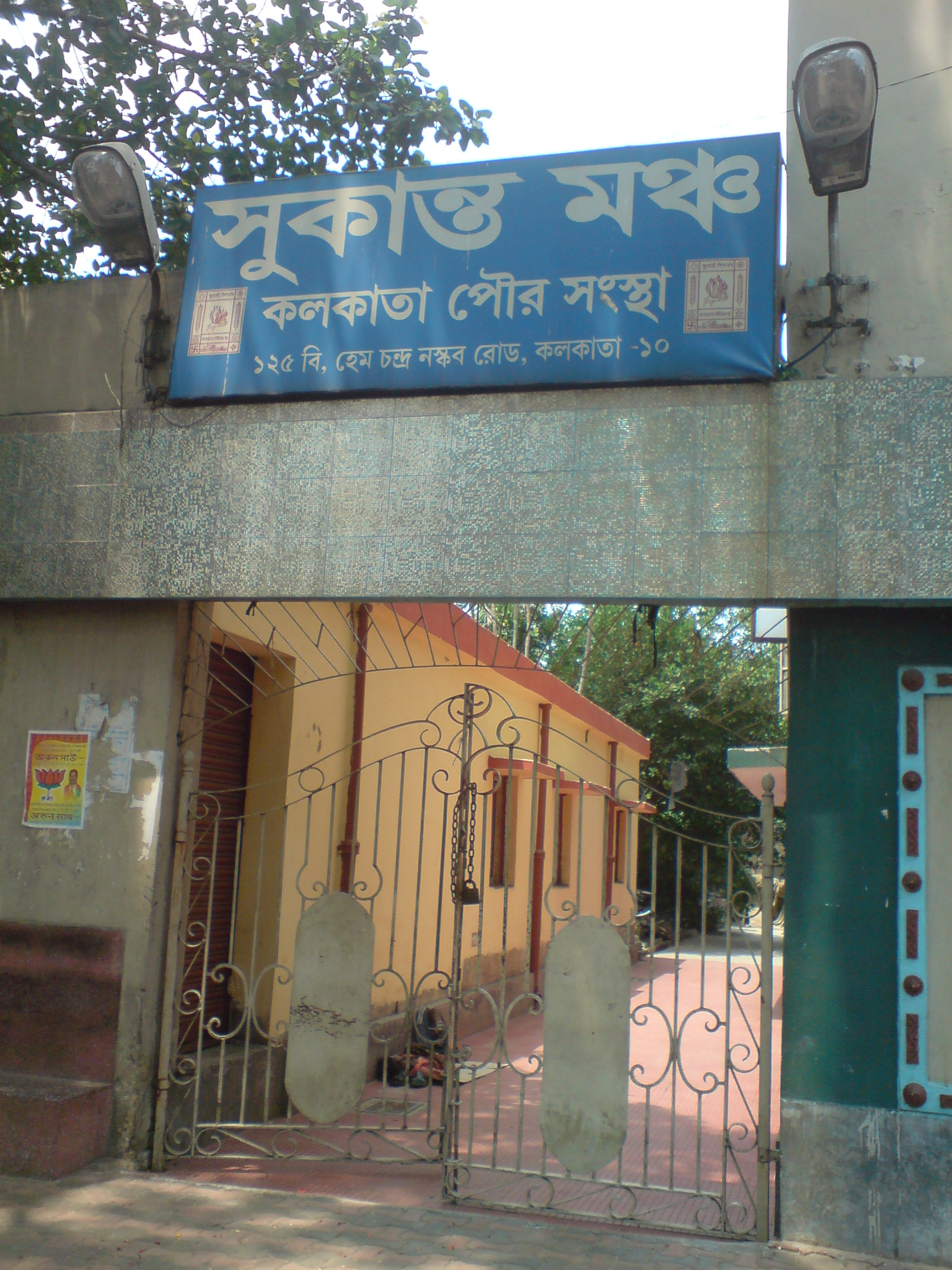
Sukanta Mancha

Named after the Bengali poet, Sukanta Bhattacharya, Sukanta Mancha is an auditorium in Kolkata, India. Cultural programmes are organized in the hall. It is located at CIT Road or Hem Chandra Naskar Road near Phulbagan Crossing.

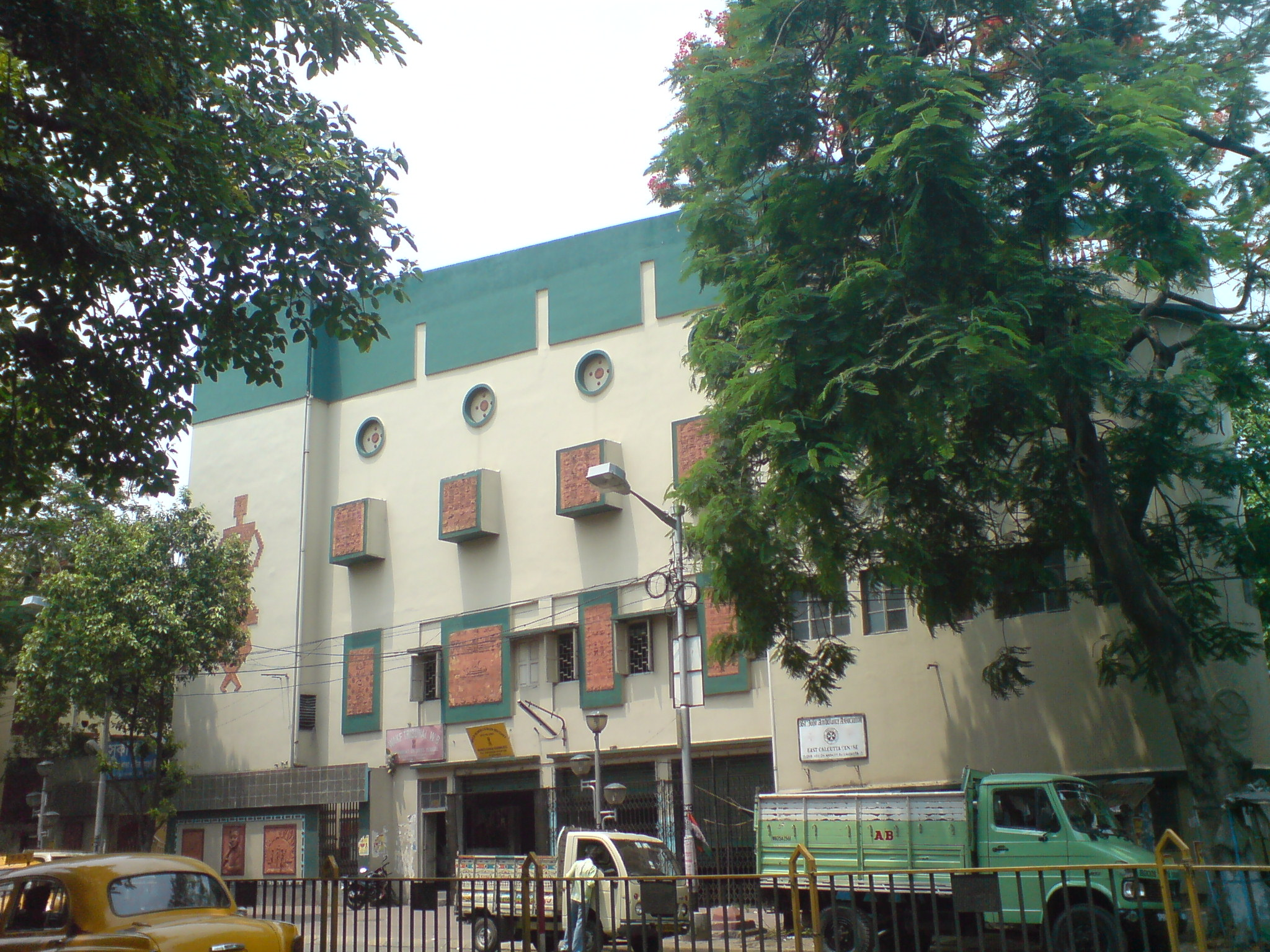
Sukanta Mancha
