= Photograph of Sukanta Bhattacharya =

1940s photograph of Sukanta Bhattacharya

- সুকান্ত ভট্টাচার্যের ছবি (Bengali)
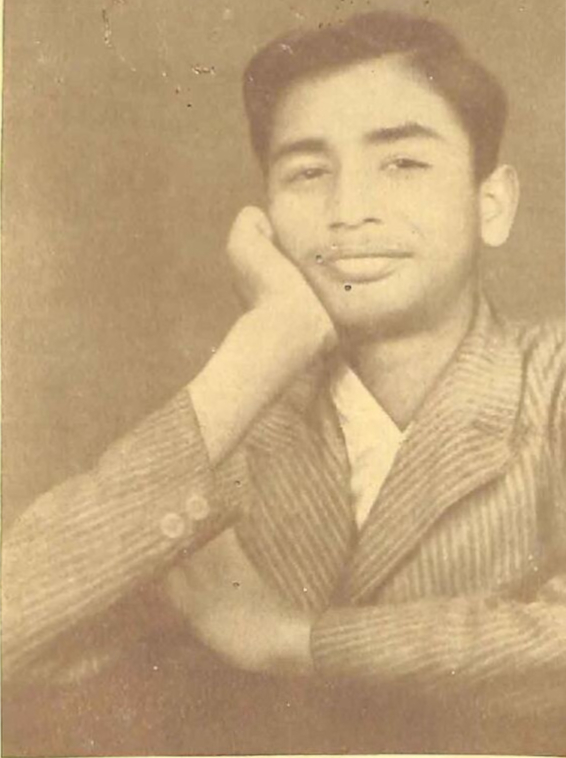
- Bhattacharya as depicted with his hand on his cheek
- Year: 1940s
- Type: Photograph
- Subject: Sukanta Bhattacharya

The photograph of Sukanta Bhattacharya as a teenager that depicts him resting his cheek on his hand's palm is believed to be the only authentic and confirmed photograph of Sukanta Bhattacharya. The photograph was taken in a photo studio.

There are different theories to how it was taken. Assumptions and statements have been made in Bhattacharya's biography books including the authors Jagannath Chakravorty and Ashok Bhattacharya, and by newspaper publications on him, including those by writers Sanghamitra Mazumdar and Priyanka Chowdhury. The origins are said to be before his sacred thread ceremony with his unshaven head; with the money his aunt gave him; and with the money he received on his birthday.

== Theories to how it was taken ==
According to Sukanta Bhattacharya's biographer Jagannath Chakravorty in his book titled Sukanta Bhattacharya, before the photograph was taken, as a background, Bhattacharya frequently went to the house of his friend Arunachal Basu. In there Basu's mother was highly affectionate to Bhattacharya, who was grateful to her. Chakravorty in course of the photo's origins writes, that before Bhattacharya went for his sacred thread ceremony where he would have to shave his head, he got himself photographed with his "unshaven bushy head". He writes that this photo is the most common photographic interpretation of the Bengali poet Sukanta Bhattacharya. In the photo, he appears with a smiling face with his cheek cupped on his hand's palm. Chakravorty further writes that this photo appears on many prints and other photographers with which readers are familiar with. He says that Bhattacharya "had a lovely profile" with his messy, disheveled and unkempt outfits he wore, and was photogenic.

According to Ashok Bhattacharya, most of Sukanta Bhattacharya's time was spent in the house of his brother Manomohan Bhattacharya, where his aunt also took care of him, and Sukanta generally avoided going to the house of his father where he initially stayed. He writes that before Bhattacharya went to become a celibate and participate in the sacred thread ceremony (Upanayana), his aunt gave him a one-rupee bill (note) to get something to eat. But his friend Bhupen advised him to take some photos with it. Bhattacharya agreeing to the advice, went to a photo studio to take some photographs of him. Ashok Bhattacharya writes that Sukanta took four passport-sized photos in the memory of preserving his hair, of which one was in which he was shown holding his cheek with his hand. After taking the photos, Bhattacharya focused on the radio.

According to the newspapers The Statesman (written by Sanghamitra Mazumdar) and The Daily Star (written by Priyanka Chowdhury), Bhattacharya was a "die-hard romantic by heart". The Statesman notes that a small incident that happened indicates his romanticism. Both the papers write that according to a narration by his contemporaries, an elder member from his family gave Bhattacharya a one-rupee bill (note) as a gift on one of his last birthdays. The papers remark that with this money, Bhattacharya went straight to a photo studio to get a photograph of himself taken. They comment that this is perhaps the only available and authentic image of Sukanta Bhattacharya. Later, Bhattacharya died on May 13, 1947, three months before India's partition.

== Cultural depiction ==
On January 15, 2018, actor Anirban Chakrabarti, known for playing the role of fictional detective Eken Babu, posted a picture of himself on Facebook with a striking resemblance to the picture of Sukanta Bhattacharya. The picture was in black and white, and was posted on the social media platform. In the post, Chakrabarti gave the caption: "This is my picture. No one would recognized me today compared to my current appearance if I did not tell. This was a story of the past– Doordarshan hosted a series, the director was Nitish Mukherjee. I played the role of Sukanta Bhattacharya in the episode named "Sukanta". I found the picture today!" Sangbad Pratidin and Prothom Alo described him to have a smile on his face in the picture and his right hand to be touching a part of his cheek and chin, with a head of hair, wearing a coat along with a shirt.
