= Bombing of Calcutta =

1942–1944 aerial raids by Japan on Calcutta

- Part of the Operation U-Go during the Burma Campaign in the South-East Asian theatre of World War II
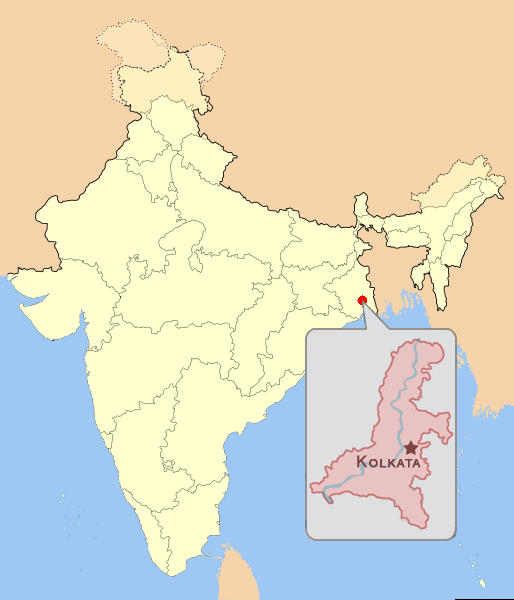
- Kolkata map
Date	20 December 1942 – mid-1944
Location	Calcutta 22°34′12″N 88°22′12″E
Result	Allied victory

Belligerents
British Empire: India; United States	Empire of Japan

Units involved
Royal Air Force; Royal Indian Air Force; United States Army Air Force	Imperial Japanese Army Air Force; Imperial Japanese Navy Air Service

Casualties and losses
Several Hundreds killed Several ships sunk Harbour significantly damaged	Several Mitsubishi Ki-21 and Mitsubishi Ki-46 destroyed One Aircraft carrier destroyed

The Bombing of Calcutta were a series of aerial raids carried out by the Imperial Japanese Army Air Force on Calcutta, the former capital of British India, during the Second World War. The bombing caused significant damages to infrastructure and killed hundreds, but failed to achieve their primary goal of disrupting Allied supply lines.

== Background ==
After the end of monsoon in 1942, the Imperial Japanese Army Air Force became more active, raiding northeastern Assam. The next targeted Calcutta, the former capital of British India and a significant port on the Bay of Bengal. Their objective was to destroy Calcutta port and delay Allied preparations for a counter-offensive. The 7th Air Brigade had been given the responsibility and they had carried out rehearsals in Malaya in November. In late November 1942 the brigade was reinforced by some aircraft of the Imperial Japanese Navy Air Service and, as reconnaissance showed a large concentration of shipping at Calcutta, the Japanese decided to raid the airfields in the Chittagong area at the end of the month to draw the Allied fighters away from Calcutta which was to be attacked on 5 December, but the attack was delayed till 20 December.

== Air raids ==
=== 1942 ===
On 20 December 1942, aircraft of the Imperial Japanese Army Air Force bombed Calcutta, causing damage to infrastructure and many casualties. The bombing campaign continued until 24 December. Raids on Christmas Eve mainly targeted Europeans but failed to cause significant damage or casualties. The Howrah Bridge was not damaged in the raids.

Calcutta's air defence systems forced the Japanese pilots to fly high and the raids occurred at night. The bombing mostly affected the industrial area and displaced 350,000 people. The United States Army Air Force was deployed in Calcutta to engage Japanese aircraft.

=== 1943 ===
The Royal Air Force (RAF) bomber squadrons responded to these raids by destroying many Japanese aircraft. By 1943, air defences were strengthened and Radar-guided night fighters began operations that destroyed several Japanese Mitsubishi Ki-21 and Mitsubishi Ki-46 fighters. In January 1943, Japanese raids were foiled by the RAF. In August 1943, the RAF used Spitfires for the first time.

On 5 December 1943, Japanese bombing of Calcutta's Kidderpore docks caused hundreds of deaths and destruction of several ships and warehouses. Japanese aircraft dropped high explosive and anti-personnel bombs on the docks during the day, not facing any resistance. The docks were devastated. RAF aircraft took off but they failed to engage the Japanese bombers.

=== 1944 ===
The Japanese Air Force continued to launch sporadic raids into 1944.

== Aftermath ==
In 1944, due to allied advances on multiple fronts, the Japanese aircraft had to be relocated to other areas for providing support, and thus, the bombing raids over Calcutta stopped. In 1945, with the Atomic bombings of Hiroshima and Nagasaki, the war came to an end.
