= List of Guggenheim Fellowships awarded in 2026 =

The following is a list of Guggenheim Fellowships awarded in 2026:

Fellow	Category	Field of Study
Joel Cabrita	Humanities	African Studies
Claire Wendland	Humanities	African Studies
Ed Pavlić	Humanities	American Literature
Anya Bernstein	Social Sciences	Anthropology & Cultural Studies
Angela Garcia	Social Sciences	Anthropology & Cultural Studies
Raven Garvey	Social Sciences	Anthropology & Cultural Studies
Ieva Jusionyte	Social Sciences	Anthropology & Cultural Studies
Tarek Elgindi	Natural Sciences	Applied Mathematics
Daniel Forger	Natural Sciences	Applied Mathematics
Neil Brenner	Humanities	Architecture, Planning, & Design
Scott Redford	Humanities	Architecture, Planning, & Design
Kate Merkel-Hess	Humanities	Asian Studies
Stephen Platt	Humanities	Asian Studies
Andrew Sartori	Humanities	Asian Studies
Erika Hamden	Natural Sciences	Astronomy–Astrophysics
Sang-Heon Dan Shim	Natural Sciences	Astronomy–Astrophysics
Kristen Iversen	Creative Arts	Biography
Regina Baucom	Natural Sciences	Biology
Rasmus Nielsen	Natural Sciences	Biology
Eric Richards	Natural Sciences	Biology
Bridgett vonHoldt	Natural Sciences	Biology
Randall H. Goldsmith	Natural Sciences	Chemistry
Heather Maynard	Natural Sciences	Chemistry
Kyle Abraham	Creative Arts	Choreography
Yanira Castro	Creative Arts	Choreography
Seán Curran	Creative Arts	Choreography
K.J. Holmes	Creative Arts	Choreography
Molly Rose Lieber	Creative Arts	Choreography
Amy O'Neal	Creative Arts	Choreography
Raymond Pinto	Creative Arts	Choreography
Silas Riener	Creative Arts	Choreography
Eleanor Smith	Creative Arts	Choreography
jaamil olawale kosoko	Creative Arts	Choreography
nia love	Creative Arts	Choreography
Michael Cosmopoulos	Humanities	Classics
Karen Stern	Humanities	Classics
Michael Kaplan	Natural Sciences	Climate Studies
Ilias Diakonikolas	Natural Sciences	Computer Science
Vinod Vaikuntanathan	Natural Sciences	Computer Science
Justin Driver	Social Sciences	Constitutional Studies
Gerard N. Magliocca	Social Sciences	Constitutional Studies
Yin Cao	Natural Sciences	Data Science
Matias D. Cattaneo	Natural Sciences	Data Science
Penny Arcade	Creative Arts	Drama & Performance Art
Stephanie Fleischmann	Creative Arts	Drama & Performance Art
Haruna Lee	Creative Arts	Drama & Performance Art
Ralph B. Peña	Creative Arts	Drama & Performance Art
Alva Rogers	Creative Arts	Drama & Performance Art
Elaine Romero	Creative Arts	Drama & Performance Art
P. David Polly	Natural Sciences	Earth Science
Alexandra Z. Worden	Natural Sciences	Earth Science
Ran Abramitzky	Social Sciences	Economics
Matthew Kraft	Social Sciences	Education
Haleh Ardebili	Natural Sciences	Engineering
Zubin Jacob	Natural Sciences	Engineering
Sheng Xu	Natural Sciences	Engineering
Nicole R. Rice	Humanities	English Literature
Andrew Stauffer	Humanities	English Literature
Marlene Daut	Humanities	European & Latin American History
Erik Linstrum	Humanities	European & Latin American History
Eric Zolov	Humanities	European & Latin American History
Mark Christian Thompson	Humanities	European & Latin American Literature
Andre Alexis	Creative Arts	Fiction
Jessica Anthony	Creative Arts	Fiction
Lucy Ives	Creative Arts	Fiction
Marlon James	Creative Arts	Fiction
Bret Anthony Johnston	Creative Arts	Fiction
Megha Majumdar	Creative Arts	Fiction
Anders Nilsen	Creative Arts	Fiction
Maurice Ruffin	Creative Arts	Fiction
Namwali Serpell	Creative Arts	Fiction
Madeleine Thien	Creative Arts	Fiction
Noah Isenberg	Creative Arts	Film, Video, & New Media Studies
Julie Turnock	Creative Arts	Film, Video, & New Media Studies
Margaret Brown	Creative Arts	Film-Video
Brian M. Cassidy	Creative Arts	Film-Video
Reid Davenport	Creative Arts	Film-Video
Cate Giordano	Creative Arts	Film-Video
Jacqueline Goss	Creative Arts	Film-Video
Christopher Harris	Creative Arts	Film-Video
Brian Christopher Hawkins	Creative Arts	Film-Video
Madeleine Hunt-Ehrlich	Creative Arts	Film-Video
Zhu Jia	Creative Arts	Film-Video
Sarah Lasley	Creative Arts	Film-Video
Steve Maing	Creative Arts	Film-Video
Mitch McCabe	Creative Arts	Film-Video
Tenzin Phuntsog	Creative Arts	Film-Video
Steve Reinke	Creative Arts	Film-Video
Anna Samo	Creative Arts	Film-Video
Beatriz Santiago Muñoz	Creative Arts	Film-Video
Melanie Shatzky	Creative Arts	Film-Video
Fern Silva	Creative Arts	Film-Video
Adam James Smith	Creative Arts	Film-Video
John Ahearn	Creative Arts	Fine Arts
American Artist	Creative Arts	Fine Arts
Fia Backström	Creative Arts	Fine Arts
Elena Bajo	Creative Arts	Fine Arts
Amy Bessone	Creative Arts	Fine Arts
Raymond Boisjoly	Creative Arts	Fine Arts
Sonya Clark	Creative Arts	Fine Arts
Kota Ezawa	Creative Arts	Fine Arts
Jude Griebel	Creative Arts	Fine Arts
Iva Gueorguieva	Creative Arts	Fine Arts
Karl Haendel	Creative Arts	Fine Arts
Fariba Hajamadi	Creative Arts	Fine Arts
Allison Janae Hamilton	Creative Arts	Fine Arts
LaMont Hamilton	Creative Arts	Fine Arts
James Hoff	Creative Arts	Fine Arts
Julia M. Kunin	Creative Arts	Fine Arts
Monica Majoli	Creative Arts	Fine Arts
Aspen Mays	Creative Arts	Fine Arts
Leeza Meksin	Creative Arts	Fine Arts
John Miller	Creative Arts	Fine Arts
Marina Rosenfeld	Creative Arts	Fine Arts
Michael Ross	Creative Arts	Fine Arts
Francis Ruyter	Creative Arts	Fine Arts
Kate Shepherd	Creative Arts	Fine Arts
Claire Sherman	Creative Arts	Fine Arts
Kenneth Tam	Creative Arts	Fine Arts
Alina Tenser	Creative Arts	Fine Arts
Juana Valdes	Creative Arts	Fine Arts
Jennifer West	Creative Arts	Fine Arts
Anne Wilson	Creative Arts	Fine Arts
Nathan Arrington	Humanities	Fine Arts Research
Claudia Brittenham	Humanities	Fine Arts Research
Elizabeth Mansfield	Humanities	Fine Arts Research
Emily Benedek	Creative Arts	General Nonfiction
William Deresiewicz	Creative Arts	General Nonfiction
Elisa Gabbert	Creative Arts	General Nonfiction
Amitav Ghosh	Creative Arts	General Nonfiction
Elizabeth Goodstein	Creative Arts	General Nonfiction
Donovan Hohn	Creative Arts	General Nonfiction
John J. Lennon	Creative Arts	General Nonfiction
Joseph Luzzi	Creative Arts	General Nonfiction
James Marcus	Creative Arts	General Nonfiction
Emily Ogden	Creative Arts	General Nonfiction
Pamela Petro	Creative Arts	General Nonfiction
Xuefei Ren	Natural Sciences	Geography & Environmental Studies
Afreen Siddiqi	Natural Sciences	Geography & Environmental Studies
Sera Young	Natural Sciences	Geography & Environmental Studies
Elena Conis	Humanities	History of Science, Technology, & Economics
Hannah Zeavin	Humanities	History of Science, Technology, & Economics
John Borrows	Humanities	Indigenous Studies
Faith Hillis	Humanities	Intellectual & Cultural History
Kris Manjapra	Humanities	Intellectual & Cultural History
Adam Mestyan	Humanities	Intellectual & Cultural History
Lawrence Douglas	Social Sciences	Law
Dov Fox	Social Sciences	Law
Richard Hasen	Social Sciences	Law
Christoph Irmscher	Humanities	Literary Criticism
Aaron Pollack	Natural Sciences	Mathematics
Alexander Ploss	Natural Sciences	Medicine & Health
Jamie Kreiner	Humanities	Medieval & Early Modern Studies
Rudolph Matthee	Humanities	Medieval & Early Modern Studies
Sarah McNamer	Humanities	Medieval & Early Modern Studies
Mathew Arrellín	Creative Arts	Music Composition
Sivan Cohen Elias	Creative Arts	Music Composition
Oswald Huỳnh	Creative Arts	Music Composition
Jon Irabagon	Creative Arts	Music Composition
Ingrid Laubrock	Creative Arts	Music Composition
James Brandon Lewis	Creative Arts	Music Composition
David Serkin Ludwig	Creative Arts	Music Composition
Modney	Creative Arts	Music Composition
Reinaldo Manuel Moya	Creative Arts	Music Composition
Linda May Han Oh	Creative Arts	Music Composition
Kay Kyurim Rhie	Creative Arts	Music Composition
Laurie Schwartz	Creative Arts	Music Composition
Marcelo Toledo	Creative Arts	Music Composition
Anya Yermakova	Creative Arts	Music Composition
W. Anthony Sheppard	Humanities	Music Research
Bedross Der Matossian	Humanities	Near Eastern Studies
Michael Yartsev	Natural Sciences	Neuroscience
Alan Baker	Humanities	Philosophy
Kate Manne	Humanities	Philosophy
Gina Schouten	Humanities	Philosophy
Samantha Appleton	Creative Arts	Photography
Jeremiah Ariaz	Creative Arts	Photography
Chris Aluka Berry	Creative Arts	Photography
Harlan Bozeman	Creative Arts	Photography
Jonathan Michael Castillo	Creative Arts	Photography
Stephen Ferry	Creative Arts	Photography
Allison Grant	Creative Arts	Photography
Kapulani Landgraf	Creative Arts	Photography
Matthew Leifheit	Creative Arts	Photography
Pixy Liao	Creative Arts	Photography
Chris McCaw	Creative Arts	Photography
Fred Ritchin	Creative Arts	Photography
Collier Schorr	Creative Arts	Photography
Lara Shipley	Creative Arts	Photography
Sheida Soleimani	Creative Arts	Photography
riel Sturchio	Creative Arts	Photography
Sadie Wechsler	Creative Arts	Photography
Guanyu Xu	Creative Arts	Photography
Samira Yamin	Creative Arts	Photography
Andrea Damascelli	Natural Sciences	Physics
David Kosower	Natural Sciences	Physics
Raymond Antrobus	Creative Arts	Poetry
Paula Bohince	Creative Arts	Poetry
Heather Christle	Creative Arts	Poetry
Myronn Hardy	Creative Arts	Poetry
Christopher Kempf	Creative Arts	Poetry
Suji Kwock Kim	Creative Arts	Poetry
Edgar Kunz	Creative Arts	Poetry
Rickey Laurentiis	Creative Arts	Poetry
Vivek Narayanan	Creative Arts	Poetry
V. Penelope Pelizzon	Creative Arts	Poetry
Don Moynihan	Social Sciences	Political Science
Kathleen Thelen	Social Sciences	Political Science
Daniel Ziblatt	Social Sciences	Political Science
Mina Cikara	Social Sciences	Psychology
Kristina Reiss Olson	Social Sciences	Psychology
Edward E. Curtis IV	Humanities	Religion
Georg B. Michels	Humanities	Slavic Studies
Damon Centola	Social Sciences	Sociology
Allison Pugh	Social Sciences	Sociology
Robb Willer	Social Sciences	Sociology
Sean Metzger	Humanities	Theatre Arts & Performance Studies
Harvey Young	Humanities	Theatre Arts & Performance Studies
Heather Cleary	Humanities	Translation
Christian W. McMillen	Humanities	U.S. History
Natalia Molina	Humanities	U.S. History
Sharon Ann Murphy	Humanities	U.S. History
John Wood Sweet	Humanities	U.S. History
