= List of museums in South Yorkshire =

Museums in South Yorkshire, England

This list of museums in South Yorkshire, England contains museums which are defined for this context as institutions (including nonprofit organizations, government entities, and private businesses) that collect and care for objects of cultural, artistic, scientific, or historical interest and make their collections or related exhibits available for public viewing. Also included are non-profit art galleries and university art galleries. Museums that exist only in cyberspace (i.e., virtual museums) are not included.

Name	Image	Town/City	Region	Type	Notes
Abbeydale Industrial Hamlet		Sheffield	Sheffield	Industry	Historic steel and iron-working site with living history enactors
Alfred Denny Museum		Sheffield	Sheffield	Natural history	biology specimens, part of the University of Sheffield, open monthly for guided tours only
Bank Street Arts		Sheffield	Sheffield	Art	Contemporary arts centre
Bishops' House		Sheffield	Sheffield	Historic house	Early 16th century half-timbered house, exhibitions on life in the 16th and 17th centuries with two rooms decorated in Jacobean style
Brodsworth Hall		Brodsworth	Doncaster	Historic house	Operated by English Heritage, Victorian country house, features late 19th to late 20th century interiors, 1860s gardens
Cannon Hall Museum, Park & Gardens		Cawthorne	Barnsley	Multiple	17th-century country house, includes collections of fine furniture, paintings, ceramics and glassware, houses the Regimental Museum of the 13th/18th Royal Hussars (Queen Mary's Own) and the Light Dragoons
Cawthorne Victoria Jubilee Museum		Cawthorne	Barnsley	Local	information, local history, culture, agriculture
The Civic, Barnsley		Barnsley	Barnsley	Art	performing arts centre with art gallery
Clifton Park and Museum		Rotherham	Rotherham	Multiple	Local history, archaeology, Victorian period kitchen, toys, Rockingham Pottery, antiquities, natural and social history, York and Lancaster Regiment artefacts and memorabilia
Conisbrough Castle		Doncaster	Doncaster	Historic house	Operated by English Heritage, restored medieval castle keep and medieval life exhibits
Cooper Gallery		Barnsley	Barnsley	Art	contemporary art exhibits, collection of 17th- to 20th-century paintings, watercolours and drawings
Cusworth Hall		Cusworth	Doncaster	Historic house	Restored 18th-century country house with local history exhibits
Doncaster Museum & Art Gallery		Doncaster	Doncaster	Multiple	Natural history, archaeology, local history, fine and decorative art, pottery in Yorkshire
Elsecar Heritage Centre		Elsecar	Barnsley	Industry	Early industrial and mining village, exhibits on local history and industry and a Newcomen beam engine, buildings house an antiques centre, craft shops, Elsecar Heritage Railway
Experience Barnsley		Barnsley	Barnsley	Local	Local social history and archaeology, archives centre and changing exhibitions
Graves Art Gallery		Sheffield	Sheffield	Art	Collections of 19th- and 20th-century British and European art
Kelham Island Museum		Sheffield	Sheffield	Industry	Local industries including steelmaking, steam engines, Sheffield-made vehicles of the 1920s
Kings Own Yorkshire Light Infantry Museum		Doncaster	Doncaster	Military	History and memorabilia of the Kings Own Yorkshire Light Infantry, located in the same building as Doncaster Museum and Art Gallery
Magna Science Adventure Centre		Templeborough	Rotherham	Science	Located in a former steelworks, hands-on exhibits about earth, air, fire, water, power, steel-making
Maurice Dobson Museum		Darfield	Barnsley	Local	local history
Millennium Gallery		Sheffield	Sheffield	Art	Exhibits of historic and contemporary art and crafts
National Emergency Services Museum		Sheffield	Sheffield	Multiple	Historic fire and police station with equipment, vehicles, uniforms, artifacts, local history displays
National Videogame Museum		Sheffield	Sheffield	Technology	A unique museum where you can play, explore and create videogames. Moved from Nottingham in December 2018, and was renamed from the National Videogame Arcade to the National Videogame Museum.
Rotherham Art Gallery		Rotherham	Rotherham	Art	
S1 Artspace		Sheffield	Sheffield	Art	Artist-led organisation with programmes of contemporary exhibitions, commissions, screenings and events
Sheffield Institute of Arts Gallery		Sheffield	Sheffield	Art	Part of Sheffield Hallam University, changing exhibits of art and design
Shepherd Wheel		Sheffield	Sheffield	Technology	Former water-powered grinding workshop with water wheel, grinding hulls and grinding wheels
Site Gallery		Sheffield	Sheffield	Art	Changing exhibits of multimedia-based art
South Yorkshire Aircraft Museum		Doncaster	Doncaster	Aerospace	Occupies the former site of RAF Doncaster, restored and historic aeroplanes
South Yorkshire Transport Museum		Aldwarke	Rotherham	Transportation	Formerly the Sheffield Bus Museum, history of bus transport in South Yorkshire
Turner Museum of Glass		Sheffield	Sheffield	Art	Part of the University of Sheffield, 19th and 20th century glass
Wentworth Castle		Stainborough	Barnsley	Historic house	Early 18th-century castle under restoration, gardens
Weston Park Museum		Sheffield	Sheffield	Multiple	Art, natural history, archaeology, decorative arts, social history, ethnographic and Inuit artifacts
Worsbrough Mill Museum and Country Park		Worsbrough	Barnsley	Mill	Features a 17th-century water-powered mill and a 19th-century steam-powered mill
Wortley Top Forge		Wortley	Barnsley	Industry	Historic former ironworks and water-powered forge
Yorkshire ArtSpace		Sheffield	Sheffield	Art	Contemporary art exhibits
Yorkshire Natural History Museum		Sheffield	Sheffield	Natural History	
Yorkshire Sculpture Park		West Bretton	Wakefield	Art	Open-air gallery on the border of South and West Yorkshire

== Defunct museums ==
- National Centre for Popular Music, Sheffield, closed in 2000
- York & Lancaster Regiment Museum, Rotherham, closed in 2011, collections now part of the Clifton Park Museum

== See also ==
- Category:Tourist attractions in South Yorkshire
