= Roanna Wells =

English artist

Roanna Wells (born 1987) is a fine artist based in Sheffield, UK. Wells makes process based work in embroidery and watercolour.

== Early life and education ==
Wells was born and grew up in Sheffield, she studied a BA (Hons) Embroidery at Manchester School of Art, Manchester Metropolitan University, 2006–2009.

== Career ==
Wells is currently a studio holder at Yorkshire Artspace, Exchange Place Studios

Between 2011 and 2015 Wells made her series of stitched work entitled 'Interpersonal Spatial Arrangements’. These abstract conceptual works used traditional embroidery stitches, concentrating on the seed stitch, to translate aerial images of large crowds of people, only visualizing each human element of the scene through each stitch. The work explores, through repetitive mark-making, "mass groupings, collective presence, the act of representing statistics, and the time and process taken to record these". Initially drawn to look at swarms occurring in the natural world through the aesthetic of her early detailed embroidery work, Wells went on to take inspiration from aerial photographs of crowds of people at political, cultural or sporting events, including the Obama inauguration ceremony. In 2013 Wells was awarded the Jerwood Makers Open commission, which enabled her to travel to India for the Kumbh Mela Hindu festival and commission aerial photographs of this to work from. Wells' resulting work through Jerwood Open toured to three venues across the UK in 2013, showing alongside other recipients of the award.

Wells moved from making monochrome embroidered works to transferring her meditative repetitive mark making to watercolour as well. In going from her stitched work to experimenting with watercolour she also introduced colour into her work. Her colour palette is usually made up of subdued neutral colours inspired by the natural world, greens, bues, browns and greys. She has worked on numerous projects using watercolours, involving meticulous patterns made up of repetitive brush marks on paper. Wells is interested in the labour-intensive making process, her own instinctive neat and ordered mark making, and the way each single brush mark represents a single moment in time and shows the varying ways the colour changes in each application. The act of expression through repetitive mark making is important for Wells.

In the 2017 exhibition 'Tracing Process' in Sheffield visitors and members of the community were invited to add their own marks to Well's ordered lines of watercolour brush marks. the show investigated how members of the public chose to add their marks to the work, and the combination of these with Wells own precise marks.

The 2014 work 'Desert Island Discs : 45 minutes : 136 episodes' explored the durational aspect of Wells' making process. This made the making process public as Wells made the work- applying watercolour marks - in the gallery space whilst it was open to the public, and tied the application of paint to the duration of episodes of Radio 4 show Desert Island Discs, spanning all 136 episodes.

== Selected projects and exhibitions ==
- Harley Open Exhibition, The Harley Gallery, Welbeck, 2020
- Construction House, S1 Artspace, Sheffield, 2018
- Tracing Process, Yorkshire Artspace, Sheffield, 2017
- Three Act Structure, S1 Artspace, Sheffield, 2014
- John Ruskin Prize for Drawing, Millennium Gallery, Sheffield, 2014
- Above : within, Millennium Gallery, Sheffield, 2014
- Jerwood Makers Open 2013, Jerwood Space, London, Pier Arts Centre, Orkney & Ruthin Craft Centre, Wales
- Jerwood Drawing Prize 2011, Jerwood Space, London, 2011
- S1 Members Show, S1 Artspace, Sheffield, 2011

== Awards ==
- Jerwood Makers Open 2013 commission
- Best of the Best Winner, Art in Action, 2009
