= Matilda Centre =

Community centre in Sheffield, England

Coordinates: 53.3754°N 1.4680°W

The Matilda Centre was a self-managed, grassroots social and community centre based at 111 Matilda Street in Sheffield, South Yorkshire, England. The centre took the name of the street on which the building can still be found. It was housed in the derelict Sydney Works building and collectives ran a variety of projects, including a café, free shop and concert venue. It was evicted in June 2006.

== Occupation ==
In June 2005, Sheffield hosted a meeting of the G8 Justice and Home Affair Ministers. The Sydney Works building at 111 Matilda Street building was squatted as a convergence space for the protests against the meeting. The former industrial had previously been converted by Yorkshire ArtSpace into studios. It then became a self-managed social centre. The anarchist collectives which ran the centre worked to promote various creative activities in the centre, including a free shop, live music and art, political activities and open source software projects. They ran a café and also worked to maintain the building.

In June 2006, regional development company Yorkshire Forward, which owned the building, initiated a possession claim against the squatters. Yorkshire Forward was granted possession and the squatters left the building, saying "we are more concerned about being creative than getting into an argument with them".
