= The Pastoral Clinic =

2010 book by Angela Garcia

The Pastoral Clinic: Addiction and Dispossession Along The Rio Grande
- Author: Angela Garcia
- Publisher: University of California Press
- Publication date: June 2010
- Pages: 264
- ISBN: 978-0-520262-08-9
- OCLC: 503594617

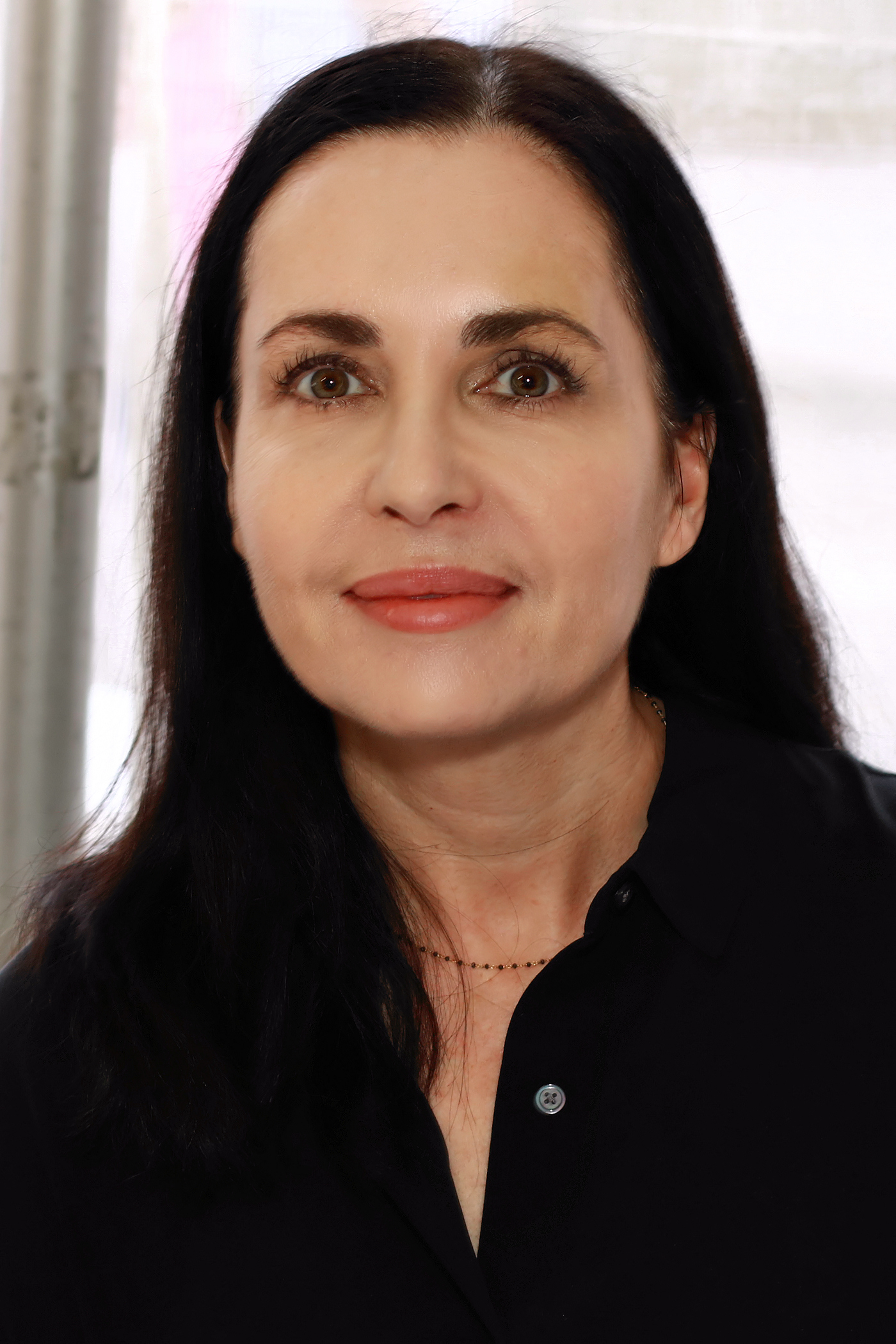
Angela Garcia

The Pastoral Clinic: Addiction and Dispossession Along The Rio Grande is a non-fiction book by anthropologist Angela Garcia. It was published in 2010 by University of California Press. The book is about heroin use in New Mexico and anexos, illegal addiction centers in common in Mexico. It focuses on Garcia's work in a detox center, Nueva Día, in Española, using stories and case studies that Garcia gathered. The book was originally started as Garcia's dissertation.

== Reception ==
In a Social Forces review, Paul Draus said that the book "provides a painful, multilayered ethnographic portrait of the people who inhabit the valley villages", calling it "compelling". He praised the book for its discussion on the impact of colonialism in New Mexico, and for Garcia's open-ended analysis and the fact that she did not attempt to provide solutions to the heroin epidemic in the area. Gilbert Quintero, in a Current Anthropology review, also praised Garcia for the connections she drew between the area's history and its current state. However, Quintero also lamented what he felt were "missed opportunities" for Garcia to explain her behaviour and the ethics of working with patients while also gathering data from them to use in her book, and for its lack of reflection. He concluded that the book lay on " the boundary that demarcates a pornography of loss, suffering, and hopelessness", and said her retellings of people's stories were possibly "too intimate" to be appropriate. An American Ethnologist review, written by Donna Goldstein, did not share the same concerns. Goldstein described the book as a "haunting ethnography of heroin addiction" that shared individual stories "miraculously without pathologizing them". Goldstein used the book with her students.
