= Jennifer West =

American artist (born 1966)

- Born: 1966 (age 59–60); Topanga, California, U.S.
- Education: Art Center College of Design, Evergreen State College
- Occupation: artist

Jennifer West (born 1966) is an American artist. She is known for her digitized films that are made by hand manipulating film celluloid. She serves as faculty at the University of Southern California (USC) at the Roski School of Art and Design. She lives and works in Los Angeles.

Wendy Vogel writes for Artforum.com, "Like her experimental predecessors, West forgoes narrative cohesion in favor of creating jumpy cuts and abstract visual collages––splicing, rolling, and drenching the celluloid using materials from Mylar tape to pickle juice, whiskey to candle smoke." Christopher Bedford wrote in Artforum on her work, "sexy, whimsical, painting-scale DVD projections walk that elusive line between pictorial modes with deftness, wit, and airy originality." Joanna Kleinberg wrote on her work in Frieze "the intermingling of materiality, feeling and identity creates a wild blend of synaesthetic experience wherein the substances of life literally and figuratively colour the film."

== Biography ==
Jennifer West was born in 1966 in Topanga, California.

She received her BA degree from the Evergreen State College in Olympia, Washington with an emphasis in film and video. She later obtained her MFA degree from Art Center College of Design (Pasadena, California) in 2004, where studied with Jeremy Gilbert-Rolfe, Mike Kelley, and Diana Thater. She serves as faculty at the University of Southern California (USC) at the Roski School of Art and Design. She is a 2026 Guggenheim Fellow and a 2025-26 Smithsonian Artist Research Fellow.

== Work ==
West makes 16mm, 35mm and 70mm films by manipulating the film celluloid to a level of performance. The film emulsion might be doused with perfume, Jack Daniels or pepper spray, skateboarded on or dragged through tar pits. West is also known for the Zine booklets that she produces featuring the production stills showing the making of the films. The destroyed and distressed films are then digitized and shown as looping video projections in museums and art galleries.

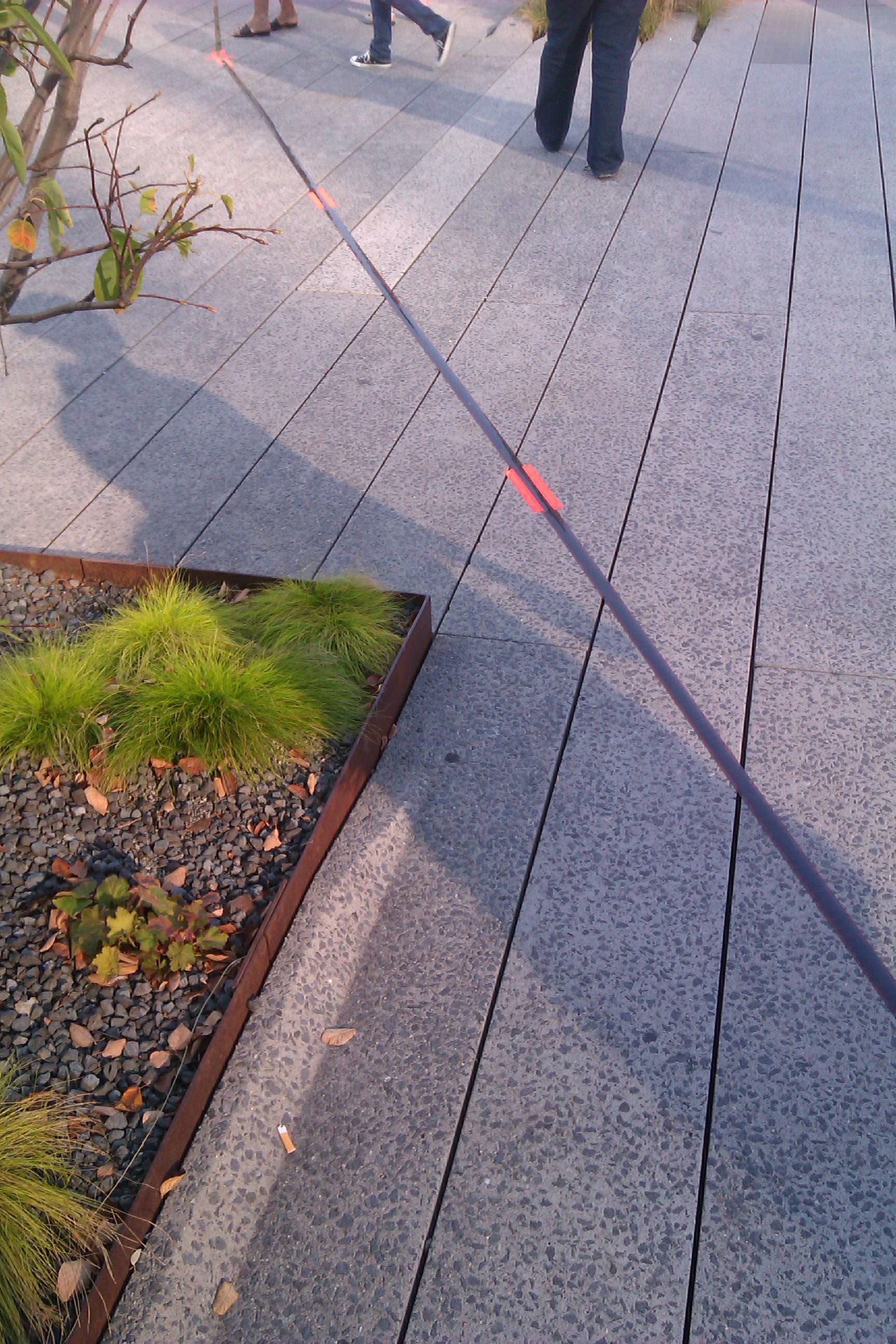
A piece of the filmstrip for One Mile Parkour Film on the pathway of the High Line

She is best known for the live performance, "Skate the Sky" (2009), staged at the Tate Modern in London where she invited skateboarders to skate over filmstrips taped to the floor of the Turbine Hall. Other significant commissions include, "One Mile Film" (for High Line Art, New York) where the artist taped a mile-long filmstrip to the length of the High Line walk-way in New York City for one-day allowing the visitors to leave their mark on the film by writing messages, drawing, and walking on the filmstrip. The damaged 58 minute, 40 second film was digitized to high-definition and shown as a digital projection onto the side of a building on the High Line. She has also made commissioned projects for Institute of Contemporary Arts London's Art Night (2016) Aspen Art Museum (2010) and as an Artist in Residence at EMPAC at RPI in Troy, NY and at MIT List Visual Arts Center (2011).

== Exhibitions ==
=== Solo exhibitions ===
- Painted Cat Hacker Film, Midnight Moment, Times Square Arts, New York, NY (2021)
- Experiments with Holofans and Film is Dead..., Stefan Lundgren Gallery, Mallorca, Spain (2021)
- Future Forgetting, JOAN, Los Angeles, CA (2020)
- Is Film Over?, Yuz Museum Shanghai, Shanghai, China (2017)
- Action Movies, Painted Films and History Collage, Man Museum, Nouro, Sardinia, Italy (2017)
- Film is Dead..., Seattle Art Museum, Seattle, Washington (2016)
- Flashlight Filmstrip Projections, Tramway, Glasgow, Scotland (2016)
- One Mile Film, Lisa Cooley Gallery, New York, NY (2015)
- Spirals, Salt and The Pill, Marc Foxx Gallery, Los Angeles, CA (2013)
- Selected Films by Jennifer West, High Line Art, New York, New York (2012)
- Aloe Vera and Butter, S1 Artspace, Sheffield, England (2012)
- Heavy Metals: Iron and Zinc, Vilma Gold, London (2011–12)
- Perspectives 171: Jennifer West, Contemporary Art Museum, Houston (2010)
- Western Bridge, Seattle, Washington (2010)
- Paintballs and Pickle Juice, Kunstverein Nuremberg (2010)
- Pomegranate Juice & Pepper Spray, Marc Foxx Gallery, Los Angeles, California (2009)
- Electric Kool-Aid and the Mezkal Worm, Vilma Gold, London, UK(2008)
- Lemon Juice and Lithium, Transmission Gallery, Glasgow, Scotland (2008)
- Occamy, Marc Foxx Gallery, Los Angeles, California (2007)
- White Columns, New York, New York (2007)

== Projects and commissions ==
- Tramway, Glasgow, Scotland (2016)
- Art Night London, Presented by the ICA London (2016)
- TBA Festival, Portland Institute for Contemporary Art, Portland, Oregon (2014)
- High Line Art, High Line, City of New York Parks and Recreation (2012)
- 5th Biennial of the Moving Image, Mechelen, Belgium (2011)
- MIT List Visual Arts Center Artist in Residence Program, Cambridge, Massachusetts (2011)
- Aspen Art Museum, Aspen, Colorado (2010)
- Tate Modern, Tate, London (2009)

=== Immersive installations ===
- Golden Corrosion, CAPITAL Gallery, San Francisco, CA (2018)
- Flashlight Filmstrip Projections, 2014/2016
- Film is dead..., 2016

== Filmography ==
- Marinated Film – the roll of 16mm I had in the fridge for over ten years (16mm film negative marinated for several months in: Absinthe & XTC, Pepsi & Poprocks, Jim Shaw's Urine, Red Wine, Coffee & Detox Tea, Aphrodisiacs), 2005
- Double Fast Luck Film (16mm film leader sprinkled with Red Luck Oil, Green Luck Perfume, soaked in mint, cinnamon and vanilla), 2006
- Attraction Film (16mm film leader dripped words with maple syrup, soaked in red onion, red apple & red carnations), 2006
- Hot, Spicy, Tingle Film (16mm film leader soaked for 3 months in: Ben Gay & Tiger's balm, salsa, 100 garlic cloves, crest striped toothpaste, red hots, hot tamales & altos, mouthwash), 2006
- Comfort Food Film ("unprocessed" 16mm film negative cooked in mashed potatoes & gravy, macaroni & cheese, guacamole, ketchup, mustard & pickle relish, hot oatmeal, applesauce and spaghetti & meatballs), 2006
- Yeah Film (16mm film leader soaked in clover, belladonna and poppie tea, inscribed with the word yeah written in beet juice and Pepto-Bismol), 2006
- Tar Smell Film (16mm film negative exposed with cigarette light, dragged along beach sand tar, rubbed with skin so soft lotion and dripped with manic panic hair dyes – based on perfume notes for Tar Scent by Comme des Garcon), 2006
- Tar Pits Film (16mm film negative thrown in the La Brea Tar Pits, ridden over hot tarmac by a motorcycle, soaked in kitty litter, lighter fluid, mayonnaise and body lotion) 2006
- Paintball Film (16mm film leader "shot" with paintballs by me, Finn West and a bunch of 12 yr old boys), 2006
- Psychosomatic Films #1 -5, 2006
- Dirty Film (16mm film leader buried in dirt from my yard, the street and Elysian nudist colony, given mud bath and red hot lava mask), 2006
- Odor Film 53 (16mm film negative dripped with nailpolish, burnt Rubber, xerox light, skimboarded over – based on notes from Comme des Garcon Odor 53), 2006
- Odor Film 71 (16mm film negative soaked in lettuce juice, submerged in LA river, static electricity, dust on a hot light bulb – based on notes from Comme des Garcon Odeur 71), 2006
- Odor Film 2 (16mm film negative soaked in horse manure, ink, patchouli incense, cumin -based on Odeur 2 notes), 2006
- Naked Deep Creek Hot Springs Film (16mm film negative soaked in lithium hot springs water, Jack Daniels and pot – exposed with flashlights – skinnydipping by Karen Liebowitz, Benjamon Britton & Jwest), 2007
- Whatever Film (16mm film leader soaked in lots of coffee, espresso & turmeric, taken on power walk, rubbed with sweat and inscribed with the word, "whatever" written in purple metallic eyeliner), 2007
- Nirvana Alchemy Film (16mm black & white film soaked in lithium mineral hot springs, pennyroyal tea, doused in mud, sopped in bleach, cherry antacid and laxatives – jumping by Finn West & Jwest), 2007
- Popped Cherry Film (16mm film leader stained with cherry juice, popped with hole puncher), 2007
- My Milk Is Your Shit/Nirvana Alchemy Film 2 (35mm movie film frozen in breast milk from the freezer and hand processed), 2007
- Led Zeppelin Alchemy Film (16mm film dripped with lemon juice, honey, wine, hit with a custard pie, tangerines, flowers and cucumber – featuring strobe light hair performances by Jill Spector & Jwest), 2007
- Regressive Squirty Sauce Film (16mm film leader squirted and dripped with chocolate sauce, ketchup, mayonnaise & apple juice), 2007
- Organic Biodynamic Natural Food Film (16mm film neg cooked in organic tofu dogs, hemp milk, beets, fried in cage-free, vegetarian-fed eggs, canned chili, peanut butter sandwich & steak sauce – hand processed in bathtub), 2007
- A 70MM Film Wearing Thick Heavy Black Liquid Eyeliner That Gets Smeary (70MM film leader lined with liquid black eyeliner, doused with Jell-O Vodka shots and rubbed with body glitter), 2008
- Rainbow Party on 70MM Film (70MM film leader kissed with lipstick & impressed with teeth marks by Jwest and her former students: Mariah Csepanyi, Maggie Romano & Roxana Eslemiah), 2008
- Skinnydipping Carbon Beach Malibu Film – In Front of David Geffen's House (16mm color and b&w film neg sprayed with fried pickle juice, painted with Bloody Mary's using, celery stalks & ash from the Malibu fires, submerged in the ocean – skinny-dipping by Renee Lotenero, Lia Trinka-Browner, Karen Liebowitz& Jwest – lit by the full moon & search lights), 2008
- Riot Grrrl Alchemy Film (16mm b&w and color film neg danced on with sneakers, sprayed with cherry tomatoes, rubbed with cinnamon butter buns, strawberries and candy bars – based on lyrics from Sleater Kinney, Bikini Kill and Le Tigre – food fight on the table performances by Ariel West & Jwest, shot on Super Bowl Sunday by Peter West who was kind of drunk), 2008
- Roadtrip Between LA and Seattle Film (16mm color negative, positive and b&w negative scratched with tumbleweed, tire treads, pine needles, sprinkled with BlackJax extreme energizers pills, coffee, donuts, hot cheetos & doused with gasoline & gatorade), 2008
- Idyllwild Campfire Smell Film (16mm film neg lit by the campfire and treated with bug spray, white gas, gin, sweat, smoke, pitch, marshmallow, beer, wine, pit toilet, dirt, sap, tent & sleeping bag – featuring marshmallow roasting by a bunch of friends), 2008
- Daisies Roll Up Film (16mm color and b&w film neg rolled with hard boiled eggs, oranges, lemons, avocados, pickles, green apples, milk and watermelon – a remake of a scene from Vera Chytilova's 1966 film, Daisies – rolling off the bed performances by: Mariah Csepanyi, Finn West & Jwest, lit with black light & strobe light), 2008
- Daisies Cut Up Film (16mm color and b&w film neg licked with orange & lemon juice, sprayed with pickle juice, rubbed with daisies and California poppies – cut up and pieced back together – a remake of a scene from Vera Chytilova's 1966 film, Daisies – scissor and image eating performances by: Mariah Csepanyi & Jwest, lit with black light & strobe light),2008
- Malia the Babysitter Guitar Hero Film (16mm film neg rubbed with fruit loops sugar cereal, pizza and soda – guitar hero video game performances by Malia James, Finn & Ariel West and Colette Weber Shaw), 2008
- I'm a (Beautiful) Stain/Nirvana Alchemy Film 3 (35mm film leader stained with Teen Spirit deodorant & glue – jumped on, skateboarded over, dove on, smashed & crushed – collaged back together with splicing tape – film crushed and smashed by Finn West, Keenan Bloughand Val Koziak), 2008
- Electric Kool-Aid Fountain Swimming Film (35MM movie negative submerged in LA's Mulholland Fountain, dripped with Kool-aid and liquid LSD – featuring nighttime fountain swimming by Mateo Tannatt, Lia Trinka-Browner, Lesley Moon, Mariah Csepanyi and Jwest), 2008
- Green M&M's & Mezcal Worm Film (70MM film leader with a mezcal worm dragged over the surface – imprinted with hundreds of green M & M's), 2008
- Seriously Film (70MM Film Leader soaked in MSG and boiling water – inscribed & stamped with the word seriously – with Viagra, Visine and Fake tanning lotion), 2008
- Skate the Sky Film (35mm film print of clouds in the sky covered with ink, Ho-Ho's, and Melon juice – filmstrips taped to Tate Turbine Hall ramp and skateboarded over using ollie, kick flip, pop shove-it, acid drop, melon grab, crooked grind, bunny hop, tic tacs, sex change, disco flip – skateboarding performed live for Long Weekend by Thomas Lock, Louis Henderson, Charlotte Brennan, Dion Penman, Sam Griffin, Jak Tonge, Evin Goode and Quantin Paris, clouds shot by Peter West), 2009
- Lavender Mist Film/Pollock Film 1 (70mm film leader rubbed with Jimson Weed Trumpet flowers, spraypainted, dripped and splattered with nail polish, sprayed with lavender mist air freshener), 2009
- Goodbye Green River Killer Film (70mm film leader soaked in the Green River, mud, blackberries, ferns, flowers – smudged with the smell of burning sage), 2009
- Hollywood Sign Film – for Peg Entwistle (35MM interpositive dripped with holly berry juice, painted with pepper spray & silver dust using a great horned owl feather – illegally climbing on the Hollywood Sign performances by Shamim Momin, Mariah Csepanyi and Jwest, lit by headlamps, flashlights and police search lights), 2009
- Vampire Obsession Film (70MM film leader painted with pomegranate juice, bit with vampire teeth, sprinkled with reflective mica flakes, dragged through the misty Olympic Rainforest woods, 16MM film taped to the surface – girls in movie theater watching Twilight performed by Jessica Tetu and Sara Van Oostrum, 70MM film bitten by Keenan Blough, Val Koziak and Finn West), 2009
- Shoes on the Telephone Wire Axe Body Spray Patchouli Film (70MM film leader sprayed with Axe Body Spray Cologne and dripped with Patchouli Oil – 16MM film taped to surface – featuring shoe throwing onto telephone wire performances by Stephen Rhodes and Jwest – shot by Peter West – lit with flashlights by Mariah Csepanyi), 2009
- Smoke, Darts and Mirrors Film (35mm film leader painted with candle smoke, taped to a dart board and hit with darts dipped in habanero sauce, taped with mirrored and opalescent mylar – throwing darts performed by Lucrecia Roa, Mateo Tannatt, Lesley Moon, Jen Collins, Patrick Cates, Mariah Csepanyi, Blake Bailey and Jwest), 2010
- Shred the Gnar Full Moon Film Noir (35mm film print and negative shredded and stomped on by a bunch of snowboarders and a few skiers – marked up with blue course dye – sprayed with Diet Coke, Bud Lite & Whiskey – taken hot tubbing with Epsom salts, rubbed with Arnica, K-Y Jelly, butter and Advil – full moon shot by Peter West), 2010
- Topanga Beach Houses Imminent Domain Rewind Film (16mm film print rubbed with aloe vera gel, smeared with sexwax surfboard wax, butter, grass, hole punched – still photos of the Topanga Beach community in the 1960s and 70s before the houses were bulldozed and burned with the eminent domain law – movie stills from "Muscle Beach" and "Cosmic Children" – found photographs from the Int'l Surfing Magazine (Jim Fitzpatrick), Malibu Times (Gary Graham), Marlies Armand, Jeff Ort, Woody Stuart and John Clemmens), 2010
- I ♥ Neutrinos: You Cant See Them but They are Everywhere (70mm Film Frames of Neutrino Movements – shot in 15 ft Bubble Chamber at Fermilab, Experiment 564 near Chicago – dunked in liquid nitrogen, neutrino movements events with invisible ink and decoder markers and highlighters, inked up by Monica Kogler and Jwest, filmstrip from Janet Conrad, MIT Professor of Physics), 2011
- Neutrino, Gamma, Alpha, Quantum Dots Film (16 and 35mm film negative tangled inside darkened film tent for ten hours and exposed to: neutron, gamma and alpha sources and quantum dots in liquid scintillator – made with the assistance of Lindley Winslow and graduate student, Raspberry at MIT's Neutrino Lab), 2011
- 5 Hour Circular Xray Diffraction Film (16 + 35mm film negative shot with lasers through baked down substances: 5 hour Energy + Melatonin, Excedrin, Phosphorous + Salt Crystals, Metallic Eyeshadow – substance baking and laser shooting by Dr. Scott Speakman at MIT's Xray Diffraction Lab), 2011
- Just Kids Film Necklace – for Patti Smith Film, 2011
- Dawn Surf Jellybowl Film (16mm film negative sanded with surfboard shaping tools, sex wax melted on, squirted, dripped, splashed, sprayed and rubbed with donuts, zinc oxide, cuervo, sunscreen, hydrogen peroxide, tecate, sand, tar, scraped with a shark's tooth, edits made by the surf and a seal while film floated in waves- surfing performed by Andy Perry, Makela Moore, Alanna Moore, Zach Moore, Johnny McCann – shot by Peter West – film negative sanded by Mariah Csepanyi, Andy Perry and Jwest), 2011
- Mascara Rorschach Film (35mm film leader brushed with mascara, intense black, deep purple/fascinating violet, azure blue, curling – mascara brushing by Monica Kogler and Jwest), 2011
- Heavy Metal Sharks Calming Jaws Reversal Film (faded pink super 8 film print – library copy of select scenes from Jaws – from Lorain, Ohio public library – treated with black fabric dye enriched with heavy metals: iron and zinc vitamins, celluloid grated with stone, whipped with hair headbanging, impressed with thumb and pinky prints devil ears – head banging by Monica Kogler and Jwest), 2011
- Heavy Metal Sharks Calming Jaws 2 Trailers – Jumping the Shark Film (faded pink super 16mm film prints TV spots of Jaws 2 – treated with black fabric dye enriched with heavy metals: iron and zinc vitamins, celluloid grated with stone, whipped with hair head banging, impressed with thumb and pinky prints devil ears – headbanging by Monica Kogler and Jwest), 2011
- Drummed Rock Film, 2011
- One Mile Film (5,280 feet of 35mm film negative and print taped to the mile-long High Line walk way in New York City for 17 hours on Thursday, September 13, 2012 with 11,500 visitors – the visitors walked, wrote, jogged, signed, drew, touched, danced, parkoured, sanded, keyed, melted popsicles, spit, scratched, stomped, left shoe prints of all kinds and put gum on the filmstrip – it was driven on by baby stroller and trash can wheels and was traced by art students – people wrote messages on the film and drew animations, etched signs, symbols and words into the film emulsion lines drawn down much of the filmstrip by visitors and Jwest with highlighters and markers – the walk way surfaces of concrete, train track steel, wood, metal gratings and fountain water impressed into the film; filmed images shot by Peter West – filmed Parkour performances by Thomas Dolan and Vertical Jimenez – running on rooftops by Deb Berman and Jwest – film taped, rolled and explained on the High Line by art students and volunteers), 2012
- Behind the Ivory Snow Powdered Detergent Green Door All-American Girl Film (16mm film negative strobe-light double exposed – dripped, doused, splattered, splashed with green, chartreuse and pink dyes and food coloring mixed with ivory snow powdered detergent – strobe lights performed by Jwest, shot by Peter West), 2012
- Spiral of Time Documentary Film (16mm negative strobe-light double and triple exposed – painted with brine shrimp – dripped, splattered and sprayed with salted liquids: balsamic and red wine vinegar, lemon and lime juice, temporary fluorescent hair dyes – photos from friends Mark Titchner, Karen Russo, Aaron Moulton and Ignacio Uriarte and some google maps- texts by Jwest and Chris Markers' Sans Soleil script -shot by Peter West, strobed by Jwest, hands by Ariel West, telecine by Tom Sartori), 2013
- Salt Crystals Spiral Jetty Dead Sea Five Year Film (70mm film negative floated in the Dead Sea and given a healing clay bath in extreme heat in 2008 – stuffed in a suitcase, placed in studio buckets, covered in clay and salt for five years – dragged along the salt encrusted rocks of the Spiral Jetty and thrown in the pink waters in 2013 in below 10 degree weather – Dead Sea floating and mud baths by Mark Titchner, Karen Russo and Jwest – Spiral Jetty dragging and rolling by Aaron Moulton, Ignacio Uriarte and Jwest – DIY telecine frame by frame of salt covered film by Chris Hanke), 2013
- Arrid Extra Dry 1965 TV Commercial Film (16mm film print painted with birth control pills, writing inks and sweat – bought from a Brooklyn, New York street vendor), 2013
- 44 Mile Film (35mm print, negative and 70mm film leader scanned by hand and re-photographed on 16mm negative collaged with animation, phone videos and stills, googlemaps and scrolling website videos – 16mm double-exposed with flowing water over glass – 35mm negative and print dragged through a 44-mile slot canyon between Utah and Arizona and rubbed on Wrather Arch, filmstrips imprinted into primordial mud next to large mountain lion paw prints – 16mm dripped with river water and watercolor inks laced with electrolytes – 16mm and 35mm moon shot by Peter West – hand-scanning by Chris Hanke – animation by Daylen Chiang – "scratch film" Snickers candy bar filmstrip from Christy's Editorial – digital photos and videos by Peter West, Chris Hanke and Jwest), 2014
- Terrazzo Floor Spiral Film (16mm negative filmstrips taped to tables at Casal Solleric in Mallorca, Spain – where visitors melted candle wax, wrote, scratched, smeared lipstick, rubbed soppressata, crumbled cookies, made marks with beer bottles and spilled wine on the filmstrips – double exposed images of mosaic floors and telecine machines of Fotokem labs in Los Angeles shot by Peter West), 2014
- Film Title Poem, 2016

== Zines ==
West often produces Zines for her exhibitions and performances. Early Zines were made with black and white production stills from the making of her films. They have been given away at her exhibitions for free. Most zines have been published in editions of 500.

=== Zines to date ===
- suck my left one. 2018. Laser prints on clear film. spiral bound. 240 pages. Artist book edition of 5.
- Movie Memories. 2016. Color xerox. Published by ICA London on the occasion of the 2016 Art Night London. 6 pages.
- Spirals of Time. 2013. Two-color risograph. Published by Golden Spike Press. 28 pages. Edition of 500.
- Accordion Zine. 2011. Hand-taped. Produced by Jennifer West in conjunction with "Heavy Metals: Iron and Zinc" at Vilma Gold, London.
- Smoke, Mirrors, Darts and Lavender Mist. 2010. Produced by the Contemporary Art Museum, Houston, Texas in conjunction with Perspectives 176: Jennifer West. Curated by Valerie Cassel Oliver.
- Shred the Gnar Full Moon Film Noir. 2010. Produced by the Aspen Art Museum, Aspen, Colorado in conjunction with performance and exhibitions, Shred the Gnar Full Moon Noir. Curated by Matthew Thompson.
- Wheels Ink Ho-ho's and Melon, Skate the Sky Film Production Stills. 2009. Produced by Vilma Gold and Marc Foxx Gallery in conjunction with performance and screening at Tate Modern, London, UK. Curated by Stuart Comer.
- Pomegranate Juice and Pepper Spray Production Stills. 2009. Produced by Jennifer West and Marc Foxx Gallery in conjunction with "Pomegranate and Pepper Spray" solo exhibition at Marc Foxx Gallery, Los Angeles.
- Electric Kool-aid and the Mezcal Worm Production Stills. 2008. Produced by Jennifer West in conjunction with solo exhibition, "Electric Kool-aid and the Mezcal Worm" at Vilma Gold, London.
- Jennifer West. Production Stills 2008. Produced by Vilma Gold in conjunction with Jennifer West's Statements Presentation at Art Basel 30, Switzerland.
- The W.C. #19 (Volume 2 Number 7) Jennifer West Production Stills (AKA Jwest). 2007. Produced by White Columns. Curated by Matthew Higgs.
