= Desagüe =

Massive drainage and water management project around Mexico City

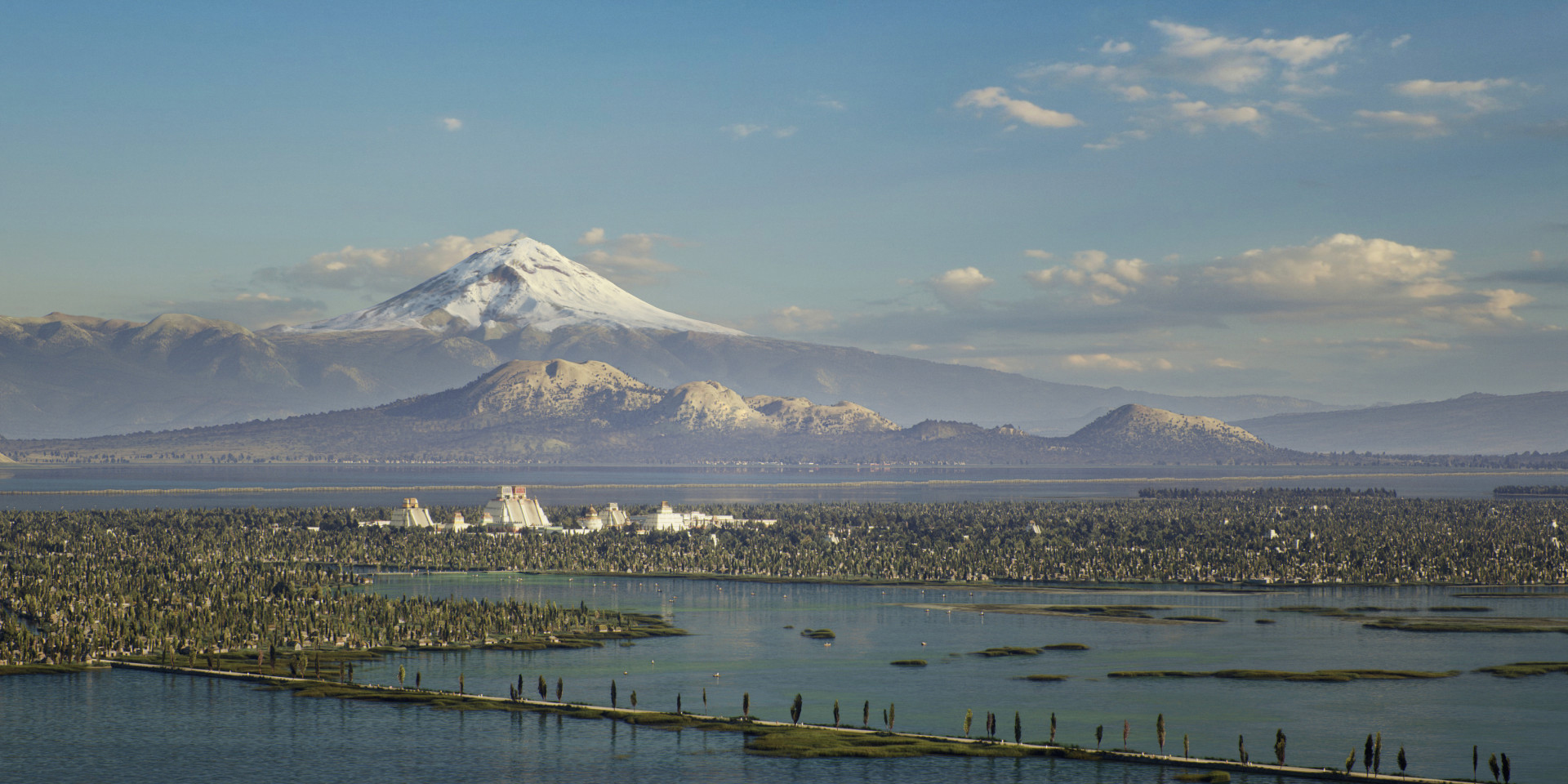
View of Tenochtitlan and Lake Texcoco, recreated by the Portrait of Tenochtitlan project

The Desagüe was the hydraulic engineering project to drain Mexico's central lake system in order to protect the capital from persistent and destructive flooding. Begun in the sixteenth century and completed in the late nineteenth century, it has been deemed "the greatest engineering project of colonial Spanish America." Historian Charles Gibson goes further and considers it "one of the largest engineering enterprises of pre-industrial society anywhere in the world." There had been periodic flooding of the prehispanic Aztec capital of Tenochtitlan, the site which became the Spanish capital of Mexico City. Flooding continued to be a threat to the viceregal capital, so at the start of the seventeenth century, the crown ordered a solution to the problem that entailed the employment of massive numbers of indigenous laborers who were compelled to work on the drainage project. The crown also devoted significant funding. A tunnel and later a surface drainage system diverted flood waters outside the closed basin of Mexico. Not until the late nineteenth century under Porfirio Díaz (1876-1911) was the project completed by British entrepreneur and engineer, Weetman Pearson, using machinery imported from Great Britain and other technology at a cost of 16 million pesos, a vast sum at the time. The ecological impact was long lasting, with desiccation permanently changing the ecology of the Basin of Mexico.

== Early history ==
In the period before the Spanish conquest, the Aztec capital of Tenochtitlan had been subject to flooding during prolonged rains. There was no natural drainage of the lake system outside the closed basin. In the late 1440s, the ruler of Tenochtitlan, Moctezuma I, and the ruler of the allied kingdom of Texcoco, Nezahualcoyotl, ordered a dike (albarradón) to be constructed, which was expanded under the rule of Ahuitzotl. The dike was in place when the Spanish conquered Tenochtitlan in 1521, but major flooding in 1555-56 prompted the construction of a second dike. The Spanish made plans for diverting flood waters following that flooding, but took no action. Post-conquest damage to the surrounding watershed by the cutting of trees and the silting of the lake likely exacerbated the existing tendencies toward flooding. Flooding in 1604 and 1607 damaged buildings in the capital and crown officials took steps to devote capital and labor into solving the problem. Since forced indigenous labor was a resource that the crown could draw on, thousands of indigenous men were put to work digging a tunnel to divert flood waters. The operation was similar to mining work. The crown also engaged a Dutch engineer, Adrian Boot, to assess the problem. The Netherlands were part of the Spanish Hapsburg Empire, so it is not surprising that a Dutch expertise was brought to bear. Boot recommended reverting to a dike to control flooding. Work was begun on one, but huge rains in 1628 overtook the project. Mexico City was in crisis. Food was scarce. Most of the population fled, and buildings collapsed. The crown even proposed moving the capital to the mainland. The tunnel was converted to an open cut trench. In the decade of the greatest crisis, the crown spent 1.5 million pesos on the Desagüe, with the labor of an untold number of indigenous workers, but certainly numbering in the tens of thousands. The crown put an end to coerced agricultural labor, but continued with compulsory labor for the Desagüe. A section of the colonial archives in Mexico City are devoted to the documentation on the Desagüe.

== Nineteenth and twentieth centuries ==
With Mexican independence from Spain in 1821, the Mexican state ended compulsory indigenous labors. The need for maintenance of the Desagüe open cut drainage continued in the post-independence era. With political stability achieved under President Porfirio Díaz, the Desagüe became a centerpiece of Mexico's drive for modernity. It was inaugurated with great fanfare in 1900, touted as one of the great achievements of the modern era in Mexico. With Mexico City's location at the low point of the basin of Mexico, drainage of rainwater, industrial waste from tanneries and abattoirs, and human sewage concentrated there. Awareness that such pollution posed a risk and was a major impediment to Mexico's project of modernization, the daunting task was to find a solution. Although flood waters had long been a physical threat to the capital, in the late nineteenth century, they were also now seen as a threat to urban sanitation and public health. Infant mortality was high as was general mortality in the capital when the government tackled anew the drainage project. Initially a network of dikes and holding tanks was tried hold back excess water was tried, but was unsuccessful. Work during the colonial era was by manpower wielding hand tools of shovels and pickaxes, and progress was limited due to the high water table that quickly filled the drainage ditch. Much of Mexican modernization during the Porfiriato relied on foreign expertise and capital. British entrepreneur Weetman Pearson, instrumental in developing Mexico's petroleum industry, imported British-made machinery that was assembled in Mexico. Mechanization of digging overcame previous limitations. The project saw the construction of a deep and straight trench in the basin of Mexico and construction of a tunnel through the eastern mountains. A massive dredge 40 meters long, made of timbers and booms, with a steam engine mounted on the deck was used. The machinery had 40 buckets in a line to dredge sludge from the bottom of the cut, raised it to the surface, and then discharge it into train cars to be deposited elsewhere. The surface cut was 47 kilometers long, with the tunnel through the mountains another 10 kilometers.

== See also ==
- History of Mexico City
- New Spain
- Water supply and sanitation in Mexico
