= Sydney Works =

Building in Sheffield, England

Coordinates: 53.3754°N 1.4678°W

Sydney Works or Sidney Works is a building on Matilda Street in Sheffield, England. It has seen a variety of uses, and occupies a prominent site beside the Porter Brook, surrounded by car parks.

The site was originally occupied by the City Saw Mills. It was occupied by four back-to-back buildings used until the 1970s by various small industrial businesses, most prominently Deakins Silversmiths, later renamed Sydney Silversmiths.

The rear wing of the building was constructed in 1902.

In the 1970s, the building was used by a printing co-operative. From 1982 it was home to Yorkshire ArtSpace, which converted much of the space into studios, becoming the first cultural organisation in what later became the Cultural Industries Quarter. In 2001, Yorkshire Artspace moved to purpose-built premises at Persistence Works, and the building stood largely empty, other than a small part used by a recording studio.

In 2005, the Works were used as a convergence centre for opposition to the G8 Finance Ministers' meeting in Sheffield. Renamed the "Matilda", it was then developed as a squatted social centre, including gig spaces, artists' studios, exhibition space, IT facilities, a cafe and several meeting spaces. In June 2006, Yorkshire Forward, who had acquired the building, secured a court order demanding the eviction of the occupants.

In autumn 2012 work has begun for a "New build and refurbishment of existing Sidney Works buildings to form a new university technical college, with associated external works including flood lit rooftop multi-use games area"
