= Yin Cao =

Chinese epidemiologist and oncologist

- Occupations: Epidemiologist; oncologist
- Awards: Guggenheim Fellowship (2026)

Academic background
- Education: Peking University (BS); Tsinghua University (BS); Columbia University (MPH); Harvard T.H. Chan School of Public Health (ScD)

Academic work
- Discipline: Epidemiology; oncology
- Sub-discipline: Early-onset cancer
- Institutions: Washington University School of Medicine

Yin Cao is a Chinese epidemiologist and oncologist based in the United States. A 2026 Guggenheim Fellow, she is Professor of Surgery and Professor of Medicine at the Washington University School of Medicine Division of Public Health Sciences.

== Biography ==
Yin Cao obtained a BS in Economics from Peking University and a BS in Biology from Tsinghua University, both in 2007. She later studied in the United States, obtaining a Master of Public Health from Columbia University in 2009. She later attended the Harvard T.H. Chan School of Public Health, where she obtained a Doctor of Science in Epidemiology in 2013 and became a postdoctoral research fellow in 2015.

Cao joined the Washington University School of Medicine, where she became associate professor of surgery and of medicine in the Division of Public Health Sciences. In addition to her professorial work, she leads the WashU Digestive Diseases Research Core Center's Cancer Grand Challenges Team PROSPECT. She also works at the adjacent Alvin J. Siteman Cancer Center as a researcher. She has also served as an associate editor of the Journal of the National Cancer Institute.

Cao researches clinical and molecular epidemiology and oncology, and she is the Principal Investigator of the Cao Lab, a research program in WashU Medicine which centers on the early-onset cancers. She was among five who received a 2018 National Comprehensive Cancer Network Foundation Young Investigator Award, as well as a 2020 National Institutes of Health MERIT Award. She and Sumera I. Ilyas won the 2023 American Gastroenterological Association Young Investigator Award in Basic and Clinical Science. In 2026, she was awarded a Guggenheim Fellowship in Data Science, which will fund a book project on the rise of earlier age occurrence of cancer. She was also appointed a fellow of the American Gastroenterological Association the same year.
