= Angela Garcia (anthropologist) =

American anthropologist and ethnographer

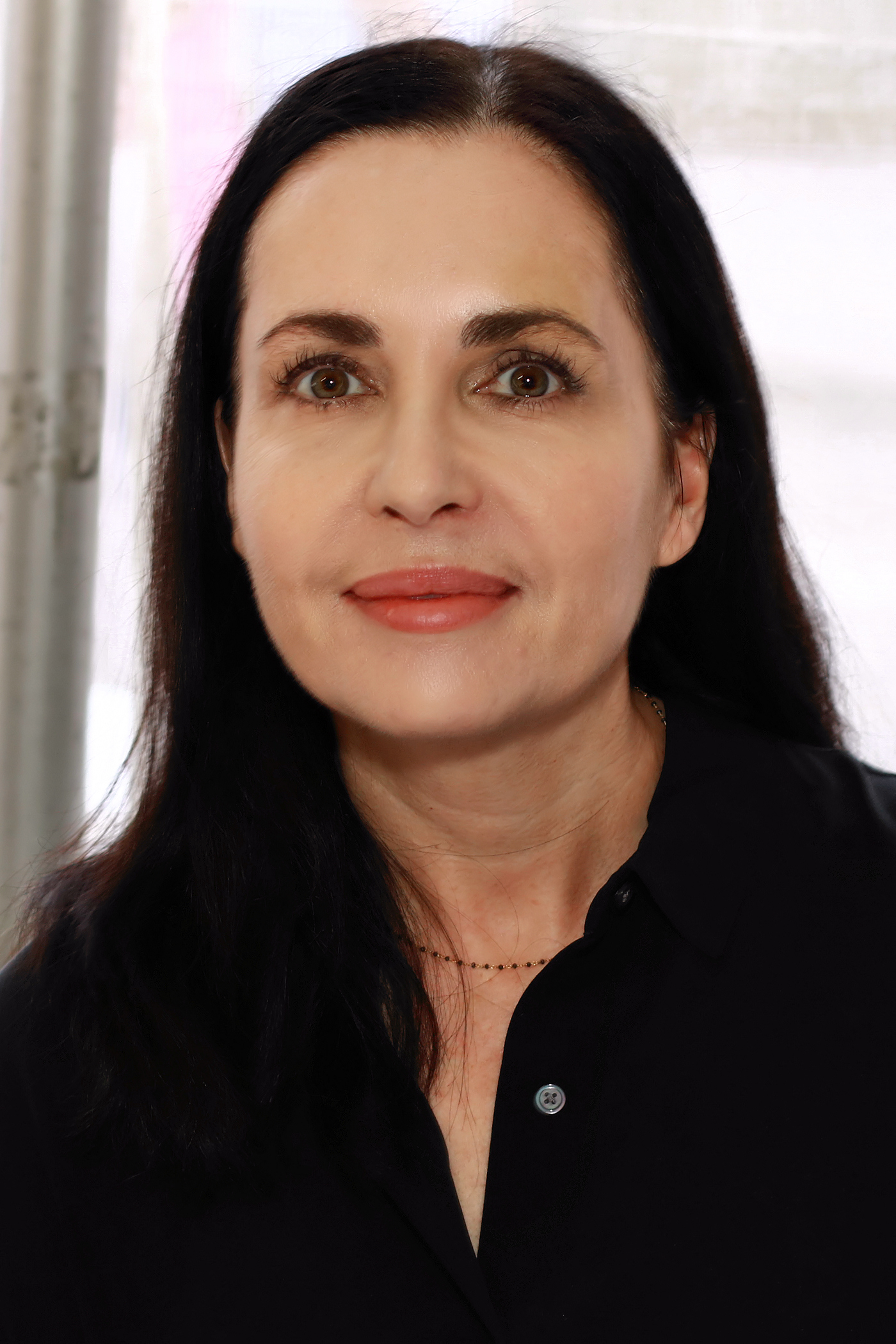
- At the 2024 Texas Book Festival
- Born: 1971 (age 54–55)
- Education: UC Berkeley; Harvard University
- Occupations: Anthropologist, ethnographer

Angela Garcia (born 1971) is an American anthropologist and ethnographer whose research examines addiction, violence, kinship, and care in the United States and Mexico.

A scholar known for long-term, immersive fieldwork and literary ethnographic style, she is professor and Chair of the Department of Anthropology at Stanford University. Garcia is the author of two major monographs—The Way That Leads Among the Lost: Life, Death, and Hope in Mexico City's Anexos (2024) and The Pastoral Clinic: Addiction and Dispossession Along the Rio Grande (2010)—and numerous influential articles on addiction, kinship, archives, and urban ecology.

== Education ==
Garcia received her B.A. (summa cum laude; Kroeber Award; Phi Beta Kappa) from the University of California, Berkeley (1997) and earned her Ph.D. in anthropology from Harvard University in 2007. Her early life and field origins are tied to northern New Mexico, a region that has informed much of her research on addiction and dispossession. Garcia has held faculty appointments at the University of California, Irvine and Stanford University and has been recognized with multiple awards for ethnographic writing and scholarship.

== Career ==
Garcia began her postdoctoral work as a President’s Postdoctoral Fellow in the Department of Anthropology at UCLA (2007–2008), served as Assistant Professor of Anthropology at the University of California, Irvine (2008–2011), and joined Stanford University’s Department of Anthropology as Assistant Professor in 2011. She was promoted to Associate Professor in 2016 and was appointed Professor and Chair of the Department in 2024. Garcia holds affiliated faculty roles in Chicanx/Latinx Studies; Comparative Studies of Race and Ethnicity; Feminist, Gender, and Sexuality Studies; Latin American Studies; and Urban Studies. Her public writing and essays have appeared in venues reaching broad audiences, and several of her books have received literary and disciplinary prizes.

== Research and scholarly works ==
Garcia’s scholarship interrogates how structural violence, historical dispossession, and intimate relations shape practices of addiction, treatment, and care. The Pastoral Clinic (2010) links intergenerational heroin use in northern New Mexico to colonial histories of land loss and economic marginalization, while The Way That Leads Among the Lost (2024) offers a sustained ethnography of Mexico City’s anexos—informal, often coercive rehabilitation spaces—arguing that they function simultaneously as sites of therapeutic violence, refuge, and kin-protective labor amid widespread state absence and narcoviolence.

Her articles extend these concerns into archival ethnographies, cinematic and narrative approaches to crisis, and collaborative studies of recovery and self-help organizations. Garcia’s work is notable for combining theoretical rigor with immersive narrative and for addressing policy-relevant questions about care, incarceration, and public health. She is currently engaged in two research projects. The first concerns Mexico City’s historical drainage project (the desagüe) and its ongoing social, ecological, and bodily effects. The second project is on the growth and destruction of Santa Rita del Cobre, a historic New Mexican mining community, and chronicles the poverty, racism, and addiction that haunt the region today.

== Awards ==
Her first book, The Pastoral Clinic, earned major national recognition, winning the Victor Turner Prize from the American Anthropological Association’s Society for Humanistic Anthropology in 2012 and the PEN Center USA & UC Press Award for Exceptional First Book in 2010.

Her second book, The Way That Leads Among the Lost, received the New Millenium Book Award from the American Anthropological Association’s Society for Medical Anthropology in 2025.

She also received the Stirling Prize from the Society for Psychological Anthropology in 2009 for her article “The Elegiac Addict.” Garcia’s early career honors include a Faculty Fellowship from the University of California Institute for Mexico and the United States (2010), a President’s Postdoctoral Fellowship at UCLA (2007–2008), and three major national doctoral fellowships: the Ford Foundation Pre-doctoral Fellowship from the National Academies of Sciences (2005), a National Institute of Mental Health Pre-doctoral Fellowship (2003), and the National Science Foundation Graduate Research Fellowship (2002).

== Selected bibliography ==
=== Books ===
- Garcia, A. (2024). The way that leads among the lost: Life, death, and hope in Mexico City’s anexos. Farrar, Straus and Giroux. New Millennium Book Award, Society for Medical Anthropology (American Anthropological Association), 2025; Publishers Weekly starred review; Booklist starred review; New York Times Editor’s Choice.
- Garcia, A. (2010). The pastoral clinic: Addiction and dispossession along the Rio Grande. University of California Press. Victor Turner Prize for Ethnographic Writing (Society for Humanistic Anthropology), 2012; PEN Center USA & UC Press Award for Exceptional First Book, 2010; Stirling Prize, Society for Psychological Anthropology, 2009.

=== Selected articles ===
- Garcia, Angela (September 29, 2023). "The confessional community". American Ethnologist. 50 (4): 622–631. doi:10.1111/amet.13204. ISSN 0094-0496.
- Garcia, Angela (July 25, 2019). "Fragments of Relatedness: Writing, Archiving, and the Vicissitudes of Kinship". Ethnos. 85 (4): 717–729. doi:10.1080/00141844.2019.1645190. ISSN 0014-1844.
- Garcia, Angela (March 1, 2017). "The Rainy Season". Social Text. 35 (1): 101–121. doi:10.1215/01642472-3728020. ISSN 0164-2472.
- Garcia, Angela (November 6, 2016). "The Blue Years: An Ethnography of a Prison Archive". Cultural Anthropology. 31 (4): 571–594. doi:10.14506/ca31.4.06. ISSN 1548-1360.
- Garcia, Angela; Anderson, Brian (2016). "Violence, addiction, recovery: An anthropological study of Mexico's anexos". Transcultural Psychiatry. 53 (4): 445–464. doi:10.1177/1363461516662539. ISSN 1363-4615. PMC 5531188.
- Garcia, Angela (May 14, 2015). "Serenity: Violence, Inequality, and Recovery on the Edge of Mexico City". Medical Anthropology Quarterly. 29 (4): 455–472. doi:10.1111/maq.12208. ISSN 0745-5194.
