= Natalia Molina =

American historian and professor

Natalia Molina is an American historian, author and Distinguished Professor of American Studies and Ethnicity at the University of Southern California. She is most prominently known for writing Fit To Be Citizens? Public Health and Race in Los Angeles, 1879-1939, How Race Is Made in America: Immigration, Citizenship, and the Historical Power of Racial Scripts, and A Place at the Nayarit: How a Mexican Restaurant Nourished a Community. She has also published numerous journal articles, op-eds and essays. Her works have touched on topics of race formation, gender, citizenship, culture and migration. She received a 2020 MacArthur Fellowship for her work on race and citizenship.

== Education and employment ==
Molina received her B.A. (1993) from the University of California, Los Angeles in History and Gender Studies. She later received her M.A. (1996) and Ph.D. (2001) from the University of Michigan. Soon after, Molina taught in the Department of History and Ethnic Studies and the Urban Studies Program at the University of California, San Diego. During her tenure at USCD, she served as associate dean of the Division of Arts and Humanities and associate vice chancellor for Faculty Diversity and Equity. In 2018, she joined the faculty of the Department of American Studies and Ethnicity at the University of Southern California where she currently teaches.

Molina was also the Director of the University of California Education Abroad Program in Spain and a member of the Faculty Advisory Committee for the University of California’s President’s Postdoctoral Fellowship Program.

== Major works ==
Molina's work focuses on the intersections of race, gender, labor, immigration, and urban history. More specifically, Molina considers the narratives of differing immigrant groups and their relational understandings of belonging, race formation and citizenship.

=== Fit to Be Citizens?: Public Health and Race in Los Angeles, 1879-1940 (2006) ===
Molina's 2006 Fit to be Citizens? Public Health and Race in Los Angeles, 1879-1940 explores how race was constructed in the early twentieth century through science and public health campaigns that sought to categorize different immigrant groups. Molina's study delves into documented histories of Chinese, Japanese and Mexican immigrants who were subject to classifications, such as healthy or disease-ridden, that limited their access to housing and medical services, while also perpetuating harmful rhetoric that portrayed these migrant groups as threats to public health. Molina's work also reveals the ways in which these immigrant groups would protest such injustice.

=== How Race Is Made in America (2013) ===
Molina's 2013 book How Race Is Made in America: Immigration, Citizenship, and the Historical Power of Racial Scripts examines Mexican immigration to the United States. Focusing on the years between 1924-1965, Molina argues that during this time period an immigration regime emerged that would define racial categories in the U.S., such as Mexican American. These categories, Molina writes, persist in current perceptions of race and ethnicity. How Race Is Made in America shows how racial scripts are easily adopted and adapted to apply to different racial groups. The book's argument connects the experiences of different racialized groups by demonstrating how racial scripts are often transplanted from one group to another.

=== Relational Formations of Race: Theory, Method, and Practice (Co-editor, 2019) ===
Co-authored by Natalia Molina, Daniel Martínez Hosang, and Ramón Gutiérrez, Relational Formations of Race: Theory, Method, and Practice explores the history of racial formations in the United States while advancing a framework for analyzing race relationally. The authors challenge traditional approaches that center whiteness in racial studies, instead emphasizing the interconnectedness of racial categories and their historical evolution. Drawing on examples such as Chicanx history, settler colonialism, immigration activism, and American Indian historiographies, the book highlights how racial groups navigate and negotiate power dynamics while adapting racial constructions tactically. Through its interdisciplinary approach, the volume encourages scholars to adopt relational methodologies to deepen understanding of race and its socio-political implications.

=== A Place at the Nayarit: How a Mexican Restaurant Nourished a Community (2022) ===
Molina's 2022 book A Place at the Nayarit: How a Mexican Restaurant Nourished a Community explores the history of the Nayarit, a Mexican restaurant in Echo Park formerly owned by Molina's grandmother, Doña Natalia Barraza. Molina positions the Nayarit as an urban anchor that offered a safe space for ethnic Mexicans, gay men, and divorced single women in the 1960s. The restaurant facilitated what Molina refers to as "placemaking," where workers, patrons, and family asserted their belonging in a neighborhood shaped by nativism, gentrification, and homophobia. As Molina states, these placemakers were "creating meaning, establishing links with one another, and... asserting their place in a nation that often seemed intent on pushing them to the margins".

Doña Natalia sponsored immigrants, many of whom worked at her restaurant. This support enabled employees and patrons to start businesses and access new opportunities. Dona Natalia's support was influenced by what Molina calls patria chica, or local community pride. Molina's focus on the community formed at the Nayarita illustrates translocality, showing how immigrant social networks can transform local cultural and economic landscapes across national boundaries.

Molina will donate all 2022 proceeds from the book to No Us Without You, a 501c3 organization which offers food security resources to undocumented immigrants in the greater Los Angeles area.

=== Forthcoming Work: The Silent Hands that Shaped the Huntington: A History of Its Mexican Workers ===
This work will tell the story of Henry E. Huntington and the Huntington Library from the perspective of Mexican workers. By taking this approach, Molina seeks to demonstrate how the library transformed Southern California's racial landscape and how Mexican immigrant labor contributed to the development of a racially stratified political economy.

== Scholarly reception ==
Molina's scholarship has been described as "an exciting contribution to the growing body of scholarship that knits the history of medicine and public health more tightly into the fabric of the American past" and as "a promising methodology for the fields of history, Chicana/o and Latina/o studies, and urban studies".

Molina's work has also been cited in journal articles and books that expand on themes of placemaking for urban ethnic communities, transnational relationships, and spatial politics such as in A Good Reputation: How Residents Fight for an American Barrio Flavors of East LA in the Heart of Seoul: Transnational Korean Adoptee Food Ways and Suburban Restaurants as Evolving Suburban Anchors .

In October 2020, Molina received a 2020 MacArthur Fellowship. The citation noted her work connecting historical racial narratives about immigration to current policy debates.

== Awards ==
- 2003-2004: Post-doctoral Fellowship, Ford Foundation
- 2007: PCB-American Historical Association's Norris and Carol Hundley Award
- 2010: Distinguished Speaker, Organization of American Historians
- 2013-2014: Academic Senate Distinguished Teaching Award, UC San Diego,
- 2015: National Endowment for the Humanities Fellowship Recipient, Public Scholar Award
- 2017-2018: National Endowment for the Humanities Fellowship Recipient, Public Scholar Award
- 2019-2020: Inaugural Faculty Fellow, “The Humanities and the University of the Future,” Andrew W. Mellon Foundation
- 2020: MacArthur Foundation "Genius Grant" Fellowship
- 2021: Society of American Historians, Elected member
- 2022-2023: USC Phi Kappa Phi Faculty Recognition Award
- 2023-2024: James Beard Award Finalist
- 2023-2024: USC or School/Dept Award for Teaching, USC Faculty Mentoring Award for Mentoring Graduate Students
- 2020-2021: Huntington Library Research Fellowship Recipient

== Selected works ==
- Fit To Be Citizens? Public Health and Race in Los Angeles, 1879-1939. University of California Press, 2006
- How Race Is Made in America: Immigration, Citizenship, and the Historical Power of Racial Scripts, University of California Press, 2013
- Relational Formations of Race: Theory, Method and Practice. University of California Press, 2019
- A Place at the Nayarit: How a Mexican Restaurant Nourished a Community. University of Chicago Press, 2022
