= Portrait of Tenochtitlan =

2023 render of Tenochtitlan by Thomas Kole

- Retrato de Tenochtitlan (Spanish), In ixtli, in yollotl, in Tenochtitlan (Nahuatl languages)
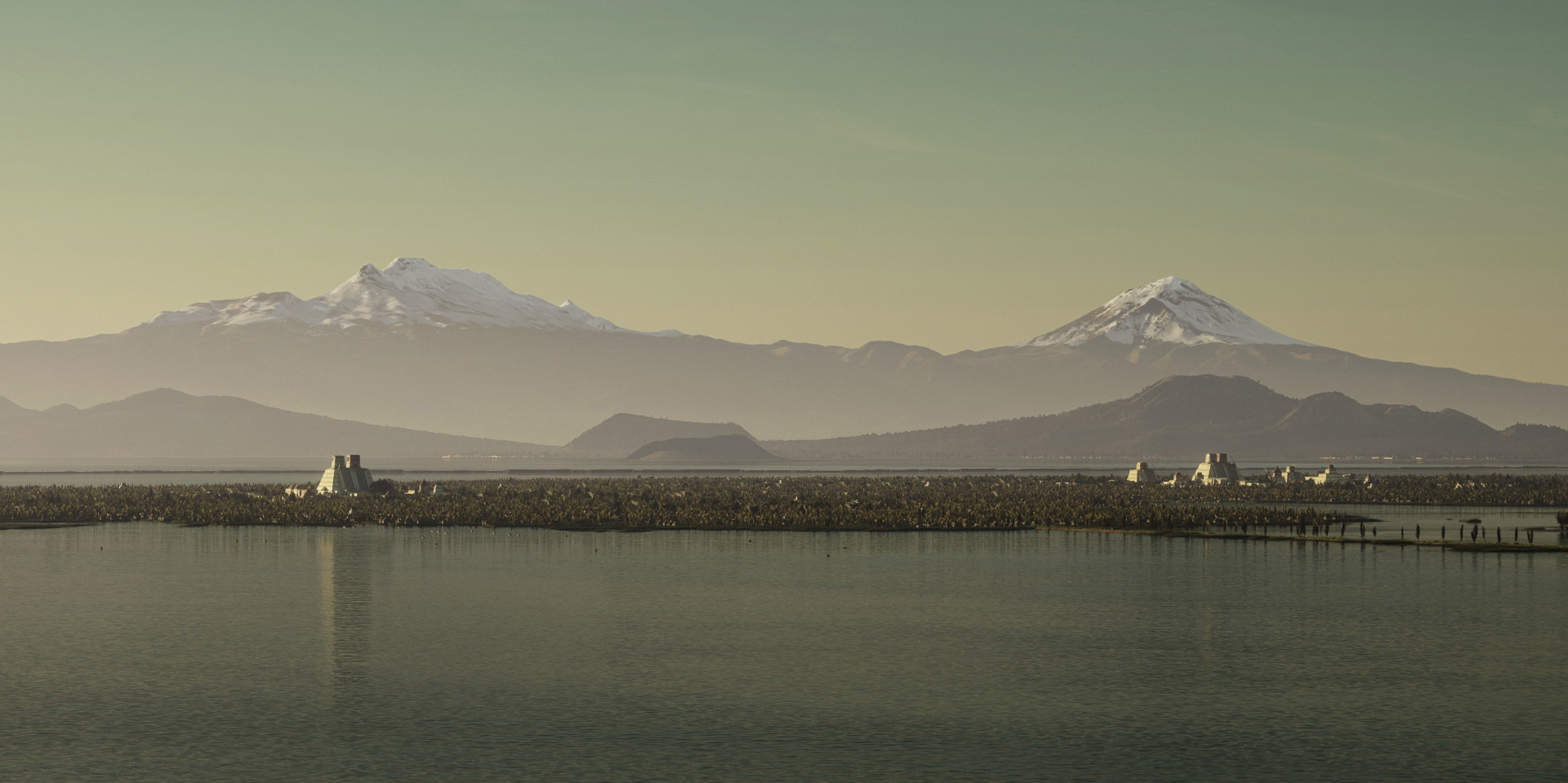
- The twin cities of Tenochtitlan and Tlatelolco against the backdrop of the Popocatépetl and Ixtacchíhuatl volcanos
- Artist: Thomas Kole
- Year: 2023
- Movement: Digital art
- Subject: Tenochtitlan
- Website: https://tenochtitlan.thomaskole.nl/index.html

Portrait of Tenochtitlan is a render of Tenochtitlan and the Valley of Mexico at the start of the 16th century by Dutch programmer Thomas Kole using 3D computer graphics. Drone photography by Mexican geomatic engineer Andrés Semo was used to compare the past with present-day Mexico City. The unbiased rendering won critical acclaim as a credible image of the Mexica capital.

== Development ==
The images were developed in 2022 and 2023 with open-source software engines Blender, Gimp and Darktable. The project used historical and archeological sources and expert advice.

== Launch ==
The images were launched on the website of the project in September 2023 with a text in English, Spanish and Nahuatl, the latter translated by Rodrigo Ortega Acoltzi. The project was published under Creative Commons-license BY 4.0.

== Reception ==
The Spanish-language edition of National Geographic published an article on Portrait of Tenochtitlan and the website went viral. During Kole’s first-ever visit to Mexico City in February 2024, Kole, Semo, and Ortega gave a presentation at the National Museum of Anthropology that was well received. A second presentation was given at the Tlatelolco Cultural Centre.

== Gallery ==
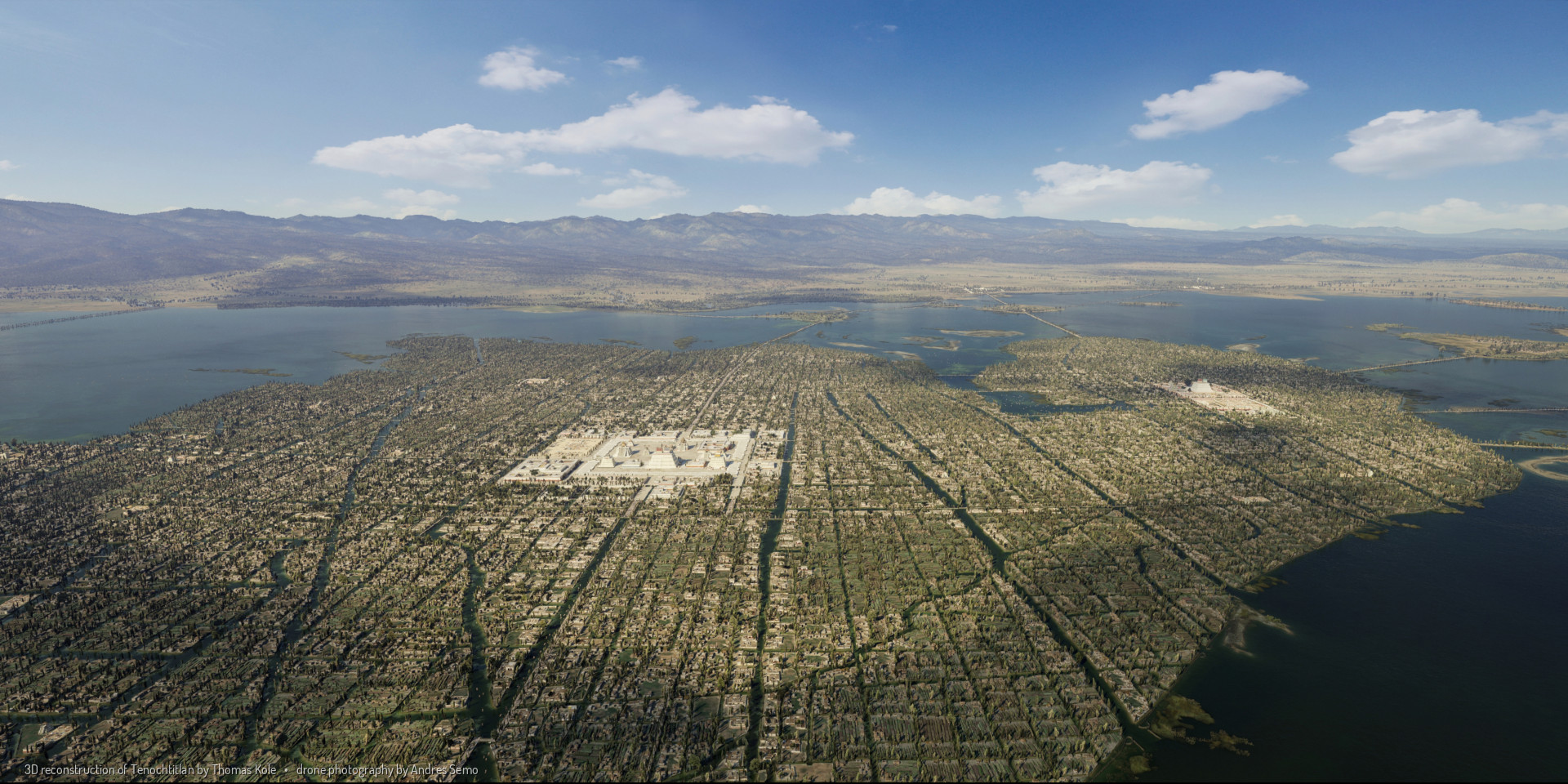
View to the West

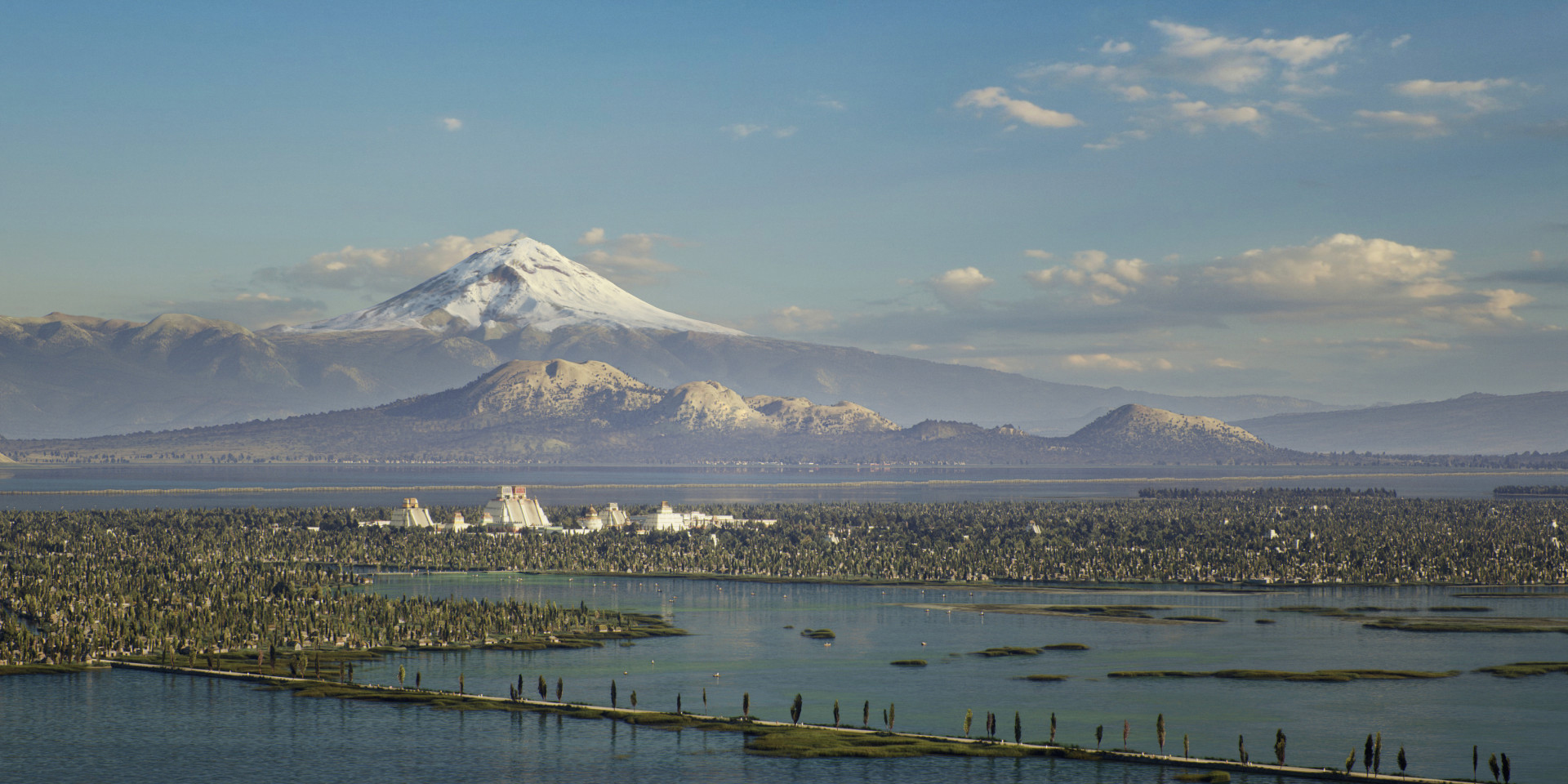
Tenochtitlan and the Popocatépetl volcano

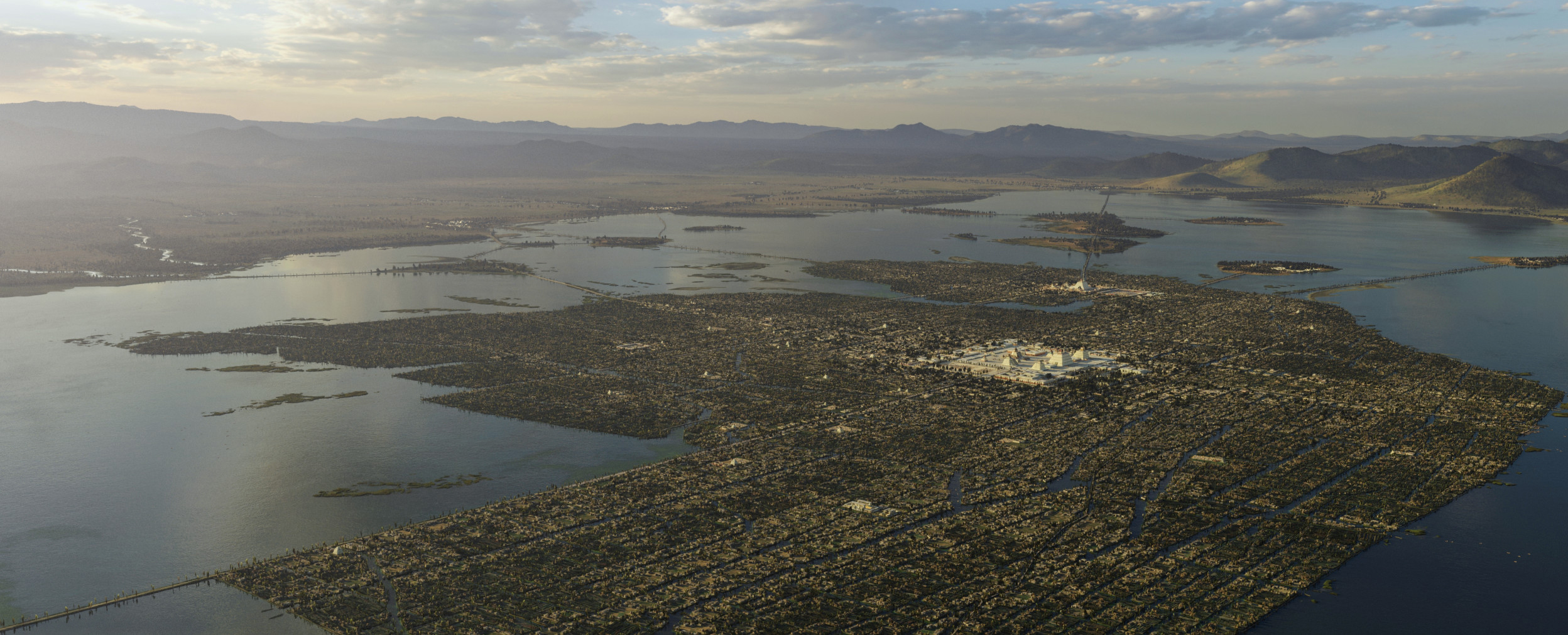
View of Tenochtitlan looking towards Tenayuca
