= Michael Ross (artist) =

American contemporary artist (born 1954)

- Born: 1954 (age 71–72); Buffalo, New York, U.S.
- Known for: Sculpture

Michael Ross (born 1954 in Buffalo, New York) is an American contemporary artist, known for his small-scale sculptures. Although Michael Ross has exhibited conceptually based works including performance, mail art, video, and audience participation projects, the last twenty years have seen the artist direct his focus toward small, precise wall mounted sculptures created from scraps, unidentifiable hardware and miscellaneous things. Michael Ross's earliest small-scale sculpture consisted of a single upright thimble containing the dust from several rooms of his home. A small work created by the artist in 1994 made a wry salute to large-scale minimal metal sculptures like those of Donald Judd. Over the years, Ross has also created numerous unique tiny sculptures inspired by the Japanese fairy tales of the writer Lafcadio Hearn. His focus on the minuscule has justly identified the artist as, "a true scholar of the tiny kingdom" and “a pioneer of the subversive small gesture”. Michael Ross received his BFA at The State University of New York, Buffalo and his MFA at Columbia University in New York, NY.

== Exhibitions ==
=== Selected solo exhibitions ===
- 2019 Michael Ross, Galeria Mascota, Mexico City, Mexico
- 2017 Michael Ross, En Passant, Ledge Gallery, Eli and Edythe Broad Art Museum, MSU, East Lansing, Michigan
- 2016 Michael Ross, Tatjana Pieters, Ghent, Belgium
- 2016 Michael Ross, Selected Works 1991 – 2015, Ellis King, Dublin, Ireland
- 2006 Sculpture Center, Long Island City, New York
- 2002 Lobby project, Swiss Institute, New York, NY
- 2001 FRAC Bourgogne, Dijon, France
- 1999 Scott Thatcher Gallery, Long Island City, New York
- 1998 Drie Boeken, Boekhandel Metro, Ghent, Belgium
- 1998 Goldororo, In Vitro, Geneva, Switzerland
- 1994 Kunstverein Schwabisch Gmund, Germany
- 1994 Micromacroscopics, vor ort, Langenhagen, Germany

=== Selected group exhibitions ===
- 2020 Silent Water, Galeria Mascota, Mexico City, Mexico
- 2020 100 Sculptures, No Gallery, Los Angeles, CA
- 2019 The OsloBIENNALEN First Edition 2019-2024, Oslo, Norway
- 2019 100 Sculptures (Paris!), Anonymous Gallery pop-up, Paris, France
- 2019 Gallery Galerie Galería, Jack Barrett Gallery, New York, NY
- 2018 10 Years:100 Sculptures, Anonymous Gallery, Mexico City, Mexico
- 2018 From the Collection/Against the Wall, Stedelijk Museum voor Actuele Kunst (S.M.A.K.), Ghent, Belgium
- 2017 Summer Hang, Tatjana Pieters, Ghent, Belgium
- 2017 MIDTOWN, organized by Maccarone, Salon 94 and Salon 94 Design, Lever House, New York
- 2017 The City, My Studio / The City, My Life, Kathmandu Triennial, Kathmandu, Nepal
- 2017 GAGARIN the Artists in their Own Words. 2000-2016 | The String Traveller, Stedelijk Museum voor Actuele Kunst
- 2016 Skins, Ellis King, Dublin, Ireland
- 2015 Possible Collection, Honolulu, Zurich, Switzerland
- 2011 Fait Main, collection of FRAC Bourgogne, Lycee des matiers de la ceramique Henry Mosiand, Longchamp, France
- 2010 The Open Mind of Lafcadio Hearn, Donjon, Matsue Castle, Matsue, Japan
- 2009 Bribes d'Un Monde Ephemere, Musee d'Art et d'Histoire Romain Rolland, Clamecy, France
- 2009 Ename Actueel, Hoofdstuk VI, Oudenaarde-Ename, Belgium
- 2009 Un Lieu Oublie, collection of FRAC Bourgogne, C.A.U.E. de Cote-d-Or, Dijon, France
- 2006 Sogneurs de Gravite Marcel at the Bit! (The Imitation of Marcel Duchamp), FRAC Languedoc-Roussillon, France
- 2005 Monuments For The U.S.A., White Columns, New York, NY
- 2005 Monuments For The U.S.A., CCA Wattis Institute for Contemporary Art, San Francisco, CA
- 2003 Dust Memories, Swiss Institute, New York, NY
- 2002 Autour du monde, Communaute de Communes du Canton de Chauffailles, Chauffailles, France
- 2001 Sonsbeek 9, Arnhem, The Netherlands
- 2001 Present, Museum voor Moderne Kunst, Arnhem, The Netherlands
- 2000 Over The Edges, City of Ghent, Belgium
- 2000 Dust & Dirt, Witte Zaal, Ghent, Belgium
- 2000 Bricolage?, Musee des Beaux-Arts de Dijon, Dijon, France
- 1999 Inaugural exhibition, Stedelijk Museum voor Actuele Kunst, Ghent Belgium
- 1999 Risiko Curating Kunstverein Neuhausen, Germany
- 1998 Poussiere (Dust Memories), FRAC Bourgogne, Dijon, France
- 1997 Enough, The Tannery, London, England
- 1997 Bring Your Own Walkman, W139, Amsterdam, The Netherlands
- 1997 At the Threshold of the Visible: Minuscule and Small-Scale Art 1964-1996, Herbert F. Johnson Museum Of Art, Cornell University, Ithaca, NY (traveling)
- 1997 Show Up, de Appel Foundation, Amsterdam, the Netherlands
- 1996 de Rode Poort, Museum van Hedendaagse Kunst Gent, Ghent, Belgium
- 1995 Ripple Across The Water, Watari-um Museum, Tokyo, Japan
- 1993 Free Lunch, Centre D’Art Contemporain, Martigny, Switzerland 1993 Under Thirty, Galerie Metropole, Vienna, Austria
- 1993 In Their Own Image, P.S. 1 Museum, Long Island City, New York 1993 FluxAttitudes, The New Museum, New York, NY
- 1991 Home For June, Home for Contemporary Theatre and Art, New York 1990 Summer Group, American Fine Arts Company, New York
- 1987 Infotainment De Selby Gallery, Amsterdam; Gallerie Marie Bonk, Cologne
- 1987 David Carrino, Anne Doran, Cady Noland, Michael Ross, Nature Morte Gallery, New York
- 1982 Real Life Magazine Presents, White Columns, New York
