= Bank Street Arts =

Arts centre in Sheffield, England

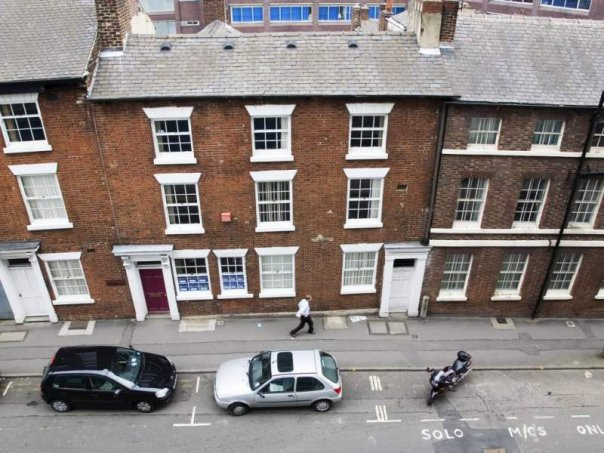
- Established: January 2008
- Location: 32-40 Bank Street, Sheffield, England
- Website: www.bankstreetarts.com

Bank Street Arts (BSA) was a contemporary art centre in Sheffield, South Yorkshire, England. It was established in January 2008, initially as a studio complex for artists. It has grown to include eight public galleries, thirty artist studios and a café.

Based in the Cathedral Quarter, the organisation oversaw the redevelopment of the grade II listed Georgian terrace buildings previously used as lawyers offices. The organisation itself is independent and self-funded.

It has aimed to provide a base for artwork in the local area. As a result, a large proportion of exhibitors reside in the South Yorkshire region. In 2009, the centre opened to the public on a daily basis.

In February 2010, Bank Street Arts became a registered Charity in England and Wales focused on regeneration of the city through artistic means. Registration was removed in November 2018 as the charity ceased to exist.

== Artistic programme ==
The artistic programme comprises the BSA residency scheme and a range of exhibitions alongside the major citywide festivals, including the Sheffield Children's Festival, Galvanise festival, Grin Up North festival and Off the Shelf Festival.
