= Sarah Lasley =

American experimental filmmaker (born 1982)

- Born: 1982 (age 43–44); United States
- Education: Yale School of Art (MFA, 2008)
- Occupations: Filmmaker, educator
- Parents: Tim Lasley (father); Sharon Fraley (mother)
- Website: sarahlasley.com

Sarah Lasley (born 1982) is an American experimental filmmaker and 2026 Guggenheim Fellow. Her no-budget films critique techno-utopianism with absurdist humor.

== Early life and career ==
Sarah Lasley was born in Louisville, Kentucky. She attended the Skowhegan School of Painting and Sculpture. In 2008, she received her Masters of Fine Arts from Yale School of Art where she went on to teach as a Lecturer for many years. Her short film How I Choose to Spend the Remainder of my Birthing Years won the grand prize at the Blue Star Contemporary exhibition "Projection/Projektion" in collaboration with the city of Darmstadt.

The award funded her short film Welcome to the Enclave, starring Brenna Palughi in both leading roles, which went on to screen at Oscar-qualifying festivals such as Slamdance Film Festival, Ann Arbor Film Festival, Athens International Film and Video Festival, Florida Film Festival, and Cucalorus Film Festival before distribution on NoBudge and the Slamdance Channel. The film received the Rotten Tomatoes Audience Award at the Chicago Critics Film Festival and a Jury Prize at the Chicago Underground Film Festival. It received positive reviews on RobertEbert.com and Film Threat.

During her time as an artist in residence at Darmstädter Sezession in Germany, she directed her short film Climate Control, which was made in collaboration with 30 of her students. The film has screened internationally at 25 FPS Festival, London Short Film Festival, Slamdance, Ann Arbor, Big Sky Documentary Film Festival, Athens International Film and Video Festival, and Cucalorus.

She lives in Eureka, California where she is an associate professor at Cal Poly Humboldt.

== Recognition ==
In 2026, she was named a Guggenheim Fellow in Film and Video.
