= Eric Zolov =

American historian and academic

Eric Zolov Prof.
- Occupations: Historian, scholar, author
- Spouse: Terri Gordon-Zolov

Academic background
- Education: B.A., M.A., PhD
- Alma mater: University of Chicago
- Thesis: Containing the Rock Gesture: Mass Culture and Hegemony in Mexico, 1955-1975 (1995)
- Doctoral advisor: John Coatsworth, Friedrich Katz, Michael Geyer, Leora Auslander
- Influences: Jack D. Foner
- Writing career
- Notable works: The Last Good Neighbor: Mexico in the Global Sixties (2020); Refried Elvis: The Rise of the Mexican Counterculture (1999)
- Notable awards: The María Elena Martínez Prize (2021)

Eric Zolov is an American historian, author and academic. He is Professor of History at Stony Brook University where he was the Director of Latin American & Caribbean Studies (2016–19) and Director of Undergraduate Studies (2020–2025). Previously, he taught at Franklin & Marshall College (1998–2011). Zolov is known for his work on the interplay between culture, politics, and international relations in twentieth-century Latin America, particularly during the Cold War era. His first monograph Refried Elvis: The Rise of the Mexican Counterculture was published in 1999 to positive critical acclaim, and was translated and published in Spanish by Norma Editorial. His book The Last Good Neighbor: Mexico in the Global Sixties (2020, Duke University Press) won the 2021 María Elena Martínez Prize in Mexican History by the Conference on Latin American History (CLAH-AHA). Zolov has been a member of the American Historical Association since 2001.

== Biography ==
Zolov graduated with a B.A. in history from Colby College in 1987. He studied at the University of Chicago where he graduated with a dual M.A. in International Relations and Latin American studies in 1990, and a PhD in Latin American History in 1995 under the direction of John Coatsworth, Friedrich Katz, Michael Geyer, and Leora Auslander.

In an interview with Perspectives on History, a magazine published by the American Historical Association, Zolov said that he had never been interested in history or good at memorizing places, names or events, and that having Jack D. Foner teach him a social history course in college ignited his interest in the field. He said he was "hooked by the idea that history offered so much more than knowing “the right answer."

== Career ==
Zolov is currently a Professor of History at Stony Brook University (SUNY). He served as Director of Latin American and Caribbean Studies at Stony Brook University from 2016 to 2019, where he helped expand interdisciplinary programming and strengthen the integration of historical, cultural, and political studies across departments. Before joining Stony Brook, Zolov was a tenured faculty member at Franklin & Marshall College from 1998 to 2011, where he taught courses in Latin American history, modern Mexico, and Cold War studies, contributing to undergraduate education and curriculum development over more than a decade. In addition to his institutional appointments, he has been an active member of the American Historical Association, Conference on Latin American History, Society for Historians of American Foreign Relations, and Society of American Music.

He has contributed to a range of interdisciplinary academic networks focused on Latin American studies, U.S.-Latin American relations, Cold War history, the Global Sixties, and transnational approaches to historical research. From 2010-2011 he contributed a blog on Latin American rock for Alt.Latino.

== Research and scholarly works ==
His scholarly career is defined by his contributions to cultural history, Cold War studies, and transnational approaches to modern Latin American history, with a particular focus on Mexico’s political, cultural, and diplomatic transformations in the twentieth century. His work consistently argues that culture—especially youth movements, music, media, and countercultural expression—is not peripheral but central to understanding political power and historical change. In his first major monograph, Refried Elvis: The Rise of the Mexican Counterculture (1999), Zolov provides a groundbreaking study of Mexican youth culture, rock music, and countercultural politics from the 1960s onward, demonstrating how cultural practices became sites of negotiation, resistance, and identity formation under conditions of state repression and modernization. The book is widely regarded as a foundational text in Mexican cultural history, as it reframed popular culture as a serious analytical lens for understanding modern Mexican society and political consciousness.

His later work extends these cultural concerns into a broader international and diplomatic framework, most notably in The Last Good Neighbor: Mexico in the Global Sixties (2020), where he examines Mexico’s foreign policy during the Cold War and its positioning between U.S. hemispheric influence and emerging Global South solidarities. In this study, Zolov argues that Mexico pursued a distinctive and strategically autonomous diplomatic path, engaging simultaneously with Western powers and Third World networks, thereby challenging conventional narratives that portray Cold War Latin America as politically dependent or passive. This work has been especially influential in reshaping interpretations of Mexico’s role in global Cold War politics and is widely cited in scholarship on transnational diplomacy and Global Sixties history.

Beyond his monographs, Zolov has made extensive contributions through edited volumes and collaborative scholarly projects that further develop themes of cultural politics, music, and U.S.-Latin American relations. Works such as Rockin’ Las Américas: The Global Politics of Rock in Latin/o America (2004) and Fragments of a Golden Age: The Politics of Culture in Mexico Since 1940 (2001) bring together interdisciplinary perspectives on cultural exchange, political identity, and artistic production across the Americas. His journal articles and book chapters similarly explore topics including youth resistance movements, Cold War ideology, cultural diplomacy, and the Mexican state’s relationship with mass culture, contributing to leading debates in Latin American history and global Cold War studies.

In 2021, Zolov's book The Last Good Neighbor: Mexico in the Global Sixties won the María Elena Martínez Prize in Mexican History as the best published book on the history of Mexico published in 2020.

In 2022 Zolov and his wife Terri Gordon-Zolov published The Walls of Santiago: Social Revolution and Political Aesthetics in Contemporary Chile (Berghahn Books, 2022). Zolov and Gordon-Zolov embarked on the project of documenting the Estallido Social in Santiago through photographs, interviews, and research while living in Chile on a Fulbright Fellowship. Initially focusing on graffiti and political graphics, their project expanded to include various forms of public art and performances, culminating in a multi-modal approach including a monograph, an exhibit, an interactive map, and a website. They view their work as a form of scholarship-activism, aiming to translate the significance of the uprising and its artistic expressions to broader audiences, contributing to a larger archival consciousness and historical understanding of the events of 2019–20.

== Awards and honors ==
In 2021, he received the María Elena Martínez Prize in Mexican History (2021), awarded by the Conference on Latin American History (CLAH) of the American Historical Association for his book The Last Good Neighbor: Mexico in the Global Sixties (2020). He is also the recipient of numerous fellowships, including Fulbright (2019, 2001, 1992), Mellon Foundation (1992, 2005), National Endowment for the Humanities (2005, 1992), and the Rockefeller Foundation (2002). In 2026 he was awarded a prestigious Guggenheim Fellowship for a new project that explores Cold War cultural politics and Pan-American relations through the lens of Bossa Nova.

He has been an active member of the American Historical Association since 2001 and has contributed to leadership and service roles within the Conference on Latin American History, including participation in its nominating committee, which helps oversee academic governance and scholarly awards in the field. His broader scholarly standing is also reflected in the extensive citation and reception of his work in Latin American, Cold War, and transnational history studies, where both of his major monographs—Refried Elvis and The Last Good Neighbor—are frequently cited as foundational contributions to cultural and diplomatic history of modern Mexico.

== Bibliography ==
=== Books ===
- Zolov, Eric. The Last Good Neighbor: Mexico in the Global Sixties. Duke University Press, 2020.
- Zolov, Eric. Refried Elvis: The Rise of the Mexican Counterculture. Univ of California Press, 1999.
- Gordon-Zolov, Terri and Eric Zolov. The Walls of Santiago: Social Revolution & Political Aesthetics in Contemporary Chile. Berghahn Books, 2022.

=== Select edited books ===
- Zolov, Eric, ed. Iconic Mexico: An Encyclopedia from Acapulco to Zócalo. ABC-CLIO, 2015.
- Joseph, Gilbert M., Anne Rubenstein, and Eric Zolov, eds. Fragments of a Golden Age: The Politics of Culture in Mexico Since 1940. Duke University Press, 2001.
- Hernandez, Deborah Pacini, Héctor D. Fernández l'Hoeste, and Eric Zolov, eds. Rockin'las Américas: The Global Politics of Rock in Latin/o America. University of Pittsburgh Press, 2004.
- Holden, Robert H., and Eric Zolov, eds. Latin America and the United States: A Documentary History. Oxford University Press, 2011; 2000–.

=== Select book chapters ===
- Zolov, Eric. "Integrating Mexico into the Global Sixties." México Beyond 1968. Revolutionaries, Radicals, and Repression during the Global Sixties and Subversive Seventies (University of Arizona Press 2018): 19–32.
- “Between Bohemianism and a Revolutionary Rebirth: Che Guevara in Mexico” in Paulo Drinot, ed., Che’s Travels: The Making of a Revolutionary in 1950s Latin America (Duke University Press, 2010): 245–282.
- “¡Cuba sí, yanquis no!: The Sacking of the Instituto Cultural México-Norteamericano in Morelia, Michoacán, 1961,” in Gilbert Joseph and Daniela Spenser, eds., In From the Cold: Latin America’s New Encounter with Cold War Studies (Durham: Duke University Press, 2007): 214–252.

=== Select articles ===
- “Marking the Contours of a Mexican New Left in the 1960s," Mexican Studies/Estudios Mexicanos 39:2 (Summer 2023): 185–214.
- “Introduction: Latin America in the Global Sixties,” Introduction to “Special Issue: Latin America in the Global Sixties,” The Americas 70:3 (January 2014): 349–62.
- “Expanding our Conceptual Horizons: The Shift from an Old to a New Left in Latin America,” A Contracorriente 5:2 (Winter 2008): 47–73.
- “Showcasing the ‘Land of Tomorrow’: Mexico and the 1968 Olympics,” The Americas 61:2 (October 2004): 159–88.
- Zolov, Eric. "Toward an Analytical Framework for Assessing the Impact of the 1968 Student Movement on US-Mexican relations." Journal of Iberian and Latin American Research 9, no. 2 (2003): 41–68.

== See also ==
- History of Latin America
