= Pamela Petro =

American author

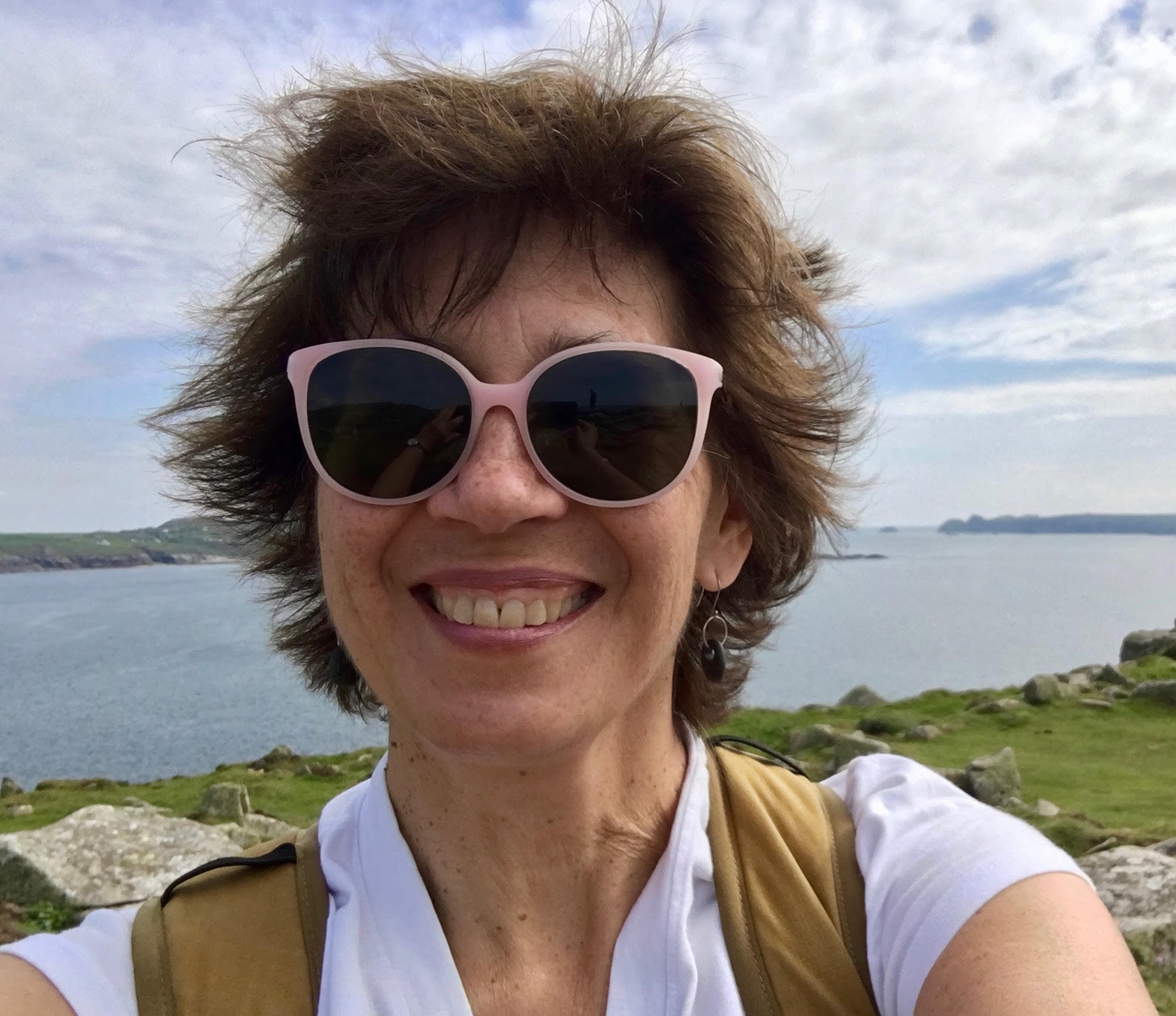
Pamela Petro

Pamela Petro is an author, artist, and educator. Her books, including Travels in an Old Tongue (1996), Sitting up with the Dead (2001, UK, 2002, 2017 US), The Slow Breath of Stone (2005), and The Long Field (2021, UK 2023, US) investigate ideas of place, home, longing, and belonging, using people and places to illuminate and reveal one another. She is interested in the Welsh concept of hiraeth, an intractable longing for someone or something — a home, a culture, a language, or younger self — that’s been left behind or taken away, or has only ever existed in the imagination. Petro’s photography-based visual art explores similar themes in both environmental and word-image installations.

Petro received a Guggenheim Fellowship in General Nonfiction in 2026.

Petro teaches creative nonfiction and graphic novel and comics on Lesley University's MFA in Creative Writing Program and at Smith College, and is co-director of the Dylan Thomas Summer School in Creative Writing at the University of Wales Trinity Saint David.

The Long Field (2021, UK) published by Little Toller, was shortlisted for the Wales Book of the Year 2022.

== Career ==
Petro received her BA from Brown University and MA in Word and Image Studies from St David's University College, now the University of Wales Trinity Saint David.

In 2019 Petro exhibited The Blink of Our Lifetimes: The Ecology of Dusk at the Watson Institute for International and Public Affairs at Brown University.

Co-Writer in Residence with Marguerite Harrison, Spring Creek Project for Ideas, Nature and the Written Word, Oregon State University: Collaborative Residency at the Cabin at Shotpouch Creek, August 2015.

MacDowell Colony Fellow, Fall, 2014; selected as Robert and Stephanie Olmsted Fellow for 2013-14.

Honorary Fellow, University of Wales, Trinity St David, 2014.

In 2011 she was named by the National Park Service as an Artist in Residence at the Grand Canyon, for both writing and photography.

== Awards and Shortlists ==
Pamela Petro received a Guggenheim Fellowship in General Nonfiction in 2026.

The Long Field (2021, UK), published by Little Toller, was a finalist for the Wales Book of the Year 2022.

Financial Times Best Travel Books 2021

A Notable Essay of 2015 in the Best American Essay Series for Flow, (Graphic Essay), Slab Issue No. 9, Spring, 2014.

== Books ==
- The Long Field, 2021 and 2023, UK, Little Toller; 2023, US, Arcade Publishing.
- The Slow Breath of Stone: A Romanesque Love Story, 2005, Fourth Estate
- Sitting Up With The Dead: A Storied Journey Through the American South, 2001, UK, Flamingo; 2002 US and 2nd edition 2017, Arcade Publishing; 2013, Audible edition.
- Travels in an Old Tongue: Touring the World in Welsh, 1997, Flamingo, HarperCollins.

== Essays (Selected) ==
- "Queen of the stone age: my love affair with Wales’ megaliths." The Guardian, 3 October 2021.
- "Cooking Backwards. On becoming a kitchen archivist." Guernica Magazine, 24 May 2021.
- "The AElfgyva Syndrome and Erasure of Women’s Stories." Ms. Magazine, 3 January 2021.
- "Shedding Light. Darkness obscures and sunlight reveals, but dusk—that liminal moment in between—murmurs suggestions." (Graphic Essay), Guernica Magazine, 2 November 2020.
- "Coincidence." The Harvard Review, 22 December 2017.
- "Erosion" (Graphic Essay), Lumina Online Issue No. 3, March 2015.
- "Dreaming in Welsh" The Paris Review Daily, 18 Sept. 2012.

== Comics ==
Strange Bedfellows, a recurring Backpage Comic in The American Scholar, beginning March 2021.
