= Matthew A. Kraft =

American economist

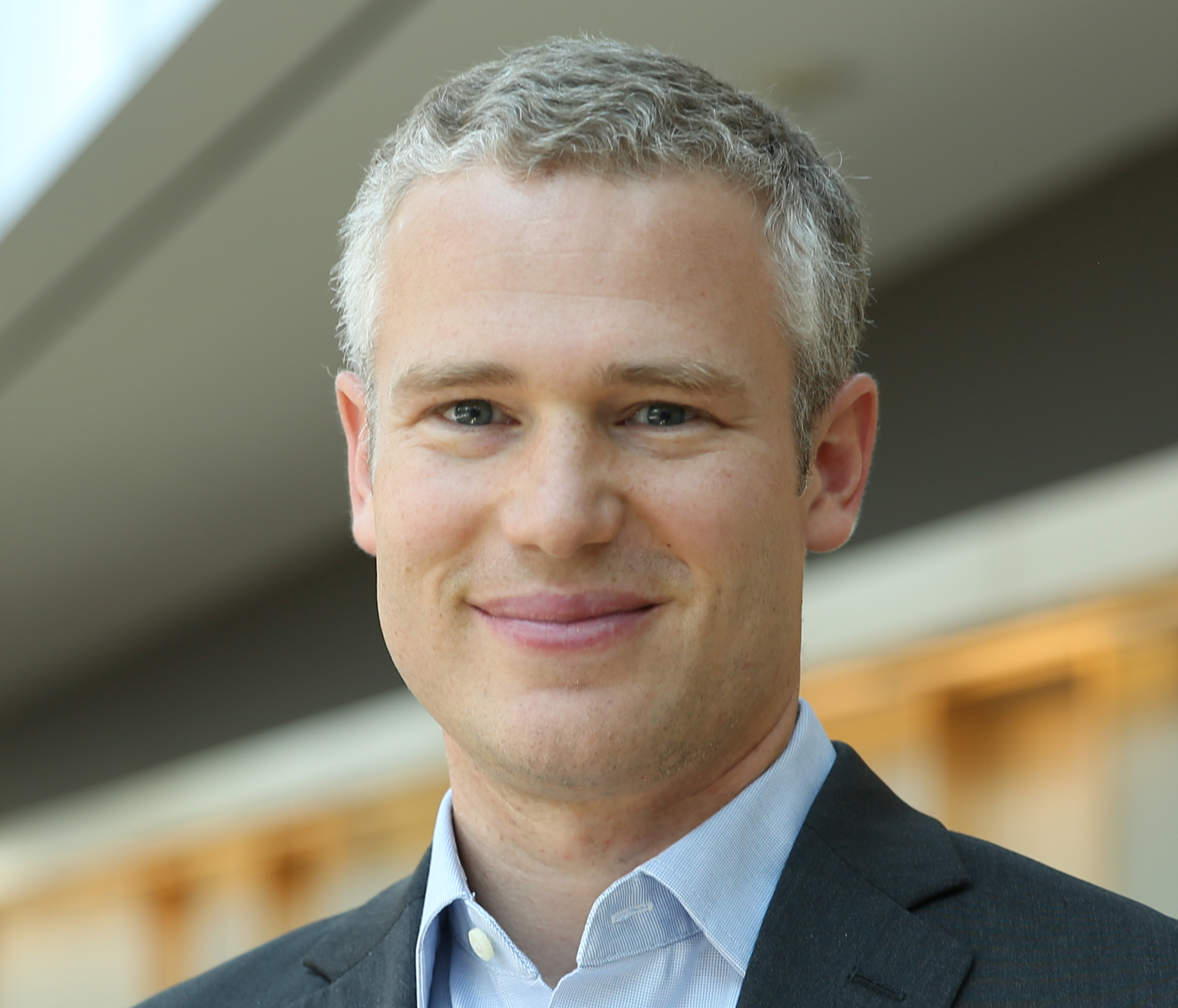
Image of Matthew Kraft

Matthew A. Kraft is an American economist of education, educator, and researcher. He is currently a Professor of Education and Economics at Brown University, a Research Associate at the National Bureau of Economic Research, and a Research Fellow with IZA – Institute of Labor Economics, and a fellow with the American Education Research Association. His primary work focuses on efforts to improve educator and organizational effectiveness in U.S. public schools, particularly in discussions of post-pandemic educator attrition, and has been cited in reporting by The Washington Post, The New Yorker, and The Economist. Kraft also is also the Founder and Faculty Director of SustainableED, an initiative at Brown University focused on advancing research at the intersection of education systems and climate change. From July 2024 to July 2025, he was appointed by the Biden administration to serve as a senior economist at the White House Council of Economic Advisers.

== Biography ==
Between 1999 and 2003, Kraft attended Stanford University where he majored in International Relations with a concentration in Political Economy and earned a master's degree in International Comparative Education. He later worked as a public school teacher in California, including schools at Oakland and Berkeley, where he conducted field work for his master's thesis.

After working as a high school teacher, Kraft pursued an Ed. D. in Quantitative Policy Analysis in Education with a concentration in the Economics of Education at the Harvard Graduate School of Education. In 2013, he joined the Department of Education at Brown University as an assistant professor and is part of the Annenberg Institute. He was a visiting professor at the Universidad Carlos III de Madrid in the spring of 2023.

Currently, Kraft is a Professor of Education and Economics at Brown University, as well as a Research Associate at the National Bureau of Economic Research, a Research Fellow at IZA – Institute of Labor Economics, and Senior Fellow at the Esade Center for Economic Policy in Madrid, Spain. He was recently selected as an American Educational Research Association (AERA) fellow for the 2026 year.

== Professional Achievements ==
Kraft’s scholarship examines efforts to improve teacher hiring, professional development, evaluation, and working conditions; the application of new approaches for interpreting effect sizes; how climate change has affected education; and the development of school-based tutoring and mentoring programs in the wake of the COVID-19 pandemic.

He is the recipient of the 2026 Guggenheim Fellowship, the American Educational Research Association (AERA) Outstanding Public Communication Award, the Society for Educational Effectiveness Early Career Award, the William T. Grant Early Career Scholar Award, the Brown University Dean’s Award for Excellence in Teaching, the Palmer O. Johnson Memorial Award for the most outstanding article across the seven flagship AERA journals, and the National Academy of Education/Spencer Dissertation Fellowship.
