= S1 Artspace =

English nonprofit arts organization

Coordinates: 53.3775°N 1.4754°W

S1 Artspace, in its former premises on Trafalgar Street, Sheffield.

S1 Artspace is a not-for-profit arts organisation based in Sheffield, England, presenting an annual programme of contemporary exhibitions, commissions, screenings and events. S1 Artspace also provides studio space for contemporary artists at varying stages in their careers, from recent graduates to established artists working at an international level.

Over its 28 year history, S1 Artspace has presented work by over 450 artists and accommodated over 150 artists through its studios from Martin Clark, artistic director at Tate St Ives to Haroon Mirza, Northern Art Prize and Silver Lion Award Winner at the 54th Venice Biennale in 2011.

== History ==
S1 Artspace was founded in 1995 (31 years ago) by a group of Sheffield-based artists including Neil Conroy, Steve Dutton, Percy Peacock, Lesley Sanderson and Julie Westerman who were seeking to create a sustainable studio environment in Sheffield City Centre. The organisation evolved under the direction of its artist member base and it continues to adapt in response to shifts in current practice. The project space was initiated through a series of exhibitions organised by the artists at S1 studios who were aiming to provide a platform for new work and ideas.

In 2002, S1 Artspace was awarded a Regional Arts Lottery grant towards developing a pilot programme of exhibitions that led to the appointment of the organisation's first curator, Michelle Cotton, in 2003. In late 2006, Louise Hutchinson took on the role of Curator, continuing to develop the exhibitions programme as well as leading S1 Artspace's relocation to new premises in 2010. S1 Artspace continues to be run under the artistic direction of Louise Hutchinson, with Pippa Shaw, Programme Coordinator and Chloe Reith, Communications & Studios Coordinator.

In 2010, S1 Artspace moved to new larger premises to support a growing commitment to its international exhibition programme. Recent exhibitions include Eva Berendes, People and Events will be the Decoration, solo exhibition commissioned by S1 Artspace, A Three Penny Opera, featuring Mark Wallinger, Cara Tolmie, and 2011 Turner Prize winner, Martin Boyce, and hosted Bloomberg New Contemporaries in September 2011 in collaboration with Site Gallery, Sheffield.

So far in 2012 S1 Artspace has presented a solo exhibition by Jennifer West entitled Aloe Vera & Butter, the 6th S1 SALON film and video screening series, A Peculiar Form of Fiction in collaboration with Sheffield Doc/Fest, and a two-month gallery residency with sculptor Keith Wilson.

== Mission ==
S1 Artspace is a site for production. The organisation supports the production of new work though studio provision, production facilities and an exhibitions programme that has a strong commitment to commissioning new work. Previous commissions include solo exhibitions with Haegue Yang, Eva Berendes, Jennifer West, George Henry Longly, Giles Round, Sean Edwards, and Pil and Galia Kollectiv.

== S1 Studios ==
S1 Members Show 2011, Installation Shot, S1 Artspace

S1 Artspace is the only studio and gallery organisation in Yorkshire to commit all of its artists's studios to contemporary fine art practice. Facilities include an open-access wood workshop, arts library and reading room. The studio complex is based on an open plan layout to encourage and sustain a committed community of artists and to act as a platform for critical exchange, dialogue and collaboration.

Current studio members include James Clarkson, Jamie Crewe, Joseph Cutts, Natalie Finnemore, Jerome Harrington, Jim Howieson, Hannah Knights, David McLeavy, Charlotte A. Morgan, Emily Musgrave, Jade Richardson, and Roanna Wells.

S1 Artspace runs a Bursary Studio programme in connection with Sheffield Hallam University through which the organisation supports four graduates with an annual six-month programme of mentoring and subsidised studio space, culminating in a group exhibition. S1 Artspace also provides studio spaces for Sheffield Hallam University Fine Art Practice Phd students.

S1 Artspace has been praised recently in the national press for providing low cost studio spaces for artists and has been described as 'the hub of the burgeoning art scene in the Steel City’ by The Guardian and as 'integral [to] supporting young artists to international success' by The Independent

== Exhibition History ==
1997–1995
S1 Specs
Testing (one), testing (two), testing (three)
Depot
Art in the Window

1999
Line - Conroy / Sanderson
Keeping my Head Above Water - Julie Westerman
Marks Out of 10
Interstellar
Haunted

2000
Vim & Vigour
Untitled until Titled

2001
Static
Happy Home
Home

2002
Introduction:
Patrick Ward
Christopher Brown
Gayle Wilson

2003
S1/Salon 2003/4
Alternative Action Plan
Art Sheffield 03

2004
Crystal Peaks
Heather & Ivan Morison
fwd
The Burgundy Leisure Awards
Tonight We Are Golden

2005
Art Sheffield 05: Spectator T
S1 Members' Show
we live in this concrete basin
Karla Black | Babak Ghazi
S1/Salon 2005

2006
S1 Members Show
James Pyman
Sean Edwards
her private theatre
S1/Salon 2006

2007
S1 Members Show
George Henry Longly
Torsten Lauschmann
Where Something Becomes Nothing
S1/Salon 2007
Everything is so much bigger than us

2008
S1 Members Show
Pil and Galia Kollectiv
George Henry Longly UK Tour
Make Shift
Katy Woods
Art Sheffield 08: Yes No & Other Options

2009
Giles Round
S1 / Salon 2009 Tour
Kim Coleman & Jenny Hogarth
Sound Spill
S1/Salon 2009

2010
FIFTEEN
Showcase
Ersatz Objects
Haegue Yang - Art Sheffield Festival 2010: Life: A User's Manual

2011
S1 Members Show 2011
Bloomberg New Contemporaries 2011
S1 INTRODUCES
A Threepenny Opera
Eva Berendes - People & Events Will Be The Decoration

2012
A Peculiar Form of Fiction
S1 / Salon 2012
Ian Anderson / The Designers Republic - Atoms Vectors Pixels Ghosts
Jennifer West - Aloe Vera & Butter
