= Yorkshire ArtSpace =

Art studio space in Sheffield, England

Coordinates: 53.377°N 1.466°W

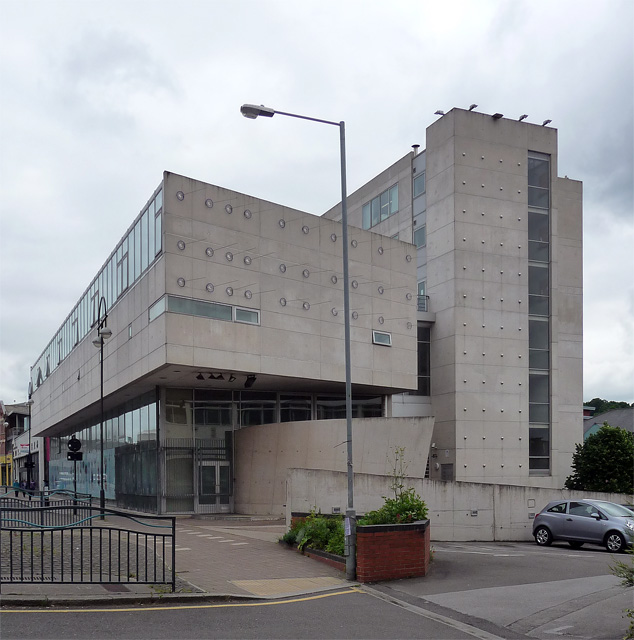
Persistence Works, site of Yorkshire ArtSpace

Yorkshire ArtSpace is a project established to provide studio space for artists which opened in October 2001 at the Persistence Works building in Sheffield, South Yorkshire, England. It occupies a key site at the termination of Furnival Street, forming a main elevation to Brown Street, the main street of the city's Cultural Industries Quarter.

The Yorkshire ArtSpace Society, originally established in Sheffield in 1977 by a group of artists, aimed to provide accessible studio space (a full list of those artists is unknown, two were Michael O'Kane and John Wood). At that time, the Society was based at Washington Works, but only on a short-term lease. Subsequently, in 1982 a 10-year lease was obtained on Sydney Works, on Matilda Street, a four-storey building which had formerly been a cutlery factory. After eight years of development the premises had been modified to include 30 studios with office and gallery space. It was the first arts organisation to move into this part of the City centre, later to become the Cultural Industries Quarter. The Society became the largest "artspace" in the country outside London.

Persistence Works was designed by Feilden Clegg Bradley Studios. It is the UK's first purpose-built studio complex for artists and craftspeople. The project has created studio space for sixty eight practising artists and craftspeople in addition to exhibition, project, education and office spaces, The building won an RIBA Yorkshire White Rose award and a Civic Trust Award Commendation. It was also a finalist in the Prime Ministers’ Better Public Building Awards in 2002.
