= 2014 Moscow school shooting =

Mass shooting and hostage taking in Moscow, Russia

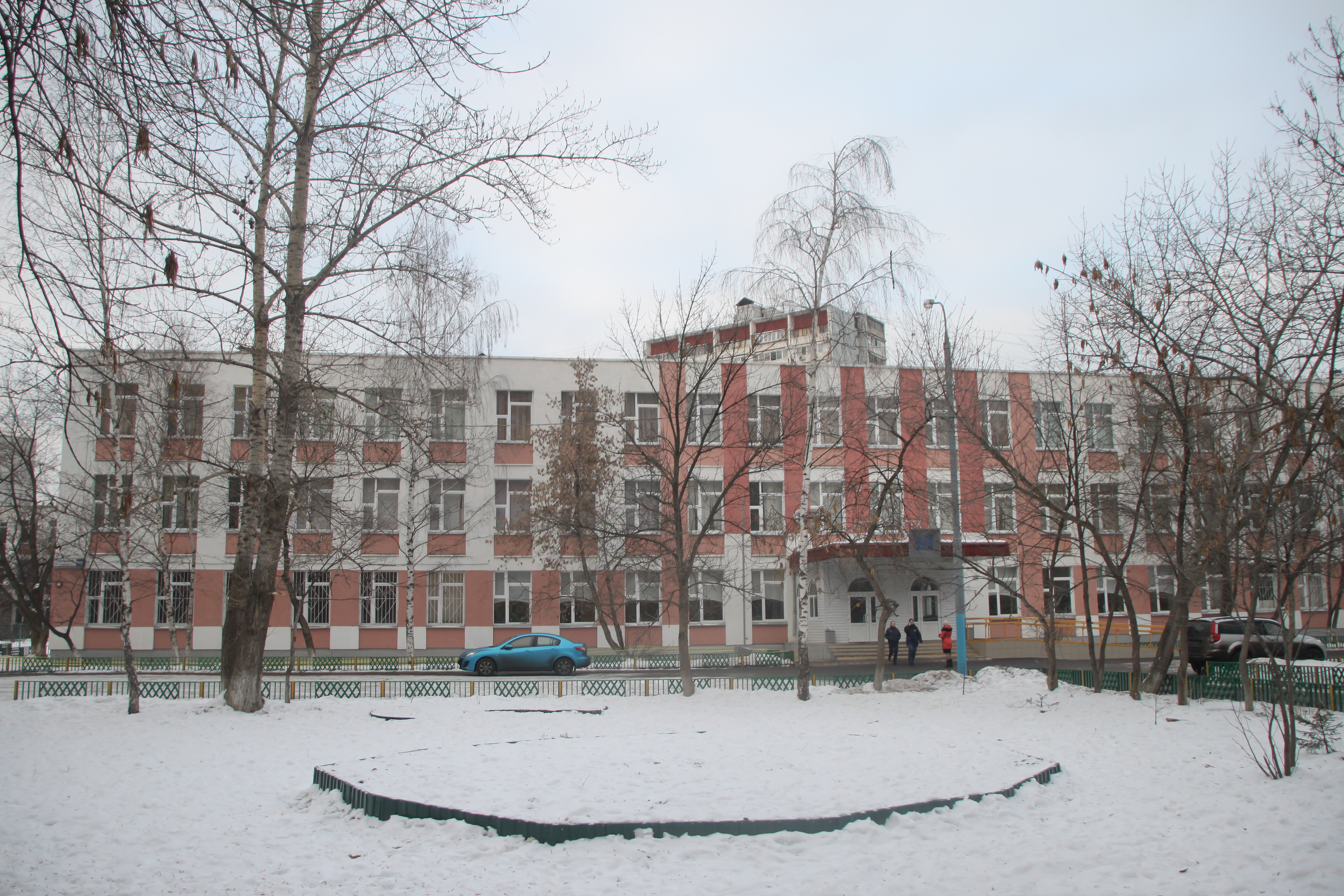
- School No. 263, the site of the shooting, on 4 February
- Location: 55°51′25″N 37°36′51″E; School No. 263 in Otradnoye District, Moscow, Russia
- Date: 3 February 2014; 12 years ago 11:40 a.m. – 1:05 p.m. (UTC+03:00)
- Attack type: Mass shooting, hostage taking
- Weapons: Browning 22 Semi-Auto rifle; 7.62×51mm NATO Tikka T3 bolt action rifle (unused); Dagger (unused)
- Deaths: 2
- Injuries: 1
- Perpetrator: Sergey Gordeyev
- Motive: Mental disorder; Solipsism; Suicidal ideation

On 3 February 2014, a school shooting occurred at School No. 263 in the Otradnoye District of Moscow, Russia. 15-year-old pupil Sergey Gordeyev, armed with a rifle, killed his geography teacher and held his classmates as hostages, before opening fire on first responders who arrived at the scene, killing a policeman and severely wounding a patrolman. In the following negotiations led by the perpetrator's father, the teenager released the hostages and was detained.

In September 2014, when the trial for the shooting case began in the Moscow's Butyrsky District Court, Gordeyev's defence team asserted that he was insane, and the state prosecution concurred. On March 3, 2015, the court sent Gordeyev to compulsory psychiatric treatment.

Despite the opposition from the victims' defence, the Moscow City Court declared in August 2015 that the decision was lawful. In November 2015, the Presidium of the Moscow City Court referred the matter to the Moscow District Military Court for reconsideration, and Gordeyev was again ruled insane on February 8, 2016.

The incident, which was the third fatal school shooting to occur in modern Russia, received wide resonance in Russian society and sparked debate regarding security systems in educational institutions, as well as the negative impact of films, television shows and video games containing scenes of violence.

== Perpetrator ==
Sergey Viktorovich Gordeyev (Note: Russian: Сергей Викторович Гордеев), a 15-year-old pupil of School No. 263 born on 4 October 1998 in Moscow, was identified as the shooter. A successful student of Class 10A, Gordeyev was aiming to graduate school with a gold medal and preparing to enroll into the Moscow Engineering Physics Institute. He was not known to any law enforcement agencies.

Since childhood, he was physically active and attended sambo lessons. He was also fond of video games, including Grand Theft Auto V, which he said had beneficial effects on him, because thanks to them he could be "distracted from the world and could distract himself from his grievances”.

Gordeyev's father, Viktor, was an employee of the Federal State Budgetary Institution Research Institute, supervised by law enforcement agencies. He had to resign from the service following the shooting. Together with his father, visited shooting ranges, where his father taught him how to shoot firearms. Gordeyev was a member of the "Vystrel" shooting club, and according to the testimony of one of the instructors, he shot "average" compared to professionals, but much better than any ordinary person. Gordeyev's mother, Irina, worked as an accountant and his grandmother, Lyubov Ivanovna, was a member of the class' parents' committee. Their family also includes a younger son, Ivan. It was previously reported that the Gordeyev's father and grandfather worked in state security agencies, but the FSB denied this information.

In an interview with Metro International, one of Gordeyev's classmates said that he had virtually no friends: "I would find it difficult to call him calm. That's not even the point. He was kind of strange, not like everyone else. He did not communicate with many people. It's hard to communicate with such people, in my opinion. Lately he's been sending me videos about weapons on VKontakte".

=== Mental state and motivations ===
I didn't want to kill anyone, I wanted to die. I was interested in finding out what would happen after? What is there - after death? I also wanted to see how people would react to what I was doing. I came to kill myself. I had no conflicts with Andrei Nikolaevich, on the contrary - we had a good relationship. When he came at me, I shot him - I don't even know why, maybe because no one would believe that I could shoot?

— An excerpt from Gordeyev's interview with Izvestia, published on 8 February, 2014

According to Gordeyev's defense, he was insane at the time the crime was committed. During interrogations, he confessed that he was driven to commit the crime in order to prove the theory of solipsism to his classmates and then commit suicide. At the age of ten, Gordeyev began to think that "life has no meaning, that the world is an illusion, a dream".

Vladimir Levin, the Gordeyev's lawyer, told journalists about his client: "He thinks that he has invented us all, that now he will close his eyes, and all those who are not interesting to him will disappear. He told his own mother that she was his illusion." Additionally, Levin had said that Gordeyev opened fire on the police because he was afraid that they would prevent him from proving his theory.

According to the victim's defense, he may have suffered from a mental disorder. However, the kind of disorder that did not deprive him of full or partial awareness of the actual nature and social repercussions of his actions. The defense argued that he was pushed to commit the crime, which he had planned in advance, caused by conflicts with his parents, teachers and classmates. Minister of Education Dmitry Livanov, however, claimed that Gordeyev did not have conflicts with students and teachers, the teenager himself noted in his testimony that there were conflicts, but they happened rarely, and in general relations in the class were friendly. If conflicts did arise, they were on domestic grounds or during an argument.

In conversation with his lawyer, Gordeyev told him about the conflict that occurred the day before the incident between Gordeyev, Russian language teacher Tatyana Babkina, and the principal, in which the principal was forced to call the school psychologist in order to calm Gordeyev, who had already begun to make threats. A video recording of a fight involving Gordeyev and his classmate, Aleksandr Petrov, appeared online, and according to the victim's defense, was presumably made several months before the shooting. Sergey's mother subsequently expressed opinion that this video was filmed while Gordeyev was in the 8th grade.

Tatyana Babkina, who taught Russian language and literature for Class 10A, spoke of Gordeyev as a kind, sympathetic and non-confrontational teenager. In an interview with LifeNews, Babkina told she was present during Gordeyev's interrogation at his request, saying:" We often discussed the topic of good and evil – I taught children mercy, and he said that it did not exist. When I told him that there are more kind people, he laughed." Shortly after the shooting Gordeyev said he wanted to "show her that she is wrong". According to media reports which appeared almost immediately after the incident, Gordeyev allegedly had a conflict with the killed teacher Andrei Kirillov over his grades.

On 8 February 2014, Gordeyev, while held in pretrial detention, was visited by a member of the Moscow Public Monitoring Commission and an actress Olga Dibtseva. According to Dibtseva, Gordeyev claimed that he did not want to kill anyone; when he entered the classroom with a gun, the teacher and the children did not believe that "he would be able to shoot".

== Shooting ==
On Sunday, 2 February 2014, Gordeyev decided to commit the crime. He planned to come to school with a weapon, tell his classmates about his views on the theory of solipsism, and then commit suicide. That evening, he found out where his father hid the keys to the gun safe. He also sent some of his classmates SMS messages with the words “tomorrow you will be surprised at what I will do”.

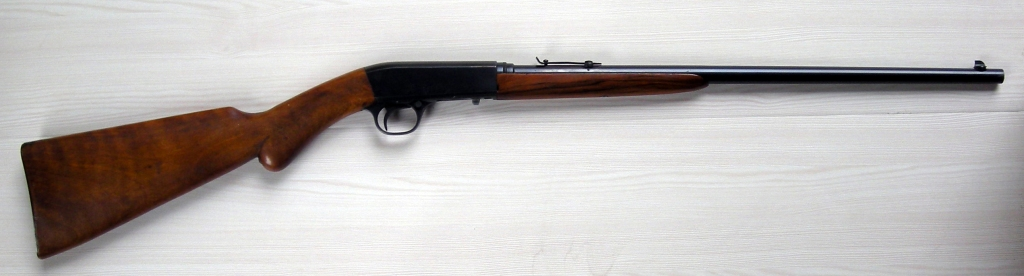
A Browning SA-22, Gordeyev stole his father's model of this rifle and later used it to kill geography teacher Andrei Kirillov.

On the morning of 3 February, Gordeyev lied to his parents that the first three lessons of the day were not being held, so that they would leave home and he could freely access the weapons. To make the lie more convincing, he had asked a classmate to send him an SMS message regurgitating the lie. Around that time, Gordeyev wrote a poem in English, in which he stated that he was tired of life and could "no longer live in fear". After his parents left, Gordeyev opened the safe and took out a .22 long Browning SA-22, a 7.62×51mm NATO Tikka T3 bolt action rifle with an optical sight, ammunition and a dagger which he found in the house. Before he put the weapons in cases, he used one of the rifles to fire a test shot through an open window. In order to conceal the weapons, Gordeyev wore a black fur coat with long flags which belonged to his mother.

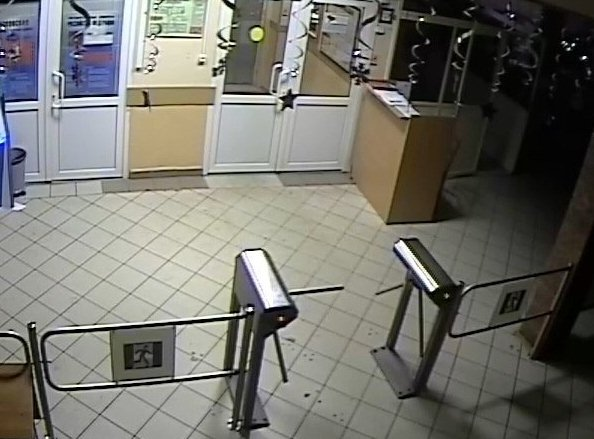
Gordeyev entered the lobby of School No. 263, pictured in 2016, and threatened a security guard before opening fire in Room No. 2

Gordeyev left his house on Berezovaya Alley and around 11:40 a.m., approximately 10 minutes after the start of the fourth class, approached the central entrance, where he removed the weapons from their cases. He passed the turnstile at the entrance and threatened the security guard, he went to the first floor of the building and approached Room No. 2, where Class 10A had a geography class. Through the open door, Gordeyev, using the SA-22, shot the teacher Andrei Kirillov in the head and then pointed the gun at the students, amounted to around 20. Gordeyev, standing in front of the class, shared his thoughts on the theory of solipsism; his beliefs that only he existed in the world, and life was an illusory dream. At some point, he noticed that the wounded Kirillov began to show signs of life, and shot him in the head a second time, killing him.

=== Emergency response ===
The security guard called the police by pressing the school's panic button. The police received the alarm at 11:46, and about four minutes later a Non-Department Security of the National Guard squad arrived at the school. Warrant Officer Sergei Bushuyev and Warrant Officer Oleg Nurgaliev headed for Room No. 2, and Bushuyev tried to enter the room, at which point Gordeyev opened fire and wounded him. Nurgaliev immediately called an ambulance, but Bushuyev died from his wounds before the medics arrived.

Subsequently, the Post and Patrol Service of the Ministry of Internal Affairs arrived at the scene, and Gordeyev opened fire on the patrolmen from the window. After police entered the building, Senior Sergeant Vladimir Krohin saw the body of the dead warrant officer Bushuyev and stopped ten meters down the corridor diagonally from the classroom, at which point Gordeyev shot him through a crack in the half-open door. Krohin's partner, Junior Lieutenant Vyacheslav Nechayev Nechayev, risked his life by carrying his partner out from Gordeyev's view and dragging him around the corner.

At 12:12, several ambulance crews and two fire brigades arrived at the school, an air ambulance of the Russian Emergencies Ministry landed on the site next to the school, which subsequently evacuated the wounded officer Vladimir Krokhin on a stretcher at approximately 12:15. The school grounds were cordoned off by police, and the "Hurricane-2" plan was initiated, allowing security forces to use deadly force in the event the hostages lives get endangered during their release. Moreover, Mayor of Moscow Sergey Sobyanin, Minister of Internal Affairs Vladimir Kolokoltsev, Minister of Education Dmitry Livanov and Head of the Investigative Committee of Russia Alexander Bastrykin arrived at the scene.

According to eyewitnesses, Gordeyev talked to the hostages about death, his life, and family problems. He took phone calls from his parents several times, and after the helicopter landed, fired about 6 shots into the window. According to the Russian Ministry of Internal Affairs, during his time in the classroom, Gordeyev fired at least 11 shots, and according to his own confessions, made later during a psychiatric examination, 18 shots.

By 12:30, the majority of students in the school were evacuated. Throughout the evacuation, Gordeyev remained in the classroom with the hostages. At 12:17, Gordeyev's father was called in by special forces to negotiate with his son. He put on a bulletproof vest, entered Room No. 2, and persuaded his son to let his classmates go and surrender. Gordeyev released hostages at about 12:48, and a few minutes later, medics managed to move the body of the murdered teacher to the cloakroom on the first floor. Around 13:05, the shooter was taken out of the school by SOBR fighters.

== Victims ==
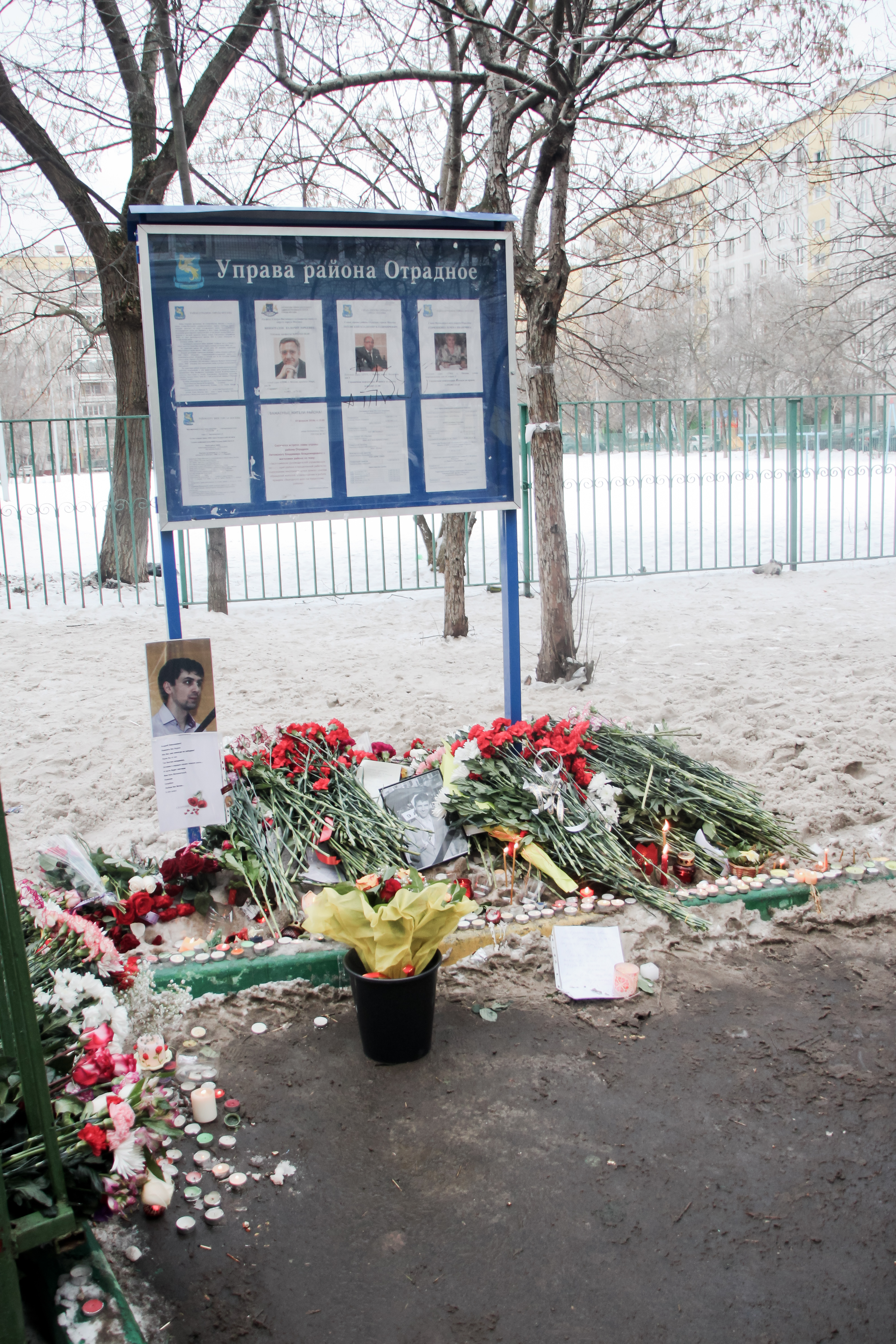
Improvised memorial at the school the day after, dedicated to the victims

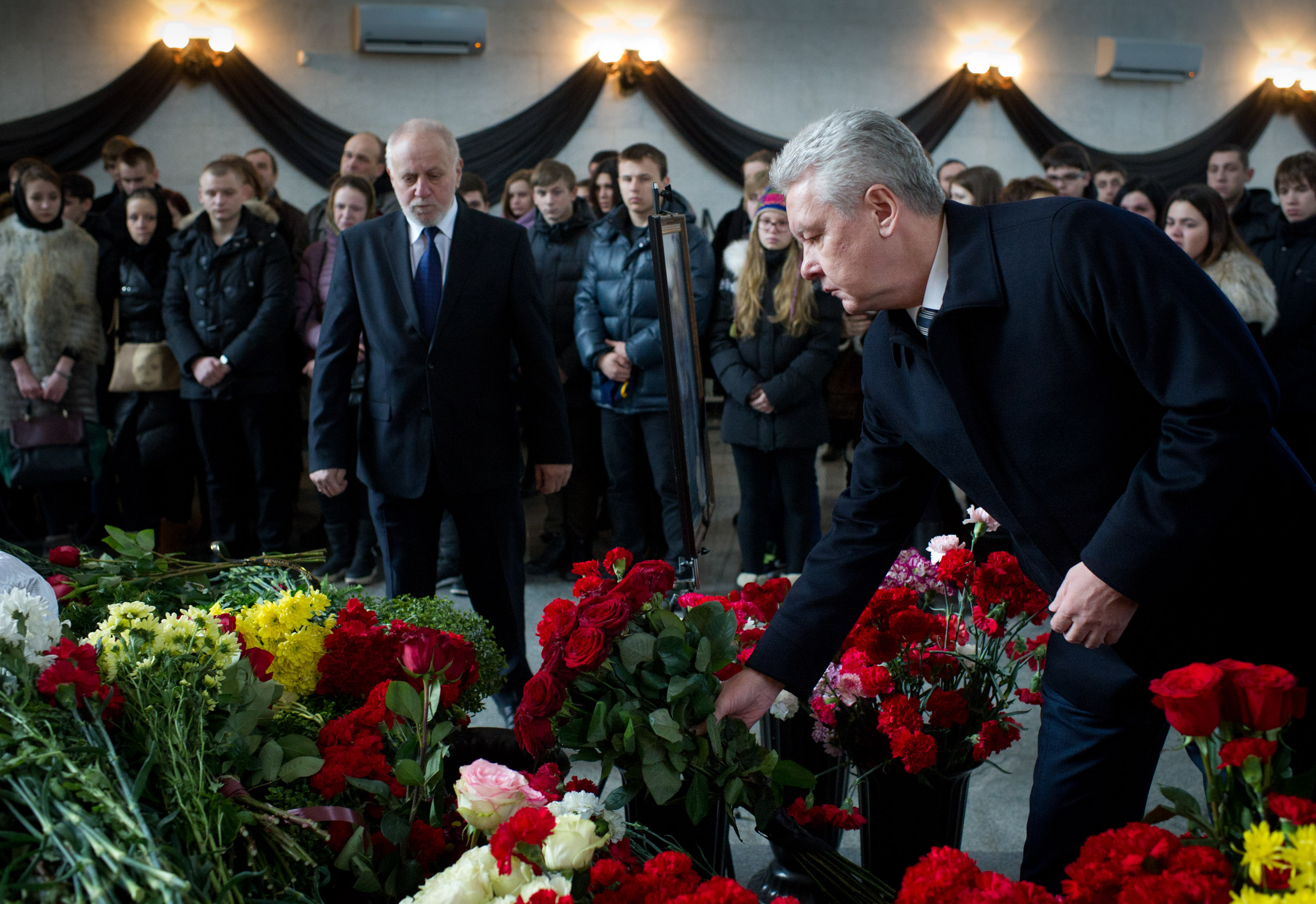
Memorial service on 6 February for the victims of the shooting, attended by Mayor of Moscow Sergey Sobyanin

The shooting left two people dead, a teacher of the school and a first responding policeman, additionally another emergency officer was left wounded but survived their injuries. The first victim was geography teacher Andrei Nikolaevich Kirillov. He was born in 1984 in the Vadsky District of the Nizhny Novgorod Region. After graduating from high school, he entered the Arzamas Pedagogical Institute, which he graduated from in 2006, and subsequently served in the Russian Armed Forces. Following his military career, he taught geography and biology in the senior grades of Secondary School No. 263. He was married and raised a son.

The second victim was Warrant Officer Sergei Viktorovich Bushuev, a policeman in a platoon of the 1st Police Battalion of the Non-Department Security of the National Guard for the North-Eastern Administrative District. The bullet fired by Gordeyev pierced the policeman's artery and entered his chest; Bushuev died from profuse bleeding. Before the incident, he had served in the internal affairs agencies since 1994, and in the battalion since 1997. While on service, he was awarded the departmental badges of the Ministry of Internal Affairs. He was married and had a daughter.

The wounded person, Senior Sergeant Vladimir Aleksandrovich Krohin, served at the Post and Patrol Service of the Ministry of Internal Affairs. He was born in 1984 and has been in the internal affairs agencies since December 2005, earning the "For Distinction in Service" badge and a number of honorary certificates. Krohin was taken to the Sklifosovsk Institute for Emergency Medicine with extensive blood loss caused by wounds to the chest, diaphragm, liver, stomach, pancreas and also a wound to the inferior venae cavae. He underwent treatment and was released in April.

=== Honours ===
On 6 February 2014, Vladimir Putin signed a decree to award Kirillov, Bushuev, and Krohin the Order of Courage for "courage and selflessness shown in the performance of official and civic duty during the tragedy on February 3 at School No. 263 in Moscow". Kirillov and Bushuev received it posthumously, while Krohin was awarded in May 2014 by the Head of the Main Directorate of the Ministry of Internal Affairs of Moscow, Anatoly Yakunin.

On 22 December 2016, a memorial plaque was ceremoniously unveiled in memory of Bushuev at Moscow School No. 1411, where he previously studied. The ceremony was attended by Bushuev's relatives, representatives of the North-Eastern Administrative District Department of Internal Affairs, representatives of the Interdistrict Department of Non-Departmental Security of the Federal Service of National Guard Troops for Moscow, as well as veterans of the internal affairs agencies and students of the school.

== Investigation ==
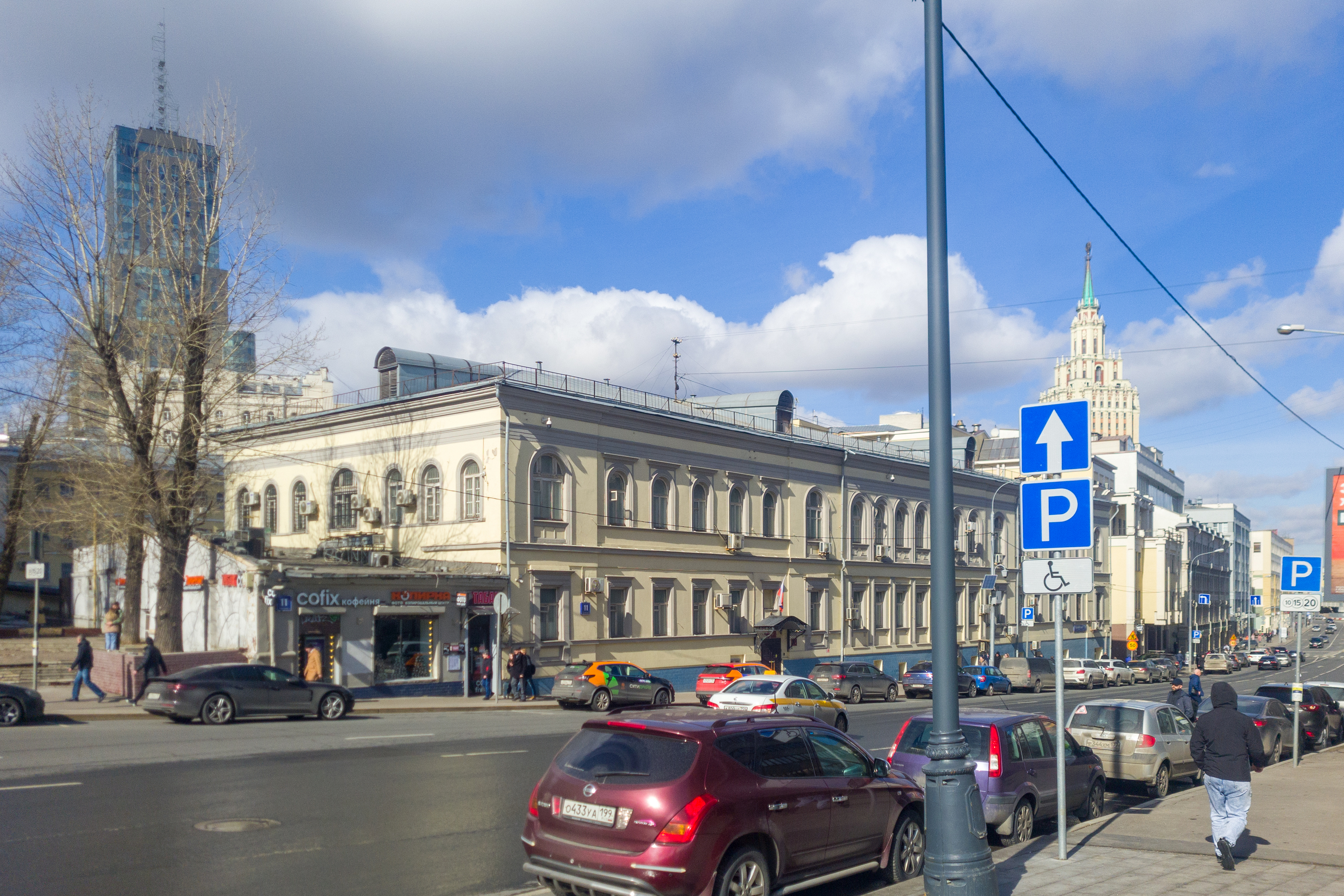
The first hearing regarding the shooting was held at the Basmanny District Court, pictured in 2023.

On 4 February 2014, Gordeyev was taken to the Basmanny District Court for a preliminary hearing to choose preventive measures against him. He was brought into the courtroom wearing a black balaclava, and the hearing was held behind closed doors due to the suspect's juvenile status. The court satisfied the motion put out by the investigation deciding to keep Gordeyev in custody for the next two months, declining his petition to remain under the supervision of his parents. Gordeyev's father and mother did not attend the court hearing.

On 12 February 2014, Gordeyev was charged. The investigation was conducted by employees of the Main Investigation Department of the Investigative Committee of Russia. They ordered a forensic psychiatric examination, while employees of the Federal Drug Control Service of Russia examined Gordeyev's blood tests and established that he did not use narcotic substances.

Initially, Gordeyev was held in a temporary detention facility of the North-Eastern District Department of Internal Affairs, where he was held in a cell with an adult man who, as his lawyer claimed, was accused of "not particularly serious crimes". There were no problems between the two, and Gordeyev did not make any complaints about his cellmate. Shortly thereafter, he was transferred to the a pre-trial youth detention center No. 5 "Vodnik". While incarcerated, Gordeyev asked to arrange a meeting with his parents.

In April 2014, Gordeyev completed the forensic psychiatric examination in the Serbsky State Scientific Center for Social and Forensic Psychiatry, which concluded that Gordeyev was insane and diagnosed him with paranoid schizophrenia. Subsequently, he was transferred to a specialized psychiatric department of the Butyrka prison. According to a source in law enforcement agencies for the Izvestia newspaper, even at the preliminary stage of the examination it was possible to identify a mental disorder in Gordeyev, including abnormal hyperactive behavior, which was reflected in his inability to lie down and sleep; constantly on the move and conflicting with other patients.

On 22 August, 2014, the criminal case on the shooting was sent to the Butyrsky District Court under the signature of Deputy Prosecutor General Viktor Grin. The court received the case on 25 August.

== Legal proceedings ==
=== Trial ===
On September 8 2014, the trial began. During the first session, the state prosecutor asked to impose mandatory medical measures against the defendant and announced his partial admission of guilt. Gordeyev recognised some of his guilt but disagreed with the way the crime was classified.

On 15 October, Gordeyev suffered a cramp in his neck during his transportation to the second hearing. The victims' lawyer, Igor Trunov, told the media that Gordeyev had taken an antidepressant, which has seizures as a side effect. The court called for an ambulance to administer an anticonvulsant injection to the defendant.

In January 2015, the plaintiff party requested the court to acknowledge Gordeyev's psychological and psychiatric evaluation as unlawful and containing signs of falsification. According to the victims' petition, the expert's conclusion was questionable, the victims were not quickly notified of the decision to appoint the examination, and the procedural order of appointment and execution of the examination was violated. After refusing to perform a repeat assessment, the Butyrsky Court ordered that the Serbsky Institute specialists who performed the examination be questioned, partially granting the victims' attorney's request for a second forensic mental examination of the defendant.

On 11 February 2015, another court hearing was held, where the completion of the judicial investigation of the case was announced. The court acknowledged the presence of violations in the examination and issued a ruling, shared privately with the investigator.

On 24 February, the court extended Gordeyev's detainment until 25 May, and the next day the parties debated. The prosecution asked the court to declare the teenager insane and send him for compulsory treatment. In addition, the prosecutor asked the court to reclassify the charge from article 206 of the Criminal Code of Russia (hostage taking) to a less serious one, article 127 (illegal deprivation of liberty). Gordeyev's defense asked to reclassify the murder charge to the charge of manslaughter. According to Trunov, Gordeyev did not say anything in his final statement.

==== Verdict and appeal ====
On 3 March 2015, a scheduled hearing on the case was held in the Butyrsky Court, which issued a decision that Gordeyev, being insane, had committed a murder and an attempted murder. He was sent for compulsory psychiatric treatment for a period of at least 6 months, afterwards his mental state could be re-examined. The court also ordered to cease criminal prosecution against Gordeyev due to the absence of corpus delicti for the hostage taking case, and at the same time his actions could not be re-qualified on the charge of illegal deprivation of liberty due to the defendant's minor age. The operative part of the verdict was announced by federal judge Yulia Shelepova. Gordeyev listened to the decision in silence, and after it was announced said that the court's decision was clear to him. According to the Gordeyev's lawyer, Vladimir Levin, the court's decision was expected. In an interview, he also said that he talked to Gordeyev following the announcement of the verdict, and Gordeyev said that he "did not understand anything".

The victims' side expressed a desire to challenge the court's decision due to "categorical disagreement" with the outcome. The representative of the victims' side, Igor Trunov, believed that the case struggled from selfish "interest and corruption". On 11 March 2015, the victims' party appealed the decision with the Moscow District Military Court. In the appeal, Trunov requested another trial headed by a different panel of judges, and asked the court to overturn the Butyrsky Court decision. In his opinion, the court had erroneously concluded that it was possible to trust the psychiatric examination report regarding Gordeyev.

On 16 April, the plaintiff filed a complaint addressed to the chairperson of the Moscow City Court, Olga Egorova, regarding the judge's inaction and a claim for compensation regarding the deadlines' violation. Trunov drew attention to the fact that one and a half months had passed since the case hearing, but the minutes of the court hearing had still not been prepared and provided for review to the plaintiff.

On 10 August, the Moscow City Court considered the complaint of the plaintiff and found the decision of the Butyrsky Court to be lawful. Gordeyev was sent to a psychiatric clinic. In September, the plaintiff filed an appeal to the Presidium of the Moscow City Court against the ruling of the Butyrsky District Court of 3 March 2015 and the appellate ruling of the Moscow City Court of August 10 2015.

=== Second trial ===
On 13 November, the Presidium of the Moscow City Court overturned the decision of the Butyrsky District Court of 3 March 2015, and sent the case to the Moscow District Military Court for judicial review. At the same time, the court refused the defendant's request to hold a closed trial, as well as to suspend the claim until the case against Gordeyev was formed. On 23 December, a panel of three judges began reviewing the case at the Moscow District Military Court. The defendant filed a motion asking for recusal of the state prosecutor, as he had participated in the case during its first hearing, but the court rejected the motion. Gordeyev's lawyer did not appear at the hearing, so the hearing continued the next day. On 25 December, the court questioned three victims, including the mother and wife of the deceased Andrei Kirillov, as well as police officer Vladimir Krokhin.

In early January 2016, it became known that the plaintiff had appealed to the Qualification Collegium of Judges of Moscow with a demand to bring a list of judges and prosecutors connected with the case to disciplinary action. The complaint noted that one of the judges "repeatedly appeared in court and conducted trials without a robe" and that another, during an appellate court hearing, spoke to the victim Kirillova "in a disdainful, rude manner", responding to comments "aggressively and rudely". During subsequent hearings, Gordeyev testify independently without his lawyer, as he had done before. At the hearing on 18 January, 2016, he provided clarifications regarding the autopsy results of Kirillov and Bushuev, admitting that he had killed them, but could not articulate a motive.

On 20 January, LifeNews published a video recording made in the school cloakroom, which showed Gordeyev's classmate Alexander Petrov punching and kicking Gordeyev to the cheers of other kids. On 26 January, the defense of the plaintiff filed a motion to prosecute Petrov for perjury. According to lawyers, during the preliminary investigation of the case Petrov knowingly gave false testimony, claiming that he and Sergey had good friendly relations; at the court hearing on 22 January 2016, he had also stated that he had no conflicts with the defendant.

On 5 February, the Moscow District Military Court initiated the final debates between parties. The state prosecutor asked the court to impose compulsory medical measures on Gordeyev, while the plaintiff disagreed with the prosecution's position and once again insisted on the defendant's sanity and demanded a longer sentence. The plaintiff also asked the court to issue a private ruling to the Ministry of Internal Affairs stating that at the time of the shooting incident the police force displayed unprofessionalism and "endangered not only their own lives, but also the lives of the schoolchildren who were held hostage at that time". On 8 February 2016, the Moscow District Military Court ruled to exempt Gordeyev from liability and send him to a hospital for compulsory treatment. The ruling was announced by presiding judge Sergei Korobchenko. As the decision was announced, the mother of Kirillov left the courtroom. The victims' lawyer Igor Trunov stated that the ruling would be appealed by the victims' defense in the appellate procedure.

On 16 February, it became known that the plaintiff filed an appeal to the Judicial Collegium for Military Personnel of the Supreme Court of Russia, challenging the decision of the Moscow District Military Court. On 5 May, the Supreme Court of Russia recognized the decision of the Moscow District Military Court of 8 February 2016 as lawful. In early September 2016, the plaintiff filed a complaint to the European Court of Human Rights, which claimed that "the fundamental principles of the Convention for the Protection of Human Rights and Freedoms were violated during the investigation and consideration of the criminal case in court".

Gordeyev underwent compulsory treatment at the Smolensk Psychiatric Hospital for Adolescents. In 2017, according to Igor Trunov, Gordeyev was transferred to outpatient treatment, after which he returned to Moscow. Additionally, he was assigned a disability and received monthly benefits, paying a portion of it, one thousand rubles, for the care of the adolescent son of Kirillov. In January 2020, the plaintiff appealed to the Prosecutor General's Office of Russia with a demand to verify the legality of the killer's transfer to outpatient treatment.

=== Civil proceedings ===
At the very first court hearing, Gordeyev's classmates renounced any material claims against him and his parents, and Senior Sergeant Krohin, who had already received compensation during the pre-trial stage, also renounced his claims in the civil proceedings. The relatives of Kirillov filed a civil suit against the teenager for a total of 9 million rubles. In addition, the victims demanded the defendant to provide the teacher's son with monthly benefits amounted to 68 thousand rubles until he reached adulthood, alongside a retroactive payment of 261 thousand rubles for the period between the incident and the trial. In the decision of the Butyrsky District Court of 3 March 2015, it was separately noted that one of the plaintiffs, the family of the murdered police officer, withdrew their claims; the civil claims of the other victims were included into the proceedings.

In October 2015, the plaintiff filed a lawsuit to the Butyrsky District Court on behalf of the teacher's family (mother, widow, and child) asking the court to recover 10 million rubles from Gordeyev's parents as compensation for moral damage, recover 739 thousand rubles spent on the funeral, and demand him to pay monthly benefits of 37 thousand rubles to Kirillov's child until he reaches adulthood. On 15 December 2015, the court brought in Gordeyev as a co-defendant in the lawsuit. Additionally, the court denied the defendant's request to hold a closed trial. On 1 February 2016, the court refused to suspend the lawsuit until the legitimacy of the criminal case was proven. The plaintiff's representative, Lyudmila Aivar, stated that there were no grounds for terminating the hearing, since the teenager himself was not present at the hearing, but was represented by a lawyer. Prosecutor supported this position.

On 24 February, the plaintiff increased the price demand of the claim, asking the court to collect 10 million rubles from Gordeyev's parents (5 million each from Kirillov's mother and widow) as compensation for moral damages, and also to oblige them to provide him with monthly payments of 36,135 rubles 44 kopecks, alongside and a retroactive payment of 893,749 rubles 88 kopecks for the period in-between the incident and the trial. On 2 March, the court partially satisfied the claim by obliging Viktor and Irina Gordeyev to support Kirillov's family with a one-time payment of 700 thousand rubles and monthly payments of 36 thousand rubles. The court also collected 936 thousand rubles from the defendant as a retroactive compensation for the period between the incident and the trial. In August 2016, the Gordeyev family filed an appeal with the Moscow City Court. On 12 September, the court ruled to leave this decision unchanged.

=== Trial of Viktor Gordeyev ===
In May 2014, a criminal case was opened against the shooter's father, Viktor Gordeyev, for negligent storage of firearms under Article 224 of the Russian Criminal Code. It was suspended "until a decision is made on the main case". A year later, the case proceeded to trial. The investigators refused to recognize Kirillov's relatives and Bushuev's wife as victims in this criminal case, and denied their claim any compensation. In June 2015, Viktor Gordeyev was granted an amnesty by the judge of the Magistrate's Court Precinct No. 91 of the Butyrsky District of Moscow.

== Reactions ==
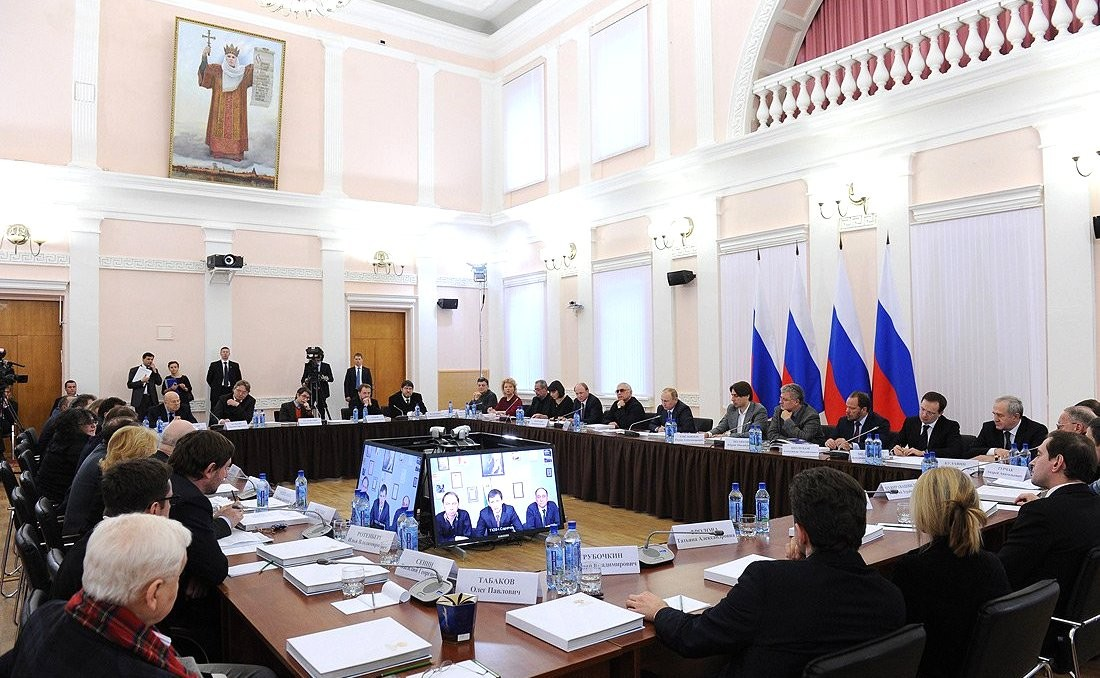
Meeting of the Ministry of Culture on 3 February, 2014 in Pskov

On 3 February, 2014, President of Russia Vladimir Putin attended a meeting of the Ministry of Culture, where he responded to the incident calling it a tragedy and urged people to pay more attention to the education of the younger generation. Putin also suggested such tragedies might be prevented by placing a greater emphasis on culture in children's upbringing, such as the theatrical arts.

=== Security ===
Russian Education Minister Dmitry Livanov said the Ministry of Education would take additional security measures following the incident, analyze the cause behind the shooting, and strive to achieve "absolute safety" in schools.

The Commissioner for Children's Rights, Pavel Astakhov, called for a security check in all children's institutions: "I consider it necessary to organize, with the participation of regulatory and law enforcement agencies, checks of the state of anti-terrorist and anti-criminal security in all educational and children's organizations, their provision with adequate security and video surveillance, the staffing of child and adolescent psychologists, the availability and effectiveness of conflict resolution services, and school police inspectors". Following the incident, prosecutors of the Moscow region and other regions of Russia conducted inspections in educational institutions to ensure they complied with legislative requirements on safety of students and employees.

=== Legislative ===
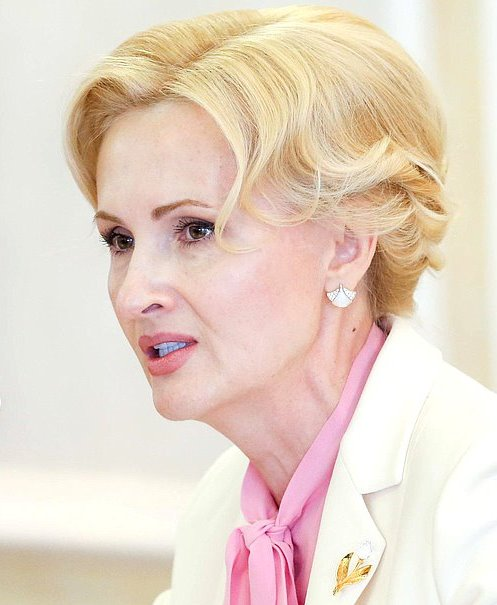
Chairperson of the State Duma, Irina Yarovaya, called for stricter gun control in Russia following the incident.

The chairperson of the State Duma Committee on Security and Anti-Corruption Irina Yarovaya stated that there was a need to limit the spread of weapons in the country as much as possible and called for stricter control over the weapon storage. Yarovaya also opined that this case was an atypical incident for Russia.

A number of the Liberal Democratic Party members proposed amendments to Article 4 of the Law on Mass Media that would restrict the TV broadcast of violent scenes involving minors during daytime. The party also proposed the creation of a department of the State Duma that would deal with issues connected with the safety in schools. Oleg Mikheyev, State Duma member and A Just Russia Party member, submitted amendments to Article 16 of the Federal Law for the consideration of the Duma, which proposed to remove from public access "computer programs and databases prohibited for children". The explanatory note to the bill stipulated that it concerned video games that contain cruelty and violence. Mikheyev told the press that he had been developing the bill long before the shooting incident at School No. 263. Chief Sanitary Inspector of Russia, Gennady Onishchenko, also linked the incident to video games. United Russia politician Aleksey Pushkov suggested exposure to American culture as another potential target to blame.

The Civic Chamber proposed to amend Article 156 of the Criminal Code of Russia ("Failure to fulfill responsibilities for the upbringing of a minor"), with Olga Kostina, a member of the chamber and leader of the human rights movement "Resistance", urging to think about the parents who taught a teenager to use a weapon and did not pay attention to his psychological state. Deputies of the Moscow City Duma have proposed amendments to the federal law "On Private Detective and Security Activities" that would allow school security guards to be equipped with batons and stun guns. The proposal to arm school security guards and teachers was also put forward by pro-gun organizations. Vitaly Milonov, a deputy of the Legislative Assembly of Saint Petersburg of the fourth and fifth convocations, developed and presented a draft amendment to the federal law "On Weapons". According to this initiative, owners of traumatic pistols and hunting rifles would have to undergo a medical examination annually, and not once every five years.

== In popular culture ==
In early 2014, Komsomolskaya Pravda reported that the Moscow School of New Cinema had begun filming the feature film School Shooter based on both the novel Rage by Stephen King and the events at School No. 263, which, according to the creators, are similar to the plot of the novel. Filming took place on the grounds off Secondary School No. 165.

== See also ==
- 2014 in Russia
- List of school shootings in Russia
- List of attacks related to secondary schools
- 1993 East Carter High School shooting and 1996 Frontier Middle School shooting — similar incidents in the United States
- Beslan school siege — hostage crisis at a school in Beslan, Russia
