= Non-Department Security of the National Guard =

- Вневедомственная охрана Росгвардии
- Active: 2016
- Allegiance: Russian Federation
- Branch: National Guard of Russia
- Type: Paramilitary security

Non-Departamental Security of the National Guard (Russian: Вневедомственная охрана Росгвардии) is a state unit subordinated to the National Guard of Russia with special police ranks that provides protection for especially important and sensitive facilities (including those subject to mandatory protection by the National Guard troops), property of individuals and legal entities under contracts, and participates in ensuring the protection of public order, preventing and suppressing crimes and administrative offenses. Since 2016, it has become a structural unit of the Federal Service of the National Guard Troops of the Russian Federation. The unit's employees are not part of the staff of organizations, institutions, or industrial enterprises whose facilities they guard, hence the name "non-departmental security" to distinguish it from departmental security.

== History ==
On March 3, 1920, industrial militia units were created in the RSFSR to protect industrial facilities and stockpiles of products and raw materials.

On February 6 1924, the Council of People's Commissars of the RSFSR adopted a Resolution on the creation of departmental militia and approved the Regulation on the departmental militia. It was created to protect the property of state enterprises and institutions, as well as private organizations of national importance, and to maintain law and order within the territory occupied by these facilities. The departmental militia was created on a contractual basis with the administration of the national economic facilities that it guarded, and was maintained at their expense.

On October 29, 1952, by Resolution No. 4633-1835 of the Council of Ministers of the Soviet Union "On the use in industry, construction and other sectors of the national economy of workers released from security, and measures to improve the organization of security of economic facilities of ministries and departments", a non-departmental external guard guard (VNSO) was created under the bodies of the Ministry of Internal Affairs. Guard brigades protecting trade and business facilities were transferred to the subordination of the internal affairs agencies.

In 1959, the functions of inspecting departmental security were transferred to the non-departmental security.

Since 1962, the non-departmental security was tasked with introducing technical security equipment (security, fire alarms), and developing centralized security for facilities.

On February 18, 1966, the Resolution of the Council of Ministers of the Soviet Union approved the Model Regulation on Non-departmental Security in the Police Bodies, which determined that non-departmental security in the police bodies is organized to protect enterprises, construction sites, institutions and organizations located in cities, workers' settlements and district centers, and consists of paramilitary units designed to protect especially important and restricted facilities, and guard units designed to protect other facilities. Non-departmental security in the police bodies was under the jurisdiction of the ministries of public order protection of the union republics. The paramilitary units of the non-departmental security of the police agencies consisted of detachments, separate teams, groups and sections, and the guard units - of brigades. The paramilitary units were armed with carbines, rifles, pistols and revolvers.

As of 1975, the total number of non-departmental security in the Soviet Union was 53 thousand people, 200 thousand objects were under protection.

As of the beginning of December 1987, the total number of non-departmental security in the Soviet Union was almost 1 million people (including 178 thousand police officers, but the majority of the employees were guards), 600 thousand objects and 1 million premises (including over 50% of industrial facilities, enterprises and organizations and almost all trade and catering enterprises) and 410 thousand apartments were under protection. Due to the introduction of technical security equipment in the period from 1977 to the end of 1987, the number of guards was reduced by 143 thousand people (with an annual payroll of 134.7 million rubles). As reported by the head of the Main Directorate of Non-Departmental Security of the Soviet Ministry of Internal Affairs Major General of Police L. Popov, during 1987, non-departmental security officers prevented up to 30 thefts daily and detained up to 40 criminals and offenders.

=== Contemporary period ===
On August 14, 1992, the Government of Russia adopted the "Regulations on Non-Departmental Security under the Internal Affairs Bodies of the Russian Federation".

In 1993–2005, the non-departmental security included the Paramilitary security units.

In 2003, the total number of non-departmental security in Russia was 477 thousand people, and more than 427 thousand objects were under the protection of the Department security units.

In 2005, the service was reorganized, the Department of State Property Protection of the Ministry of Internal Affairs of Russia was created, and a specialized unitary enterprise was formed, FSUE "Okhrana" of the Ministry of Internal Affairs of Russia, which designs, installs, and connects security and access control systems. The FSUE "Okhrana" included employees of the paramilitary, guard, and technical services of non-departmental security.

Since that time, non-departmental security units (NDU) have only been protecting facilities by monitoring technical security equipment and responding to alarm signals (including those received from other structures monitoring security systems).

As of July 2006, the number of Non-departmental security employed 450 thousand people, including:

- 247 thousand police officers;
- 103 thousand employees of the Federal State Unitary Enterprise "Okhrana";
- 100 thousand civilian employees - these are duty officers at centralized control panels and employees of support units.

In connection with the reform of law enforcement agencies, in 2010–2012, it was planned to increase the number of NDUs by 35 thousand people, up to 485 thousand people. After the creation of the Federal Service of Troops of the National Guard of the Russian Federation (Rosgvardia) in Russia in 2016, NDUs became part of it.
