= School No. 263 (Moscow) =

School in Moscow, Russia

Coordinates: 55°51′25″N 37°36′51″E

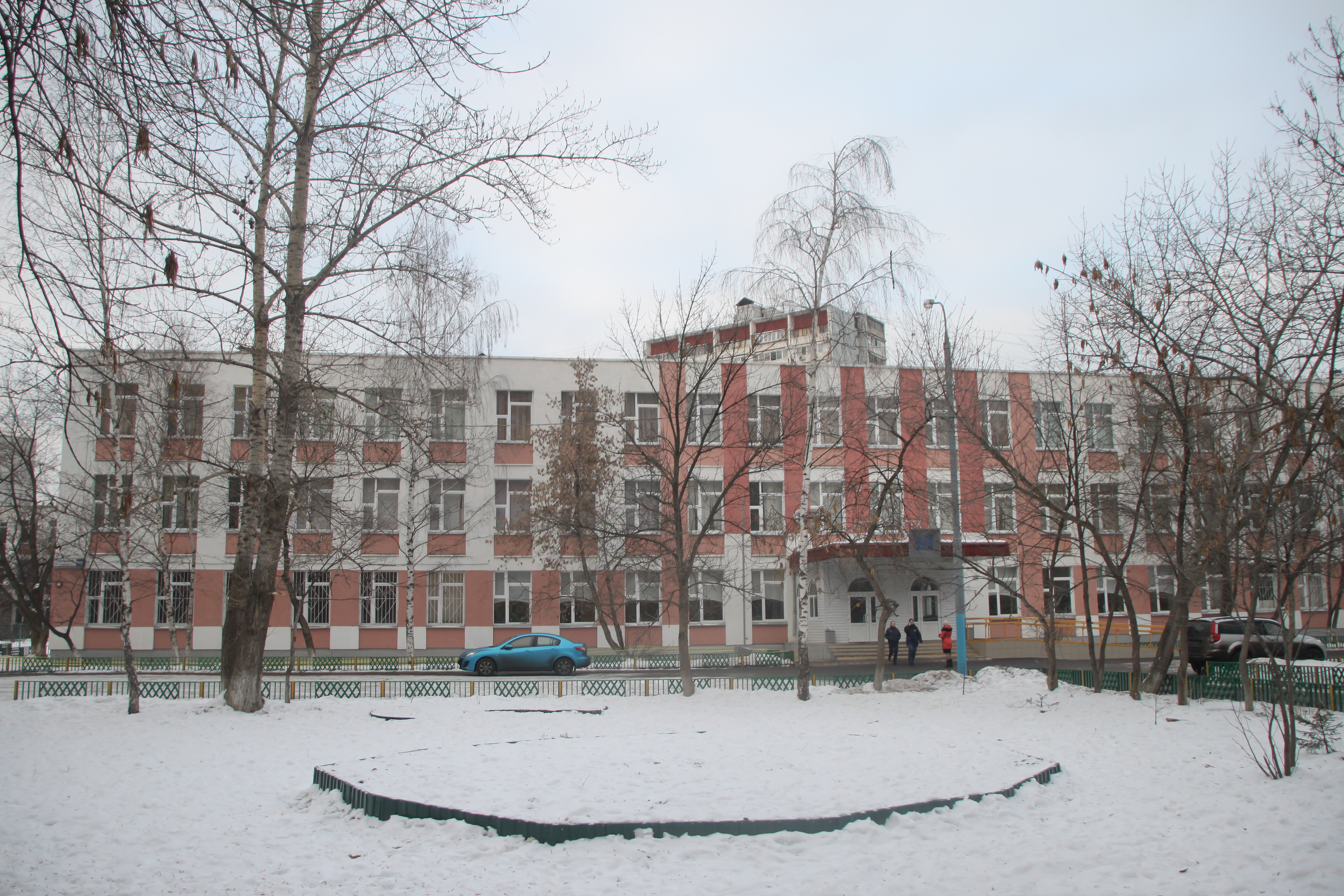

School No. 263 (Russian: средняя школа № 263) is located in Otradnoye District, North-Eastern Administrative Okrug, Moscow and has high school-level students.

The 2014 Moscow school shooting occurred there on February 3, 2014.
