= Gun control in the Soviet Union =

Overview of legal policies in the USSR

Weapons legislation in the USSR was a part of the USSR legislation that regulated the status of weapons (incl. firearms), ammunition, gunpowder and other explosives on the territory of the USSR.

== History ==
On November 10, 1917, People's Commissar A. I. Rykov signed a decree on the creation of the militsiya. The police station buildings and their stables with their equipment were transferred to the disposal of the Workers' and Peasants' Militsiya. Initially, the militsiya units were volunteer armed formations for the protection of public order, which did not have a permanent structure. They were subordinate to local Soviets and the local government department of the NKVD.

On January 15, 1918, V. I. Lenin signed the decree of the Council of People's Commissars on the creation of the Workers' and Peasants' Red Army. In the spring of 1918, the creation of a system of mass military training for the population began. On April 22, 1918, a decree of the VTsIK clarified the requirements for military training of the population (military training was given to men from the working class between the ages of 18 and 40, and women could participate in military training voluntarily).

During the civil war, small local militsiya units were ineffective, and in the spring of 1918 the task was set to create a unified state system to ensure public order and combat criminal activity. Also, during military operations, some Red Army commanders used the militsiya as reinforcements for their military units. On May 10, 1918, the NKVD issued a decree stating that the militsiya is a permanent (operating 24 hours a day) state service, and that its functions are strictly separated from those of the Red Army.

In July 1918, the first constitution was adopted, which provided for the equality of citizens of all nationalities and proclaimed the defense of the socialist homeland as the duty of all citizens of the country.

During the Russian Civil War, the Soviet government allowed a variety of small arms and bladed weapons. The government had made it a point to "arm the working people", but also of disarming the exploiting classes, in the Declaration of the Rights of Working and Exploited People in January 1918.

On May 28, 1922, the prosecutor's office was created (whose employees were employees of the People's Commissariat of Justice and had the right to carry a handgun for self-defense).

On December 29, 1922, the Treaty on the Creation of the Union of Soviet Socialist Republics was signed, but the creation of a unified legal system (incl. criminal law) in the territory of the USSR continued in the 1920s and even in the 1930s.

In the summer of 1923, the first forest code was adopted, according to which the restoration of forests and reserves began. To protect forests, defend themselves from dangerous wild animals, and combat poachers, illegal logging, and other crimes, foresters were given the right to own and carry firearms.

In September 1923, the first USSR championship in sport shooting was held in Novogireyevo in Moscow oblast.

On December 12, 1924, the Central Executive Committee of the USSR promulgated its degree "On the procedure of production, trade, storage, use, keeping and carrying firearms, firearm ammunition, explosive projectiles and explosives", all weapons were classified and divided into categories. Now the weapons permitted for personal possession by ordinary citizens could only be smoothbore hunting shotguns. Other categories of weapons were only possessed by those who were assigned duties by the Soviet state; for all others, access to these weapons was restricted to within state-regulated shooting ranges.

In the summer of 1925, in preparation for the 3rd USSR Shooting Championship, the rules for sport shooting were clarified (from September 1925, shooting with a 7.62mm military rifle and shooting with rifles of other models became different types of sport shooting).

Illegal gun possession was severely punished. Since March 1933 the manufacture, possession, purchase, sale of firearms (except for smoothbore hunting weapons) without proper authorization was punishable by up to five years in prison.

In December 1932, the title and badge of "Voroshilov Sharpshooter" were established for marksmanship by OSOAVIAKhIM.

On June 22, 1941, the Axis invasion of the USSR began. Many sporting events were cancelled. The war brought great destruction, significant devastation and slowed down the post-war development of shooting sports in the USSR.

In 1948, annual competitions in skeet shooting for the prize of the newspaper "Vechernyaya Moskva" began (the winner of these competitions received a special crystal cup as a reward).

In 1952, the USSR resumed holding 100 meter running deer sport competitions. According to the 1952 rules, shooters were allowed to use a bolt-action rifle or semi-automatic rifle of any model, loaded with at least two cartridges.

After the death of Joseph Stalin in 1953, the USSR saw a small wave of liberalisations for civilian gun ownership. Soviet civilians were allowed to purchase smoothbore hunting shotguns again, even without mandatory submission of hunting licenses. However, this lasted for not more than six years. The buyer again had to pre-register in the Soviet Society of Hunters since 1959.

A small number of enthusiasts began underwater hunting in the summer of 1956 with self-made homemade equipment. They hunted fish with spears, harpoons and similar equipment. In April 1957, an official clarification was issued to the public that underwater hunting with spear, harpoon, speargun, crossbow and with or without underwater swimming gear is a completely legal activity - and in the USSR they had already begun to make equipment for underwater hunters in small quantities. In accordance with the legislation of the USSR, underwater hunting for fish and crabs (without firearms, poisoned ammunition, gunpowder and other explosives) was not considered as "hunting", it was "fishing" In summer 1960, Western writer J. Aldridge came to the USSR on a visit, with whom there were meetings and interviews about underwater swimming, diving and underwater hunting (he was known as the author of the book "Undersea Hunting for Inexperienced Englishmen"). In September 1960, the first USSR championship in underwater hunting took place on the Caspian Sea. After these events, underwater hunting became a popular sport in the USSR. It was possible to use a spear, a harpoon, a knife, spearguns, crossbows, underwater swimming gear and some other special equipment to hunt fish. Various spearguns and ammunition for them were made and sold in the USSR.

With the introduction of the new Criminal Code in 1960, penalties were significantly reduced for illegal possession of firearms, down to a mandatory two years of imprisonment, while the possession of melee weapons was no longer prohibited in the USSR. Fourteen years later, the punishment for illegal purchase, keeping and carrying of weapons was increased again to five years' imprisonment. However, unregistered firearms that were voluntarily surrendered were met without responsibility or punishment.

Since 1969, the annual Golden Pheasant shooting competition was held in Alma-Ata for the prize of the newspaper "Vechernyaya Alma-Ata" (after 1991, it became a regional shooting competition in Kazakhstan, and since 2010, it has been an international shooting competition).

Changing the length of the barrel of a firearm was not prohibited. It was possible to buy, sell or own old smooth-bore hunting shotguns with already shortened barrels (if the barrel length is at least 500 mm). Owners were allowed to shorten the buttstock or barrel of their hunting shotgun or rifle if they do it in a gun workshop. It was allowed to re-equip shotguns with pistol grip and detachable buttstock. Firearms with a barrel length of less than 500 mm were illegal and had to be confiscated.

== See also ==
- Gun control in Russia
