= School No. 1535, Moscow =

School № 1535
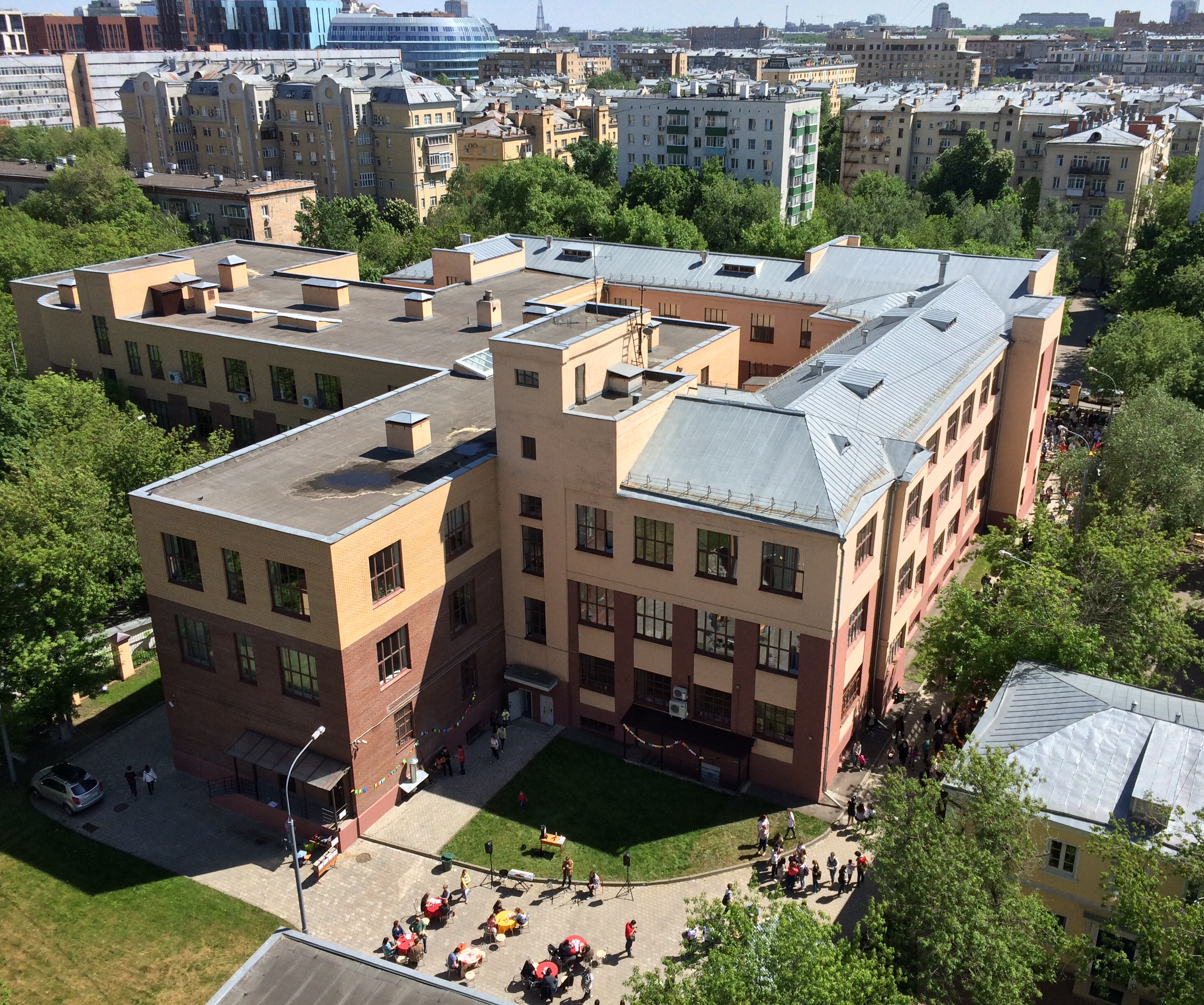

Location
- Usacheva str, 50; Maly Savvinsky per., 8. Moscow; Russia
- Coordinates: 55.7261°N 37.5649°E

Information
- Type: Secondary school
- Established: 1991
- Director: S.S. Sekhin
- Years offered: 7-11
- Language: English, German, French, Chinese
- Slogan: «The great thing in this world is not so much where we stand, as in what direction we are moving» Oliver Wendell Holmes, Sr.
- Website: www.lyc1535.mskobr.ru

School № 1535 is a secondary school for students of years 7-11 in the Khamovniki District of Moscow, Russia.

== History ==
=== Pre-lyceum period ===
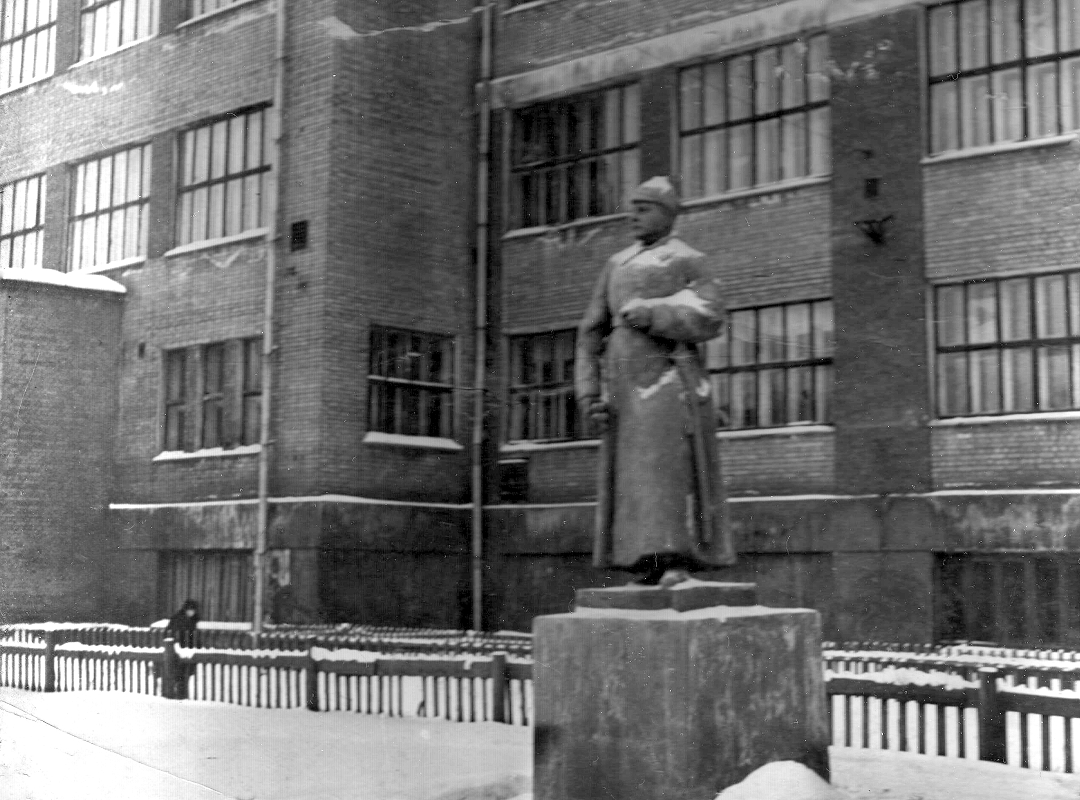
School named after Voroshilov, 1937

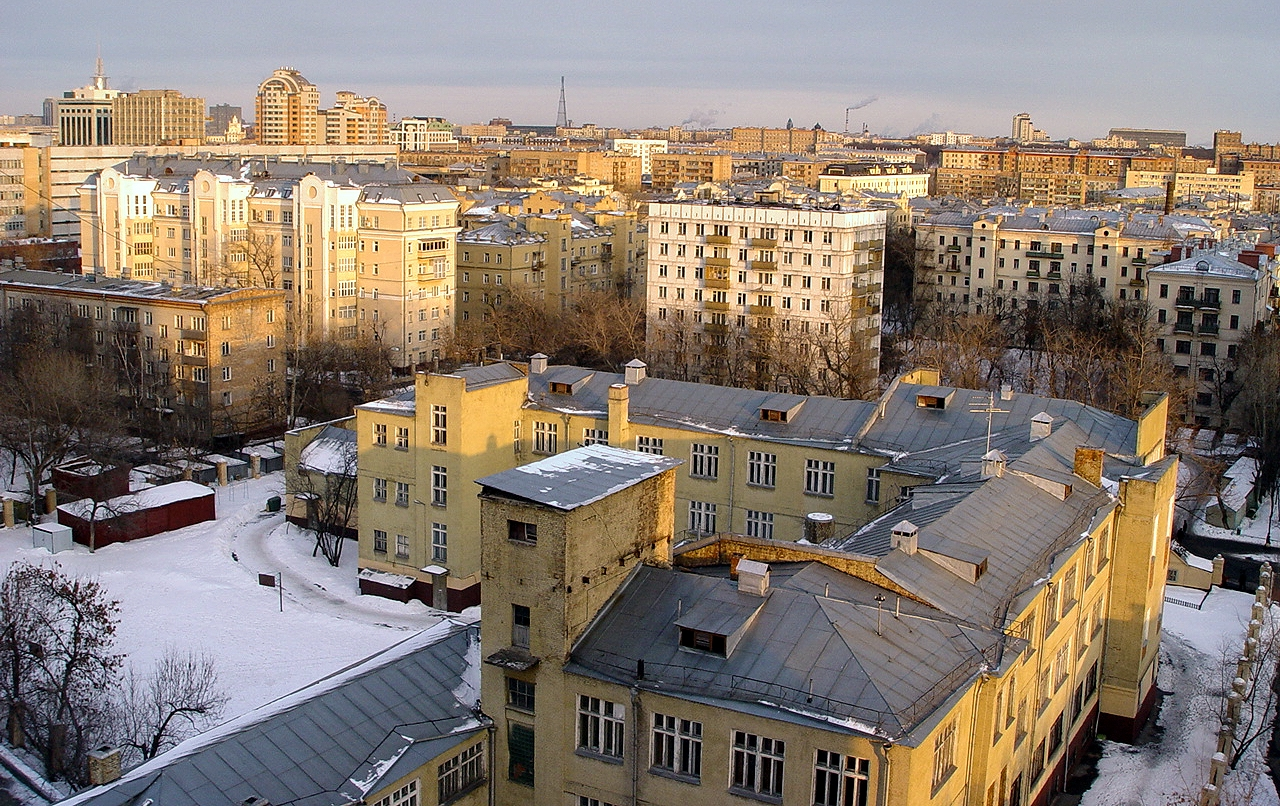
Lyceum building prior to reconstruction, 2003 год

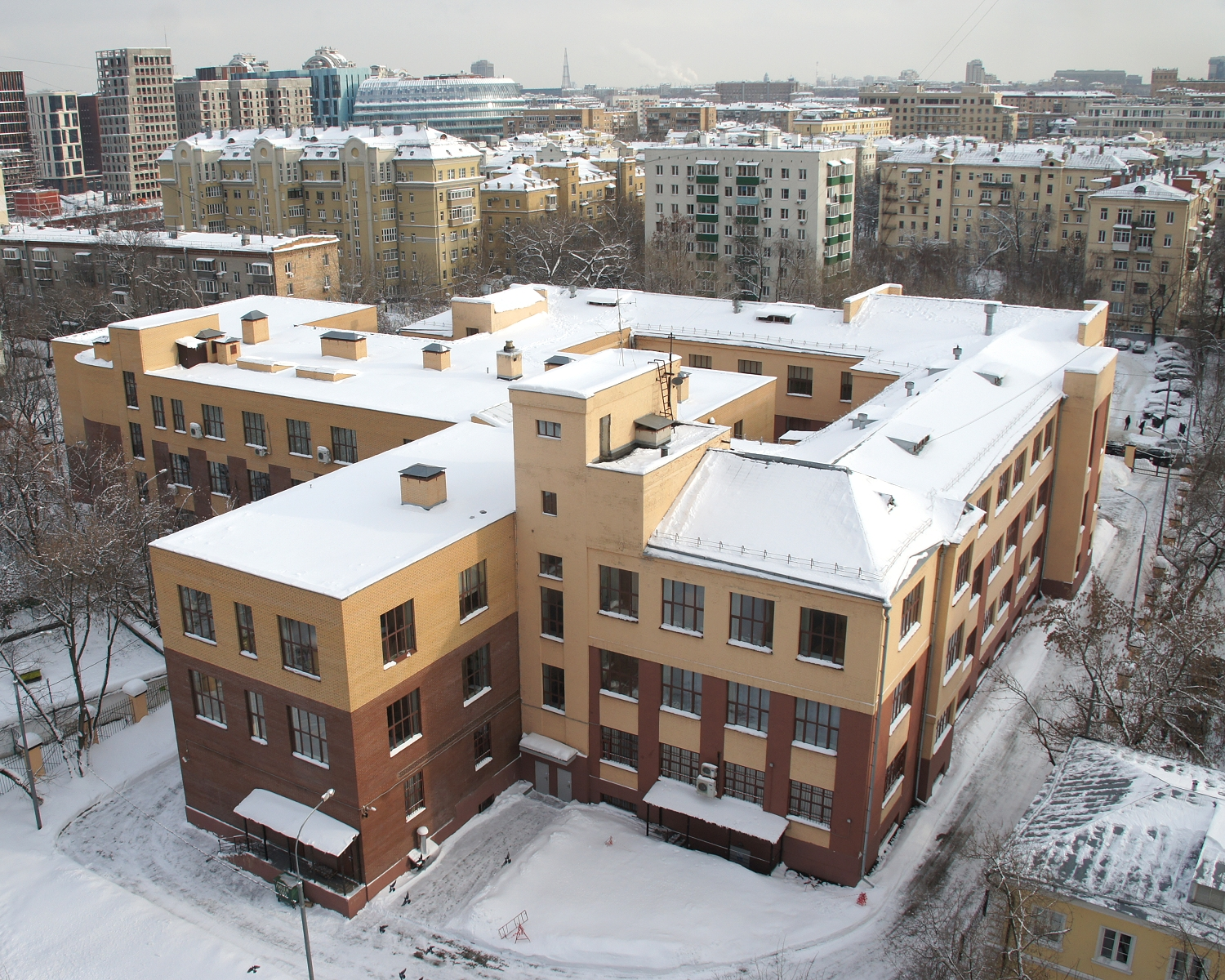
Lyceum building prior to reconstruction, 2003 год

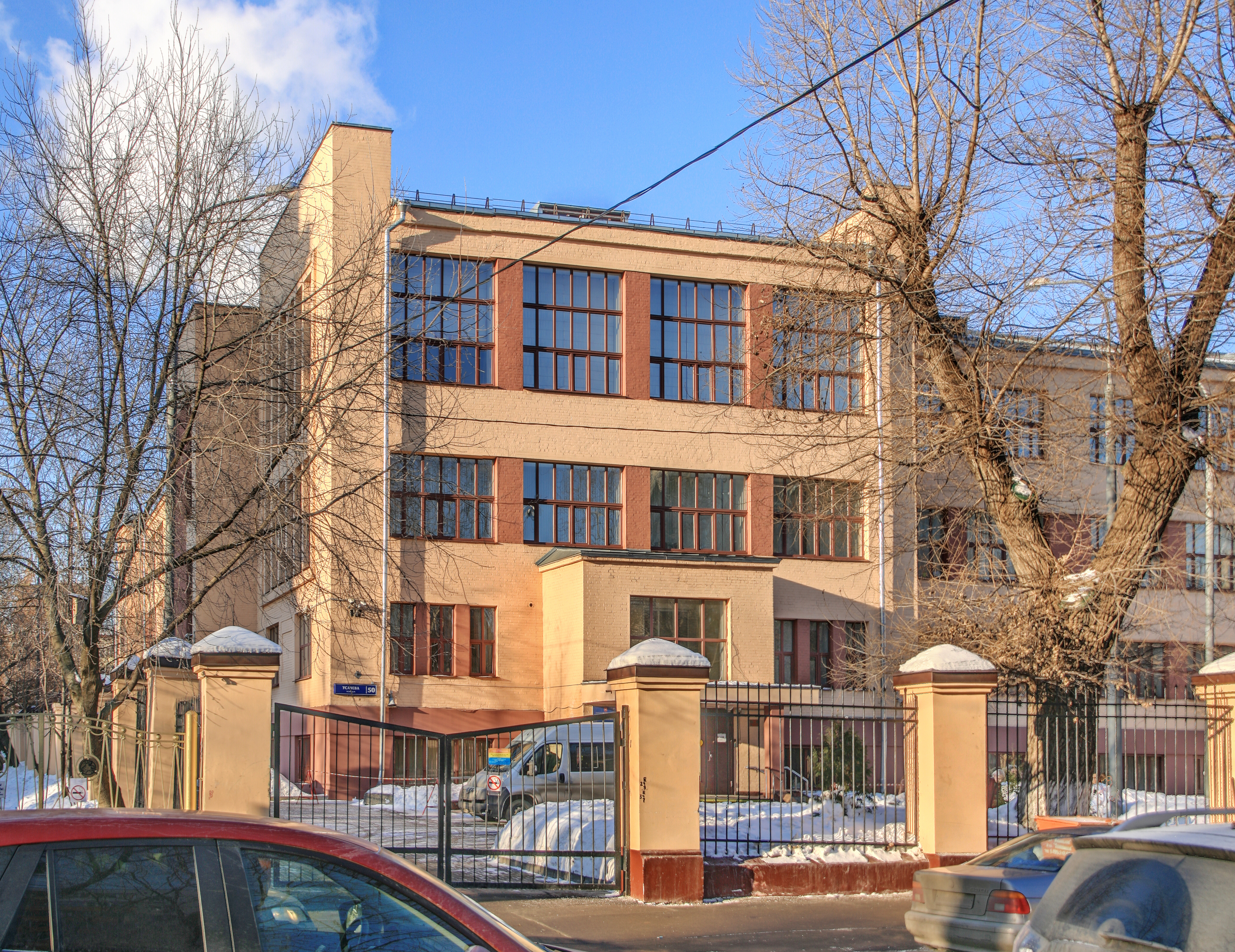
Lyceum, 2017

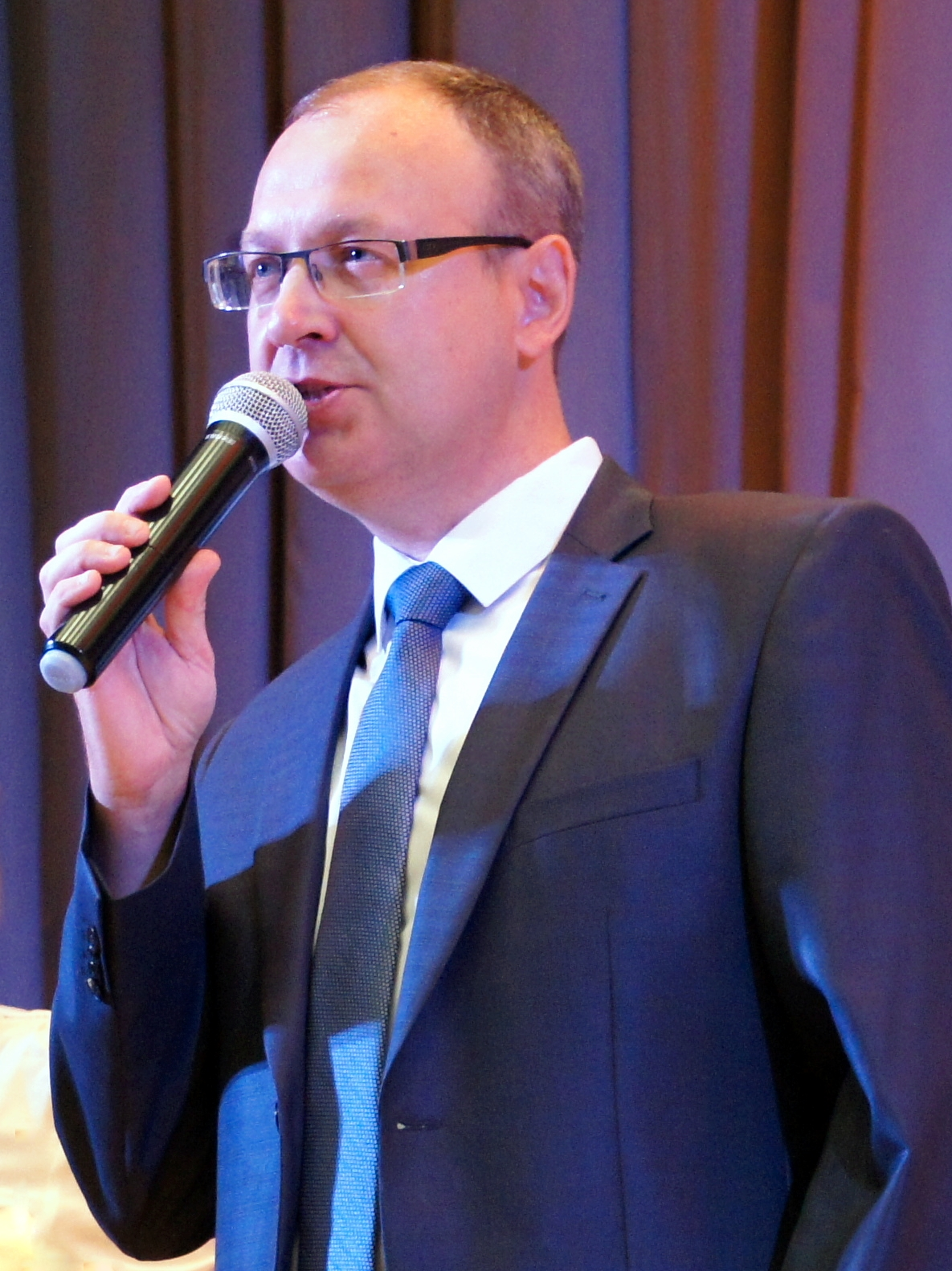
Director S.S.Sekhin, 2018 г.

The school building was built in 1929 according to the project by architect M.Motylev.

Since 1930, the school was called Frunzensky District Secondary School №2 named after K.E.Voroshilov. In 1937, the school was renamed into Secondary School № 23 named after K.E.Voroshilov. The school building hosted military hospital during the WW-II.

Since 1956, old school building hosted Secondary Boarding School № 14 with classes with Chinese language specialization. Oriental languages have been studied in addition to English, German, or French.

=== Lyceum ===
In 1991, experimental Lyceum with oriental specialization was opened. The Lyceum initially had 350 students. In 2004-2005, the school has been closed for renovation with two new buildings being added to the complex.

After merger with the School № 35 of I.M. Sechenov First Moscow State Medical University (Sechenov University) (since 2010 – Sechenov Lyceum within Lyceum № 1535). The number of students reached 900.

In August 2017, all Moscow gymnasiums and Lyceums have been formally transferred to Schools, hence the renaming to current name – School № 1535.

=== Management ===
Directors:

- 1936 — I.P. Kazantsev, director of Secondary School № 2 named after K.E.Voroshilov.
- 1948 — Schepakin, director of Secondary School № 23 named after K.E.Voroshilov 1956 — Utenkov, Petr Arkadievich, director of Boarding School № 14.
- 1991 — Mokrinsky, Mikhail Gennadievich. Head of Education Department of Central District of Moscow since 2012. Since 2016, in the Letovo School.
- 2012 — Vorobyova, Tatiana Vasilievna, former director of Boarding School № 14.
- 2017 — Sekhin, Sergey Sergeevich, former director of School № 1210 of North-West District of Moscow.

== Modern school ==
Admission is based on entrance exams. Average class is about 30 students.

Students of Years 7-9 specialize in the following areas:

- mathematics
- humanitarian
- bio-medical

Students of Years 10-11 choose one of the following specializations:

- social-humanitarian (with emphasis on history)
- social-humanitarian (with emphasis on mathematics)
- history & philology
- economics & mathematics
- physics & mathematics
- IT & technology
- biology & medicine (including Latin language)
- medicine and mathematics (on top of Russian, chemistry, and biology there is additional focus on mathematics)
- psychology
- socio-psychology

== In school rankings ==
- 2006 — in the Moscow secondary schools ranking of Izvestia newspaper, the Lyceum got tied in 7th/8th place with Moscow Lyceum №1525 Vorobyevy Gory; the Lyceum №1525 was ranked firstamong schools for teaching French language and second for teaching English.
- 2008 — included by «Big City» magazine in the list of the “Most interesting schools in Moscow».
- 2010 — ranked 6th in Moscow for overall results in schools subjects’ Olympiads, and 4th for results of Unified State Examination (USE).
- 2011 — ranked 1st in Top-10 Best Schools in Moscow by Moscow city administration based on USE and Olympiads results, and ranked 1st in Best Secondary Schools in Economics by Moscow State University based on Open Schools Championship in Economics in 2011. Next year Lyceum №1535 again took the lead in the top Moscow schools ranking by the Moscow city Department of Education and remained undisputed leader of the Moscow ranking by 2016.
- 2013 — ranked 1st (tie with the Moscow Center for Continuous Mathematical Education) in top-500 Best Schools in Russia based on overall results of USE and all-Russian and international Olympiads.
- 2017 — ranked 4th in Top-500 Best Secondary Schools in Russia
