= Federal State Unitary Enterprise Guard (Russia) =

Security company

Federal State Unitary Enterprise "Guard"
- Great emblem

- Patch
- Native name: ФГУП «Охрана Росгвардии»
- Company type: State company
- Industry: State paramilitary protection
- Genre: Security services
- Founded: 2005
- Founder: Ministry of Internal Affairs (Russia)
- Headquarters: 5/1 Delegatskaya Street, Moscow, Russia
- Key people: CEO: Stanislav Osipov
- Owner: National Guard of Russia
- Website: fgup-ohrana.ru

Federal State Unitary Enterprise "Guard" is governmental militarized security organization of the National Guard of Russia.

== History ==
In 2005, the security organization was established under the Ministry of the Interior of Russia. The enterprise has 80 branches in the regions of Russia, representing the services of physical, paramilitary protection, panel guard, installation and maintenance of security systems.

In 2016 in accordance with the decree of the president of Russia, the organization became a part of the National Guard of Russia. The general director is the colonel of the reserve Stanislav Osipov.

== Legal Basis ==
FSUE Okhrana (English: Security) of the National Guard of Russia operates on the basis of the Charter. “Militarized and guard units” of the Federal State Unitary Enterprise “Security” are subject to the provisions of the Federal Law “On Departmental Security” (Article 26). Unlike departmental security, it has the right to carry out on a contractual basis the protection of objects of all forms of ownership, regardless of departmental affiliation. Employees of the enterprise use special means and military hand-held small arms adopted by the Russian Guard troops, as well as service and civilian weapons permitted for circulation on the territory of the Russian Federation.

== Divisions ==
Federal State Unitary Enterprise Guard is divided into five major Centers as follows:

- Center for the Protection of Industrial Facilities (CPOP);
- Center for Security of Fuel and Energy Complex Facilities (COO TEK);
- Center for the Protection of Objects of the Agro-Industrial Complex (CPO AIC);
- Center for the Protection of Communication Facilities (COOS);
- Center for the Protection of Civil Objects.
