= Paramilitary security in Russia =

Paramilitary security in Russia (Russian: Военизированная охрана) are specialized paramilitary organizations, security units with a special legal status (mainly state-owned), armed with combat small arms and firearms, that protect the country's infrastructure facilities of important state significance, as well as cargo and other property. The nomenclature of property of various types subject to protection by the paramilitary security (lists of infrastructure facilities, names of cargo, etc.) is established by legal acts of various departments (ministries, enterprises, institutions, etc.) and/or state bodies or international treaties. Paramilitary security units may be included in the regular troops or used as auxiliary forces during a war, armed conflict, or counter-terrorism operation.

== History ==
=== Departmental paramilitary guard ===
==== Departmental guards and the VOKhR (1918–1924) ====
During the Russian Revolution, the Bolsheviks had a paramilitary organisation called the Red Guards, they developed into the Red Army after Vladimir Lenin wrote: "There is only one way to prevent the restoration of the police, and that is to create a people's militia and to fuse it with the army (the standing army to be replaced by the arming of the entire people)."

The Soviet authorities paid special attention to the protection of communication routes and industrial enterprises. Decree of the Council of People's Commissars (SNC) published on March 26, 1918) "On the centralization of management, protection of roads and increase of their transportability" military protection of Railways was established from detachments organized mainly from railway workers, who were subordinate to responsible persons appointed or approved by the People's Commissar of Railways. These detachments, including the duties of flying control detachments, both to combat stowaway and indiscriminate transportation of goods, and to combat the downtime of wagons and steam locomotives. In accordance with this Decree, the Resolution of the Council of People's Commissars of July 17, 1918 No. 600, the Directorate for the Protection of Railways was established under the People's Commissariat of Railways, it was planned to bring the number of security officers to seventy thousand people. Thus, for the first time, measures were taken to create a centralized system of departmental protection.

The created armed security units were able to slightly improve the order on the railways, the railwaymen were protected from raids by armed gangs. At the same time, some roads sought to independently solve the issues of security organization, opposing the centralization of security management and did not take into account the instructions of the NKPS. In addition, employees. The Cheka criticized the railway security:

The materials available to the commission on protection from a number of localities of the Soviet Federation indicate many cases of inndonation, a disorganizing action to combat fraud, cases of collision of food detachments with the protection of the railways on the Kursk line and a number of processes in the hands of the All-Russian Extraordinary Commission for Combating Counter-Revolution and Speculation – all this gives the right to conclude that the railway guard cannot be considered reliable, cannot protect a major railway mechanism and can politically pose a huge danger to the Soviet power... Thus, life itself dictates the need to organize a corps of disciplined and militarily trained people.

Other departments also created their own armed formations that were not part of the Red Army (ship protection of the Main Department of Water Transport (created on May 14, 1918, transferred to the NKVD of the RSFSR on July 25, 1918, in order to create a river militia), protection of Glavsahar, protection of the Centertextile, etc.) Accordingly, each of these departments used its own armed formations at its own discretion. In this regard, on August 19, 1918. The Council of People's Commissars adopted a decree on the unification of all armed forces of the republic and their transfer to the jurisdiction of the People's Commissariat for Military Affairs. At a meeting of the Revolutionary Council of the Republic on September 15, 1918, it was announced that the railway guard was subordinate to the Revolutionary Military Council. The said Decree of the Council of People's Commissars No. 668 was announced in the order of the Revolutionary military Council of the Republic No. 46 only on October 10, 1918.

On November 28, 1918, by the decree of the Council of People's Commissars, martial law was introduced on the railways, all railway employees were considered called up for military service, remaining in the performance of their duties. The previously existing NKPS communication route security

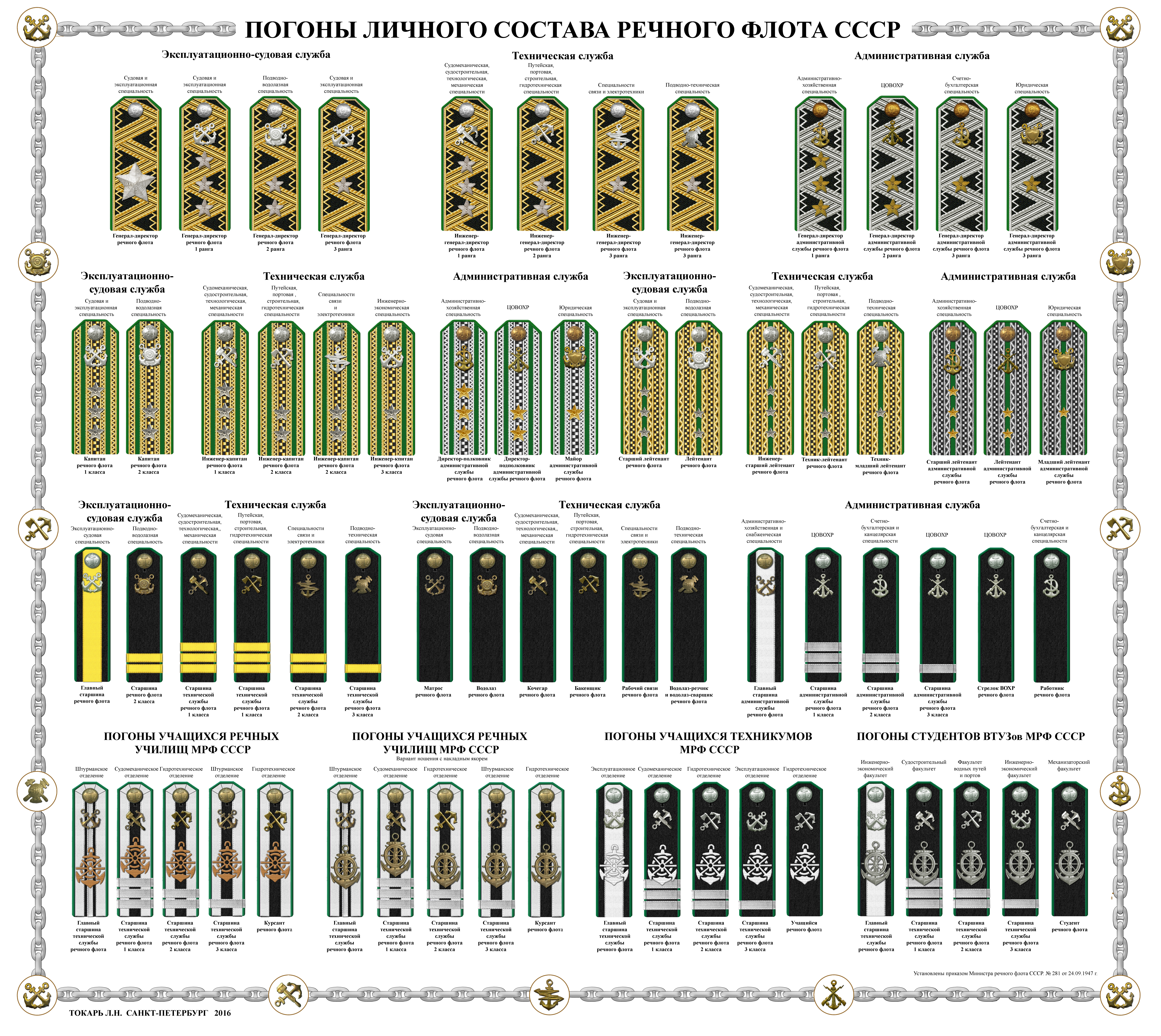
Insignia of the paramilitary protection of the river fleet of the 1947 model.

was disbanded, its personnel with all property and weapons were transferred to the military department.

The Red army was established in 1918 soon after the revolution, the predecessor of the VOKhR paramilitary was called the "Departmental armed and unarmed guards". At the time the Russian Civil War had begun and had already greatly affected the Bolsheviks, they had taken over the government but the White Army and the many minorities and republics declared war in the midst of the chaos. Because of the numerous external and internal security threats that were present during the civil war, the Council of People's Commissars created the Cheka. The Internal Security Troops of the Republic (VOKhR Troops) (RSFSR) were formally established by the Resolution of the Council of Workers' and Peasants' Defense of the RSFSR dated May 28, 1919. The VOKhR paramilitary was created and developed from the Departmental armed and unarmed guards along with the larger secret police of the Cheka, internal security was needed but the security of the undeveloped countryside of Russia and many other forms of security were also needed which was the main reason that the VOKhR branch was created.

On March 3, 1920, a department of industrial militia was established as part of the Main Directorate of Police of the RSFSR, and similar departments were formed in the provincial departments. The industrial police had a special task – to protect the economic heritage of the Republic: factories, warehouses, institutions, forests, state farms, mining, etc. In December 1921, due to the transition to NEP and a significant reduction in staff, the industrial militia was disbanded. However, many industrial and commercial enterprises, not wanting to remain defenseless, retained the material base and a team of security guards, organizing departmental protection in their staff. At the same time, a significant mass of warehouses belonging to various departments actually remained without round-the-clock security, as the low remuneration of watchmen did not contribute to the influx of those wishing to join the service, which naturally negatively affected the quality of protection

On June 1, 1921, the All-Russian Central Executive Committee and the Council of People's Commissars of the RSFSR adopted the Decree "On Measures to Combat Theft from State Warehouses and Official Crimes Contributing to Theft".

On December 9, 1921, on the initiative of Felix Dzerzhinsky adopted the Decree of the All-Russian Central Executive Committee and the STO of the RSFSR "On the protection of warehouses, warehouses and storage rooms, as well as structures on railway and waterways", according to which the Armed Protection of Communication Routes of both state (various departments) and private property was created in the structure of the NKPS of the RSFSR on the basis of the abolished railway and water militia. The defense of communication routes and the protection of individual structures of strategic importance remained with the Military Department. The protection of the NKPS of the RSFSR became the first departmental state armed protection with a special status, a prototype of paramilitary security.

On May 24, 1922, by a resolution of the All-Russian Central Executive Committee and the Council of People's Commissars of the RSFSR, the Regulation on the People's Commissariat of Internal Affairs of the RSFSR was put into effect, which entrusted the workers' and peasants' militia with the tasks of protecting most civil institutions and structures of national exceptional importance, concentration camps, forests, plantations, etc.

The Regulation determined that:

The protection of artillery warehouses, warehouses of explosives and firearms, as well as institutions of the military and maritime departments, the protection of all property transferred to the jurisdiction of these departments, as well as the transportation of goods of these departments was entrusted to the People's Commissariat for Military Affairs.

Institutions and warehouses of no national importance may be guarded by armed or unarmed guards. The determination of the importance of an institution or warehouse of local importance for the need to be punished by the police, as well as the cases of inability to entrust it to the latter, is carried out by a commission chaired by the relevant police chief or his representative and consisting of members – a representative of the People's Commissariat of the Workers' and Peasant Inspectorate and a representative of the department interested in the protection of the department.

The resolution of the above-mentioned commission serves as a basis for the interested agencies to protect civilian armed or unarmed guards and request appropriate loans for this subject.

On November 15, 1922, the government of the RSFSR considered a draft Regulation on the organization of departmental armed protection of state institutions, enterprises and property.

On February 6, 1924, the Resolution of the Council of People's Commissars of the RSFSR on the creation of a departmental militia was adopted and the Regulation on departmental police was approved. It was created to protect the property of state enterprises and institutions, as well as private organizations of state importance and the protection of law and order within the territory occupied by these facilities. The departmental police was created on a contractual basis with the administration of the national economic facilities it protected and was maintained at their expense.

==== VOKhR security units as part of the Transport Route Protection of the NKPS of the USSR (1924–1927) ====
In 1923, the military department was exempted from the protection of a number of railway transport facilities, mainly bridges of strategic importance. The duty to protect them was assigned to the NKPS of the CCCR. Since December 4, 1923, Special Armed Detachments (SVOs)began to be created as part of the Communication Routes Protection, the personnel of which began to be guided by the provisions and charters in force in the Red Army. With the formation of the PSB, the armed guards of the NKPS were divided into two parts: non-military, which was used to protect property and transported goods, and paramilitary, designed primarily to protect objects of national importance. For the first time, the position of "shooter" was introduced for ordinary employees of the PSB. Each detachment was armed with a machine gun, as well as an armoured train, which was used to escort passenger and freight trains with particularly valuable or important cargo and to repel raids of large gangs. The creation of PSBs contributed to improving the protection of facilities and cargo. Thus, if in 1922 7,888,724 poods of cargo were stolen, in 1923 only 2,221,000 poods. In September 1924, it was noted that "the obvious thefts committed by breaking the seals, running cars, etc. almost completely stopped on transport...".

On October 22, 1926, the NKPS established, according to the approved list, in 15 commercial ports (Vladivostok, Arkhangelsk and others) Armed Protection of Ports, operating on the same grounds as the railway security. The shooters and command staff had to have the trademark of the merchant fleet emblem on their uniforms (crossing sea anchor and Mercury rod).

==== Paramilitary protection of transport, enterprises and structures of state importance in the USSR (1927–1931) ====
The resolutions and resolutions of the XV Congress of the CPSU (b) in November 1927stated that the five-year plan should take into account the possibility of an attack on the USSR and its reflection. Due to the sharp aggravation of the international situation and the growing military threat from the economically stronger states, the curtailment of NEP in all areas of economic and social policy, a planned militarization of certain sectors of the economy was carried out, on the basis of departmental protection, following the example of the Protection of the Railways of the NKPS of the USSR, a system of paramilitary protection was created, special armed detachments built on the principle of military units and designed to protect transport, enterprises and other state facilities of great state importance.

===== Paramilitary protection of industrial enterprises and state structures of the Supreme Economic Council of the USSR =====
On May 12, 1927, the Council of People's Commissars of the Soviet Union adopted the "Regulations on paramilitary protection of industrial enterprises and state structures". The regulation established that the main role in the organization of paramilitary security belonged to the OGPU, whose territorial bodies were given not only the right to form paramilitary units, but also to control the organization of service at protected enterprises and institutions. Moreover, the units were excluded from subordination to the local garrisons of the Red Army, and the rights and duties of the head of the garrison, in relation to paramilitary security units, were assigned to the directors of the relevant enterprises (plants, factories, trusts and departments). The NKVD bodies were eliminated from ensuring the protection of industrial facilities, with the gradual replacement with paramilitary security units.

The circular of the Central Administrative Department (CAU) of the NKVD No. 528 No. 233 (44) of June 20, 1927 "On Paramilitary Protection" established a list of enterprises, where it was ordered to replace the departmental police with a military guard.[The completion of paramilitary protection of industrial enterprises and state structures of the Supreme Council of National Economy (VSNH) of the USSR has begun. The headquarters of the Main Directorate of Paramilitary Security of the USSR Armed Forces was staffed with experienced commanders and political workers of the Red Army. He headed the security of A. I. Selyavkin. The principle of organization of protection was adopted by the army. Within the boundaries of the army military districts, the headquarters of the industrial districts of the VOKhR were established, subordinate to regiments, battalions and individual companies. For the training and retraining of the command and commanding personnel of the shooting and fire brigades of the VOKhR in Strelna, near Leningrad (in the monastery building of the Trinity-Sergius Desert), a training base was created – the Joint Courses (School) of Command Staff Improvement.

Chairman of the Supreme Economic Council of the Soviet Union Valerian Kuybyshev On April 30, 1930 issued an order in which the work of the VOKhR was assessed:

Paramilitary guard detachments, being loyal to the watch industry, are also the main shooters of the public organization of training workers for shooting, chemical defense and the deployment of other types of Oso-Aviachim work, preparing together with the working class, in the event of an attack, to defend the conquests of the proletarian revolution.

In 1931, the paramilitary protection of the People's Commissariat of Heavy Industry was transferred to the OGPU.

====== Military guard of the NKPS of the USSR ======
On the basis of the order of the NKPS of the USSR of March 16, 1928 No. 218 "On the militaryization of the protection of communication routes", the Protection of the Ways of Communication was transformed into the Shooting Protection of the Ways, which has the status of a paramilitary guard.

Main article: Departmental (paramilitarized) protection of railway transport

===== Paramilitary protection of the People's Commissariat of Water Transport of the USSR =====
On January 30, 1931, river and sea transport was allocated from the NKPS, including the relevant units of the Rifle Protection of Communications of the NKPS to the newly created People's Commissariat for Water Transport.

===== Recruitment of paramilitary protection, rights and benefits =====
Persons of HE belonged by their status to paramilitary workers, to whom labor legislation was not covered and were equated in their rights and duties to military personnel, taking into account the specifics of their activities.

The paramilitary guard was staffed mainly from among the Red Army soldiers in reserve and junior commanders. The persons who were accepted had to be able to read and write, not have a criminal record, not to be under trial and investigation, not to be deprived of civil rights and, for health reasons, meet the requirements of the shooting service of the Red Army. The recruits pledged to serve for at least 2 years, which was given a written commitment.

Persons who entered the service of the security service undertook to comply with the requirements of departmental documents, as well as to observe discipline and order in accordance with the charters of the Red Army (internal service, garrison and disciplinary), for some exemptions due to the specific features of the service of a particular type of HE. They were subject to benefits for military personnel in the ranks of the Red Army, as well as jurisdiction to military tribunals. Penalties were applied for the crimes committed, according to the regulation on war crimes. Supervision of the legality of the actions of the commands and officials of the paramilitary security was carried out by military prosecutors. The personnel of the HE could not be a member of the trade union, and those who were members of the trade union before joining the service were considered to have left the trade union. However, at the end of service, they were automatically enlisted as members of the trade union, and the time of service in the protection was counted as a trade union experience. Private and junior command staff of the paramilitary security (not family) usually lived in barracks.

Riflemen of paramilitary protection of communication routes enjoyed the rights established by the NKPS for all workers and employees of transport, such as: the use of free tickets for travel on railways and waterways, obtaining fuel from transport warehouses, the use of medical assistance from transport medical institutions, receiving termination benefits upon dismissal, etc. The shooters who remained for a second service life had the opportunity to take training courses in one of the transport specialties. Riflemen of paramilitary security of industrial enterprises, who have served their service in good faith, enjoyed the right of extraordinary employment in protected enterprises.

On August 13, 1931, state support was established for the employees of the combat (private and superior) and administrative and economic personnel of the paramilitary guard and their families on an equal basis with the officials of the commanding staff of the Workers' and Peasants' Red Army and their families.

===== Decision on the liquidation of paramilitary guards =====
In September 1929, the STO considered the issue of transferring under the protection of the troops of the OGPU and the Workers' and Peasants' Militia of all enterprises and structures protected by the paramilitary protection of the Supreme Council of the Supreme National Army

By December 1931, the People's Commissariat of Railways of the USSR, the People's Commissariat of Water Transport, the People's Commissariat of Water Transport, Supreme Council of National Economy, People's Commissariat of Posts and Telegraphs of the USSR, Central Union of Consumer Societies.

On December 1, 1931, it was decided to transfer all departmental paramilitary protection of industrial enterprises to the OGPU. It was supposed to protect the objects (depending on the defense significance) by the police and the newly formed military units of the OGPU, and to liquidate the paramilitary security during 1932. On December 8, 1931, the resolution of the Central Committee of the CPSU (b) "On streamlining the protection of the most important economic facilities (power plants, plants, railway structures)" was adopted.

The reorganization of the paramilitary guards coincided with the mass famine that broke out in 1932/33. Freight trains were attacked by groups of starving people of up to 80–120 people. The armed guard of the NKPS, consisting only of watchmen, was unable to perform the tasks of combating theft of goods. In this regard, on the basis of the decision of the Political Bureau of the Central Committee of the CPSU(b)by the resolution of the STO of the USSR of July 27, 1932, the shooting guard was restored in the NKPS system.

===== Restoration of the paramilitary security system in the USSR (1932–1946) =====
In August 1932, the shooting protection of communication routes and the paramilitary fire protection of the NKPS was carried out under the direct leadership of the Central Directorate of Paramilitary Protection of Communications Routes, again organized in the structure of the NKPS of the USSR.

In some cases, additional tasks were entrusted to the military protection. For example, since October 1, 1932, the duties of the paramilitary protection authorities of the NKPS, in addition to the main ones, included the detention and sanitization of street children moving on the railways, providing them with food and cultural leisure. The staff of the paramilitary guard included teachers-educators carrying out their activities in wagons or waiting rooms. Thousands of lives of boys and girls were saved by NKPS security fighters. In 1932, a company from the NKPS Paramilitary Guard was sent to Central Asia, whose fighters showed courage and heroism in the fight against the Basmachs, many of them were awarded state awards.

In the 30s and 40s, armed watchmen (watch) guards operated in the structure of a number of people's commissariats. The main position in the units was called "watchman" .

The structure of some ministries of the USSR included both paramilitary and armed guards.

==== Paramilitary security in the Soviet Union (1946–1991) ====
- Regulations on paramilitary protection of the Ministry of Railways (June 25, 1949). No. 2710);
- Regulations on paramilitary protection of the Ministry of the River Fleet (February 9, 1950. No. 565);
- Regulations on paramilitary protection of the Ministry of the Navy (March 4, 1950. No. 886).

The Resolution of the Council of Ministers of the USSR of September 13, 1951 No. 3476-1616approved the Regulation on paramilitary protection of the first category. According to the Regulations, paramilitary protection was a special type of departmental protection for the protection and defense of the most important facilities of ministries and departments and was maintained from January 1, 1952, at the expense of the ministries and departments in charge of it.

On the basis of this resolution, on the basis of the 26th Brigade of the Ministry of Internal Affairs of the Soviet Union for the protection of particularly important objects the paramilitary security of the first category of the Ministry of Finance of the Soviet Union was created, which initially included 8 detachments. Four of them were stationed in Moscow and one each in Leningrad, Kiev, Kazan and Krasnokamsk, Perm Krai. The total number of personnel was about three thousand people. Employees retained the former benefits of military personnel: food rations, departmental polyclinics, kindergartens and more. The staffing of security was carried out mainly at the expense of conscripts who were to be dismissed to the reserve. The succession security owned military camps with well-equipped barracks and office premises. In 1973, as a result of another reorganization, a special paramilitary guard of the Ministry of Finance of the USSR was created.

In 1959, only two types of security were installed: paramilitary and guard Regulations on non-departmental and departmental protection were adopted, which defined the main activities, their rights and obligations, as well as relationships with owners.

On March 14, 1961, the resolution of the Council of Ministers of the Soviet Union No. 219 "On departmental paramilitary protection" was adopted, which approved the Model Regulation on departmental paramilitary protection (the effect of this Regulation did not apply to the paramilitary protection of the Ministry of Railways, the Ministry of the Navy and the Main Directorate of the Civil Air Fleet under the Council of Ministers of the USSR). The procedure for determining the objects that should be protected by departmental paramilitary security, the management system of departmental paramilitary protection were established by the Councils of Ministers of the Union Republics, ministries and departments of the USSR. The paramilitary security was maintained at the expense of protected objects or at the expense of other sources in accordance with the decisions of the Government of the USSR. The departmental paramilitary guard managed the departmental guard and, if necessary, the voluntary fire brigade

At the initiative of the Ministry of Railways of the USSR, the Decree of the Presidium of the Supreme Soviet of the USSR of June 19, 1984 was adopted. "On the detention of offenders by paramilitary guards and their use of weapons in exceptional cases."

==== Paramilitary protection of the countries of the post-Soviet space (1991 – present) ====
In most countries of the post-Soviet space, paramilitary protection continues its activities.

===== Russian Federation (1991–1999). Elimination of the paramilitary security system and creation of departmental security =====
In the Russian Federation, departmental paramilitary protection existed as a legal institution until 1999 (practically until 2002).

Due to the unfavorable socio-economic situation, the increase in the crime rate in the country, the paramilitary security units of the Ministry of Railways of the Russian Federation were in the most difficult situation. In 1992–1995 on the Trans-Baikal Railway, the consolidated groups of shooting units of the paramilitary security of the Ministry of Railways of Russia carried out the fight against mass cargo theft, robbery, robbery committed, including with the use of firearms, on stretches and in the parks of railway stations (Zabaikalsk, Borzya, Karymskaya, etc.) by the local population, railway workers and persons who specially came to this region from other parts of the country.

From December 1994 to December 1996, more than 800 employees of rifle and fire brigades of the paramilitary protection of the Ministry of Internal Affairs of Russia performed their duties in the conditions of the armed conflict in the Chechen Republic and the adjacent territories of the Russian Federation classified as a zone of armed conflict, as well as during counter-terrorist operations in the North Caucasus region (since August 1999). Objects protected by paramilitary guards were shelled more than 300 times. During the period of service, the consolidated units suffered losses of personnel killed, wounded and injured. For their courage and heroism, dozens of shooters and commanders were awarded state awards.

In the Russia, since 2000, on the basis of the Federal Law of the Russian Federation of April 14, 1999. No. No. 77-FZ "On Departmental Protection", on the basis of departmental paramilitary protection, Department security system has been created, which is not paramilitary in legal status, in connection with which employees do not serve, but perform work in accordance with the employment contract with the employer. Employees of departmental security are subject to labor legislation. In state paramilitary organizations (Ministry of Defense of Russia, Ministry of Emergency Situations of Russia), paramilitary guards retained the name, being a departmental protection in legal status, and is organizationally included in military units and structural organizations.

=== Paramilitary units as part of the non-departmental police guard ===
On the basis of the resolution of the Council of Ministers of the USSR of October 29, 1952. No. 4633-1835 "On the use in industry, construction and other sectors of the national economy of workers released from departmental protection, to improve the organization of protection of economic facilities of ministries and departments" and the order of the Ministry of Foreign Security Service of the USSR No. 00965 of October 10, 1952 "On the organization in the main police departments of the Ministry of Police of the Ministry of Defence of the Soviet Union of Independent Guard and the introduction of the posts of heads of police departments of the police service for non-departmental protection in the police departments of the Union Republics" was created a non-departmental external guard guard (VNSO) under the bodies of the Ministry of Internal Affairs of the Soviet Union. Guard brigades that guarded trade and economic facilities were transferred to the internal affairs bodies.

The application of the resolution No. 4633-1835 has led to negative consequences in some cases. Thus, the reduction in the number of employees of the paramilitary security of the Ministry of Railways of the USSR eventually affected the deterioration of cargo safety indicators.

Resolution of the Council of Ministers of the Soviet Union of January 24, 1959. No. 93-42 "On streamlining the protection of enterprises, organizations and institutions" instead of numerous types of protection, it was envisaged to establish two types of protection: paramilitary and guard. Pursuant to this document, the Regulations on non-departmental and departmental protection were adopted, which defined the main activities, their rights and obligations, as well as relations with owners.

Resolution of the Council of Ministers of the USSR of February 8, 1965. No. 76-30 "On improving the organization of protection of enterprises, institutions and organizations" the Soviet government for the first time obliged to transfer all facilities located in cities, working settlements and district centers to non-departmental protection. The only exception was the facilities of some ministries and departments, which were allowed to maintain departmental protection if necessary.

On February 18, 1966, the Resolution of the Council of Ministers of the USSR approved the Model Regulation on non-departmental protection under police bodies, which determined that non-departmental protection under police bodies is organized to protect enterprises, construction sites, institutions and organizations located in cities, working settlements and district centers, and consists of paramilitary units designed to protect particularly important and security facilities, and guard units designed to protect other facilities. Non-departmental protection under the police was under the jurisdiction of the ministries of public order of the Union Republics. Paramilitary units of non-departmental security under the police bodies consisted of detachments, individual units, groups and departments, and guard units consisted of brigades. Paramilitary units armed themselves with carbines, rifles, pistols and revolvers.

=== Paramilitary Guard of the Gulag (OGPU-NKVD-MVD) (1930–1956) ===
The militarization of employees guarding prisoners in camps and colonies began after the establishment of the OGPU Camp Management in April 1930 as part of the OGPU The paramilitary staff of the Gulag guard was staffed mainly from demobilized Red Army soldiers and junior commanders of the Red Army and NKVD troops.

The legal status of paramilitary security units employees was determined by the secret instructions of the OGPU-NKVD-MVD. The charters of the service of the OGPU-NKVD-MVD troops, the combined arms regulations of the Red Army determined the rights of the general and official duties of security officers, regulated the garrison, guard and internal service. In terms of their legal and socio-economic situation, the paramilitary security units employees were equated to persons of active military service. For ITL security employees there was a policy of benefits and privileges: in the field of labour land use of agriculture; labour and social insurance; public education; health care, as well as when crossing on railways and waterways; postal; cash benefits; judicial; compulsory insurance; taxes and fees; housing.

In accordance with the "Temporary instructions for the service of paramilitary protection of correctional labor camps of the NKVD of the USSR", approved by the Deputy NKVD of the USSR Chernyshev on 04.03.1939, the tasks of the paramilitary security units were:

- protection of prisoners in camps, sites (points) and at work;
- protection of finished structures, general-purpose warehouses and main bases with material values;
- escorting prisoners to production and other areas of the camp and protecting them at the place of work;
- escorting prisoners outside the camp;
- fight against escapes and search for escaped prisoners;
- suppression of group performances and disobedience of prisoners.

In addition, by the decision of the Soviet government in May 1951, the paramilitary security units of the Gulag was entrusted with other tasks:

- protection of especially dangerous criminals detained in special camps of the Ministry of Internal Affairs, escorting them to production and protection at the workplace;
- protection of camps with convicted war criminals from among former prisoners of war, escorting them to production and guarding them at the workplace.

In order for the paramilitary guard to justify their appointment, the Charter of the paramilitary security defined service as the performance of a combat mission.

In March 1940. The GULAG paramilitary security numbered about 107 thousand people

Interestingly, in a number of camps, proven prisoners, who were called self-guard or self-supervision, were used as paramilitary gunners. As of January 1, 1939, the number of such shooters reached 25 thousand people, by the beginning of 1940 – up to 12,115 people.[The personnel of the self-security were formed from former employees of the OGPU-NKVD, police, former servicemen. Due to the absence or insufficient number of this category of convicts, the camp administration was forced to appoint prisoners for various crimes to serve on duty

The NKVD could attract them to its side only by promising certain benefits for good work. Self-protected prisoners lived in separate barracks in improved living conditions. They were provided primarily with bedding, uniforms, and were credited to all types of allowances. They were allocated separate tables in the common dining room. Food for this category of prisoners was established to the same extent as those working in the workplace and meeting the norm of convicts. In the post-war period, orders were periodically issued prohibiting the use of prisoners in the protection of ITL. However, the shortage of paramilitary security personnel forced the camp administration to use prisoners as self-security shooters throughout the existence of the Gulag.[

...the self-guards were angry with their comrades, caught a formal occasion and shot. And in Parma, Nyroblag's penal business trip, only the Fifty-Eighth sat and the self-guard was from the Fifty-Eighth! Political...

Paramilitary guards have been repeatedly convicted of committing numerous crimes (self-committed shootings, beatings of arrested persons, rape of female prisoners, provoking prisoners to escape with the aim of their subsequent murder and robbery, etc.)

From the first days of the war, the paramilitary guards were transferred to martial law with the barracks of personnel. Of the 135,000 GULAG's 135, VOKhR gunmen, 93,500 people, i.e. 69% of the personnel, were sent to the front. The mobilized were replaced by senior military personnel, limitedly fit for military service, as well as women. Persons aged 20 to 40 were 38% of them, while there were 86% of them before the war. The party-komsomol layer has almost halved. In August 1944, the paramilitary guard of the Gulag numbered 110 thousand people, including 98 thousand ordinary personnel, sergeant – 10 thousand and officer – 2 thousand. The shortage of privates and junior commanders was 6,600 people. A direct consequence of the changes in the protection was a sharp increase in the number of escapes of prisoners, especially bandits and repeat offenders. If in 1940–41 the annual percentage of refugees was 0.37% and increased to 0.47% in 1942, in subsequent years the number of refugees decreases, amounting to the average annual number of prisoners: in 1943 0.22% and in the first half of 1944 only 0.08%.

There are known cases of the uprising of prisoners, in the suppression of which GULAG VOKhR units were involved, for example, the uprising of prisoners of the Lesoreid camp near the village of Ust-Usa (Komi ASSR), which took place in early 1942 and was known as the Ust-Usinsk uprising of 1942.

As of January 1, 1954, the actual number of the paramilitary rifle guard (including the guard service and fire brigade) was 116,356 people.[

As of April 1, 1956, the paramilitary rifle guard of the Gulag of the Ministry of Internal Affairs of the USSR organizationally consisted of 3 departments, 61 guards, 122 detachments, 444 divisions, 2, 150 platoons, 1 training regiment, 3 training detachments, 18 training divisions, 22 training platoons, 4 schools for the training of sergeants-guides of search dogs, 25 catteries of service dog breeding. The number of WOHR by state is 11,2011 people, in fact – 96653. To strengthen the service for the protection of prisoners and search for fugitives, 10,729 service dogs were used in paramilitary protection, including 1,686 search dogs, 1,434 convoys, 7,609 guard dogs.

Taking into account the resolutions of the Central Committee of the CPSU of March 12, 1954 "On the main tasks of the Ministry of Internal Affairs" and of July 10, 1954 "On measures to improve the work of correctional labor camps and colonies of the Ministry of Internal Affairs" on August 13, 1956, the Ministry of Internal Affairs of the USSR issued an order "On the transfer of correctional labor camps of the Ministry of Internal Affairs of the USSR to the subordination of the Ministry of Internal Affairs of the Union Republics – in territoriality".

In accordance with the order of the Ministry of Internal Affairs of the USSR of 27.10.1956 No. 0500, the paramilitary protection of correctional labour camps was renamed the convoy guard of the Ministry of Internal Affairs of the USSR. The order of its acquisition has fundamentally changed. By the decision of the Government, the convoy protection of places of detention began to serve on conscription through the Ministry of Defense of the Soviet Union.

== Uniforms and insignia ==
The personnel of the paramilitary guard were obliged to wear the established uniform and the insignia corresponding to their official position in the performance of their duties.

=== Departmental paramilitary guard ===
Until 1961, each departmental paramilitary guard had its own personal ranks, uniforms and insignia. For example, in 1947, the Ministry of River Fleet of the USSR installed an emblem for paramilitary protection – two cross-crossed rifles at anchor. For the paramilitary guards of the Ministry of Railways, in 1949 the Supreme Soviet of the Soviet Union introduced personal ranks similar to those used in the Soviet Armed Forces (for example, junior sergeant of paramilitary security, colonel of paramilitary guard)

In accordance with the resolution of the Council of Ministers of the Soviet Union of March 14, 1961 No. 219 "On Departmental Paramilitary Protection" from June 1, 1961, a single uniform was introduced for the personnel of most units of the paramilitary security (dark blue with insignia on the buttonholes), the description of which was approved by the State Planning Committee of the USSR on March 18, 1960. The existing uniform was preserved for the personnel of the paramilitary guard of the Ministry of the Navy, the Ministry of Communications of the USSR, the Main Directorate of the Civil Air Fleet under the Council of Ministers of the USSR and paramilitary protection at the river transport facilities of the Union Republics (in the form of clothing of security personnel at river transport facilities, the epuns were replaced with sleeve insignia).

The insignia of the paramilitary security externally resembled the insignia of the Red Army until 1943 (2, 3, 4 triangles on the buttonholes of the younger composition, 1–4 cubes and 1–3 "spales" – for the middle and senior).

== Weapons ==
Paramilitary guard units were armed depending on the tasks and conditions of service. As a rule, paramilitary guards were given small arms adopted in the Armed Forces (Nagant revolver, TT pistol, Mosin rifle and carbine, Simonov's self-loading carbine). Separate paramilitary security units, for example, the paramilitary security unit of the Ministry of Railways for the protection of particularly important objects (railway bridges, tunnels, etc.), were armed with Shpagin submachine guns (PPSh) and Degtyarev (DP) machine guns .

Pistols and revolvers were usually issued to heads of paramilitary security units, senior shifts, employees at internal posts (in buildings and premises), carbines and pistols – shooters at external posts. Certain categories of employees (security of especially important facilities, alarm groups, cargo escort outfits, specialized groups) were armed with Makarov PM pistols and automatic weapons – 7.62-mm Kalashnikov AKM or AKMS assault rifles.

Service dogs were used in the protection of objects and cargo, search for offenders.

== Participation of paramilitary protection in the life of society ==
At the expense of paramilitary guards of the Stalin (now Donetsk) region of Ukraine, an aircraft "Polikarpov I-3" was built with the inscription on board: "SHOOT VOKhR STALINSHCHYNA". This machine was part of the 5th Air Brigade of the Kiev Military District. The plane was piloted by pilot Kirill Snegurov (1928)

== Reflection in culture and art ==
About the GULAG paramilitary security:

- Leonid Filatov's poem "Pensioners" ("Old VOKHry are sitting at the dachas.");
- Alexander Solzhenitsyn Gulag Archipelago. Part three "Shun and labor." Chapter 20 "Dog Service."
- Ivan Chistyakov, "The Siberian Far Side" is a diary of the BAM security guard from 1935 to 1936, published in 2014.

About the military guard of the IPU:

- Stanislav Govorukhin's documentary film "The Great Criminal Revolution", 1994 (a plot about the theft of goods at the station. Zabaikalsk);
- The first monument to a service dog named "Antey" in the USSR was erected at the Inskaya station, who served with his guide I. Litvinov.

== See also ==
- Red Guards
- Internal Troops
