= Department security in Russia =

Departmental security in Russia (Russian: Ведомственная охрана) is a type of specialized state and non-state industry and departmental armed units similar to security police, designed to protect buildings, structures, facilities, adjacent territories and water areas, vehicles, as well as cargo, including during their transportation, cash and other property from illegal encroachments and fires. They have the right to use combat and service firearms, as well as special means (service dogs, handcuffs, rubber truncheons, means of stopping vehicles). Officials of the state departmental security (created by federal government agencies) have the right to draw up protocols on administrative offenses, carry out personal searches, searches of things in the possession of an individual, searches of vehicles and other procedural actions established by the Code of the Russian Federation on Administrative Offenses. The main position of employees of the departmental security of federal government agencies is "Shooter" (Russian: Стрелок) and "Controller" (Russian: Контролёр). In the period from 1918 to 1999, in the Soviet Union and following its dissolution in Russia, a number of state ministries, organizations, institutions, industrial and transport enterprises, and military units had the right to independently protect property, for which purpose civilian employees were included in the staff who guarded important objects and cargo, including those with firearms, hence the name Departmental paramilitary security (VOKhR). Since 1999, in connection with the liquidation of the paramilitary security system and the publication of Federal Law No. 77-FZ of April 14, 1999 "On Departmental Security", the name "departmental security" has been used in the Russian Federation. Unlike paramilitary security, departmental security is not a paramilitary formation.

== History ==
=== Background ===
During the Soviet period, in order to protect property from illegal attacks, various government departments (economic councils, executive committees of the Soviets of Workers' Deputies, ministries, enterprises, institutions, organizations, etc.) had the right to employ armed civilians (guards, watchmen) or create specialized departmental armed units, which over time began to be generally called industrial security, departmental security. From 1924 to 1999, paramilitary security units such as VOKhR operated in the Soviet Union and Russia.

=== Modern period ===
Since 1999, the activities of departmental security have been regulated by Federal Law No. 77-FZ of April 14, 1999 "On Departmental Security".

Federal Law No. 77-FZ of April 14, 1999 "On Departmental Security" established that federal executive bodies have the right to create only state departmental security. Federal law may establish federal state bodies that are not federal executive bodies, organizations that have the right to create departmental security (Article 5).

From 1999 to 2003, departmental security was a structural subdivision of the ministries. Since 2003, in connection with the ongoing administrative reform, most departmental security was transformed into legal entities under the jurisdiction of the relevant federal ministries and agencies.

As of the beginning of 2017, two departmental security systems have actually been created in Russia: state (about 120 thousand people, excluding the Ministry of Defense of Russia) and non-state (more than 60 thousand people).

By the Order of the Government of Russia of 11 February 2005 No. 66 "Reforming the Non-Departmental Security of the Ministry of Internal Affairs of Russia", as a result of reforming the non-departmental security, the Federal State Unitary Enterprise "Security of the Ministry of Internal Affairs of Russia" (since 2016, the Federal State Unitary Enterprise Security of the Russian National Guard) was created to provide services for the protection of facilities of various forms of ownership.

== State departmental security of federal government bodies ==
By the Resolution of the Russian Government of 12 July 2000 No. 514 "On the organization of departmental security", a list of federal executive bodies entitled to create state departmental security was approved.

As of February 2020, the following 6 federal executive bodies, from those specified in the list, created state departmental security:

- Ministry of Emergency Situations. Number of personnel: 646 people.
- Ministry of Defence - since 2000, departmental security has been created as part of military units and organizations of the Armed Forces of the Russian Federation and consists of paramilitary security units used to protect especially important and sensitive facilities, and guard security units used to protect other facilities. The number is not disclosed.
- Ministry of Finance — created on 19.08.2002 (according to the Unified State Register of Legal Entities) federal state institution "State institution "Departmental security of the Ministry of Finance of the Russian Federation". Number of people 6608 people.
- Ministry of Transport — in 2002, the Federal State Unitary Enterprise "Departmental Security Directorate of the Ministry of Transport of the Russian Federation" was created, number of people - 14082 people in 12 branches.
- Federal Agency of Railway Transport — FGP "Departmental security of railway transport of the Russian Federation" was created in 2003 on the basis of the previously existing paramilitary security of the Ministry of Railways (date of creation December 9, 1921). It is a strategic enterprise and the largest legal entity among departmental security organizations in the Russian Federation, numbering about 65 thousand people.
- Federal Agency for State Reserves - The departmental security of Rosrezerv consists of separate departmental security teams that were created in the organizations of the state reserve system and are structural divisions of these organizations. Number of people: 4,615 people.
- The Ministry of Construction, Housing and Utilities and the Ministry of Regional Development have not created departmental security (excluded from the List). In January 2017, the Ministry of Industry and Trade transferred departmental security to the Federal State Unitary Enterprise "Okhrana" of the Russian National Guard.

In November 2017, the Regulation on departmental security of the Ministry of Culture was approved. As of November 27, 2018, there is no data in the Unified State Register of Legal Entities on the creation.

=== Ministry of Defense ===
In the summer of 2009, the Minister of Defense Anatoly Serdyukov considered the issue of creating OAO Oboronokhrana as a management company for the purpose of attracting private security organizations to protect the facilities of the Ministry of Defense of the Russian Federation. The working group presented a full package of documents for the creation of the said OAO. In March 2010, the Minister of Defense decided to abandon the protection of facilities by private security organizations due to their weak armament. It was proposed to create OAO Oboronokhrana as an independent security structure.

The Minister of Defense reviewed the submitted documents on the creation of the strategic OAO Oboronokhrana and instructed to coordinate them with the departments of the Ministry of Defense. In early May 2010, it was proposed to create a military police and transfer the protection of facilities to it.

In 2011, the directive of the Chief of the General Staff of the Russian Armed Forces ordered to consider the option of protecting military educational institutions by private security organizations. At the same time, private security guards were already working in medical institutions of the Russian Ministry of Defense.

The liquidation of paramilitary security units had a negative impact on the safety of the Russian Ministry of Defense property. Thus, as a result of the reduction of the paramilitary security detachment (104 people), carried out in November 2009, there were not enough forces to extinguish the fire that broke out in the summer of 2010 at the Russian Navy aviation and technical base 2512 in the Moscow Oblast. Sixteen storage facilities, a club building and several auxiliary buildings burned down.

In 2011, the Military Police of Russia was created, whose tasks include, among other things, ensuring the protection of Russian Armed Forces facilities, the list of which is determined by the Minister of Defense, service premises of the military prosecutor's office and military investigative bodies.

== Departmental security of other legal entities ==
The creation of departmental security of state corporations and other legal entities became possible due to the targeted activities of legislators, who did not provide for the creation of state enterprises and state institutions by state corporations.

- State corporation Rostec — JSC RT-Okhrana (formerly ZAO RT-Okhrana) — the first non-state departmental security in Russia (according to the Unified State Register of Legal Entities dated 21.07.2010), is part of the holding company JSC SIBER. The number of employees is 9911 people.
- State Corporation Rosatom - in 2003, FSUE Atom-okhrana was created, which was transformed into Joint-Stock Company Departmental Security of Rosatom (according to the Unified State Register of Legal Entities dated March 23, 2019). The structure of JSC Atom-okhrana includes 6 Interregional Departmental Security Directorates, which protect facilities located in 37 constituent entities of the Russian Federation. The number of people is more than 9.5 thousand people.
- Roscosmos — the corporation, created in August 2015, included the Federal State Unitary Enterprise Scientific and Technical Center Okhrana (created on October 18, 1991), which had been under the jurisdiction of the Federal Space Agency since 2001. On May 3, 2018, the Federal State Unitary Enterprise Scientific and Technical Center "Okhrana" was transformed into the Joint-Stock Company. Number of employees: 5,386 people.
- Government of Moscow — LLC ChOO Stolichnaya Bezopasnost (according to the Unified State Register of Legal Entities — since October 13, 2011). It is the only security service created by the executive body of the subject and local government in the form of private security, in accordance with Article 15.1 of the Law of the Russian Federation “On Private Detective and Security Activities in the Russian Federation” and Part 2 Rules for granting the right to establish a private security organization by a legal entity carrying out activities other than security" approved by the Government of the Russian Federation dated 24.02.2010 N 82, which was classified as a strategic city as a strategic enterprise.
- Russian Railways - LLC OP RZhD-Okhrana (according to the Unified State Register of Legal Entities - since 15.12.2009).
- Gazprom - LLC ChOO Gazprom Okhrana (according to the Unified State Register of Legal Entities - since 30.04.2015), Number of employees - 18,597 people.
- Rosneft - LLC RN-Vedestvennaya Okhrana (according to the Unified State Register of Legal Entities - since 23.10.2015), - Number of employees 1,028 people.
- Transneft — OOO Transneft-Okhrana (according to the Unified State Register of Legal Entities — since 10.06.2014). Number of employees — 15,743 people.
- ALROSA (PAO) — 15.05.2018 The Government of Russia approved the Regulation on departmental security, on the basis of which armed security units will be created.
- Central Bank of Russia — Russian Cash Collection Association (ROSINKAS) is partially endowed with the rights of departmental security.

== Means of identification ==
Employees of departmental security are required to perform their job duties in uniform and have a service ID and badge, samples of which have been developed and approved by federal government agencies and organizations that have the right to create departmental security. The use of uniform samples used in state paramilitary organizations (the Ministry of Defense of Russia, the Ministry of Internal Affairs of Russia, etc.) is not permitted.

Uniforms and badges are individual identifiers that allow citizens to visually determine the affiliation of a departmental security employee with persons vested with powers in accordance with the legislation of Russia and exercising them during working hours. Badges are usually made in the form of metal chest badges with an image of the emblem (logo) of the department, organization and serial registration number, with inscriptions indicating affiliation with departmental security.

Depending on the department, traditions and working conditions, uniforms are provided with cockades, lapel badges, sleeve badges, chest badges, shoulder badges (pads), and stripes (chest and back). Official emblems, stars, stripes, and inscriptions are depicted (attached) to the shoulder badges, the rules for the placement of which are regulated by departmental regulations. Insignia are established depending on the positions (professions) of departmental security employees.

In some departmental security services, signs of belonging to the type of transport are used as a chest badge and above-cockade emblem:

- Departmental security of the Ministry of Transport of Russia - "winged wind rose";
- departmental security of Roszheldor - an elliptical wheel with wings;
- On operational vehicles (cars, boats, etc.) belonging to the departmental security, official emblems and logos are placed, inscriptions containing the words "departmental security", abbreviated names of organizations.
