= Gun control in Russia =

Gun control in Russia is carried out in accordance with the Federal Law on Weapons. The law establishes three major categories of weapons: civil, service, and military. Civilians in Russia are able to obtain firearms with proper licensure, with some limits on concealed carry.

== Overview ==
As of 2021 Russian citizens over 21 years of age can obtain a firearms license after attending gun-safety classes and passing a federal test and background check. Firearms may be acquired for self-defense, hunting, or sports activities, as well as for collection purposes.

Carrying permits may be issued for hunting firearms licensed for hunting purposes. Initially, purchases are limited to long smooth-bore firearms and pneumatic weapons with a muzzle energy of up to 25 joules (18 ft⋅lbf). After five years of shotgun ownership, rifles may be purchased. Handguns were generally not allowed, but with the growing popularity of practical shooting events and competitions in Russia in recent years (e.g., IPSC), handgun ownership has now been allowed and you must be 21 years of age, a legal Russian citizen and possess a valid firearms permit. Originally, handguns were only used for sports and competitive shooting, but have recently been allowed for the purposes of self-defense on an owner's property.

As of 2023, handguns using live ammunition are not allowed to be concealed carry in public. The only legal handguns allowed in public are traumatic handguns using rubber bullets, and may be used for the purposes of self-defense. The only exception to this federal law are commemoration pistols, which have special engravings, and these can only be gifted by government officials for acts of heroism. These engraved pistols may use live ammunition and are allowed to be concealed carried, and used for the purposes of self-defense, provided the recipient is 21 years of age or older, and possess a valid firearms permit. Rifles and shotguns with barrels less than 500 mm (20 in) long are prohibited, as are firearms which shoot in bursts or have more than a 10-round capacity. The only exception for the 10-round capacity, is for use on gun ranges. Suppressors are generally prohibited and must receive special government permission. An individual cannot possess more than ten guns (up to five shotguns and up to five rifles, either rifled or smooth-bore) unless they are part of a registered gun collection.

== History of changes ==
In 2014 Russia relaxed its gun laws by simplifying regulations for foreigners who legally bring their firearms to Russia; and making regulations stricter for firearm licensing, safekeeping, and for the purchase of non-lethal firearms.

In July 2016, requirements were updated for registration, licensing, and storage of hunting, sporting, pneumatic, and gas weapons.

In the wake of the Kazan school shooting various proposals for tighter gun control were voiced and a bill drafted earlier and submitted in December 2020 in the State Duma was signed into law in June 2021. The bill restricted the possession of firearms by those under 21, expanded rules requiring owners to report the locations and inspection status of their firearms, and required arms depots to improve security measures to prevent theft of firearms.

== See also ==
- Gun control in the Soviet Union
