= Lennon (name) =

Lennon Ó Lionáin
- Gender: Unisex
- Language: English

Origin
- Language: Irish Gaelic
- Origin: Lennon (surname)
- Meaning: "Cloak", "blackbird", "lover"
- Region of origin: Ireland

Other names
- Variant forms: MacLennon; O'Lennon; O'Lennan; Linnane; Lineen; O'Lonain
- Related names: Lennox, Lenny, Lenn, Len

The name Lennon or Lennan is both a surname and a given name that has grown in popularity in English-speaking countries in recent years for both boys and girls.

Origins include Irish Ó Leannáin ("descendant of Lover (leannán)") and from Ó Lionáin ("descendant of Blackbird (Lonán)").

Notable people and characters with the name include:

== Surname ==
- John Lennon (1940–1980), singer, musician, poet and songwriter, founder of The Beatles
  - Cynthia Lennon (1939–2015), John Lennon's first wife (born Cynthia Powell)
  - Julian Lennon (born 1963), John Lennon's first son with Cynthia Powell
  - Sean Lennon (born 1975), John Lennon's second son with Yoko Ono
  - Alfred Lennon and Julia Lennon, parents of John Lennon
- The Lennon Sisters, four siblings who sang together as part of an act, most notably seen on The Lawrence Welk Show
  - Dianne Lennon, American singer
  - Janet Lennon, American singer
  - Kathy Lennon, American singer
  - Peggy Lennon, American singer
- The members of Venice (band):
  - Kipp Lennon (born 1960), American musician
  - Mark Lennon, American musician
  - Michael Lennon, American musician
  - Pat Lennon, American musician
- Aaron Lennon (born 1987), English footballer
- Alton Lennon, Democratic U.S. senator from the state of North Carolina
- Ben Lennon, Australian rules footballer
- Bill Lennon (1845–1910), American baseball player
- Bruce Lennon, Australian rules footballer
- Caroline Lennon, Irish actor
- Dennis Lennon (1918–1991), British architect and interior designer
- Harry Lennon (born 1994), English footballer
- Jimmy Lennon (1913–1992), American boxing ring announcer (Jimmy Lennon Sr or Jr)
- John Lennon (disambiguation), several people
- J. Robert Lennon, American novelist, short story writer, musician and composer
- Joseph Lennon (1933–1990), Irish politician
- Keith Lennon, character from Magical DoReMi
- Mark Lennon (born 1980), Australian rugby player
- Michael Lennon (disambiguation), several people
- Monica Lennon, Scottish politician
- Neil Lennon (born 1971), Northern Irish footballer
- Patrick Lennon (disambiguation), several people
- Paul Lennon (born 1955), Australian politician
- Peter Lennon (1930–2011), Irish journalist and filmmaker
- Richard Lennon (1947–2019), American Roman Catholic bishop
- Robert L. Lennon (1933–2021), American politician
- Stephen Lennon, guitarist in The Questions
- Stephen Yaxley-Lennon (born 1982), British political activist, known as Tommy Robinson
- Steven Lennon (born 1988), Scottish footballer
- Thomas Lennon (disambiguation), several people
- William Lennon (1849–1938), politician in Queensland, Australia

== Given name ==
- Lennon (Brazilian footballer)
- Lennon Dobson (born 2006), English professional footballer
- Lennon Gallagher (born 1999), British model and musician and son of Liam Gallagher
- Lennon Greggains (born 1999), Welsh rugby player
- Lennon Lacy (died 2014), American student and alleged murder victim
- Lennon Miller (born 2006), Scottish footballer
- Lennon Murphy (born 1982), American rock singer
- Lennon Parham (born 1975), American actress and comedian
- Lennon Stella (born 1999), Canadian singer and actress
- Lennon Thompson, Canadian soccer player

== See also ==
- Lennon (disambiguation)
- Lenin (disambiguation)
