= Q-Pop =

Q-Pop or QPOP may refer to:

- Q-pop (Qazaq pop), a music genre originating in Kazakhstan
- Q-pop (Quechua pop), a K-pop inspired music genre originating in South America.
- quadratic phenotypic optimization platform (QPOP), a type of personalized medicine artificial intelligence used in phenotypic response surfaces
- Q-Pop, a fictional character from Liv and Maddie, a fictional hip-hop dance instructor
- "Q-Pop", a 2013 art exhibition in Los Angeles by Layron DeJarnette
- #Q-Pop, a Qazaq pop programming segment on Kazakhstan music channel Gakku TV

== See also ==
- KPOP (disambiguation)
- CPOP (disambiguation)
