= Lenon =

Lenon may refer to:

- Barnaby Lenon (born 1954), British schoolmaster
- Edmund Henry Lenon (1838–1893), British Army officer
- Paris Lenon (born 1977), American football player in the National Football League
- Trudi Lenon, Australian murderer
- Lenon (footballer, born 1990), Lenon Fernandes Ribeiro, Brazilian football defensive midfielder

== See also ==
- Lennon (disambiguation)
- Lenin (disambiguation)
- Lemon (disambiguation)
