= William J. Donovan =

American lawyer, soldier and diplomat (1883–1959)

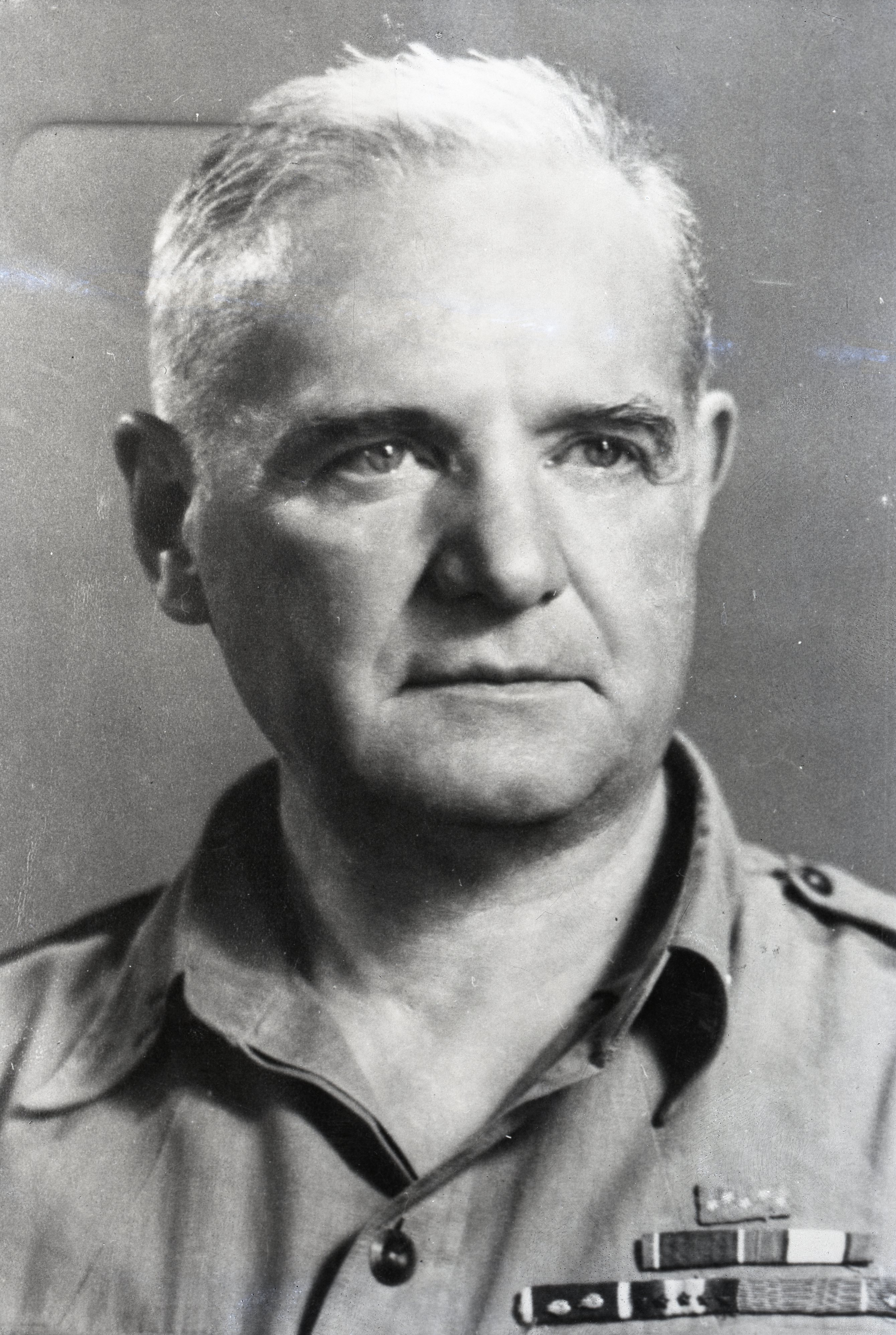
- Donovan in 1945

United States Ambassador to Thailand
- In office September 4, 1953 – August 21, 1954
- President: Dwight D. Eisenhower
- Preceded by: Edwin F. Stanton
- Succeeded by: John Peurifoy

Director of the Office of Strategic Services
- In office June 13, 1942 – October 1, 1945
- President: Franklin D. Roosevelt; Harry S. Truman
- Preceded by: Himself (as Coordinator of Information)
- Succeeded by: John Magruder (as Director of the Strategic Services Unit)

Coordinator of Information
- In office July 11, 1941 – June 13, 1942
- President: Franklin D. Roosevelt
- Preceded by: Position established
- Succeeded by: Himself (as Director of the Office of Strategic Services)

Assistant Attorney General for the Antitrust Division
- In office 1926–1927
- President: Calvin Coolidge
- Preceded by: Position established
- Succeeded by: John Lord O'Brian

Assistant Attorney General for the Criminal Division
- In office 1924–1925
- President: Calvin Coolidge
- Preceded by: Earl J. Davis

United States Attorney for the Western District of New York
- In office 1922–1924
- President: Warren G. Harding
- Preceded by: Stephen T. Lockwood
- Succeeded by: Thomas Penney Jr.

Personal details
- Born: William Joseph Donovan; January 1, 1883 Buffalo, New York, U.S.
- Died: February 8, 1959 (aged 76) Washington, D.C., U.S.
- Resting place: Arlington National Cemetery
- Party: Republican
- Education: Niagara University; Columbia University (BA, LLB)
- Civilian awards: National Security Medal; Freedom Award
- Nickname: "Wild Bill"

Military service
- Allegiance: United States
- Branch/service: United States Army; New York National Guard; Army Reserve; Office of the Coordinator of Information; Office of Strategic Services
- Years of service: 1912–1917 (National Guard); 1917–1919 (active); 1919–1941 (reserve); 1941–1945 (active)
- Rank: Major General
- Commands: 1st Battalion, 165th Infantry Regiment; 165th Infantry Regiment; 301st Cavalry Regiment
- Battles/wars: Pancho Villa Expedition; World War I; Champagne-Marne; Aisne-Marne; St. Mihiel; Meuse-Argonne; Defensive Sector; Russian Civil War; Allied intervention; World War II; American Theater; Asiatic-Pacific Theater; Mediterranean and Middle East theatre; European theatre
- Military awards: Medal of Honor; Distinguished Service Cross; Army Distinguished Service Medal (2); Silver Star; Purple Heart (3)

William Joseph "Wild Bill" Donovan (January 1, 1883 – February 8, 1959) was an American soldier, lawyer, intelligence officer and diplomat. He is best known for serving as the head of the Office of Strategic Services (OSS), the precursor to the Bureau of Intelligence and Research and the Central Intelligence Agency (CIA), during World War II. He is regarded as the founding father of the CIA, and a statue of him stands in the lobby of the CIA headquarters building in Langley, Virginia.

A veteran of World War I, Donovan is believed to be the only person to have been awarded all four of the following decorations: the Medal of Honor, the Distinguished Service Cross, the Distinguished Service Medal, and the National Security Medal. He is also a recipient of the Silver Star and Purple Heart, as well as decorations from a number of other nations for his service during both World Wars.

== Early life ==
Of Irish descent, Donovan was born in Buffalo, New York, to Anna Letitia "Tish" Donovan (née Lennon) and Timothy P. Donovan, both American-born children of Irish immigrants. The Lennons were from Ulster and the Donovans from County Cork. Donovan's grandfather, Timothy O'Donovan Sr., was from the town of Skibbereen; raised by an uncle who was a parish priest, he married Donovan's grandmother Mary Mahoney, who belonged to a propertied family of substantial means that disapproved of him. They first moved to Canada and then to Buffalo, where they dropped the "O" from their name. Donovan's father, born in 1858, worked as the superintendent of a Buffalo railroad yard, as secretary for Holy Cross Cemetery, and attempted to engage in a political career with little success.

Donovan was born on New Year's Day in 1883. (Named William, he chose his middle name, Joseph, at the time of his confirmation.) He had two younger brothers and two younger sisters who survived into adulthood and several additional younger siblings who died in infancy or childhood. "From Anna's side of the family came style and etiquette and the dreams of poets," Donovan's biographer, Douglas Waller, wrote. "From Tim came toughness and duty and honor to country and clan." Donovan attended St. Joseph's Collegiate Institute, a Catholic institution at which he played football, acted in plays, and won an award for oratory. He went on to Niagara University, a Catholic university and seminary where he undertook a pre-law major. Considering the priesthood, he ultimately decided "he wasn't good enough to be a priest," although he did win another oratorical contest, this time with a speech warning of corrupt, anti-Christian forces that threatened the United States.

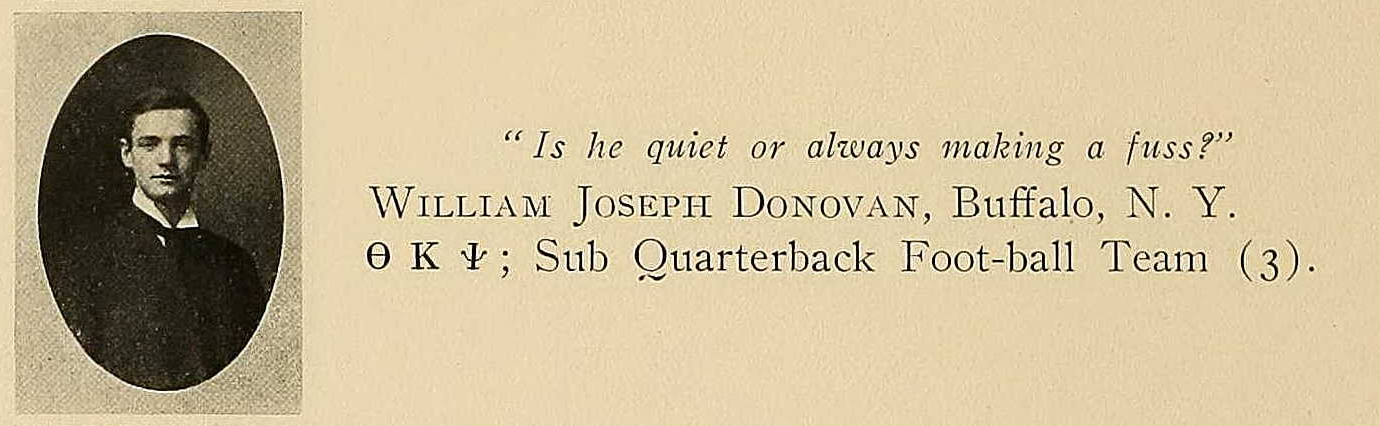
Donovan in the Columbia University yearbook, 1905

With the expectation of studying law, Donovan eventually transferred to Columbia University, where he looked beyond "Catholic dogma" and attended Protestant and Jewish worship services to decide whether he wanted to change religions. He joined the Phi Kappa Psi fraternity, rowed on varsity crew, again won a prize for oratory, was a campus football hero, and was voted the "most modest" and one of the "handsomest" members of the graduating class of 1905.

After earning his bachelor of arts, Donovan spent two years at Columbia Law School, where he was a classmate of Franklin D. Roosevelt, and studied under Harlan Fiske Stone. Returning to Buffalo, he joined the respected law firm of Love & Keating in 1909 and, two years later, opened his own Buffalo firm in partnership with a Columbia classmate, Bradley Goodyear. In 1914, their firm merged with another, becoming Goodyear & O'Brien. In 1912, Donovan helped form, and became the leader of, a troop of cavalry of the New York National Guard. This unit was mobilized in 1916 and served on the U.S.–Mexico border during the American government's campaign against Pancho Villa. He studied military strategy and combat tactics. He also took acting courses in New York City from a stage star of the day, Eleanor Robson. In 1914, he married Ruth Rumsey, a Buffalo heiress who had attended Rosemary Hall.

In 1916, Donovan spent several months in Berlin on behalf of the Rockefeller Foundation, seeking to persuade the governments of Britain and Germany to allow the shipment of food and clothing into Belgium, Serbia, and Poland. In July of that year, at the behest of the State Department, he returned to the U.S. and took his cavalry troop to the Texas border to join Brigadier General John J. Pershing's army in the hunt for Pancho Villa. Promoted to major in the field, he returned to Buffalo, then joined the 69th Regiment, also known as the "Fighting Irish Regiment." This was the same 69th of Civil War fame, later called the 165th, which was training for America's expected entry into World War I, and which became part of the 42nd Division, also known as the "Rainbow Division." Douglas MacArthur was the 42nd Division's chief of staff. Donovan's son David was born in 1915, and a daughter, Patricia, was born in 1917. (Patricia died in an accident in 1940.)

== World War I ==
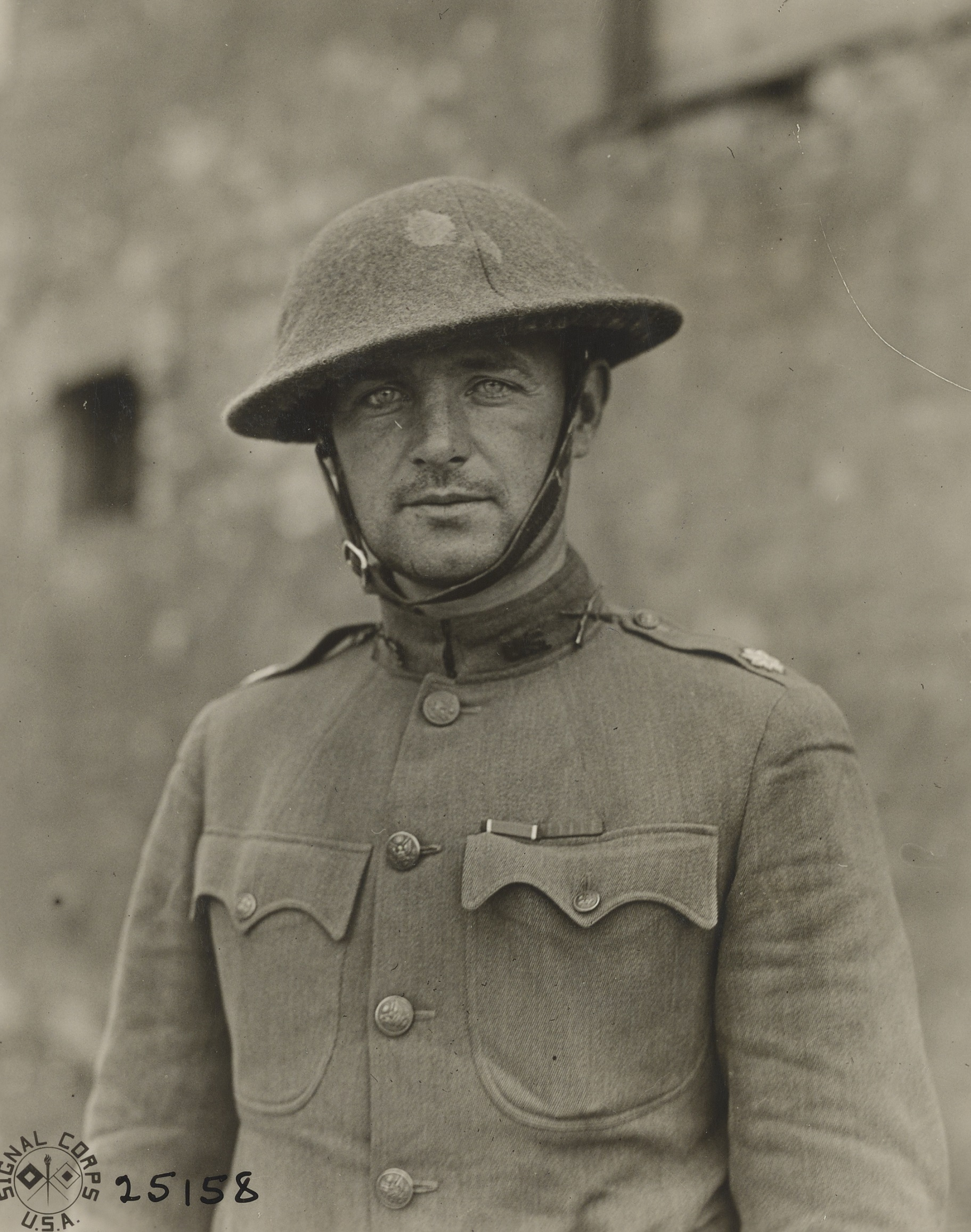
Lieutenant Colonel William J. Donovan in uniform, September 6, 1918

During World War I, Major Donovan led the 1st Battalion, 165th Infantry of the 42nd Division. Serving in France, he suffered a shrapnel wound in one leg and was almost blinded by gas. After performing a rescue under fire, he was offered the Croix de Guerre, but turned it down because a Jewish soldier who had taken part in the rescue had not also been awarded the honor. After that insult had been corrected, Donovan accepted the distinction. He was awarded the Distinguished Service Cross for leading an assault during the Aisne-Marne campaign, in which hundreds of members of his regiment died, including his acting adjutant, the poet Joyce Kilmer. The 1940 James Cagney movie, The Fighting 69th, dramatised the events of this battle and the 69th Infantry Regiment's role in it.

Donovan's remarkable level of endurance, which far exceeded that of the much younger soldiers under his command, led those men to give him the nickname "Wild Bill", which stuck with him for the rest of his life. Although he "professed annoyance with the nickname", his wife "knew that deep down he loved it".

Assigned commanding officer of the 165th Regiment, Donovan fought in another battle that took place near Landres-et-Saint-Georges on October 14–15, 1918. Going into battle, Donovan "ignored the officers' custom of covering or stripping off insignia of rank (targets for snipers) and instead sallied forth wearing his medals", according to Evan Thomas. "They can't hit me and they won't hit you!" he told his men. Struck in the knee by a bullet, he "refused to be evacuated and continued to direct his men until even American tanks were turning back under withering German fire". After lobbying by his friend, Father Francis P. Duffy, a famous and widely revered Army chaplain, Donovan was awarded an Oak Leaf Cluster of the Distinguished Service Cross (i.e., a second DSC) for his service in that battle. After the Armistice of November 11, 1918, Donovan remained in Europe as part of the occupation. On returning to New York in April 1919, Donovan, now a colonel, was widely discussed as a possible candidate for governor, but he rejected the idea, proclaiming his intention to return to Buffalo and resume the practice of law.

=== Medal of Honor citation ===
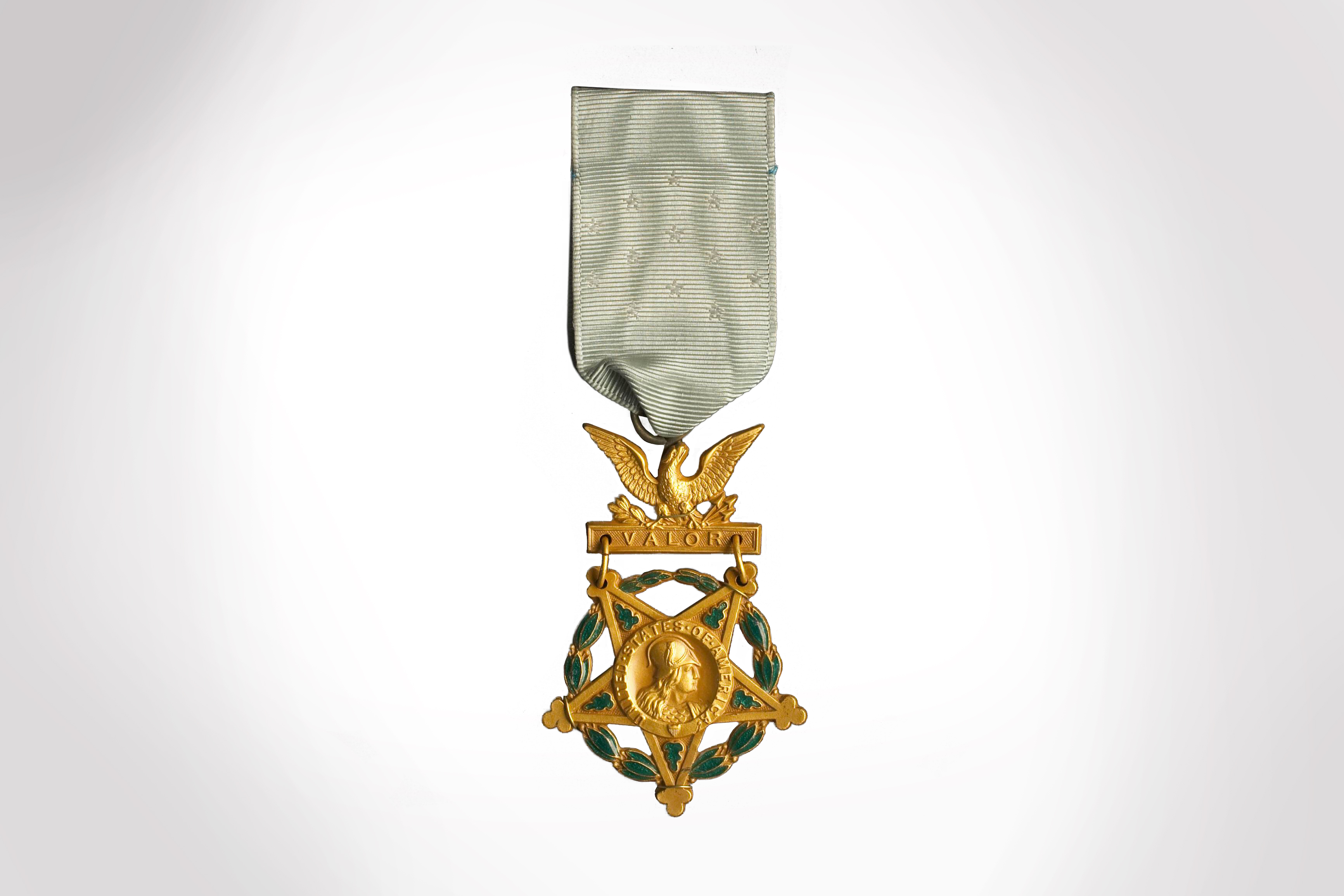
Medal of Honor presented to Donovan, in the collection of the CIA Museum

Medal of Honor AWARDED FOR ACTIONS DURING World War I

Service: Army

Division: 42d Division

GENERAL ORDERS: War Department, General Orders No. 56, December 30, 1922

CITATION: The President of the United States of America, in the name of Congress, takes pleasure in presenting the Medal of Honor to Lieutenant Colonel (Infantry) William Joseph "Wild Bill" Donovan (ASN: 0-102383), United States Army, for extraordinary heroism on 14 and 15 October 1918, while serving as Commanding Officer, 165th Infantry, 42d Division, American Expeditionary Forces, in action at Landres-et-St. Georges, France. Lieutenant Colonel Donovan personally led the assaulting wave in an attack upon a very strongly organized position, and when our troops were suffering heavy casualties he encouraged all near him by his example, moving among his men in exposed positions, reorganizing decimated platoons, and accompanying them forward in attacks. When he was wounded in the leg by machine-gun bullets, he refused to be evacuated and continued with his unit until it withdrew to a less exposed position.

=== Distinguished Service Cross citation ===
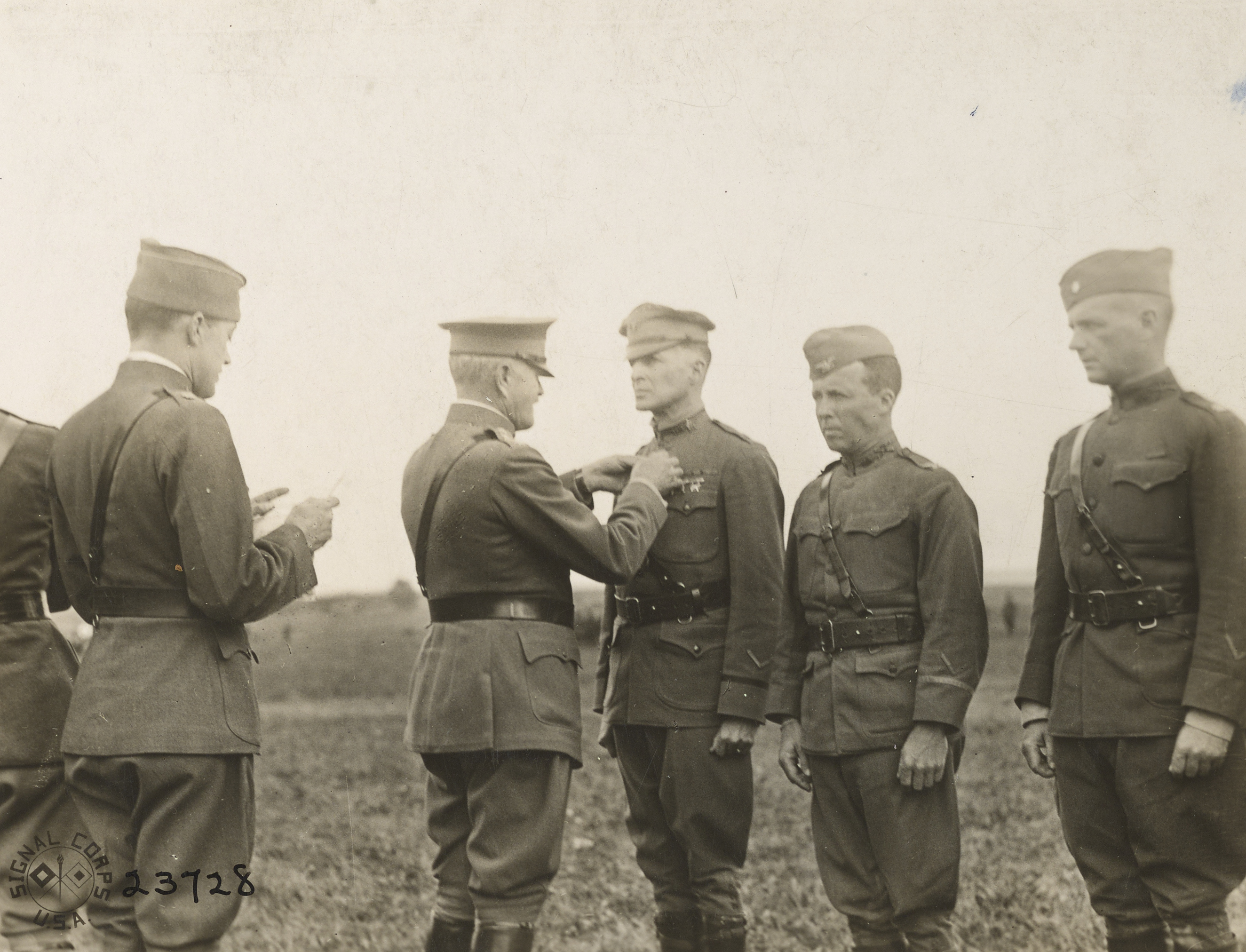
General John J. Pershing decorates Brigadier General Douglas MacArthur (third from left) with the Distinguished Service Cross in late 1918. Major General Charles T. Menoher (furthest left) reads out the citation while Colonel George E. Leach (fourth from left) and Lieutenant Colonel William J. Donovan (right) await their decorations.

AWARDED FOR ACTIONS DURING World War I

Service: Army

GENERAL ORDERS: War Department, General Orders 71 (1919)

CITATION: The President of the United States of America, authorized by Act of Congress, July 9, 1918, takes pleasure in presenting the Distinguished Service Cross to Colonel (Infantry) William Joseph "Wild Bill" Donovan (ASN: 0-102383), United States Army, for extraordinary heroism in action while serving with 165th Infantry Regiment, 42d Division, A.E.F., near Villers-sur-Fere, France, July 28–31, 1918. Colonel Donovan led his battalion across the River Ourcq and captured important enemy strong holds. He was in advance of the division for four days, all the while under shell and machine-gun fire from the enemy, who were on three sides of him, and he was repeatedly and persistently counter-attacked, being wounded twice. Colonel Donovan's coolness and efficient leadership rendered possible the maintenance of this position.

=== Army Distinguished Service Medal citation ===
AWARDED FOR ACTIONS DURING World War I

Service: Army

GENERAL ORDERS: War Department, General Orders No. 43 (1922)

CITATION: The President of the United States of America, authorized by Act of Congress, July 9, 1918, takes pleasure in presenting the Army Distinguished Service Medal to Colonel (Infantry) William Joseph "Wild Bill" Donovan (ASN: 0-102383), United States Army, for exceptionally meritorious and distinguished services to the Government of the United States, in a duty of great responsibility during World War I. As Battalion Commander of the 165th Infantry Regiment, 42d Division, during its operations in the Baccarat Sector from 28 to 31 July 1918, Colonel Donovan demonstrated high professional attainments and marked ability. He displayed conspicuous energy and most efficient leadership in the advance of his battalion across the Ourcq River and the capture of strong enemy positions. In October 1918, as Lieutenant Colonel he commanded the same regiment with marked success and distinction in the Meuse-Argonne offensive. His devotion to duty, heroism, and pronounced qualities of a commander enabled him to successfully accomplish all missions assigned to him in this important operation. From 3 January to 3 March 1919, as Inspector Instructor, Provost Marshall General's Department, he rendered services of great value to the American Expeditionary Forces.

== Interwar years ==
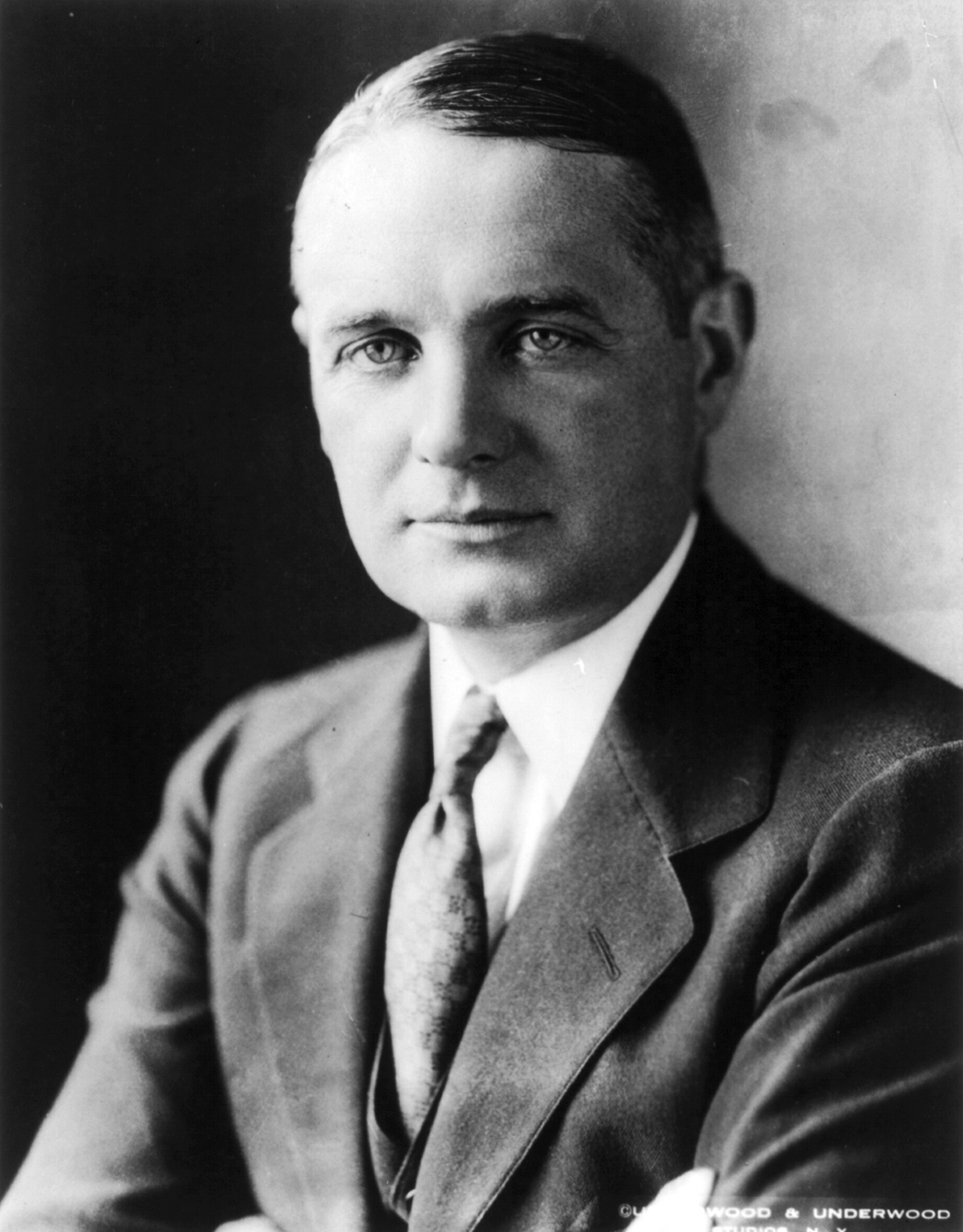
Donovan in 1924, during his time with the Department of Justice

Following his return to the U.S., Donovan took his wife on a combined vacation, business trip, and intelligence mission to Japan, China, and Korea, then went on alone to Siberia during the Russian Civil War. He went back to work at his law firm, but also took an extensive journey to Europe, where he did business on behalf of J. P. Morgan and gathered intelligence about international Communism.

From 1922 to 1924, while maintaining his private law practice, he also served as U.S. Attorney for the Western District of New York. A high point came in 1923, when, as a result of continued pressure from Father Duffy, Donovan was finally awarded the Medal of Honor for his heroic acts in the battle at Landres-et-Saint-Georges. Presented with the medal at a New York City ceremony that was attended by about four thousand veterans, Donovan refused to keep it, saying that it belonged not to him but "to the boys who are not here, the boys who are resting under the white crosses in France or in the cemeteries of New York, also to the boys who were lucky enough to come through.

As US Attorney, he was becoming well known as a vigorous crime-fighter. He was especially famous (and, in some circles, notorious) for his energetic enforcement of Prohibition. There were a number of threats to assassinate him and to dynamite his home, but he was not deterred. The climax of his war on alcohol came in August 1923, when his agents raided Buffalo's upmarket Saturn Club (of which Donovan himself was a member) and confiscated large amounts of illegal liquor. The club's members, who formed much of the city's upper crust, were outraged, having assumed that Prohibition did not apply to people such as themselves. Some regarded Donovan as a traitor to their class, and recalled that Donovan had not, after all, been born to high station but was, in fact, an Irish Catholic who had married into the world of privileged, professional Protestants. Donovan's law partner, Goodyear, quit their firm in anger over the raid, and Donovan's own wife never forgave him for it. Many working class residents of Buffalo cheered the raid as an example of equal justice under the law, however.

In 1924, when President Calvin Coolidge cleaned house at the Department of Justice in the wake of the late President Warren G. Harding's Teapot Dome scandal, he appointed Donovan's former professor Harlan Stone as Attorney General and named Donovan as Stone's assistant, in charge of the criminal division. Donovan and his wife split their time between Washington and Buffalo, where he continued to run his law firm. At the Justice Department, Donovan hired women and eschewed yes-men. He and his wife became a popular Washington couple, although Donovan's relationship with the acting Director of the Bureau of Investigation, J. Edgar Hoover, briefly one of his underlings, was fraught with friction.

When Stone was appointed to the Supreme Court in 1925, Donovan was put in charge of the Department of Justice's antitrust division, often serving as de facto Attorney General during the frequent absences of Stone's successor, John Garibaldi Sargent. Donovan was admired for his energetic and effective arguments before the Supreme Court, and was a favorite off-the-record source for the Washington press corps. He was talked up as a possible candidate for Governor of New York in 1926 and for the Vice Presidency in 1928; Herbert Hoover promised to make him Attorney General if Hoover won the Presidency in 1928, but instead, under the influence of anti-Catholic Southerners, among others, Hoover ended up offering him the governorship of the Philippines, a post Donovan turned down.

Resigning from the Department of Justice in 1929, Donovan moved to New York City and formed a new law firm, Donovan, Leisure, Newton & Irvine, in partnership with Frank Raichle. Despite the stock market crash, he made a success of handling many of the mergers and acquisitions and bankruptcies that then resulted; he also acquired celebrity clients, such as Mae West and Jane Wyman.

Donovan ran on the Republican line in the 1932 state election to succeed Franklin D. Roosevelt as Governor of New York. Assisting Donovan in his campaign was journalist James J. Montague, who served as "personal adviser and campaign critic". But despite Donovan's offstage charm and force, he proved to be an uninspiring campaigner on the stump. He ran a disorganized, strategy-free campaign, and in the end lost to the Democratic nominee, Herbert Lehman.

== World War II ==
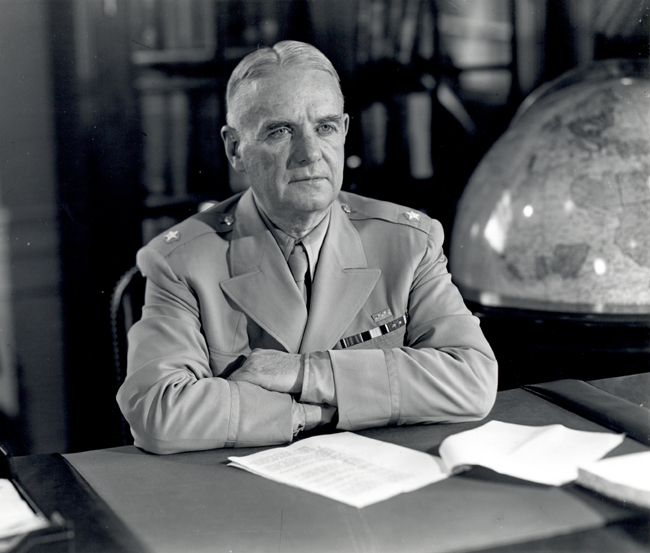
Donovan at his desk c. 1945

During the interwar years, as "part of an informal network of American businessmen and lawyers who closely tracked and collected intelligence on foreign affairs," Donovan traveled extensively in Europe and Asia, "establishing himself as a player in international affairs – and honing his skills as an intelligence gatherer overseas." He met with such foreign leaders as Benito Mussolini, with whom he discussed World War I, the expansionist ideology of Italian Fascism, and Roosevelt's prospects for re-election in 1936. Mussolini granted Donovan permission to visit the Italian front in Ethiopia, where he found Italy's military much improved since the war and predicted an Italian victory. Donovan also made connections with leading figures in Nazi Germany. He was no friend of the dictators, publicly assailing Hitler, Mussolini, and Stalin as totalitarians and taking steps to protect his Jewish clients in Europe from the Nazis.

Donovan openly believed during this time that a second major European war was inevitable. His foreign experience and realism earned him the friendship of President Roosevelt, notwithstanding their extreme differences in domestic policy and despite the fact that Donovan, during the 1932 election campaign, had harshly criticized Roosevelt's record as Governor of New York. The two men were from opposing political parties, but were similar in personality. Roosevelt respected Donovan's experience, felt that Hoover had done Donovan wrong on the Attorney General appointment, and believed that if Donovan had been a Democrat he could have been elected president. Also, Donovan's national profile had risen considerably thanks to the 1940 Warner Brothers film The Fighting 69th, in which Pat O'Brien played Father Duffy and George Brent played Donovan, and Roosevelt recognized a useful opportunity to exploit Donovan's newfound popularity. As the two men began exchanging notes about developments abroad, Roosevelt recognized that Donovan could be an important ally and adviser.

Roosevelt came to place great value on Donovan's insight. Following Germany's and the USSR's invasions of Poland in September 1939 and the start of World War II in Europe, President Roosevelt began to put the United States on a war footing. This was a crisis of the sort that Donovan had predicted, and he sought out a responsible place in the wartime infrastructure. On the recommendation of Donovan's friend, Secretary of the Navy Frank Knox, Roosevelt gave him a number of increasingly important assignments. In 1940 and 1941, Donovan traveled as an informal emissary to Britain, where he was urged by Knox and Roosevelt to gauge Britain's ability to withstand Germany's aggression.

During these trips, Donovan met with key officials in the British war effort, including Winston Churchill and the directors of Britain's intelligence services. He also had lunch with King George VI. Donovan and Churchill got along famously, sharing war stories and reciting in unison the nineteenth-century poem "The Cavalier's Song" by William Motherwell. Impressed by Donovan and cheered by his eagerness to help Britain, Churchill ordered that he be given unlimited access to classified information. Donovan returned to the U.S. confident of Britain's chances and enamored of the possibility of founding an American intelligence service modeled on that of the British. He strongly urged Roosevelt to give Churchill the aid he requested. Roosevelt wanted to provide such aid, and asked Donovan to use his knowledge of the law to figure out how to skirt the congressional ban on selling armaments to the United Kingdom.

British diplomats, who shared Churchill's admiration for Donovan, expressed the wish to State Department officials that Donovan replace U.S. Ambassador to Britain Joseph P. Kennedy, who favored the appeasers and was defeatist regarding British prospects. In the view of Walter Lippmann, a political columnist, Donovan's findings about Britain's fighting capability "almost singlehandedly overcame the unmitigated defeatism which was paralyzing Washington." Donovan also examined U.S. naval defenses in the Pacific (which he found wanting) and visited several countries along the Mediterranean and in the Middle East, serving as an unofficial envoy for both the U.S. and Britain and urging leaders there to stand up to the Nazis. He also met frequently in New York with British Security Co-ordination head William Stephenson, a spy for MI6 who was known as "Intrepid", and Stephenson's deputy, Australian-born MI6 intelligence officer Dick Ellis, who has been credited with writing the blueprint for Donovan's new American intelligence agency.

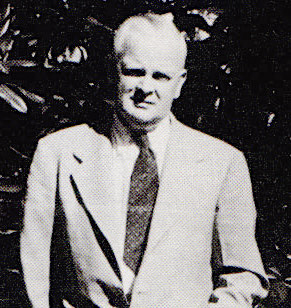
Dick Ellis, with whom Donovan met frequently

Donovan and Stephenson, according to Thomas, "eventually became so close that they were known as 'Big Bill' and 'Little Bill'." Donovan, Waller has said, "could not have formed the OSS without the British, who provided intelligence, trainers, organizational charts and advice – all with the idea of making OSS an adjunct to British intelligence. But Donovan wanted to mount his own operations."

According to Ellis, quoted in his biography by British-Australian author Jesse Fink: ‘I was soon requested to draft a blueprint for an American intelligence agency, the equivalent of BSC [British Security Co-ordination] and based on these British wartime improvisations... detailed tables of organisation were disclosed to Washington... among these were the organisational tables that led to the birth of General William Donovan’s OSS.’

Said United States Assistant Secretary of State Adolf Berle: ‘The really active head of the intelligence section in [William] Donovan’s [OSS] group is [Ellis] . . . in other words, [Stephenson’s] assistant in the British intelligence [sic] is running Donovan’s intelligence service.’"

=== OSS ===
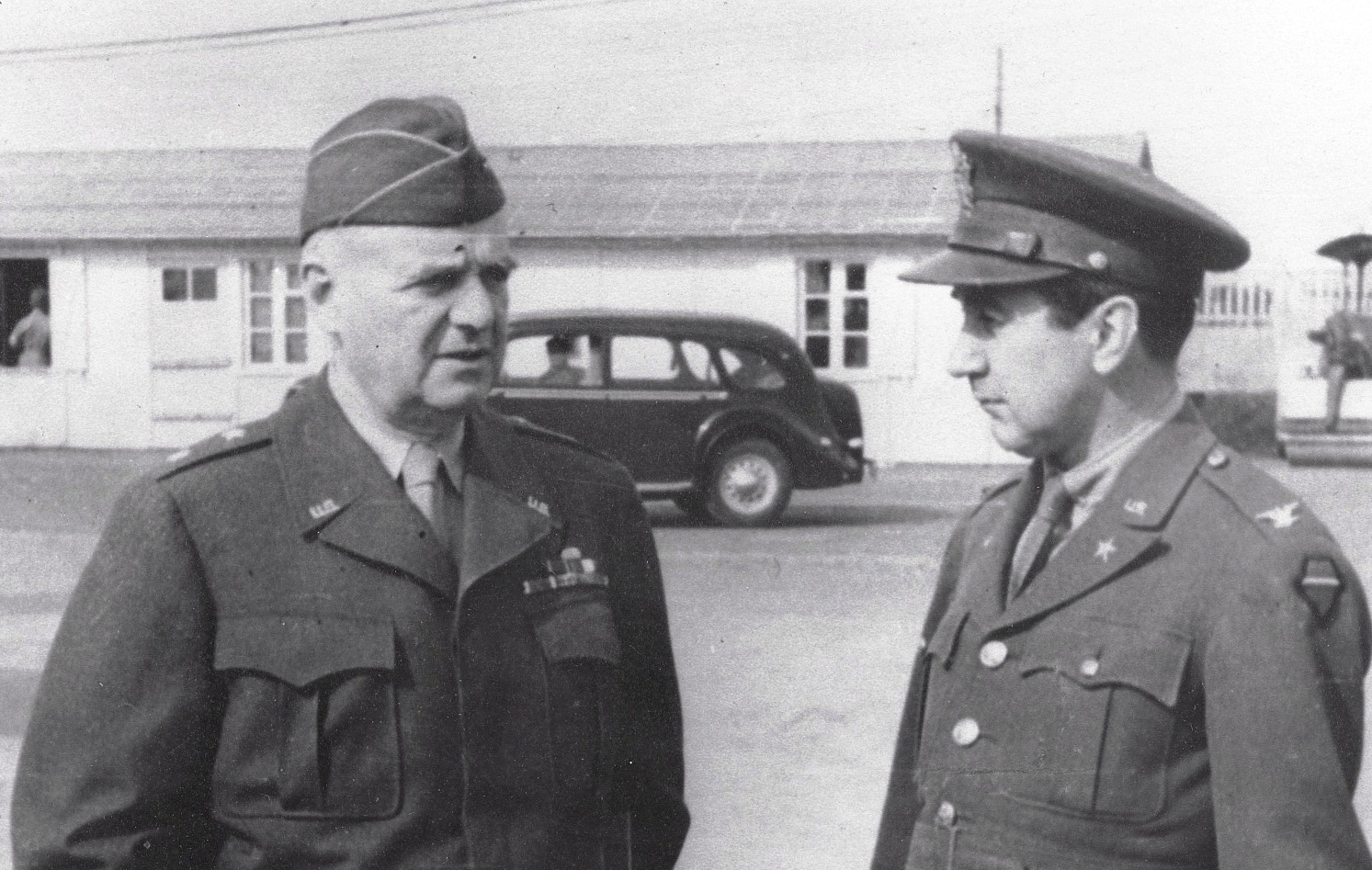
Donovan (left), Director of the OSS, and Colonel William H. Jackson in April 1945

On July 11, 1941, Roosevelt signed an order naming Donovan Coordinator of Information (COI). "At the time," Thomas wrote, "the U.S. government had no formal spy agency. In 1929, the Secretary of State, Henry L. Stimson, had abolished the highly effective Black Chamber, a code-breaking organization left over from World War I." In Stimson's view, "Gentlemen do not read each other's mail." The Army, Navy, FBI, State Department, and other entities all ran their own intelligence units, but they were feeble and isolated from one another. They also saw Donovan's new operation as a threat to their turfs.

Nevertheless, Donovan began to lay the groundwork for a centralized intelligence program. Working closely with Dick Ellis, it was he who organized the COI's New York headquarters in Room 3603 of Rockefeller Center in October 1941 and asked Allen Dulles to head it; the offices Dulles took were on the floor immediately above the location of the operations of Britain's MI6. Thomas has described the OSS as an "informal" and "freewheeling" place where "[r]ank meant little." David Bruce later recalled: "Woe to the officer who turned down a project because, on its face, it seemed ridiculous or at least unusual ... His [referring to the ideal officers in the OSS, contrasting with the aforementioned officers, who turned down such projects] imagination was unlimited. Ideas were his plaything. Excitement made him snort like a race horse." Throughout the war, the OSS would endure criticism by segments of the U.S. media and by many highly placed figures in the U.S. government and military. General George Marshall was an early critic but later changed his mind. Eisenhower was always supportive, as was General George Patton.

On December 7, after the Japanese attack on Pearl Harbor, Donovan met privately with Roosevelt and Edward R. Murrow, and FDR told Donovan, apropos of the COI, "It's a good thing you got me started on this." When Hitler gave a speech declaring war on the United States, he mentioned Donovan, whom he called "utterly unworthy". Donovan urged Roosevelt not to intern Japanese-Americans, warning that such an action would address a problem that did not exist, do harm to loyal Americans, and provide the Japanese with ammunition for their propaganda.

Donovan set up espionage and sabotage schools, established front companies, arranged clandestine collaborations with international corporations and the Vatican, and oversaw the invention of new, espionage-friendly guns, cameras, and bombs. Donovan also recruited agents, selecting individuals with a wide range of backgrounds – ranging from intellectuals and artists to people with criminal backgrounds. He hired a great many female spies, dismissing criticism by those who felt women were unsuited to such work. Among his prominent recruits were film director John Ford, actor Sterling Hayden, author Stephen Vincent Benét, and Eve Curie, daughter of the scientists Marie and Pierre Curie. Other OSS recruits included poet Archibald MacLeish, banker Paul Mellon, businessman Alfred V. du Pont (son of industrialist Alfred I. du Pont), chef Julia Child, psychologist Carl Jung (who helped with the effort to analyze the psyches of Hitler and other Nazi leaders), author Walter Lord, and members of the Auchincloss and Vanderbilt families. There were so many aristocrats in the agency that the joke went around that OSS stood for "Oh So Social".

In 1942, the COI ceased being a White House operation and was placed under the aegis of the Joint Chiefs of Staff. Roosevelt also changed its name to the Office of Strategic Services (OSS). Donovan was returned to active duty in the U.S. Army in his World War I rank of colonel. He was promoted to brigadier general in March 1943 and to major general in November 1944. Under his leadership the OSS would eventually conduct successful espionage and sabotage operations in Europe and parts of Asia, but continued to be kept out of South America owing to J. Edgar Hoover's hostility to Donovan, which also had a deleterious impact on efforts to share information between the two agencies. In addition, the OSS was blocked from the Philippines by the antipathy of General Douglas MacArthur, the commander of the Southwest Pacific Theater. OSS espionage and other on-site activities helped prepare the ground for the 1942 Allied invasion of North Africa, however, and Donovan himself took part in the Allied landing at Salerno, Italy, on September 3, 1943, and at the Anzio landing on January 22, 1944.

Donovan was in fact very active in virtually every theater of World War II. He spent a good deal of time in the Balkans, to which he had urged both Roosevelt and Churchill to pay more attention. He met in Europe with highly placed anti-Nazi Germans to broker an early peace that would allow for occupation by the Western Allies, establish a democratic Germany, and leave the Soviets out in the cold. In China, he struggled with Chiang Kai-shek and his underlings for permission to carry out espionage activities in their territory. He inspected OSS operations in Burma, met with Vyacheslav Molotov in Moscow to arrange for cooperation between the OSS and NKVD, and was present for MacArthur's successful April 1944 invasion of Hollandia on the northern coast of New Guinea. Overall, the OSS was most effective in the Balkans, China, Burma, and France.

By 1943, Donovan's relations with British officials were becoming increasingly strained as a result of turf wars, strategic and tactical disagreements, radical differences in style and temperament (the British accused the OSS of playing "cowboys and red Indians"), and contrasting visions of the postwar world. (The British wanted to retain their empire; Donovan saw the empire, at least in some instances, as an impediment to democracy and economic development.) MI6 chief Stewart Menzies was extremely hostile towards the idea of OSS operations anywhere in the British Empire, and categorically forbade the OSS to operate within the UK, or to deal with allied governments in exile which were based in London. Nonetheless, as of May 1944, Donovan had "some eleven thousand American officers and foreign agents scattered in every important capital." During the war he also received intelligence from a network of Catholic priests across Europe who engaged in espionage without the Pope's knowledge.

On D-Day, Donovan was on one of the ships that took part in the Normandy landings. Going ashore, he and his commander of covert operations in Europe, Colonel David K. E. Bruce, were shot at by a German plane, then moved on toward the American front lines and encountered German machine-gun fire. As they lay on the ground, Bruce later recalled, Donovan said, "David, we mustn't be captured. We know too much." Donovan said that he had two suicide pills, but then discovered he didn't. "I must shoot first," Donovan said. Bruce replied, "Yes, sir, but can we do much against machine guns with our pistols?" Donovan explained: "Oh, you don't understand. I mean, if we are about to be captured, I'll shoot you first. After all, I am your commanding officer."

Eventually, they found their way to General Omar Bradley's newly set-up tent headquarters on the beach. Upon returning to Washington, Donovan reported directly to Roosevelt on what he had observed. The success of the invasion, he said, showed that German naval and air forces were definitely no longer "Big League" and that "something has died in the German machine. Before the month was over, he was in Italy, implementing reforms in the OSS operation in that theater. He also met with Pope Pius XII, telling him about the activities of intelligence agents working out of the Japanese embassy at the Vatican. During the weeks leading up to the Valkyrie plot to kill Hitler, Dulles, Donovan's man in Switzerland, who was in contact with the plotters, kept him abreast of developments.

A particular triumph for the OSS was the role it played in conveying intelligence from southern France in the run-up to the Allied landing on the French Riviera on August 15, 1944. Thanks to Donovan's spies, said Colonel William Wilson Quinn, the invading army "knew everything about that beach and where every German was." Donovan was present for that invasion, too, after which he returned to Rome for a secret meeting with Hitler's envoy to the Vatican, Ernst von Weizsäcker. Shortly afterwards, he met with Marshal Tito to discuss OSS operations in Yugoslavia. Also in August 1944, Donovan came into conflict with Churchill over the OSS's support for Greek anti-royalists.

In the closing days of the war in Europe, Donovan spent much of his time in London, where he worked out of a command center that took up an entire floor of Claridge's Hotel. He fielded reports from across the continent, where the Wehrmacht was in such chaos that he "knew their positions on the battlefield better than German generals did." In one of many initiatives, he sent out "teams of French, Danish, Norwegian, and Polish nationals" to identify Gestapo officers who had tortured them and who now were trying to blend in with civilians in Allied-controlled areas of Germany. Acting on Donovan's orders, Dulles oversaw the surrender of the remaining Nazi forces in Italy several days in advance of the final German capitulation.

=== Postwar plans ===
As World War II began to wind to a close in early 1945, Donovan began to focus on preserving the OSS beyond the end of the war. A February 19 article in the Washington Times-Herald revealed his plans for a postwar intelligence agency and published a secret memo he had sent to Roosevelt proposing its creation. The article compared the proposed agency to the Gestapo. Knowing that Americans wanted a smaller federal government after the war, Roosevelt was not entirely sold on Donovan's proposal, although Donovan felt reasonably confident he could talk the president into the idea. Hoover disapproved of Donovan's plan, which he saw as a direct threat to FBI authority, even though Donovan had stressed that his agency would operate only abroad, not domestically. After Roosevelt's death in April, however, Donovan's political position was substantially weakened. Although he argued forcefully for the OSS's retention, he found himself opposed by the new president, Harry S. Truman. While the OSS got "glowing reviews" from many wartime commanders, notably Eisenhower, who described its contributions as "vital", critics dismissed it as "an arm of British intelligence" and, like the Times-Herald reporter, painted dark pictures of it as an American Gestapo in the making.

=== Nuremberg trials ===
While British authorities and the US military and State Department were relatively indifferent to the question of trying war criminals after the war, Donovan was lobbying Roosevelt as early as October 1943 to arrange for such prosecutions. Roosevelt tasked Donovan with looking into the legalities and technicalities, and in the months that followed Donovan collected testimonies about war criminals and related information from a wide range of sources. In addition to seeking justice, Donovan wanted to exact retribution for the torture and killing of OSS agents. When Truman named Supreme Court Justice Robert H. Jackson to serve as chief U.S. counsel in the prosecution of Nazi war criminals, Jackson, discovering that the OSS was the only agency that had seriously explored the issue, invited Donovan to join his trial staff.

On May 17, 1945, Donovan flew to Europe to prepare for the prosecutions, and eventually brought 172 OSS officers onto Jackson's team, interviewing Auschwitz survivors, tracking down SS and Gestapo documents, and uncovering other evidence. Donovan, whose idea it was to hold the trials in Nuremberg, also introduced Jackson to useful foreign officials and even released OSS funds to bankroll the prosecution effort. Eventually, Jackson, who had been a political rival of Donovan's in New York State, considered him a "godsend"; in return for Donovan's help, but also because the OSS had proven "vital for the prosecution team," Jackson lobbied Truman in person to approve of Donovan's plans for a permanent postwar intelligence agency. The effort was unsuccessful, however. On September 20, 1945, Truman signed an executive order abolishing the OSS.

As was only revealed 60 years later, Donovan succeeded in getting the Americans to block the Soviet attempt to add the Katyn massacre to the list of German war crimes. He had been convinced by the German opponent of Hitler, Fabian von Schlabrendorff, unofficially included on his staff, that it was not the Germans but the Soviet secret service, the NKVD, that had murdered some 4,000 Polish officers in the Katyn forest.

In Nuremberg, Donovan interrogated many prisoners, including Hermann Göring, whom he spoke with ten times but eventually Donovan fell out with Jackson. The latter wanted to indict the entire German High Command, not just men who had personally ordered or committed war crimes; Donovan considered this a violation of American principles of fairness. Donovan, a former prosecutor, also criticized Jackson's lack of skill and experience at putting together a strong case and at courtroom examination and cross-examination. Jackson removed him from the team, and Donovan returned to the U.S., where in January 1946 Truman presented him with the Distinguished Service Medal.

=== CIA ===
In 1946, Donovan resumed the practice of law and began writing a history of American intelligence since the Revolutionary War – a book he never completed. He traveled extensively in Europe and Asia and ran unsuccessfully for the Republican nomination for the US Senate.

He also became chairman of the newly founded American Committee on United Europe (ACUE), which worked to counter the new Communist threat to Europe by promoting European political unity. The vice-chairman was Dulles, and Walter Bedell Smith sat on the board as well. The ACUE financed the European Movement, the most important federalist organization in the immediate postwar years. (In 1958, the ACUE provided 53.5% of the movement's funds.) In addition, the ACUE provided all of the funding for the European Youth Campaign, in which Joseph Retinger, Robert Schuman, and Paul-Henri Spaak were involved.

Meanwhile, Truman moved forward with plans for a new intelligence agency, finally giving approval in 1946 for a watered-down interdepartmental "Central Intelligence Group." Donovan warned that it would be ineffectual – he compared it to a "debating society" – and he soon proved to be right. As the Cold War quickly intensified, Truman recognized the need for a far stronger intelligence service, and in February 1947 asked Congress to approve plans for a Central Intelligence Agency along the lines Donovan had proposed. Donovan himself lobbied Congress privately to pass the enabling legislation, the National Security Act of 1947. It was, in Waller's words, "a vindication of Donovan's vision". Among the OSS members who went on to become major CIA figures were Dulles, William Casey, William Colby, and James Jesus Angleton.

Donovan wanted to lead the CIA, and had many supporters who urged Truman to put him in charge. Instead, the president gave the job to Admiral Roscoe Hillenkoetter, whom Waller described as "lackluster". Meanwhile, Donovan accepted a Truman appointment to head a committee studying the country's fire departments. However, he worked behind the scenes to aid in the formation of the CIA, recommending that Hillenkoetter hire Dulles and other OSS veterans, suggesting various covert operations, and sharing contacts and information from behind the Iron Curtain. After returning from abroad, U.S. businessmen and ambassadors passed information to Donovan that he shared with the CIA. Instead of being grateful for Donovan's help, Truman was furious, considering him an intrusive meddler. In the 1952 presidential election, Donovan campaigned for Dwight D. Eisenhower, who had become a good friend since the war. After his victory, Donovan hoped to be named CIA head, but instead Eisenhower appointed Dulles, whose brother, John Foster Dulles, was the new Secretary of State. Eisenhower offered to make Donovan the Ambassador to France, but Donovan turned down the offer, not wanting to work closely with John Foster Dulles, for whom he had little respect. In August 1953, however, he did accept the post of Ambassador to Thailand, because the country was an important Cold War front and the position was one in which he felt he could operate with relative independence from Secretary Dulles.

Donovan took up that post on September 4. While in Thailand, he frequently traveled to Vietnam, which he thought could become a communist country, a possibility he felt the U.S. ambassador to that country, Donald Heath, lacked the energy and vision to prevent. One source says that he "was deeply involved in setting up C.I.A. operations in Vietnam and throughout Southeast Asia." Although his performance as ambassador received glowing reviews from the Thai government, he resigned from his position effective August 21, 1954.

After returning to the U.S., he resumed his law practice and registered as a lobbyist for the Thai government. Eisenhower made him chairman of the People to People Foundation, a group that arranged international citizen exchanges. Eisenhower believed that Americans acting through person-to-person communications in foreign countries would "make the truth of our peaceful goals and of our respect for the rights of others known to more people overseas." Donovan also worked with the International Rescue Committee, co-founded American Friends of Vietnam, and in 1956 raised a large sum of money for Hungarians who fled their country after the Soviet Ground Forces had crushed the Hungarian Uprising.

== Death and legacy ==
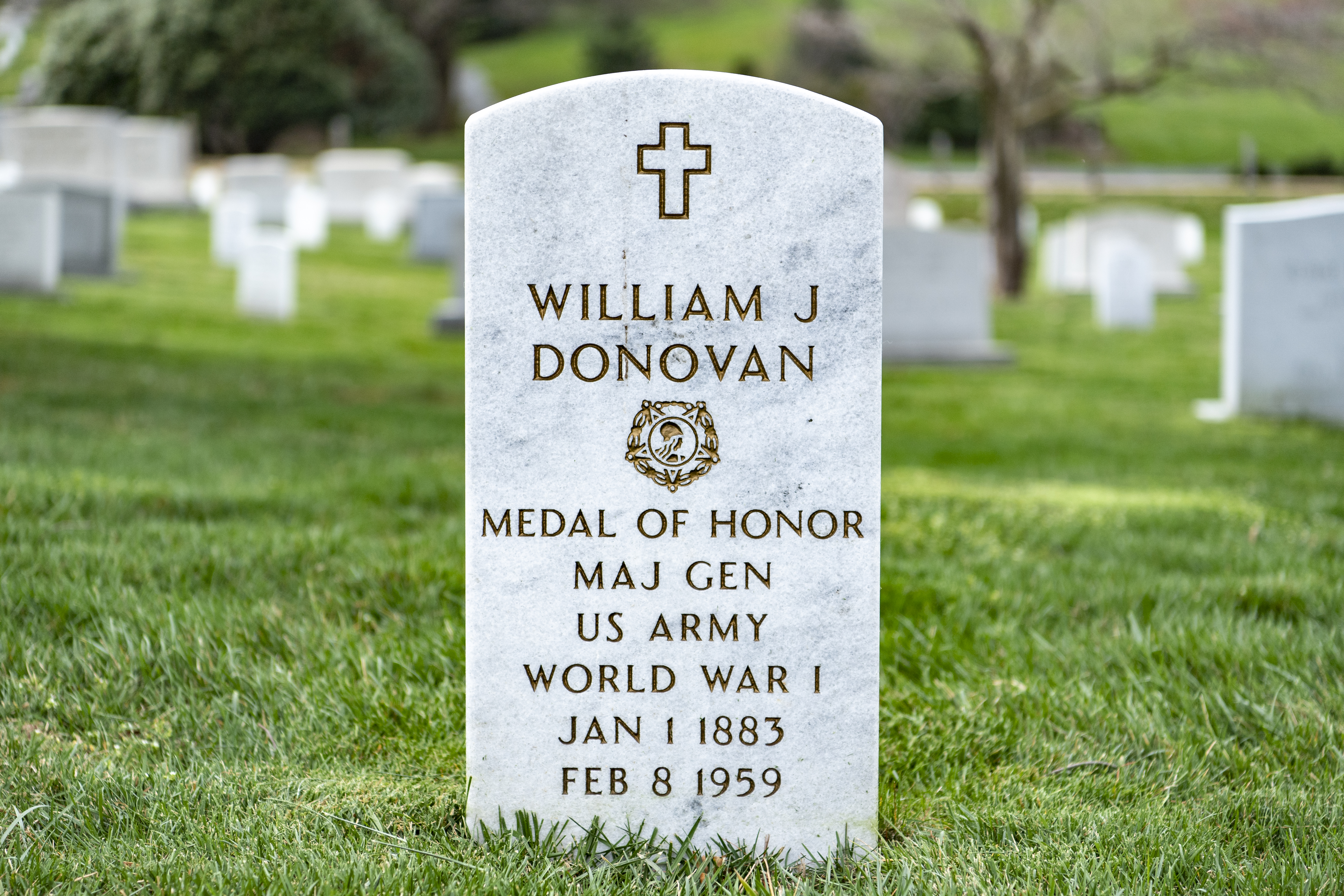
Grave of William J. Donovan at Arlington National Cemetery (March 2020)

Donovan had begun experiencing symptoms of dementia while in Thailand, and he was hospitalized in 1957. While in the hospital, he "imagined he saw the Red Army coming over the 59th Street bridge, into Manhattan, and in one memorable last mission, fled the hospital, wandering down the street in his pajamas." Shortly before his death, he was visited by Eisenhower, who later told a friend that Donovan was "the last hero."

Donovan died at the age of 76 from complications of vascular dementia on February 8, 1959, at Walter Reed Army Medical Center in Washington, D.C. Upon learning of his death, the CIA sent a cable to its station chiefs: "The man more responsible than any other for the existence of the Central Intelligence Agency has passed away." He is buried in Section 2 of Arlington National Cemetery. After his death, Donovan was awarded the Freedom Award of the International Rescue Committee. The law firm he founded, Donovan, Leisure, Newton & Irvine, was dissolved in 1998. His home in Chapel Hill near Berryville, Virginia, was listed on the National Register of Historic Places in 2004.

In 2011, it was suggested that a new federal courthouse in Buffalo be named after Donovan, but, instead, it was named after Robert H. Jackson, his rival prosecutor at Nuremberg. In 2014, U.S. Senator Charles Schumer asked the U.S. Department of Veterans Affairs (VA) to name an upstate New York cemetery after Donovan. In 2016, however, the VA decided against using Donovan's name. "It is outrageous that nothing has been done to honor Gen. Donovan, one of America's greatest patriots, in Buffalo or western New York," declared Charles Pinck, president of the OSS Society, who had thought the naming of the cemetery after Donovan was "a done deal."

Donovan is a member of the Military Intelligence Hall of Fame. He is also known as the "Father of American Intelligence" and the "Father of Central Intelligence." "The Central Intelligence Agency regards Donovan as its founding father," according to Thomas in a 2011 Vanity Fair profile. The George Bush Center for Intelligence, the CIA headquarters building in Langley, Virginia, has a statue of Donovan in the lobby. Thomas observed that Donovan's "exploits are utterly improbable but by now well documented in declassified wartime records that portray a brave, noble, headlong, gleeful, sometimes outrageous pursuit of action and skulduggery."

=== William J. Donovan Award ===
The William J. Donovan Award was created by the OSS Society, which was founded by Donovan in 1947. The award is presented by the OSS Society to "someone who has exemplified the distinguishing features that characterized General Donovan's lifetime of public service to the United of States of America as a citizen and a soldier." Notable recipients include Allen W. Dulles, President Dwight D. Eisenhower, Margaret Thatcher, President George H. W. Bush, and former Director of the Central Intelligence Agency Gina Haspel.

== Personal life ==
Donovan's son, David Rumsey Donovan, was a naval officer who served with distinction in World War II. His grandson, William James Donovan, served as an enlisted soldier in Vietnam and is also buried at Arlington National Cemetery.

== Awards and decorations ==
=== Authorized Decorations ===

1st row	Medal of Honor		Distinguished Service Cross
2nd row	Distinguished Service Medal with one oak leaf cluster	Silver Star	Purple Heart with two oak leaf clusters
3rd row	National Security Medal	Mexican Border Service Medal	World War I Victory Medal with five campaign stars
4th row	Army of Occupation of Germany Medal	American Defense Service Medal	American Campaign Medal
5th row	Asiatic-Pacific Campaign Medal with Arrowhead and two campaign stars	European–African–Middle Eastern Campaign Medal with Arrowhead device, and twelve campaign stars	World War II Victory Medal
6th row	Army of Occupation Medal with 'Germany' clasp	Armed Forces Reserve Medal with bronze hourglass device	Croix de guerre with Palm and Silver Star

=== Foreign Awards ===

1st row	Knight, Légion d'honneur	Commander, Légion d'honneur	Order of the British Empire
2nd row	Knight Grand Cross of the Order of St. Sylvester	Order of the Crown	Croce al Merito di Guerra
3rd row	Order of Polonia Restituta	Grand Officer of the Order of Léopold of Belgium with Palm	Czechoslovak War Cross 1939
4th row	Grand Officer of the Order of Orange Nassau	Grand Cross of the Royal Norwegian Order of St. Olav	Knight Grand Cross (First Class) of The Most Exalted Order of the White Elephant

== See also ==
- List of Medal of Honor recipients for World War I
- List of members of the American Legion
- List of U.S. political appointments that crossed party lines
- Special Activities Division
- Tightrope Walker (1979), sculpture on the Columbia University campus commemorating Donovan

== Notes ==
Party political offices
Preceded by Jeremiah Wood	Republican nominee for Lieutenant Governor of New York; 1922	Succeeded by Seymour Lowman
Preceded by Charles H. Tuttle	Republican nominee for Governor of New York; 1932	Succeeded by Robert Moses
Government offices
New office	Coordinator of Information; 1941–1942	Succeeded by Himself as Director of the Office of Strategic Services
Preceded by Himself as Coordinator of Information	Director of the Office of Strategic Services; 1942–1945	Succeeded by John Magruder as Director of the Strategic Services Unit
Diplomatic posts
Preceded by Edwin F. Stanton	United States Ambassador to Thailand; 1953–1954	Succeeded by John Peurifoy
