= PRS =

PRS or prs may refer to:

== Science and technology ==
- Peripheral Reflex System, an implementation of autonomous peripheral operations in microcontrollers
- Personal response system, in audience response
- Pervasive refusal syndrome, in medicine
- Phenotypic response surfaces, in medicine
- Pierre Robin syndrome, a congenital condition of facial abnormalities
- Polygenic risk score, in genetics
- Present tense, in linguistics
- Procedural reasoning system, for developing intelligent agents
- Products Requirement Specification, another term for the Product Requirements Document
- Public Radio Service, a license-free walkie-talkie personal radio service in China

== Places ==
- Prees railway station (National Rail station code), England
- Pacific Ridge School, California, US

== Organisations ==
- PRS for Music (formerly the Performing Right Society), UK copyright collective
- PRS Legislative Research, parliamentary service in New Delhi, India
- PRS Guitars, the guitar brand of luthier Paul Reed Smith
- Polish Register of Shipping, a classification society
- Pilots Right Stuff, former German paraglider manufacturer

=== Political ===
- Party for Social Renewal, Guinea-Bissau
- Radical Socialist Republican Party, Spain
- Republican-Socialist Party, France
- Parti Rakyat Sarawak, Malaysia

== Other uses ==
- Precision Rifle Series, shooting sport
- President of the Royal Society of London
- Poverty Reduction Strategy, required by the IMF and World Bank
- Dari (Persian dialect) of Afghanistan, ISO code
- Phocaean red slip, Late Roman and Early Byzantine pottery

== See also ==
- PR (disambiguation)
- PR5 (disambiguation)
- PRSS (disambiguation)
