= PR5 =

PR5 or variation may refer to:

== Places ==
- PR5 postcode, see PR postcode area
- Puerto Rico Highway 5 (PR-5)

== Vehicles ==
- USS Panay (PR-5), a river gunboat
- APJ PR5, a motorcycle from AJP Motos
- PR-5 Wiewior plus, a UAV drone
- Rafaelyants PR-5, Soviet biplane bomber

== Other uses ==
- PageRank
- Style Pr5 for runestones
- PR5, part of the Polish Radio External Service
- Phosphorane (PR_{5}), the chemical class

== See also ==
- PRS (disambiguation)
