= SKNL =

SKNL may refer to:

- S. Kumars Nationwide Limited, an Indian textile company
- Young Communist League of Finland (Finnish: Suomen kommunistinen nuorisoliitto)
- Studenckie Koło Naukowe Lotników, the developer of the Polish unmanned aerial vehicle PR-5 Wiewior plus
- SKNL (Stjepan Kožić – nezavisna lista), a political party in the 2025 Croatian local elections

== See also ==
- All pages with titles containing SKNL
