= Ekti Moroger Kahini =

Poem by Sukanta Bhattacharya

- by Sukanta Bhattacharya
- Original title: একটি মোরগের কাহিনী
- First published in: Chharpatra
- Country: India
- Language: Bengali
- Subject: Rooster
- Genre: Narrative poetry
- Publisher: Saraswat Library
- Publication date: June 1947
- Lines: 27
- Pages: 2
- ছাড়পত্র/একটি মোরগের কাহিনী at Bengali Wikisource

"Ekti Moroger Kahini" (The Tale of a Rooster) is a twenty-seven-line poem written by Sukanta Bhattacharya, published in June 1947 in the poetry anthology book Chharpatra. It is regarded as one of his most popular poems. In the poem, Bhattacharya describes a rooster and makes it the symbol of all poor people. The rooster dreams of entering the palace of a rich person. By the last lines of the poem, the rooster enters the palace but realizes it was going to be eaten instead of being fed.

== Reception ==
According to Priyanka Chowdhury of The Statesman, Bhattacharya in the poem described the story of a chicken who desired to eat good but ended up on the dining table of a rich person, itself becoming food. He frequently wrote about the middle class, the laborers, the soldiers, the enemies and the farmers, of which some are described in the poem "Ekti Moroger Kahini".

In the periodical Bhorer Kagoj, it is written that there are symbols in Bhattacharya's poems, of which were able to resonate voices and raise emotions in the minds of the readers through his poems. It is written that with the use of subtle metaphors and symbols, he highlighted class discrimination, relationship between the weak, poor and oppressed people and the exploiters, oppressors and powerful people. It is written that Bhattacharya's poems like "Sindi", "Cigarette", "Deshlai Kathi", "[Ekti] Moroger Kahini", he is a poet who protests against the widely prevalent social inequality.

Chiranjan Sarkar of The Daily Ittefaq said that he felt quite sad listening to the fate of the rooster in "Ekti Moroger Kahini" when he was a child. He writes that there was no room to think about anything except its right to life. He said that the rooster in the story is not only a rooster, but a symbol of many things, also serving as a representation of a small part of society. Regarding the poem, Sarkar writes that in the poor and dilapidated part of the world with the unfair social system, the right to life becomes the main thing. But in the case of developed and rich regions, it took a long to appreciate and recognize when the story of a rooster can surpass the right to life and become its symbol.

Journalist Syed Taufiq Zuhori wrote that in the poem, the autobiography of a rooster is described in a simple and allegorical style. He comments that the poem reveals the inhumane behavior of people, the cries of the starving and the pursuit of food to satisfy hunger. Zuhori remarked that the rich people have adequate money, dressing, and shelter, but the life of the poor, impoverished and starving people are like a symbolic rooster. He writes that in every line of the poem the sighs of the rooster and the needy people is prevalent. The rooster used to make a living off the leftovers of the affluential people, however, with the arrival of the ragged people, the right to that path is also broken. The rooster hopes to be free from its inhuman life, going towards the palace of the rich. The rooster becomes the food itself. Zuhori remarked that the death of the rooster signifies the fate of the people itself, and said that Sukanta Bhattacharya's "Ekti Moroger Kahini" expresses the lives of the poor, hungry and deprived people.

Jagannath Chakravorty in his biography book Sukanta Bhatacharya expressed that the poem was based on Bhattacharya's technique of symbolism, featuring a poem of quiet drama, surprise, and anti-climax. Journalist Aditi Samanta said that in "Ekti Moroger Kahini" ("Story of a Rooster"), Bhattacharya creates allegories to criticize structures of power and sacrifice. Samanta further writes that the story is, a rooster gets a place in a huge mansion amidst discarded packing boxes, and looks at the spread of food, but later it becomes part of the food to be eaten.

== Lines ==
Ekti Moroger Kahini

একটি মােরগ হঠাৎ আশ্রয় পেয়ে গেলাে
বিরাট প্রাসাদের ছােট্ট এক কোণে
ভাঙা প্যাকিং বাক্সের গাদায়-
আরাে দু’তিনটি মুরগীর সঙ্গে।

আশ্রয় যদিও মিললাে,
উপযুক্ত আহার মিললাে না।
সুতীক্ষ্ণ চিৎকারে প্রতিবাদ জানিয়ে
গলা ফাটালাে সেই মােরগ,
ভাের থেকে সন্ধ্যে পর্যন্ত—
তবুও সহানুভূতি জানালাে না সেই বিরাট শক্ত ইমারত।
তারপর শুরু হলাে তার আঁস্তাকুড়ে আনাগােনা:

আশ্চর্য। সেখানে প্রতিদিন মিলতে লাগলাে
ফেলে দেওয়া ভাত-রুটির চমৎকার প্রচুর খাবার।
তারপর এক সময় আঁস্তাকুড়েও এলাে অংশীদার
ময়লা ছেঁড়া ন্যাকড়া পরা দু'তিনটে মানুষ;
কাজেই দুর্বলতর মােরগের খাবার গেলো বন্ধ হয়ে।

খাবার! খাবার! খানিকটা খাবার।
অসহায় মােরগ খাবারের সন্ধানে
বারবার চেষ্টা করলাে প্রাসাদে ঢুকতে,
প্রত্যেকবারই তাড়া খেলে প্রচণ্ড।
ছােট্ট মােরগ ঘাড় উঁচু করে স্বপ্ন দেখে—
প্রাসাদের ভেতর রাশি রাশি খাবারের।
তারপর সত্যিই সে একদিন প্রাসাদে ঢুকতে পেলো,
একেবারে সােজা চ’লে এলাে
ধপধপে সাদা দামী কাপড়ে ঢাকা খাবার টেবিলে,
অবশ্য খাবার খেতে নয়—
খাবার হিসেবে।

Romanized

Ekti morog hothat ashroy peye gelo
Birat prasader choto ek kone
Bhanga packing baksher gadaay—
Aaro du'tinte murgir shonge।

Ashroy jodio millo,
Upojukto aahar millo na।
Shutikhno chitkare protibad janiye
Gola phatalo sei morog,
Bhor theke sondhe porjonto—
Tobuo sohanubhuti janalo na sei birat shokto imarat।
Tarpor shuru holo tar aastakure anagona:

Ashchorjo. Sekhane protidin milte laglo
Phele daoa bhaat-rutir chomotkar prochur khabar.
Tarpor ek somoy aastakureo elo ongshidar
Moyla chera nayykra pawra du'tinte manush;
Kajei durbolotor moroger khabar gelo bondho hoye।

Khabar! Khabar! Khanikta khabar।
Ashohay morog khabarer shondhane
Barbar cheshtha korlo prasade dhukte,
Prottekbarri tara khelo prochondo।
Choto morog ghar uchu kore swapna dakhe—
Prasader bhetor rashi rashi khabarer।
Tarpor sottiyi se ekdin prasade dhukte pelo,
Ekebare soja chole elo
Dhopdhope sada dami kapore dhaka khabar taybile,
Oboshho khabar khete noy—
Khabar hisebe।
