= Lenin (poem) =

1944 poem by Sukanta Bhattacharya

- "Revolution beats in my heart"
- by Sukanta Bhattacharya
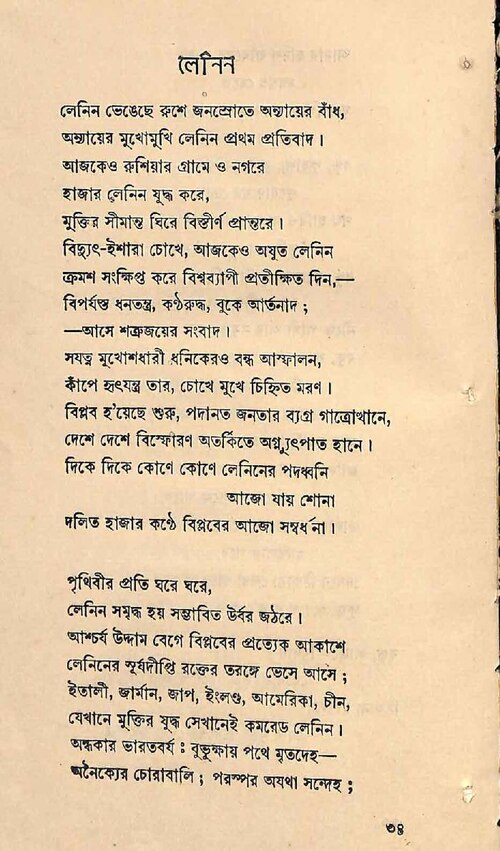
- A part of the poem in the book Chharpatra
- Original title: লেনিন
- Written: 1944
- Country: India
- Language: Bengali
- Series: Chharpatra
- Subject: Vladimir Lenin
- Genre: Narrative poetry
- Publisher: Saraswat Library
- Publication date: June 1947
- Lines: 34
- Pages: 2
- ছাড়পত্র/লেনিন at Bengali Wikisource

"Lenin" is a thirty-four-line poem by Sukanta Bhattacharya, originally written in 1944 and later published in the anthology book Chharpatra, printed in June 1947. It was published for a second time in Sukanta Samagra on August 15, 1957. The poem describes Bhattacharya's inspiration from Vladimir Lenin, and he imagines himself in the place of Lenin. He found himself inspired after hearing about the Russian Revolution led by Lenin, and wrote the poem wanting a revolution to end imperialism and British rule. He wrote this poem when he was suffering from an illness and was bedridden.

== Background, writing and reception ==
Sukanta Bhattacharya found himself upset seeing the pain and suffering of the oppressed people and countries in World War II. He wished for a society that would be free from exploitation, helpful to the lives of the working class and dreamt of a future world. From his youth, he became associated with Communism, particularly Marxism-Leninism. He became an official and recognized member of his local Communist Party of Beliaghata in 1944. His main inspirational individuals were Karl Marx and Vladimir Lenin. Bhattacharya heard of the then Russian Revolution conducted by Lenin, which inspired him to write the poem "Lenin". In the final line, he says "As if I am Lenin", imaging himself in the place of the poem's subject Lenin.

The Soviet Union started its journey being the first socialist country in the world, in the October Revolution, under the leadership of revolutionary Vladimir Lenin. According to Alaat Ehsan, Lenin and his revolution were successful in founding a society that was free from all sorts of exploitation and was in accordance with the country masses. Anti-imperialist organizations began to form in countries under the British rule. Class consciousness began to rise with the revolution. Communist parties in various countries in the world were able to emerge following the actions of Lenin. During this time, Indian people were fighting for independence against the British government that was prevalent on Indian territory. The Communist Party of India and its office in Beliaghata, where Bhattacharya used to work, emerged. Bhattacharya found himself to be deeply inspired by Lenin during his childhood and adolescence.

According to Anindita Chowdhury, the "Lenin" that Bhattacharya describes in the poem is basically Vladimir Lenin, a communist revolutionary and head of the Bolshevik Party. She remarks that Bhattacharya, sitting in Bengal, had come to the realization and recognition of a revolutionary in Russia. Lenin did not seem distant from Sukanta even though he had died two years before Sukanta was born. Sukanta Bhattacharya found in Lenin's revolution and in his political consciousness a connection. Chowdhury writes that in this context, the political party, state, along with time or geographical boundaries were irrelevant. Still, Bhattacharya found Lenin an important person. She writes that the specialty of a person increases with increase in their consciousness, ideology and party.

Before he wrote "Lenin", Bhattacharya described the bombing of Calcutta and the progress of the Japanese army into India in his poem "To Rabindranath" (Rabindranather Prati). He referenced British colonialism in the poem, which was still prevailing by the time he wrote "Lenin". In the poem about Rabindranath, he used the strategy of embodiment where historical material realities are shown to be taking place in his life cycles or in his body itself. He realizes that despair should not have been able to demotivate him, even when all of this was distressing to Bhattacharya. He realizes that for his plans to be successful, other poets too have to come down into the street and participate in the people's protests against mass colonialism and imperialism, and take direct actions themselves would giving rises to famines or deaths. This belief and ideology is reflected in the poem "Lenin", written in 1944. Anastasia Ulanowicz and Manisha Basu write in their book that, Bhattacharya could not remain passive and could not stay away from the political and social crisis. They write that if there is no real-life Lenin present, let him be reincarnated and form a leadership marked by bravery, optimism and political insight. During this time, Bhattacharya worked in relief camps to give out food provisions to people.

== Lines ==
Bengali

লেনিন ভেঙেছে রুশে জনস্রোতে অন্যায়ের বাঁধ,
অন্যায়ের মুখোমুখি লেনিন প্রথম প্রতিবাদ।
আজকেও রুশিয়ার গ্রামে ও নগরে
হাজার লেনিন যুদ্ধ করে,
মুক্তির সীমান্ত ঘিরে বিস্তীর্ণ প্রান্তরে।
বিদ্যুৎ-ইশারা চোখে, আজকেও অযুত লেনিন
ক্রমশ সংক্ষিপ্ত করে বিশ্বব্যাপী প্রতীক্ষিত দিন,
বিপর্যস্ত ধনতন্ত্র, কণ্ঠরুদ্ধ, বুকে আর্তনাদ;
– আসে শত্রুজয়ের সংবাদ।
সযত্ন মুখোশধরী ধনিকেরও বন্ধ আস্ফালন,
কাঁপে হৃৎযন্ত্র তার, চোখে মুখে চিহ্নিত মরণ।
বিপ্লব হয়েছে শুরু, পদানত জনতার ব্যগ্র গাত্রোত্থানে,
দেশে দেশে বিস্ফোরণ অতর্কিতে অগ্ন্যুৎপাত হানে।
দিকে দিকে কোণে কোণে লেনিনের পদধ্বনি
আজো যায় শোনা,
দলিত হাজার কণ্ঠে বিপ্লবের আজো সম্বর্ধনা।

পৃথিবীর প্রতি ঘরে ঘরে,
লেনিন সমৃদ্ধ হয় সম্ভাবিত উর্বর জঠরে।
আশ্চর্য উদ্দাম বেগে বিপ্লবের প্রত্যেক আকাশে
লেনিনের সূর্যদীপ্তি রক্তের তরঙ্গে ভেসে আসে;
ইতালী, জার্মান, জাপান, ইংলন্ড, আমেরিকা, চীন,
যেখানে মুক্তির যুদ্ধ সেখানেই কমরেড লেনিন।
অন্ধকার ভারতবর্ষ: বুভুক্ষায় পথে মৃতদেহ
অনৈক্যের চোরাবালি; পরস্পর অযথা সন্দেহ;
দরজায় চিহ্নিত নিত্য শত্রুর উদ্ধত পদাঘাত,
অদৃষ্ট র্ভৎসনা-ক্লান্ত কাটে দিন, বিমর্ষ রাত
বিদেশী শৃঙ্খলে পিষ্ট, শ্বাস তার ক্রমাগত ক্ষীণ-
এখানেও আয়োজন পূর্ণ করে নিঃশব্দে লেনিন।

লেনিন ভেঙেছে বিশ্বে জনস্রোতে অন্যায়ের বাঁধ,
অন্যায়ের মুখোমুখি লেনিন জানায় প্রতিবাদ।
মৃত্যুর সমুদ্র শেষ; পালে লাগে উদ্দাম বাতাস
মুক্তির শ্যামল তীর চোখে পড়ে, আন্দোলিত ঘাস।
লেনিন ভুমিষ্ঠ রক্তে, ক্লীবতার কাছে নেই ঋণ,
বিপ্লব স্পন্দিত বুকে, মনে হয় আমিই লেনিন।

Translation:
Romanized

Lenin bhengeche Rushe jonoshrote annayer badh,
Annayer mukhomukhi Lenin prothom protibad.
Aajkeo Russiar grame o nogore
Hajar Lenin juddho kore,
Muktir simanto ghire bistirno pranter.
Bidyut-ishara chokhe, aajkeo odut Lenin
Khromosho shonkhipto kore bishyobyapi protikkhito din,
Biporjosto dhontontro, konthoruddho, buke aartonad;
– Aase shotrujoyer shongbad.
Shojotno mukhoshdhori dhonikero bondho aashfalon,
Kaape hritjontro tar, chokhe mukhe chinhito moron.
Biplob hoyeche shuru, podanoto jonotar byagro gatrotthan,
Deshe deshe bishphoron attarkite ognutpat haane.
Dike dike kone kone Leniner pododhoni
Aajo jai shona,
Dalito hajar konthe biplober aajo shombordhona.

Prithibir proti ghore ghore,
Lenin shomriddho hoy shombhabito urbor jothore.
Aashchorjo uddam bege biplober prottek akashe
Leniner shurjodipti rokter toronge bheshe aashe;
Italy, German, Japan, Englond, America, Chin
Jekhane muktir juddho sekhanei comrade Lenin.
Andhakar Bharatborsho: Bubhukkhay pothe mritodeho
Anoikker chorabali; poroshpor ojotha shondeho;
Dorjay chinhito nitto shotrur uddhoto podaghat,
Adrishho bhorotshona-klanto kate din, bimorsho raat
Bideshi shringkhole pishto, shash tar kromagoto khin-
Ekhaneo aayojon purno kore nishhobde Lenin.

Lenin bhengeche bisshe jonoshrotte annayer badh,
Annayeri mukhomukhi Lenin janay protibad.
Mrityur shomudro shesh; paale lage uddam batash
Muktir shyamal tir chokhe pore, aandolito ghas.
Lenin bhumishto rokte, klibotar kache nei rin,
Biplob spondito buke, mone hoy ami e Lenin.
