= Lenin (disambiguation) =

Vladimir Lenin (1870–1924) was a Russian Bolshevik leader who was the founder and head of government of the Soviet Union.

Lenin may also refer to:

- Lenin (1916 icebreaker)
- Lenin (1957 icebreaker)
- Lenin (novel), by Alan Brien
- Çinarlı, Shamkir or Lenin, a village in Azerbaijan
- Lenin, Belarus, settlement
- Lenin (horse)
- Lenin (film), an Indian action romance

== People with the given name ==
- Kottawa Iniyage Saman Thusitha Lenin Kumara (born 1980), Sri Lankan Sinhala folk musician
- Lenin Arroyo (born 1979), Costa Rican American boxer
- Lenín Moreno (born 1953), 46th President of Ecuador
- Len Picota (born Lenin Picota in 1966), Panamanian baseball pitcher
- Lenin Rajendran (1951–2019), Indian film director
- Lenin Porozo (born 1990), Ecuadorian football player
- Lenin Preciado (born 1993), Ecuadorian judoka
- Lenin Raghuvanshi (born 1970), Indian Dalit rights activist
- Lenin Steenkamp (born 1969), South African football player
- Lenin Tamayo (born 2000), Peruvian singer-songwriter
- Gilbert Lenin Castillo (born 1988), Dominican boxer
- Quiarol Arzú or Quiarol Lenín Arzú Flores (born 1985), football player from Honduras
- B. Lenin (born 1947), Indian film editor, writer and director
- Cherukuri Lenin (1985/1986–2010), Indian archer
- Lalitha Lenin (born 1946), Indian poet
- Lenin Mancuso, Italian police officer and victim of the Sicilian Mafia (died 1979)

== See also ==
- Lehnin
- Leninsky (disambiguation) (Leninskaya, Leninskoye)
- Lenine (disambiguation)
- Lennon (disambiguation)
- List of places named after Vladimir Lenin
- Vladimir Ilyich Lenin (poem), a poem by Vladimir Mayakovsky
- Lenin (poem), a poem by Sukanta Bhattacharya
