= John Lennon (disambiguation) =

John Lennon (1940–1980) was an English singer-songwriter and founding member of the Beatles.

John Lennon may also refer to:

== People ==
- John Lennon (Royal Navy officer) (1768–1846), British naval captain
- John Brown Lennon (1850–1923), American labor union leader
- Dennis Lennon or John Dennis Lennon (1918–1991), British architect, interior designer, and furniture designer
- John Anthony Lennon (born 1950), American composer
- Julian Lennon (John Charles Julian Lennon) (born 1963), English singer, son of Beatles member John Lennon
- John George Lennon (1858–1919), American businessman and politician
- John J. Lennon, American incarcerated journalist
- J. Robert Lennon (John Robert Lennon, born 1970), American novelist, short story writer, musician and composer
- John Lennon (footballer) (born 1991), Brazilian footballer
- John Lennon (hurler), Irish hurler

== Music ==
- "John Lennon", a song by Arkells from Jackson Square
- "John Lennon", a song by Hamell on Trial from The Chord is Mightier Than the Sword

== Other uses ==
- John Lennon Park, a park in Havana, Cuba
- SS John B. Lennon, an American World War II Liberty ship
- Lennon Wall or John Lennon Wall, a wall in Prague, Czech Republic
- Liverpool John Lennon Airport

== See also ==
- John Lennon Hat, a popular name for a Mariner's cap
