= Jean Moreau =

French politician

Adrien Édouard Jean Moreau (31 July 1888 – 5 June 1972) was a French politician.

Moreau was born in Paris. He belonged first to the Republican Party of Liberty (1945–1946), then to the Independent Republicans (1946–1955) and then to the National Centre of Independents and Peasants (1956–1958). He figured prominently amongst the organisers of the European Youth Campaign. During 1953, he was France minister of Budget for a few months. He was mayor of Auxerre from 1941 to 1944 and from 1947 to 1971, and died there.
