= PRSS =

PRSS may refer to:

- Pasir Ris Secondary School, a school in Singapore
- Public Radio Satellite System, the satellite uplink facility used by public radio stations in the United States
- Pakistan Remote Sensing Satellite, the Chinese-built remote sensing satellite for Pakistan
- Power Rangers Super Samurai, 20th season of the Power Rangers television franchise
- CafePress, an online retailer of stock and user-customized on demand products.

== See also ==
- PRS (disambiguation)
