= CPOP =

CPOP, C-Pop, or C-pop may refer to:

== Music ==
- C-pop, Chinese pop music, popular music from China or Greater China, or, popular music in Chinese
- Cantopop (CPOP), Cantonese-language popular music
- City pop, s genre of Japanese music, a subgenre of J-pop, Japanese pop music
- Country pop (urban country), a genre that is a mix of "pop" music with "country and western" music
- Cowboy pop, "country and western" themed pop music

== Places ==
- Center for Problem-Oriented Policing, University of Albany, Albany, New York State, USA
- C-Pop (gallery), Detroit, Michigan, USA; an art gallery

== Groups, organizations ==
- Citizens to Preserve Overton Park, Memphis, Tennessee, USA; a 501(c)(4) nonprofit advocacy group
- Center for the Protection of Industrial Facilities (CPOP), a division of the Federal State Unitary Enterprise Guard (Russia), part of the National Guard of Russia
- Committee on Population (CPOP), a part of the National Academies of Sciences, Engineering, and Medicine, USA

== Other uses ==
- Hamming weight, also called Population Count (CPOP), in information theory, how different a string is from a zero-string
  - cpop (count population), an instruction in RISC-V computer machine code to calculate Hamming weight
- Controlled-Porosity Osmotic Pump, a type of osmotic-controlled release oral delivery system for pharmaceuticals

== See also ==
- WPOP, radio station POP in region W
- Q-Pop (disambiguation)
- KPOP (disambiguation), including radio station POP in region K
- Pop (disambiguation)
