= KPOP (disambiguation) =

K-pop is a form of popular music originating in South Korea.

K-pop or KPOP may also refer to:

== Music ==
- K-pop (band), a South Korean boy band
- K'Pop, a 2001 album by the eponymous band K-pop (band)
- KPOP (musical), a 2017 off-Broadway musical
- "K-pop" (Travis Scott, Bad Bunny and the Weeknd song), 2023
- "K Pop" (Playboi Carti song), 2025

== Callsigns ==
Radio station POP in region K

- KPOP (FM), a radio station (94.3 FM) licensed to serve Hartshorne, Oklahoma, United States
- KTNQ, a radio station (1020 AM) licensed to serve Los Angeles, California, United States, which held the call sign KPOP from 1955 to 1960

== Other uses ==
- Kerberized Post Office Protocol, a method to retrieve emails via an untrusted network such as the internet

== See also ==
- KPop Demon Hunters
- CPOP (disambiguation)
- Q-Pop (disambiguation)
- Q-pop (Qazaq pop), Kazakh pop music
- WPOP, radio station POP in region W
- Pop (disambiguation)
