= American Committee on United Europe =

Public/private US organization promoting European federalism

The American Committee on United Europe (ACUE), founded in 1948, was a publicly funded “private” American organization that sought to counter communism in Europe by promoting European federalism. Its first chairman was former head of the Office of Strategic Services (OSS) William Joseph Donovan, who had formally left the government after the war and was in private law practice. The vice-chairman was Allen Welsh Dulles, who also had left the government and was in private practice. He later joined the Central Intelligence Agency (CIA) in 1951. Other board members were Walter Bedell Smith, who would later become the CIA's first director and Tom Braden, who was recruited by the OSS when the US entered the war.

The structure of the organization was outlined in early summer of 1948 by Donovan and Dulles in response to assistance requests by Richard von Coudenhove-Kalergi, then Joseph Retinger and Winston Churchill, and resembled that of the Free Europe Committee.

Declassified American government documents have shown that the ACUE received foundation money it used to help fund of both the European Movement and the European Youth Campaign. The ACUE itself received funding from the Rockefeller and Ford foundations.

American policy was to slowly pursue a United States of Europe. The committee was later used as a discreet way to funnel CIA funds (by the mid-1950s, ACUE was receiving roughly US$1,000,000 per year) to organizations supporting European federalism such as the Council of Europe, the European Coal and Steel Community, and the proposed European Defence Community.

An article in The Daily Telegraph in September 2000 noted, "The State Department also played a role. A memo from the European section, dated June 11, 1965, advises the vice-president of the European Economic Community, Robert Marjolin, to pursue monetary union by stealth. It recommends suppressing debate until the point at which 'adoption of such proposals would become virtually inescapable'."

== See also ==
- History of the European Communities (1945-1957)
- United States of Europe
