= John J. Lennon =

American journalist

John J. Lennon (born April 26, 1977) is an American journalist and prison writer. Lennon has written for The Atlantic, The New York Times, and more, all while being incarcerated at Sing Sing for second-degree murder and selling drugs for 28 years to life. He published his first book, The Tragedy of True Crime, in 2025.

== Early life ==
Lennon was born in New York state to Sean Lennon and Laura Feaster. His father was an alcoholic who relapsed when he was born, leaving him in New York Foundling home for neglected and abused children until his mom was able to gain custody back. In 1985 his mother married George O’Connell, who Lennon said taught him about the Westies gang, romanticizing their actions. Lennon grew up in Sheepshead Bay, Brooklyn and attended Malcolm Gordon School for Boys.

At 15 Lennon was arrested for second-degree assault and sent to Spofford Juvenile Center. At 17, he was arrested for firearm possession and spent a year in Rikers Island.

== Killing and incarceration ==
Lennon was selling cocaine and had built up a network of sellers, when he heard that Alex Lawson had shaken down one of his dealers. He shot Lawson multiple times and dropped his body off a pier. Lennon's first trial resulted in a hung jury, in the second he was convicted of second-degree murder with a sentence of 28 years to life.

While in prison, in 2008, Lennon was stabbed by an acquaintance of Lawson's in revenge for the murder.

Lennon has submitted a clemency application to Governor Kathy Hochul and will be eligible for parole in 2029.

=== Journalism ===
After being transferred to Attica Correctional Facility, Lennon took a creative writing workshop taught by Doran Larson. Following the Sandy Hook Elementary School shooting, he sent an unsolicited article to The Atlantic about gun control, focusing on how he was able to obtain an unlicensed gun. It was published in August 2013 under the title "A Convicted Murderer's Case for Gun Control".

Lawson's sister asked Lennon to stop using her brother's name in his articles, accusing him of "victimiz[ing] my brother in perpetuity", which Lennon agreed to.

In September 2025, Lennon published his first book, The Tragedy of True Crime, which covers his own experience and profiles other prisoners.
