= Patrick Lennon =

Patrick or Pat Lennon may refer to:

- Patrick Lennon (baseball), baseball player
- Patrick Lennon (bishop) (1914–1990), Bishop of Kildare and Leighlin
- Pat Lennon, musician in Venice
- Pat Lennon (hurler) (born 1932), Irish hurler
