= European Youth Campaign =

Pro-Europe CIA front organization

The European Youth Campaign (EYC) was an organization funded by the CIA front organisation, the American Committee on United Europe (ACUE), and was created mainly as a response to the Comintern in Eastern Europe. The EYC is not connected to the Young European Movement, which is part of the European Movement.

The EYC was active in the 1950s, worked to promote a pro-European attitude amongst European youth and conducted "a massive propaganda campaign of conferences and exhibitions, cinema shows, radio broadcasts and a large array of publications". Jean Moreau and Fausta Deshormes were prominent organisers.

The EYC was the doctoral thesis of Christina Norwig, who reported, "More than 15 European countries were involved in the EYC, each in a different way and with changing intensity. Germany, France and Italy were without a doubt the more active countries, but also the Benelux countries played their part.... Many active personalities thought that the countries in Eastern Europe could still be converted to Democracy and that they belonged certainly to Europe. But the Cold War played in fact an important role in the European integration process, also on a local level.... The international Youth Festival held in East Berlin in 1951 troubled western European and American politicians. In answer to it the grounds for the EYC were laid in cooperation with the European Movement. The Campaign was financed by an American association, the American Committee on United Europe. All of its members were US-secret service agents. Without the US financial aid the Campaign would not have been able to survive."

The EYC was dissolved in 1958 because its sole funder, the ACUE, withdrew its funds.

== See also ==
- History of the European Communities (1945-1957)
