= Lennon (disambiguation) =

John Lennon (1940–1980) was an English rock musician who gained worldwide recognition as a member of the Beatles.

- Lennon (box set), a 1990 release compiled from his solo musical career
- Lennon (musical), a 2005 Broadway production based on his life and solo musical career

Lennon may also refer to:

- Lennon (name), a list of people with the given name or surname
- Lennon, Finistère, a commune in France
- Lennon, Michigan, a village in the United States
- 4147 Lennon, a main-belt asteroid
- River Lennon, a stream in County Donegal, Ireland
- Lennon (Brazilian footballer), born Lennon Eduardo Carvalho Celestino in 1991

== See also ==
- Lenin (disambiguation)
