= Thomas Lennon (disambiguation) =

Thomas Lennon (born 1970) is an American actor, comedian, and screenwriter.

Thomas Lennon may also refer to:

- Thomas Lennon (filmmaker) (born 1951), American documentary filmmaker
- Thomas Lennon (screenwriter, born 1896) (1896–1963), American screenwriter
- Thomas J. Lennon (1866–1926), California Supreme Court Justice
