= Lenn =

== Given name ==
- Eugene Lenn Nagbe
- Francis Lenn Taylor
- Lenn De Smet
- Lenn E. Goodman
- Lenn Hannon
- Lenn Jastremski
- Lenn Keller
- Lenn Kudrjawizki
- Lenn Redman
- Lenn Sakata

== Surname ==
- William Lenn

== See also ==
- Len (disambiguation)
