= Chharpatra =

Poetry book by Sukanta Bhattacharya

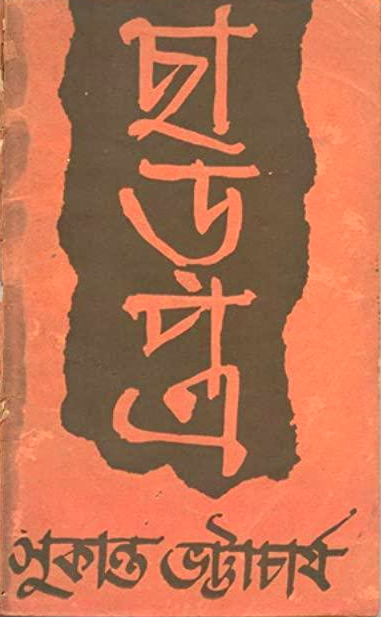
- Cover of the book Chharpatra, a collection of Bhattacharya's poetry, that was published posthumously.
- Author: Sukanta Bhattacharya
- Language: Bengali
- Genre: Poetry
- Publication date: 1947
- Publication place: India

Chharpatra (1947) is a Bengali book of poems written by Sukanta Bhattacharya. Sukanta wrote the poems of this book from 1943–1947. He died of tuberculosis at the age of 20. Following his death, Chharpatra, a collection of his poetry was published. Much of Bhattacharya poetry was heavily influenced by his experience living under the colonial rule of the British Empire.

== Literary features ==
Chharpatra created a sensation when it first appeared. Sukanta picked up particular types of labour class people as the subject of his poetry. Some of his poetries in the book Chharpatra presented some magnificent hitherto which was unknown to the Bengali poetry readers. The book starts with the poetry Chharpatra— the theme of the poetry was– "A new child is born; we will have to make room for him." "I shall make this world a fit place for him to live in."

One of his shorter poems name "Hey Mahajibon" (হে মহাজীবন) from the book Chharpatra compares the moon with a burnt roti, a prosaicness born of hunger:

প্রয়োজন নেই কবিতার স্নিগ্ধতা
কবিতা তোমায় দিলাম আজকে ছুটি
ক্ষুধার রাজ্যে পৃথিবী গদ্যময়
পূর্ণিমার চাঁদ যেন ঝলসানো রুটি

"Poetry, we do not need you any more.
A world devastated by hunger is too prosaic,
The full moon now reminds us of toasted bread"

== List of selected poetries ==
- Chharpatra
- Aagami
- Rabindranath-er Proti.
- Chara gachh.
- Khobor
- Europe-er Uddeshye,
- Prostut
- Prarthi.
- Ekti Moroger Kahini
- Sniri.
- Kalam.
- Agneyagiri.
- Runner.
- Chattagram: 1943
- Oitihasik.
- Shotru Ek
- Daak
- Bodhan.
- Mrityunjoyi Gaan
- Convoy
- Hey Mohajibon.
