= Michael Lennon =

Michael Lennon or Mike Lennon may refer to:

== Musicians ==
- Michael Lennon, a member of the American band Venice
- Mike Lennon, featured on a 2007 remix of a song by British DJ and producer Rusko

== Other people ==
- Michael Lennon, past chair of the Australian Civic Trust
- J. Michael Lennon, academic
- Mike Lennon (ice hockey), Canadian hockey player with the Dryden Dry Dogs in 2009–10 SIJHL season
