= Lenin Tamayo =

Peruvian singer-songwriter (born 2000)

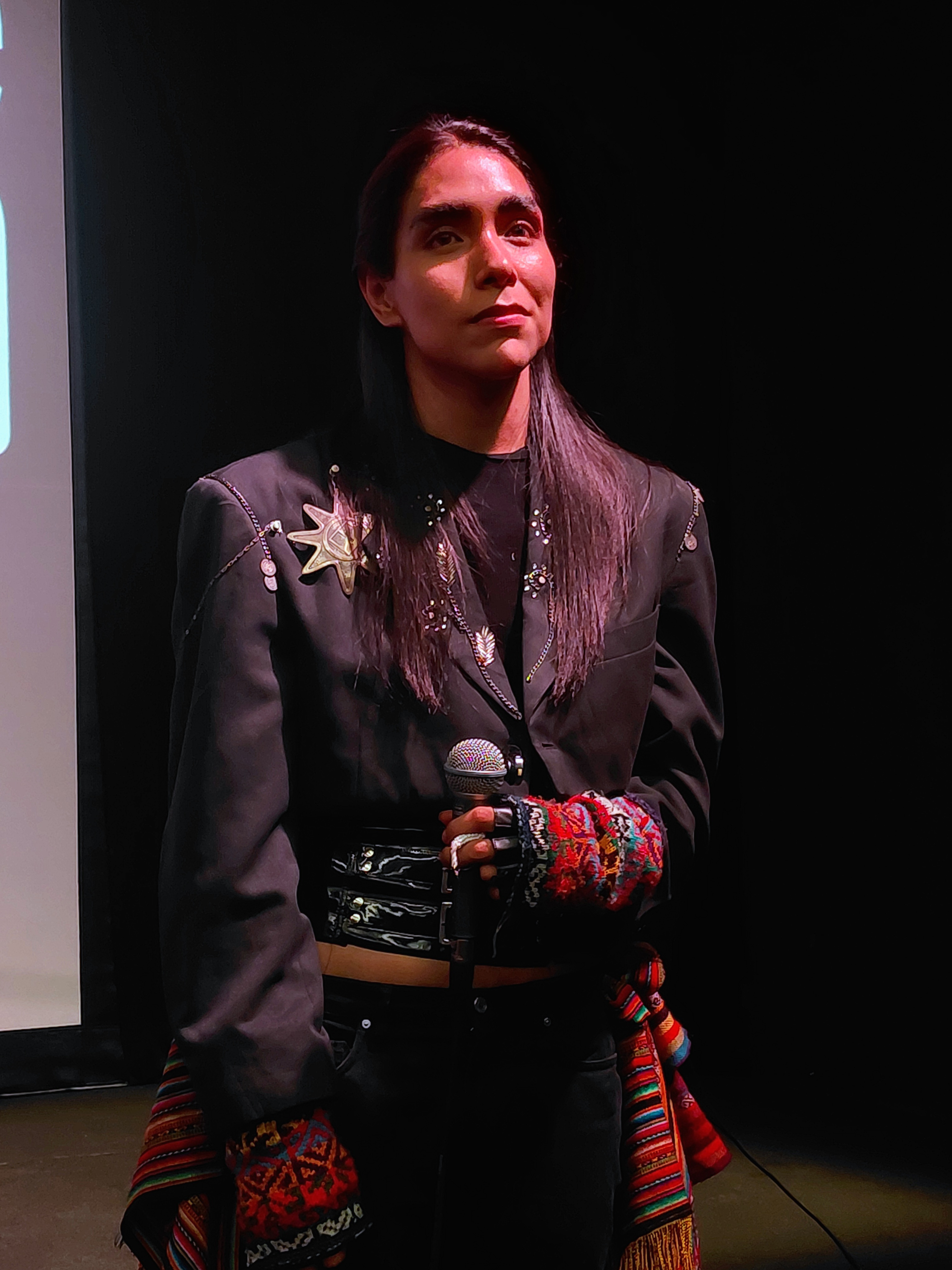
- Lenin Tamayo at the 30th Lima Film Festival.

Background information
- Born: Wilbert Lenin Tamayo Pinares; 2000 (age 25–26); Lima, Peru
- Education: National University of San Marcos
- Genres: K-pop; Andean music
- Occupation: Singer-songwriter
- Instrument: Vocals
- Years active: 2019–present
- Label: Hybe

Lenin Tamayo (born 2000) is a Peruvian singer-songwriter known for creating 'Q-pop', a genre of music that blends K-pop with traditional Andean music, featuring lyrics in the Quechua language.

== Early life ==
Tamayo was born in 2000 in Lima, Peru, the son of Yolanda Pinares, a Peruvian folk singer. Tamayo was often bullied as a teenager for his Indigenous looks, and discovered K-pop through a group of his classmates who helped him fight bullying.

Tamayo studied psychology at the National University of San Marcos in Lima, but chose to pursue a career in music after graduating.

== Career ==
In August of 2023, Tamayo released the first part of his debut album, Amaru I, which is grouped into three extended plays (EPs) containing four singles each. Each EP is set in places of Inca mythology: the Kay Pacha (the world of the living), Uku Pacha (the world of the dead) and Hanan Pacha (the heavenly kingdom). The title of the album refers to the amaru, a double headed serpent in Inca mythology. The album, which includes traditional Andean instrumentation such as the zampoña, charango, pututos, and chajchas, addresses issues such as indigenous identity and social protest in Peru. The video clips used for the album were filmed in Cusco.

In 2024, Tamayo went on a tour of Asia, performing shows in South Korea, India, Thailand, and Vietnam. In October of the same year, Tamayo was selected as a Time Magazine Next Generation Leader.

The second half of Tamayo's debut album, Amaru II, was released in June of 2025.

The same month, Tamayo was signed to the Hybe Corporation label. The following month, he was included in the 2025 Latin America Forbes 30 Under 30 regional list.

== Discography ==
=== Extended plays ===
- AMARU I (2023)
- AMARU II (2025)

=== Singles ===
- Cuando estoy aquí (Tusurikusun) (2022)
- Kutipuy (Versión Huayno LoFi) (2022)
- ¿Imaynata? (2022)
- Intiraymi (2022)
- FLOR DE COLORES, Pt. 1 (with Yolanda Pinares) (2023)
- Nuestro mensaje (2023)
- LA LLAQTA (2025)
