= Phenotypic response surfaces =

Phenotypic response surfaces (PRS) is an artificial intelligence-guided personalized medicine platform that relies on combinatorial optimization principles to quantify drug interactions and efficacies to develop optimized combination therapies to treat a broad spectrum of illnesses.

Phenotypic response surfaces fit a parabolic surface to a set of drug doses and biomarker values based on the understanding that the relationship between drugs, their interactions, and their effect on the measure biomarker can be modeled by quadric surfaces. The resulting surface allows for the omission of both in-vitro and in-silico screening of multi-drug combinations based on a patient's unique phenotypic response. This provides a method to utilize small data sets to create time-critical personalized therapies that is independent of the disease or drug mechanism. The adaptable nature of the platform allows it to tackle a wide range of applications from isolating novel combination therapies to predicting daily drug regimen adjustments to support in-patient treatments.

== History ==
Modern medical practice since its inception in the early 19th to 20th centuries has been seen as "a science of uncertainty and art of probability" as mused by one of its founders, Sir William Osler. The lack of a concrete mechanism for the relationship between drug dosing and its efficacy led largely to the use of population averages as a metric for determine optimal doses for patients. This issue is further compounded by the introduction of combination therapies as there is an exponential growth in number of possible combinations and outcomes as the number of drugs increases. Combinatory therapy treatments provide significant benefits over monotherapy alternatives including greater efficacies and lower side effects and fatality rates, making them ideal candidates to optimize. In 2011 the PRS methodology was developed by a team led by Dr. Ibrahim Al-Shyoukh and Dr. Chih Ming Ho of the University of California Los Angeles to provide a platform that would allow for a comparatively small number of calibration tests to optimize multi-drug combination therapies based on measurement of cellular biomarkers. Since its inception the PRS platform has been applied to a broad range of disease areas including organ transplants, oncology, and infectiology. The PRS platform has since become the basis for a commercial optimization platform marketed by Singapore based Kyan Therapeutics in partnership with Kite Pharma and the National University of Singapore to provided personalized combination therapies for oncological applications.

== Methodology ==
The PRS platform utilizes a neural network to fit data sets to a regression function resulting in a parabolic surface that provides a direct quantitative relationship between drug dose and efficacy. The governing function for the PRS platform is given as the following:

$E(C,t) = x_0 + \sum_{i=1}^Mx_iC_i +\sum_{i=1}^My_{ii}C_i^2 +\sum_{i=1}^{M-1}\sum_{j=i+1}^Mz_{ij}C_iC_j$

where:

- E is the combination efficacy as a function drug dose and time, given as a biomarker value
- C is the drug dose
- t is time
- x, y, z are PRS coefficients representing drug interaction
- M is the number of drugs

The parabolic nature of the relationship allows for the minimal required calibration test to utilize the PRS regression in the search area of N^{M} combinations, where N is the number of dosing regimens and M is the number of drugs in the combination.

== Applications ==
The mechanism-independent nature of the PRS platform makes it utilizable to treat a broad spectrum of diseases including for the treatment of cancers, infectious diseases, and for organ transplants.

=== Oncology ===
Optimization of combination therapies is of particular importance in oncology. Conventional cancer treatments often rely on the sequential use of chemotherapy drugs, with each new drug starting as soon as the previous agent loses efficacy. This methodology allows for cancerous cells, due to their rapid rate of mutation, to develop resistances to chemotherapy drugs in instances where chemotherapy drugs fail to be effective. Combination therapies are therefore vital to preventing the development of drug resistant tumors and thereby decreasing the likelihood of relapse among cancer patients. The PRS platform alleviates the principal difficulty in developing combination therapies to treat cancer as it omits the need to perform in-vitro high throughput screening to determine the most effective regimen that is currently employed. PRS based therapy has been used to successful derive an optimized 3 drug combination to treat multiple myeloma and overcome drug resistance. The PRS derivative CURATE.AI platform has also been used to optimize a 2 drug combination of a bromodomain inhibitor and enzalutamide to successfully treat and prevent the progression of prostate cancer.

=== Infectious disease ===
Drug resistance is a particular challenge when attempting to treat infectious diseases as monotherapy solutions carry the risk of increasing drug resistance and combination therapy demonstrates lower mortality rates. Highly contagious infectious diseases like tuberculosis have become the leading cause of death by infectious disease world wide. Tuberculosis treatment requires the sustained use of antibiotics over an extended period of time, with high rates of noncompliance among patients, which increases the risk of development of drug resistant forms of tuberculosis. The PRS platform has been successfully used to develop combinatory regimens that reduce tuberculosis treatment time by 75% and can be employed on both drug sensitive and resistant variants of the disease. The PRS derivative IDENTIF.AI platform has been used in Singapore to identify viable SARS-CoV-2 delta variant treatments on behalf of the Singapore Ministry of Health. The platform identified the metabolite EIDD-1931 as having strong antiviral properties that can be used in combination with other commercial antiviral agents to create an effective therapy for the treatment of the SARS-CoV-2 delta variant.

=== Organ transplant ===
The PRS derived phenotypic personalized dosing platform developed in 2016 has been used to provide personalized tacrolimus and prednisone dosing for liver transplant procedures and post transplant care to prevent transplant rejection events. This methodology is able to use the minimal number of calibration tests and as a result provides a physicians with a rolling window in which daily optimized drug dose can be predicted. The platform is recalibrated daily to take into consideration the patients changing physiological responses to the drug regimen providing physicians with accessible personalized treatment tools and eliminating the need to use of population average based dosing. The platform is actively being considered for other transplant uses including kidney and heart transplants.
