= PR-5 Wiewior plus =

PR-5 Wiewiór plus
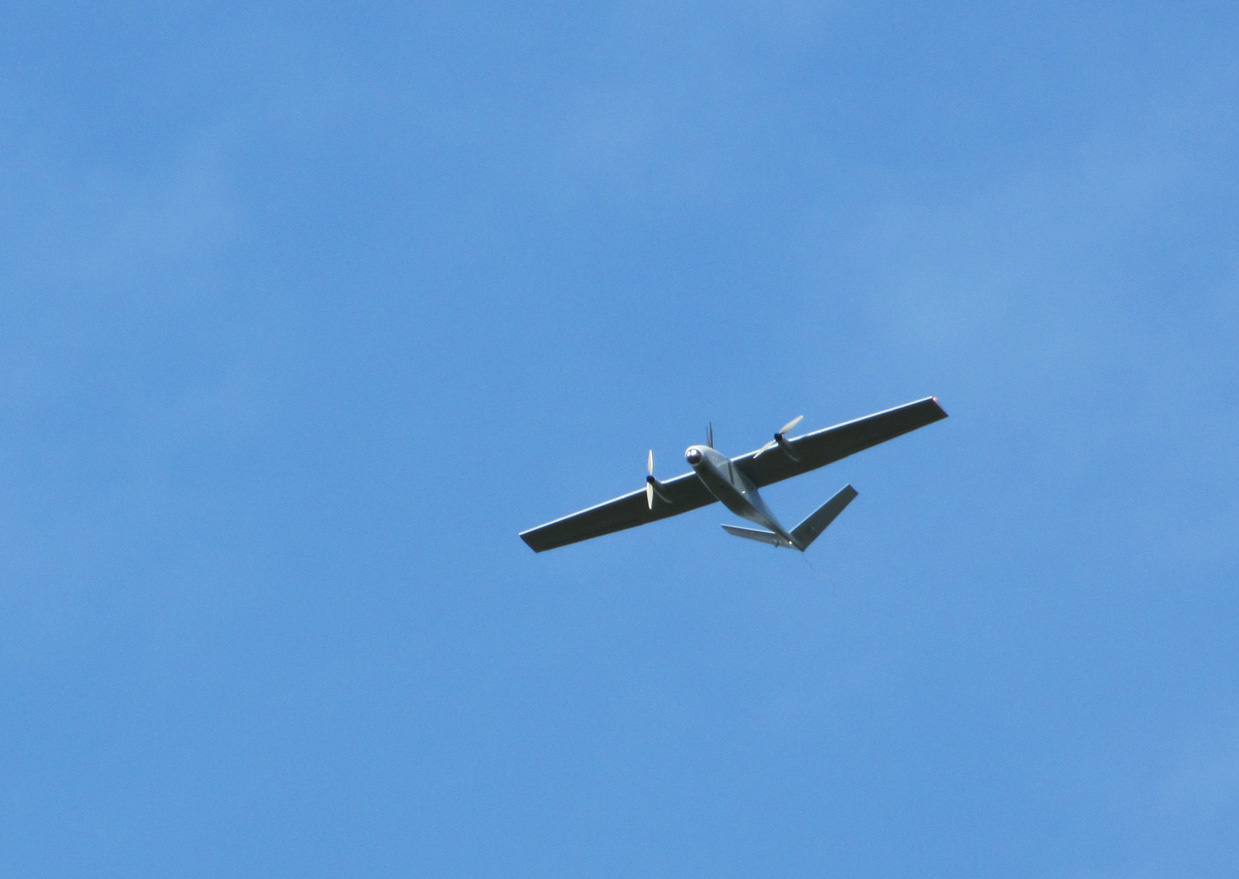

General information
- Type: Remotely controlled unmanned aerial vehicle
- Manufacturer: SKNL of the Rzeszów University of Technology (PRz)
- Status: Experimental/prototype
- Primary user: none
- Number built: 2

History
- Manufactured: 2010–Present
- First flight: September 2010
- Developed from: PR-5 Wiewiór

SKNL PRz PR-5 Wiewiór plus is a Polish unmanned aerial vehicle (UAV) being developed by students of Rzeszów University of Technology (Polish: Studenckie Koło Naukowe Lotników, Politechnika Rzeszowska, SKNL PRz), beginning in January 2006. Fifth of the series, following PR-1 Szpion, PR-2 Gacek, PR-3, PR-4 (SAE lifter) and PR-5 Wiewiór, it is an experimental reconnaissance aircraft. It has carbon fiber and kevlar monocoque structure with aluminium ferrules. Power plants are two electric brushless three-phase motors.

== Rescue System ==
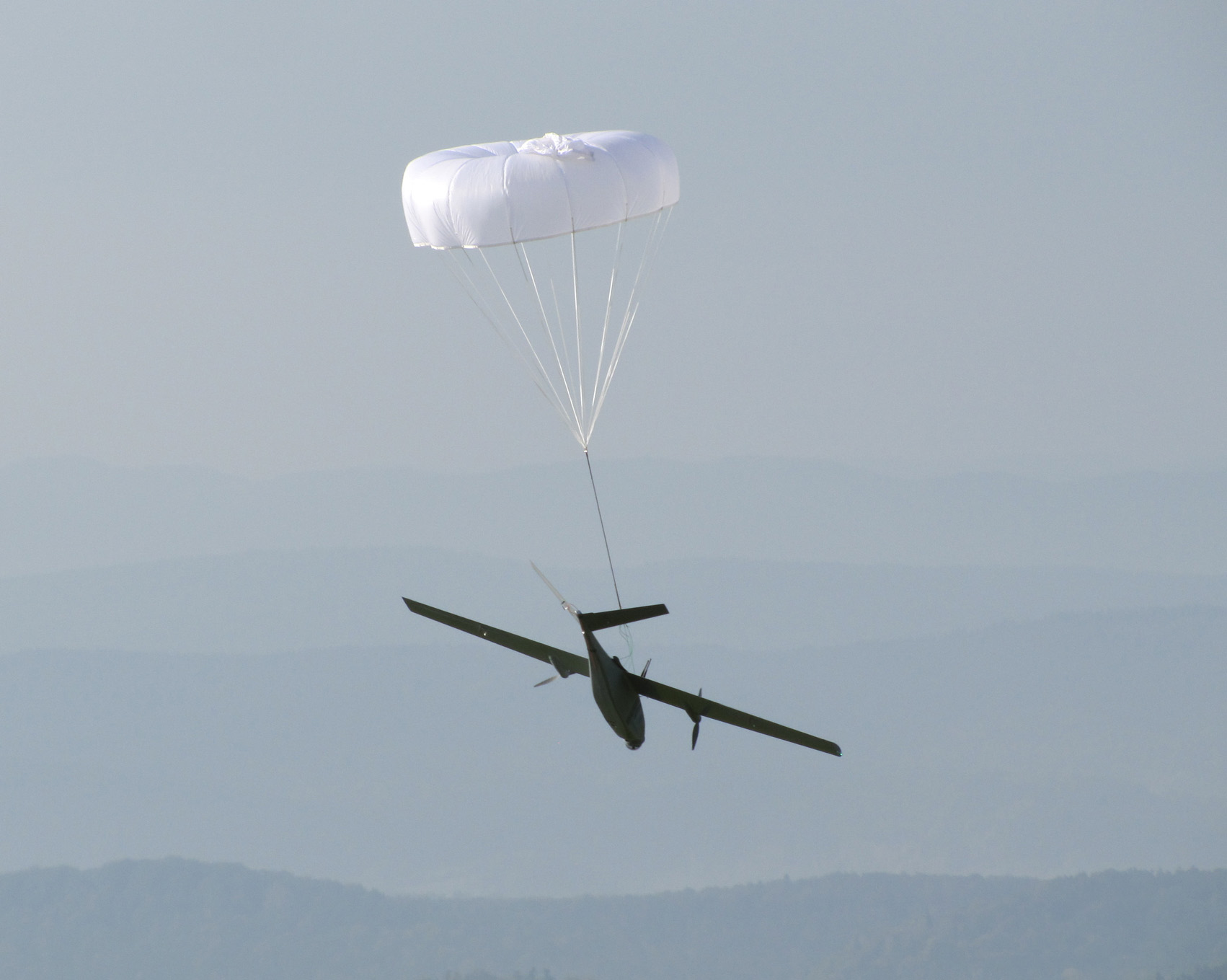
PR-5 Wiewiór plus parachute landing.

Different types of parachutes used in PR-5 Wiewiór plus allow to control descent velocity depending on airplane weight and expected windspeed. Two basic types: ring and cruciform parachutes in various sizes are available; all use pilot chute pull-out deployment.

== Specifications ==
=== General characteristics ===
- Length: 1.4 m
- Wingspan: 2.14 m
- Height: 0.3 m
- Wing area: 0.53 m^{2}
- Empty: 2.5 kg
- Maximum takeoff: 5.5 kg
- Powerplant: 2x AXI 2820/14
- Airfoil: CLARK Y15
- Endurance: ~50 min

== See also ==
- List of unmanned aerial vehicles
