= List of rampage killers in Europe =

This is a list of mass or spree killers in Europe. A mass murderer is typically defined as someone who kills three or more people in one incident, with no "cooling off" period, not including themselves. A mass murder typically occurs in a single location where one or more persons kill several others.

This list does not include serial killers or major figures in politics and government who orchestrated such actions.

== Rampage killers ==
Key to weapons

F – Firearms and other ranged weapons, especially rifles and handguns, but also bows and crossbows, grenade launchers, flamethrowers, or slingshots
M – Melee weapons, like knives, swords, spears, hammers, machetes, axes, clubs, rods, stones, or bare hands
O – Any other weapons, such as bombs, hand grenades, Molotov cocktails, poison and poisonous gas, as well as vehicle and arson attacks

A – indicates that an arson attack was the only other weapon used
V – indicates that a vehicle was the only other weapon used
E – indicates that explosives of any sort were the only other weapon used
P – indicates that an anaesthetising or deadly substance of any kind was the only other weapon used (includes poisonous gas)

Perpetrator	Date	Year	Location	Country	Killed	Injured	Weapon	Additional notes	Ref.
Lubitz, Andreas Günter, 27	24 March	2015	Prads-Haute-Bléone	France	149	0	V	Died in the crash	
Dzhebirkhanova, Satsita, 37; Nagayeva, Amanta, 30	24 Aug	2004	Buchalki village, Tula Oblast; Gluboky, Rostov Oblast	Russia	88	0	EV	Died in the crash	
Lahouaiej-Bouhlel, Mohamed, 31	July 14	2016	Promenade des Anglais, Nice, Provence-Alpes-Côte d'Azur	France	86	458	FV	Died in shootout with police	
Keith Jr., Alexander	11 December	1875	Bremerhaven, Bremen	Germany	81	200+	E	Shot himself twice in the head and succumbed five days later	
Rzayev, Chingis Yunusogly, 32	18 May	1973	Chita, Zabaykalsky Krai	Soviet Union	80	0	EV	Died in the crash	
Breivik, Anders Behring, 32	22 Jul	2011	Regjeringskvartalet, Oslo & Utøya Island, Hole Munincipality	Norway	77	323	EF	Currently serving 21 years of preventive detention	
Thompson, John, 42	16 Aug	1980	Central London	United Kingdom	37	23	A	Sentenced to life imprisonment	
Billon, Louis Michel Riuel, 39	13 Dec	1789	Senlis	Kingdom of France	26	41	FE	Lynched by mob	
Grigore, Eugen, 27	July	1974	Ciurea	(Socialist Republic of Romania) Romania	24	≈50	V	Released after 28 years confinement	
Guzy, Antoni	28 Aug	1939	Tarnów	(Second Polish Republic) Poland	20	35	E	Summarily executed during the Invasion of Poland	
Fieschi, Giuseppe Marco, 44	28 July	1835	Paris	Kingdom of France	18	22	F	Sentenced to death and executed	
Kozák, David, 24 (Note: At least one of the victims was a relative of the assailant.)	15/21 Dec	2023	Prague, Hostouň	Czechia	17	25	F	Committed suicide	
Ryan, Michael Robert, 27	19 Aug	1987	Hungerford, England	United Kingdom	16	15+	AF	Committed suicide Also killed a dog	
Karhu, Olavi, 19	1 July	1959	Köyliö	Finland	16	20	A	Committed suicide	
Kanavalau, Dzmitry, 25 (Канавалаў, Дзмітрый); Kavalyou, Uladzislau, 25 (Кавалёў, Уладзіслаў)	11 April	2011	Minsk	Belarus	15	204	E	Both were executed	
el Maleck, Abd (Note: Assailant was a member of the military, police, or a comparable force at the time of the rampage.)	10/11 June	1945	Dieppe	France	15	9	FM	Sentenced to death and executed	
Borel, Éric, 16	23/24 Sep	1995	Solliès-Pont & Cuers	France	15	4	FM	Committed suicide	
Unknown	2 May	1930	Shonguy	Soviet Union	15	0		All executed	
Labutkin, Alexander Alekseevich, 23 (Лабу́ткин, Алекса́ндр Алексе́евич)	30 Aug; 18 March	1933; 1935	Leningrad Oblast	Soviet Union	15	0	F	Sentenced to death and executed	
Leibacher, Friedrich Heinz, 57	27 Sep	2001	Zug	Switzerland	14	18	EF	Committed suicide	
Wagner, Ernst August, 38	4 Sep	1913	Degerloch & Mühlhausen	German Empire	14	11	FMA	Found not guilty by reason of insanity Also killed two animals	
Dornier, Christian, 31	12 July	1989	Luxiol	France	14	8	F	Found not guilty by reason of insanity	
Korshunov Victor Nikolaevich, 19 (Коршунов Виктор Николаевич), Surovtsev Yuri Stepanovich, 20 (Суровцев Юрий Степанович) (Note: Assailant was a corporal for the 5th North African Rifle Group)	26/27 Sep	1968	Kursk	Soviet Union	13	11	F	Korshunov killed by Surovtsev; Surovtsev sentenced to death and executed	
Martinović, Aco, 45 (Ацо Мартиновић)	1 Jan	2025	Cetinje	Montenegro	13	3	F	Committed suicide	
Bogdanovič, Ljubiša, 60 (Љубиша Богдановић)	9 April	2013	Velika Ivanča	Serbia	13	1	F	Committed suicide	
Magda, Marinko, 30	13 Jan; 20 Dec	1993; 1994	Subotica; Szeged	Serbia; Hungary	13	0	F	Sentenced to life in prison	
Bird, Derrick, 52	2 June	2010	Copeland, England	United Kingdom	12	11	F	Committed suicide	
Unknown	16 Sep	1992	The Hague	Netherlands	11	15	A		
Konopka, Zdeněk, 54	8 Aug	2020	Bohumín	Czech Republic	11	15	A	Sentenced to life in prison	
Grachov, Grigory Timofeevich, 47 (Грачёв, Григорий Тимофеевич)	26 July	1925	Ivankovo	Soviet Union	11	8	F A	Sentenced to 10 years in prison	
Rathjen, Tobias, 43	19 Feb	2020	Hanau	Germany	11	2	F	Committed suicide	
Boularés, Essia, 42	5 Feb	2019	Paris	France	10	36	A	Sentenced to 25 years imprisonment.	
Seifert, Willi Walter, 42	11 June	1964	Cologne	Germany	10	22	MA	Committed suicide	
Volynsky, Peter Kuzmich, 31	14 June	1971	Krasnodar	Soviet Union	10	20–90	E	Sent for compulsory psychiatric treatment	
Bagizhev, Viktor, 20 (Багижев, Виктор)	7 Aug	1976	Letipea	Soviet Union	10	13	FM	Committed suicide	
Borilović, Vučko, 33 (Вучко Бориловић)	12 Aug	2022	Cetinje	Montenegro	10	6	F	Killed by police and a civilian	
Andersson, Rickard, 35	4 Feb	2025	Örebro	Sweden	10	6	FA	Committed suicide	
Marimon Carles, Jose, 26	21 May	1928	Pobla de Ferran	Spain	10	2	FM	Killed	
Longo, Gaetano, 35	14 Sep	1900	Pastena	Italy	10	1	F	Committed suicide	
Sonboly, David, 18	22 July	2016	Munich	Germany	9	36	F	Committed suicide	
Galyaviev, Ilnaz Rinatovich, 19	11 May	2021	Kazan	Russia	9	21–32	EF	Sentenced to life imprisonment	
Oksiński, Michał, 24	7 Nov	2026	Ostrowiec Świętokrzyski & Kraków	Poland	9	15	F	Killed by police	
Izquierdo, Antonio, 53; Izquierdo, Emilio, 58	26 Aug	1990	Puerto Hurraco	Spain	9	12	F	Both sentenced to 684 years' imprisonment	
Blažić, Uroš, 21 (Урош Блажић)	4 May	2023	Dubona & Malo Orašje	Serbia	9	12	F	Sentenced to 20 years' imprisonment	
Hedin, Tore, 25	22 Aug	1952	Saxtorp & Hurva	Sweden	9	10–20	MA	Committed suicide Killed a man on 28 November 1951	
Palić, Vinko, 28	1 Jan	1993	Zrinski Topolovac	Croatia	9	7	F	Committed suicide	
Tranchita, Rosario	25 June	1925	Librizzi	(Kingdom of Italy) Italy	9	4	F	Killed	
Radosavljević, Nikola, 38 (Никола Радосављевић)	27 July	2007	Jabukovac	Serbia	9	4	FM	Found not guilty by reason of insanity	
Matić, Mile, 30 (Миле Матић)	26/27 Feb	1986	Doboj, Vranduk, Jeline, Žepče, Velika Rijeka	Yugoslavia	9	3	FMA	Found not guilty by reason of insanity Also killed a dog	
Shageyev, Almaz, 21 (Шагеев, Алмаз); Sukhorukov, Mikhail, 20 (Сухоруков, Михаил)	3–5 Feb	2002	Tatarstan	Russia	9	2	F	Shageyev killed by Sukhorukov; Sukhorukov committed suicide	
Shpagonov, Andrei, 22	26 April	1992	Kazan	Russia	9	1	FM	Sentenced to death and executed	
Zavistonovičius, Leonardas, 58–59	15 Feb	1998	Draučiai	Lithuania	9	1	F	Killed by angry mob Also killed a dog	
Vujić, Josip, 30 (Јосип Вујић)	March	1993	Pačir, Subotica, Aleksandrovo, Bajmok, Villány	FR Yugoslavia, Hungary	9	0	FM	Sentenced to 20 years in prison in Hungary; Sentenced in absentia to death in FR Yugoslavia; Sentenced to 40 years in prison in Serbia	
Durn, Richard, 33	27 March	2002	Nanterre	France	8	19	F	Committed suicide	
Auvinen, Pekka-Eric, 18	7 Nov	2007	Jokela	Finland	8	13	F	Committed suicide	
Hepnarová, Olga, 22	10 July	1973	Prague	Czechoslovakia	8	12	V	Sentenced to death and executed	
Donchev, Branimir Delchev, 17 (Дончев, Бранимир Делчев)	24 Dec	1974	Durvenitsa	Bulgaria	8	8	FM	Found not guilty by reason of insanity Terminated a pregnancy	
Kovář, Zdeněk, 62	24 Feb	2015	Uherský Brod	Czech Republic	8	1	F	Committed suicide	
Prihatchenko, Michel Stefanovich (Прихатченко, Михаил Стефанович)	23/24 Nov	1923	Novi Sad	(Kingdom of Yugoslavia) Yugoslavia	8	0	FM	Committed suicide	
Dolzhenko, Oleg, 19	7 April	2000	Zenzevatka, Volgograd Oblast	Russia	8	0	F	Sent for compulsory psychiatric treatment	
Veleslav; Unknown accomplice		1540	Hluboky	Holy Roman Empire	8	?	FM	The unnamed accomplice killed by Veleslav; Veleslav committed suicide	
Harman, Ľubomír, 48	30 Aug	2010	Devínska Nová Ves	Slovakia	7	15	F	Committed suicide	
Vasylchenkov, Dmytro, 57	18 April	2026	Kyiv	Ukraine	7	13	F	Killed by police	
Tates, Karst Roeland, 38	30 April	2009	Apeldoorn	Netherlands	7	10	V	Died in the crash	
Schwarz, Hermann, 24	30/31 Aug	1912	Romanshorn	Switzerland	7	6	F	Found not guilty by reason of insanity	
Fernández Vázquez, Paulino, 63	8 March	1989	Chantada	Spain	7	6	MA	Committed suicide	
Calvente Guerrero, Antonio	13 Sep	1902	Málaga	Spain	7	5	F	Killed by police	
van Wijnendaele, Michel, 28	12 May	1987	Bogaarden & Denderwindeke	Belgium	7	3	F	Committed suicide	
Vitásek, Ctirad, 42	10 Dec	2019	Ostrava	Czech Republic	7	2	F	Committed suicide	
Campo Solana, Ángel, 64	27 Nov	1980	Liermo	Spain	7	1	F	Committed suicide	
Simoes Jorge, Vítor Manuel, 38	1/2 March	1987	Osso da Baleia & Amieira	Portugal	7	1	FM	Sentenced to 20 years in prison	
Flink, Mattias, 24	11 June	1994	Falun	Sweden	7	1	F	Sentenced to life imprisonment	
Chubarov, Yuri, 47 (Чубаров, Юрий)	20 Sep	1997	Iecava	Latvia	7	1	F	Committed suicide	
Mataić, Antun, 50	14 April	1998	Podvinje	Croatia	7	1	F	Committed suicide	
Michot, Jean, 42	19 April	1875	Saint-Maurice-sur-Aveyron	France	7	0	M	Found not guilty by reason of insanity Also killed a cat	
Tymkow, Wasyl	11 Feb	1937	Krasne	Poland	7	0	F	Committed suicide	
Matvievsky, Theodor (Матвиевский, Теодор)	26 July	1959	Vaindloo	Soviet Union	7	0	F	Died	
Bolotin, Dmitriy, 25 (Болотин, Дмитрий); Nagibov, Yevgeniy (Нагибов, Евгений)	9/16 Aug	1998	Mytishchi	Russia	7	0	M	Bolotin sentenced to life imprisonment Nagibov died in pre-trial detention	
Tsuprik, Danil Nikolaevich, 19 (Цуприк, Данил Николаевич)	12 Aug	2021	Leninskoe & Sakhanka	Donetsk People's Republic	7	0	EF	Killed by police	
Zakharenko, Anatoliy, 58	22 May	2020	Novoselytsia	Ukraine	7	0	F	Found Not Guilty	
Gerdt, Petri, 19	11 Oct	2002	Vantaa	Finland	6	159	E	Died in the explosion	
Amrani, Nordine, 33	13 Dec	2011	Liège	Belgium	6	125	EF	Committed suicide	
Yli-Nurmikoski, Nestori, 30	22 Jan	1914	Ikaalinen	Russian Empire	6	20–30	P	Sentenced to 12 years in prison; released during the Russian Revolution and executed by the Red Guard during the Finnish Civil War	
Bekmansurov, Timur Maratovich, 18	20 Sep	2021	Perm	Russia	6	23	F	Sentenced to life imprisonment	
Weimann, Bernd Walter, 51	1 Dec	2020	Trier	Germany	6	23	V	Sentenced to life imprisonment One of the victims died in 2021; attributed to this event	
van der Vlis, Tristan, 24	9 April	2011	Alphen aan den Rijn	Netherlands	6	17	F	Committed suicide	
Antonín Blažek, 57	17 February	2013	Frenštát pod Radhoštěm	Czech Republic	6	10	E	Died in the explosion	
Mikolajczyk, Erwin, 39	9 March	1994	Euskirchen	Germany	6	8	EF	Committed suicide	
Fusz, Philipp, 35	9 March	2023	Hamburg	Germany	6	8	F	Committed suicide Terminated a pregnancy	
Criscione, Erminio, 36	4 March	1992	Rivera, Massagno & Origlio	Switzerland	6	6	F	Committed suicide while awaiting trial	
Pahoki, Krešimir, 51	22 July	2024	Daruvar	Croatia	6	6	F	Sentenced to 50 years in prison	
Pica, Jean, 55	9–21 Nov	1972	Beaurecueil	France	6	5	EF	Committed suicide	
Yilmaz, Çevdet, 27	5 April	1983	Delft	Netherlands	6	4	F	Sentenced to life imprisonment	
Fedorenko, Anatoly	19 May	1977	Leningrad	Soviet Union	6	2	F	Executed	
Lepnev, Sergei, 18	9 March	1997	Kamyshin, Volgograd Oblast	Russia	6	2	F	Sentenced to death, commuted to 25 years in prison	
Bizónis, Pantelís, 50 (Παντελής Μπιζώνης)	15 March	1985	Vigla	Greece	6	1	F	Sentenced to life imprisonment	
Vinogradov, Dmitry Andreyevich, 29	7 Nov	2012	Moscow	Russia	6	1	F	Sentenced to life imprisonment	
Galkin, Ilya Ilyich, 24 (Галкин, Илья Ильич)	12–17 April	2007	Sochi	Russia	6	1	FM	Sentenced to life imprisonment for Sochi bombings	
Pomazun, Sergey Aleksandrovic, 31 (Помазун, Сергей Александрович)	22/23 April	2013	Belgorod	Russia	6	1	FM	Sentenced to life imprisonment	
Gazioğlu, Fatih Khan, 45	June 29	2026	Stade	Germany	6	0	F	Committed suicide in prison	
van Laethem, Camille-Joseph, 52	5 Nov	1953	Thy-le-Chateau	Belgium	6	0	FM	Committed suicide	
Werlé, Michel, 41	23 July	1981	Pont-de-Roide	France	6	0	F	Committed suicide	
Medina Gordillo, Juan, 53	27 Nov	1996	Gamonal & San Millán de Lara	Spain	6	0	F	Committed suicide	
Gautsch, Johann, 36	21 Nov	1997	Mauterndorf	Austria	6	0	F	Committed suicide	
Zmijek, Józef		1936		Poland	6	?	F	Sentenced to death	
Unknown	21 Jan	1923	Ravenna	(Kingdom of Italy) Italy	5–6	?	M	Killed	
Charva, Karel, 34	3 June	1983	Eppstein	West Germany	5	14	F	Committed suicide	
Kiss-Kovacs, Stefan	12 Aug	1906	Ludaspuszta	Austria-Hungary	5+	13	F	Killed by police	
Zlatić, Siniša, 38 (Златић, Синиша)	2 July	2016	Žitište	Serbia	5	22	F	Sentenced to 40 years in prison	
Akilov, Rahmat, 39 (Акилов, Рахмат)	7 April	2017	Stockholm	Sweden	5	15	V	Sentenced to life imprisonment. Also killed a dog	
Unknown	Nov	1841	Vetralla	Papal States	5	12	M	Killed	
Ewen, Günter Hermann, 36–37	16 May	1999	Dillingen; Sierck-les-Bains	Germany; France	5	11	F	Committed suicide	
Semidovskiy, Sergey, 40 (Семидовский, Сергей)	25 Aug	2002	Yaroslavsky	Russia	5	10	F	Committed suicide	
Nordlund, John Filip, 25	17 May	1900	Ferry "Prins Carl"	Sweden	5	8	FM	Sentenced to death and executed	
Pestallazzi, Battista, 30	6 Feb	1922	Lumino	Switzerland	5	8	F	Committed suicide	
Zenkov, Igor Yourievitch, 50 (Зенков, Игорь Юрьевич)	10–11 June	2017	Kratovo	Russia	5	6	EF	Committed suicide	
Mustafa	30 Jan	1895	Constantinople	Ottoman Empire	5	14	M	Sentenced to death, later changed to 15 years in prison	
Allafort, Serge, 32	Oct 4	1972	Angoulême	France	5	5	F	Found not guilty by reason of insanity	
Murolo, Giulio, 48	15 May	2015	Secondigliano	Italy	5	5	F	Committed suicide in prison	
Atuashvili, Nodar, 49 (ნოდარ ათუაშვილი)	20 Jan	2023	Sagarejo, Kakheti	Georgia	5	5	F	Committed suicide	
Bråthen, Espen Andersen, 37	13 Oct	2021	Kongsberg	Norway	5	3	FM	Found not guilty by reason of insanity	
Davison, Jake William, 22	12 Aug	2021	Plymouth	United Kingdom	5	2	F	Committed suicide	
Ivan Korade, 44	27 March	2008	Velika Veternička	Croatia	5	1	F M	Committed suicide during the manhunt	
Shkupolli, Ibrahim, 43	31 Dec	2009	Espoo	Finland	5	0	F	Committed suicide	
Onoprienko, Anatoly, 30	16 Aug	1989	Novohorivka, Zaporizhzhia Oblast	Soviet Union	5	0	F	Serial killer. Arrested and sentenced to death, commuted to life imprisonment	
Demiri, Alil, 27; Ismailovic, Afrim, 32	12 April	2012	Butel Municipality, Greater Skopje	North Macedonia	5	0	F	Both sentenced to life in prison	
Aseev, Ilya, 27	8 May	2016	Cholokhovo, Moscow Oblast	Russia	5	0	F	Arrested, sentenced to life imprisonment and committed suicide later	
Theofilos Sechidis, 24 (Note: All the victims were killed in the same household.) (Note: All the victims were members of the same family.)	19 & 20 May	1996	Thassos	Greece	5	0	FM	He was sentenced to five life sentences. In prison he was diagnosed with schizophrenia	
Rüther, Jens Alexander, 48	7 April	2018	Münster	Germany	4	20+	V	Committed suicide	
Zethraeus, Tommy, 25	4 Dec	1994	Stockholm	Sweden	4	20	F	Sentenced to life imprisonment	
Zhidkov, Aleksandr, 29 (Жидков, Александр); Veretel'nik, Michael, 18 (Веретельник, Михаил)	13 Dec	1975	Permsky District	Soviet Union	4	14	FM	Both sentenced to death and executed Terminated a pregnancy	
de Gelder, Kim, 20	16 Jan and 23 Jan	2009	Sint-Gillis-bij-Dendermonde	Belgium	4	12	M	Arrested and sentenced to life imprisonment	
Allemand, Jean Baptiste, 27	14 July	1900	Goult	France	4	8	M	Committed suicide	
Peyerl, Martin, 16	1 Nov	1999	Bad Reichenhall	Germany	4	7	F	Committed suicide Also killed a cat	
Roux-Durraffourt, Jean-Pierre, 44	29 Oct	2001	Tours	France	4	7	F	Sentenced to life imprisonment	
Molinari, Giuseppe, 25	3 July	1956	Busto Arsizio	Italy	4	6	F	Committed suicide	
Unknown	24 May	1997	Balagansk	Russia	4	6	F	Committed suicide	
Gonzalez, Daniel, 24	15–17 September	2004	London/Sussex	United Kingdom	4	2	M	Sentenced to life imprisonment. Committed suicide while incarcerated	
Monakhov, Daniil, 18	12 Oct	2020	Bolsheorlovskoye, Nizhny Novgorod oblast	Russia	4	2	F	Committed suicide	
Koryakov, Alexander, 19	22 Feb	1999	Gulbene	Latvia	4	1	M	Sentenced to life imprisonment	
Akhtyamov, Ruslan, 26	26 April	2022	Veshkayma, Ulyanovsk Oblast	Russia	4	1	F	Committed suicide	
Rizvanović, Alen Rizvan, 26	20 June	2015	Graz	Austria	4	36	MV	Sentenced to life imprisonment	
Esbensen, Noah, 22	3 July	2022	Copenhagen	Denmark	3	27	FM	Found not guilty by reason of insanity	
Radmacher, Sabine, 41	19 Sep	2010	Lörrach	Germany	3	18	FMA	Killed by police	
Savrasov, Nikolay Nikolayevich, 34 (Саврасов, Николай Николаевич)	30 Aug – 1 Sep	1973	Gorlovka & Moscow	Soviet Union	3	16	ME	Died in the explosion	
Safronov, Aleksei, 22 (Сафронов, Алексей)	31 Jan – 1 Feb	1996	Tapa & Jõhvi	Estonia	3	14	ME	Died in the explosion	
Rudakubana, Axel Muganwa, 17	29 Jul	2024	Southport	United Kingdom	3	10	M	Sentenced to life imprisonment	
Sacco, Angelo Secondo, 54	28 June	2005	Bogogno	Italy	3	9	F	Sentenced to life imprisonment	
Arbuzov, Aleksei Vladimirovich, 26–27 (Арбузов, Алексей Владимирович)	9 Dec	2011	Moscow	Russia	3	9	M	Sent to compulsory psychiatric treatment	
de Mingo Nieto, Noelia, 21	2 Apr	2003	Madrid	Spain	3	4	M	Found not guilty by reason of insanity. Also injured two people by stabbing in 2021.	
Sazonov, Sergei, 26	22 Oct	2019	Village Dudkino, New Moscow, Moscow	Russia	3 (inc. unborn child)	4	M	Apprehended, subsequent fate unknown	
M., Arnaud, 31	19 Sep	2017	Paris	France	3	3	F	Committed suicide, also killed a pet dog	
Dennehy, Joanna, 29	10–19 March	2013	Cambridgeshire	United Kingdom	3	2	M	Sentenced to a whole life tariff	
Barakhov, Sergei, 41	23 Aug	2017	Nizhny Novgorod	Russia	3	2	ME	Wounded by police, detained and sent for compulsory psychiatric treatment in 2018	
S., John, 38	4 May and 6 May	2022	Vlissingen and Alblasserdam	Netherlands	3	2	F	Sentenced to 30 years in prison and compulsory psychiatric treatment	
Lundin Pettersson, Anton Niclas, 21	22 Oct	2015	Trollhättan	Sweden	3	2	M	Killed by police	
Nadyrshin, Valery, 20	2 Sep	2004	Lipovtsy, Primorsky Krai	Russia	3	1	F	Sentenced to life imprisonment	
Unknown	5 June	1960	Espoo, Uusimaa	Finland	3	1	M	Unsolved	
Sillanpää, Sanna Riitta Liisa, 30	21 Feb	1999	Helsinki	Finland	3	1	F	Found not guilty by reason of insanity	
Mazurok, Yaroslav, 38	26 Sep	2012	Kyiv	Ukraine	3	1	F	Committed suicide	
Letby, Lucy, 25	8–22 June	2015		United Kingdom	3	1	P	Sentenced to a whole life tariff	
Ibragimov, Artur, 35	13 Jan	2019	Uchaly, Bashkortostan	Russia	3	1	F	Committed suicide	
Borisov, Sergei, 64	29 Jan	2025	Usokhi, Kaluga Oblast	Russia	3	0	F	Committed suicide	
Mudarov, Zia	29 June	1978	Baku	Soviet Union	3	0	F	Committed suicide	
Averin, Nikolai, 31	13 June	1993	Kozelsk, Kaluga Oblast	Russia	3	0	M	Sent for compulsory psychiatric treatment	
Karlsson, Roger, 32	29 Jan – 1 Feb	2001	Gothenburg	Sweden	3	0	M	Sent for compulsory psychiatric treatment. Released in 2004.	

== Home intruders ==
Perpetrator	Date	Year	Location	Country	Killed	Injured	W	Additional Notes	Ref.
Egorov, Sergey Vladimirovich, 45 (Егоров, Сергей Владимирович)	June 4	2017	Redkino	Russia	9	0	FM	Sentenced to life imprisonment	
Angerstein, Fritz, 33	Dec 1	1924	Haiger	Weimar Republic	8	0	MA	Sentenced to death and executed Also killed a dog	
Belov, Oleg, 51	July 27 — 3 August	2015	Nizhny Novgorod, Gorokhovets, Vladimir Oblast	Russia	8	0	M	Sentenced to life imprisonment with compulsory psychiatric treatment	
Williams, John, 27	Dec 7/19	1811	London, England	United Kingdom	7	0	M	Committed suicide while awaiting trial	
Malmelin, Karl Emil, 27	May 10	1899	Klaukkala, Nurmijärvi	Russian Empire	7	0	M	Sentenced to life imprisonment	
Unknown	April 13	1918	Tuorakka	Finland	7	0	F	Unsolved	
Ughetto, Paul, 18	Oct 21	1936	Lardiers	France	7	0	F	Killed	
Kulakov, Valeriy, 25 (Кулаков, Валерий)	Oct 29	1996	Yekaterinburg	Russia	7	0	M	Sentenced to death, later changed to life imprisonment	
Kaya, Mehmet, 34	Nov 9	1999	Bielefeld	Germany	7	0	F	Committed suicide	
Makhov, Alexander, 29 (Махов, Александр)	Oct 8	2002	Kondopoga	Russia	7	0	MA	Sentenced to life imprisonment	
Haroutunian, Joanes, 43	Jan 31	1930	Marseille	France	6	1	F	Committed suicide	
Dolique, Pascal, 23	Oct 6	1983	Saint-Martin-le-Noeud	France	6	1	M	Sentenced to life imprisonment Witness died from heart attack	
Kiselev, Maksim Viktorovych, 26–27 (Киселёв, Максим Викторович)	Feb 26	2008	Orton	Russia	6	1	M	Sentenced to life imprisonment	
Marić, Rajko	Jan 18/19	1901	Semlin	Austria-Hungary	6	0	M	Sentenced to death and executed	
Unknown	March 31	1922	Hinterkaifeck	(Germany) Weimar Republic	6	0	M	Unsolved	
Koljonen, Toivo Harald, 30	March 17	1943	Karhiniemi	Finland	6	0	M	Sentenced to death and executed	
Thami, Abbad, 31	Oct 11	1982	Berre-l'Étang & Mallemort	France	6	0	F	Committed suicide	
Neuville, Henri 53*	July 12	1993	Metz-Magny	France	6	0	F	Committed suicide	
Capan, Josip Joko, 44	July 6	1995	Vidovci	Croatia	6	0	F	Killed by explosion	
Vasilenko, Sergei Nikolayevich, 21 (Василенко, Сергей Николаевич)	Feb 11	2005	Verkhny Ufaley	Russia	6	0	M	Sentenced to life imprisonment	
Sayfutdinov, Arslan Faritovich, 19 (Сайфутдинов, Арслан Фаритович)	Dec 31	2005	Karamzino	Russia	6	0	M	Sentenced to life imprisonment	
Angelov, Rosen Zhelev, 56 (Ангелов, Росен Желев)	Dec 31	2017	Novi Iskar	Bulgaria	6	0	F	Committed suicide Also killed a dog	
Nađ, Igor, 36	Aug 1	2019	Kajzerica	Croatia	6	0	F	Committed suicide	
Pilkington, ---	Oct 31	1892	Ballinadrimna, Ireland	(United Kingdom of Great Britain and Ireland) United Kingdom	5–6	2–4	FMA	Committed suicide	
Bernardy, Nicolas, 47	July 21	1945	Wandhaff	Luxembourg	5	0	F	Sentenced to death and executed	
Gritsuk, Vadim, 41 (Грицук, Вадим)	April 27	2000	Omsk	Russia	5	0	M	Serial killer. Sentenced to life imprisonment	
Konev, Alexander	April 27	1976	Tambov	Soviet Union	4	0	M	Sentenced to death	
Ranga	Aug 1/2	1930	Naruja	Romania	3–7	0–4	FM	Killed by police	
17-year-old boy 14-year-old girl	Jan 22	2022	Yuryevka, Omsk Oblast	Russia	3	0	M	Boy sentenced to 6 years 7 months prison, commuted to 6 years 6 months Girl sentenced to 6 years 6 months, commuted to 6 years 4 months	
Ermakov, Vladislav, 22	Oct 17	2018	Moscow	Russia	3	0	M	Sentenced to compulsory psychiatric treatment	
Lazarev, Alexander, 29	Sep 29	2021	Gai, Orenburg Oblast	Russia	3	0	M	Detained 4 days later and sentenced to life imprisonment	
Clifford, Kyle Marcus, 26	Jul 9	2024	Bushey	(United Kingdom of Great Britain and Ireland) United Kingdom	3	0	FM	Sentenced to life imprisonment	

== Familicides ==
The victims must have been largely the relatives of the perpetrator to be considered a familicide.

Perpetrator	Date	Year	Location	Country	Killed	Injured	W	Additional notes	Ref.
Austin, Thomas		1694	Cullompton, Mid Devon, Devon	England	10	0	FM	Sentenced to death and executed	
Girerd, Roger, 34*	May 20	1965	Charvieu-Chavagneux	France	10	0	FM	Committed suicide Killed a dog	
Brückner, Wilhelm, 31*	June 6/7	1925	Hassenberg & Lindenberg	Weimar Republic	9	1	M	Committed suicide	
Bihl, Christoff*	Aug 25	1580	Zabern	Holy Roman Empire	9	0	M	Sentenced to death and executed	
King, Leonard, 40*	Sep 18	1954	Shotton, Flintshire, Wales	United Kingdom	8	1	MP	Committed suicide Also killed a dog	
Eisenbeiß, Hans, 42	April 28	1606	Eliasbrunn	Holy Roman Empire	8	0	M	Sentenced to death and executed Terminated a pregnancy	
Thode, Timm, 23	Aug 7/8	1866	Groß-Campen	German Confederation	8	0	MA	Sentenced to death and executed Also killed a dog and wounded another	
Diószegi, Flórián	Aug 21	1893	Hódmezővásárhely	Austria-Hungary	8	0	M	Sentenced to life imprisonment	
Pablo Gideon*	Dec.	1915	Dörfl	German Empire	8	0	M	Committed suicide	
Lambrecht, Karl, 52*	June 6	1934	Aichhalden	Nazi Germany	8	0		Committed suicide	
Kecinski, Harry, 44*	April 20/21	1970	Fahrdorf	West Germany	8	0	F	Committed suicide	
Belov, Oleg Petrovich, 51* (Белов, Олег Петрович)	July 27/ 3 Aug	2015	Nizhny Novgorod	Russia	8	0	M	Sentenced to life imprisonment Terminated a pregnancy	
Zykaj, Ritvan, 24	Aug 10	2018	Resulaj	Albania	8	0	F	Sentenced to life imprisonment	
Čedić, Dragan, 31 (Драган Чедић)	July 26/27	2002	Leskovac	Serbia and Montenegro	7	4	F	Committed suicide	
Svoboda, Josef, 43	Feb 27/28	1967	Jeseník	Czechoslovakia	7	3	M	Committed suicide	
Staridas, Spyros Athanasios, 33 (Σπυρος Αθανάσιος Σταριδας)	June 28	1981	Trikala	Greece	7	3	F	Committed suicide	
Taylor, Frank*	March 7	1895	London, England	(United Kingdom of Great Britain and Ireland) United Kingdom	7	1	M	Committed suicide	
Endres, Blasius	Aug 9	1585	Wangen im Allgäu	Holy Roman Empire	7	0	M	Sentenced to death and executed Terminated a pregnancy	
Unknown*	June 12	1597	Sprottau	Holy Roman Empire	7	0		Sentenced to death and executed	
Mosenheuer, Michel*	Jan 13	1616	Benterode	Holy Roman Empire	7	0	M	Committed suicide	
Rosenzweig, Heinrich*	Jan 2	1621	Quedlinburg	Holy Roman Empire	7	0	M	Sentenced to death and executed	
Whitworth, William Henry, 39*	May 18	1860	Sandown Fort, Isle of Wight, England	(United Kingdom of Great Britain and Ireland) United Kingdom	7	0	M	Found not guilty by reason of insanity	
Duggan, Walter James*	June 28	1869	London, England	(United Kingdom of Great Britain and Ireland) United Kingdom	7	0	P	Committed suicide	
Derby, Samuel Hill, 35*	Feb	1888	Salford, Greater Manchester, England	(United Kingdom of Great Britain and Ireland) United Kingdom	7	0	P	Committed suicide	
Bienert, Ernst Julius*	Dec 14/15	1903	Meißen	German Empire	7	0	P	Attempted suicide	
Boronkoff, Ivan*	March 17	1904	Kotjoff	Russian Empire	7	0	M	Committed suicide	
Bratz, Alfred, 50*	Jan 9	1914	Soldau	German Empire	7	0	FMP	Committed suicide Also killed a dog	
Schützenhöfer, Anna, 43*	Nov 30	1915	Dörfl	Austria-Hungary	7	0	M	Committed suicide	
Fastman, Robert, 25*	May 3	1919	Lusi	Finland	7	0	M	Found not guilty by reason of insanity	
Cavel, Johann	July 31	1928	Körmend	Hungary	7	0	F	Committed suicide	
Giebel, Friedrich, 38*	Oct 19/20	1940	Mainz	Nazi Germany	7	0	M	Committed suicide	
Hansen, Peter Christian, 36*	April 14	1949	Nejede	Denmark	7	0	M	Found not guilty by reason of insanity	
Capek, Franz, 41*	Oct 7	1956	Waltersdorf	Austria	7	0	M	Committed suicide	
Antonello, Mauro, 40	Oct 15	2002	Chieri	Italy	7	0	F	Committed suicide	
Asadullin, Khubulla Abdullovich, 54 (Асадуллин, Хубулла Абдуллович)	Aug 18	2005	Chelyabinsk	Russia	7	0	MA	Sentenced to life imprisonment	
Schurr, Adrian, 26	Jan 24	2020	Rot am See	Germany	6	2	F	Sentenced to 15 years in prison	
Rundström, Anders	Nov 5	1833	Roukalahti	Russian Empire	6	1	M	Attempted suicide	
Wilsdorf, Edmund Hermann*	March 9/10	1907	Dresden	German Empire	6	1	F	Committed suicide	
Karapetiez, ---	March 31	1907	Alexandropol	Russian Empire	6	1	M	Committed suicide	
Haroutunian, Joanes, 43*	Jan 31	1930	Marseille	France	6	1	F	Committed suicide	
Tymkow, Wasyl, 30	Feb 10	1937	Krasne	Poland	6	1	F	Attempted suicide	
Barboux, Roger, 33	Oct 19	1954	Dun-le-Poëlier	France	6	1	FMA	Committed suicide	
Kaya, Hakan, 24*	Dec 22	2000	Salzgitter	Germany	6	1	F	Sentenced to life imprisonment Terminated a pregnancy	
Petrović, Tomislav, 45	May 29	2008	Gornja Lipnica & Trstje	Bosnia and Herzegovina	6	1	F	Found not guilty by reason of insanity	
Šefer, Rade, 55* (Раде Шефер)	May 17	2015	Orom & Martonoš	Serbia	6	1	F	Killed	
Unknown*		1614	Valencia	Spain	6	0		Sentenced to death and executed	
Rüsau, Johann Georg, 51–52*	Aug 15	1803	Hamburg	Holy Roman Empire	6	0	M	Sentenced to death and executed	
Moog, Johann Gottlieb*	Aug 21	1817	Frankfurt	German Confederation	6	0	M	Committed suicide Terminated a pregnancy	
Holzwart, Christian*	Dec 28/29	1845	Sudenburg	German Confederation	6	0	MA	Sentenced to death	
Brough, Mary Ann, 43*	June 10	1854	Esher, London, England	(United Kingdom of Great Britain and Ireland) United Kingdom	6	0	M	Found not guilty by reason of insanity	
Unknown*		1856	Livorno	Italy	6	0	M	Committed suicide	
Rodewald, Eduard, 34*	Jan 8	1862	Neu-Sobrusan	Austria-Hungary	6	0	M	Sentenced to death	
Errigo, Giuseppe*	June	1870	Casa Taverna	Italy	6	0	FM	Committed suicide	
Ruchalski, ---*	June 17/18	1875	Zendowo	German Empire	6	0	M	Committed suicide	
Grosgeorge, Jean-Baptiste, 41*	May 28	1889	Rougiville	France	6	0	M	Committed suicide	
Head, Peter Robert*	Sep 22	1905	Amesbury, Wiltshire, England	(United Kingdom of Great Britain and Ireland) United Kingdom	6	0	M	Committed suicide	
Glaser, Anton, 30*	April 8/9	1907	Dortmund	German Empire	6	0	M	Committed suicide	
Nielsen, Maren	July	1907	Tvis	Denmark	6	0	M	Committed suicide	
Bouvier, Alexis-Désiré, 37*	Dec 11	1909	Toulon	France	6	0	FM	Committed suicide	
Zautze, ---*	Sep 12	1911	Wassel	German Empire	6	0	M	Committed suicide	
Husak, Franz, 44*	Feb 4	1913	Prague	Austria-Hungary	6	0	P	Committed suicide	
Denk, Johann, 49*	April	1916	Mühlbach	German Empire	6	0	F	Committed suicide	
Hecker, ---*	Jan 22/23	1917	Weilheim	German Empire	6	0	M	Committed suicide	
Blaschkowski, Johann, 44	June 17	1926	Dortmund	Weimar Republic	6	0	M	Committed suicide	
Lewandowski, Leon, 21	Feb 24	1927	Groß-Tarpnia	Poland	6	0	M	Sentenced to death	
Hapczuk, Iwan*	June 2/3	1927	Zabie	Poland	6	0	FMA	Sentenced to death	
Müller, ---, 30*	March 1	1930	Chemnitz	Weimar Republic	6	0	P	Committed suicide	
Poikonen, Onni Eemil, 36*	Sep 21	1930	Karstula	Finland	6	0	MA	Perished in the fire	
Delafé, Pierre*	Feb 9	1932	Moirax	France	6	0	FM	Sentenced to death	
Meurer, Kurt Wilhelm, 37	March 24/25	1932	Jena	Weimar Republic	6	0	F	Committed suicide	
Studnitz, Anton, 37*	July	1934	Rybnik	Poland	6	0	P	Committed suicide	
Monchaux, Alfred, 44*	Oct 12	1934	Cambron	France	6	0	MA	Committed suicide	
Tainio, Lauri, 43*	Jan 27	1937	Hietala	Finland	6	0	F	Committed suicide	
Ochea, Albundi*	March	1937	Transsylvania	Romania	6	0	M	Committed suicide	
Schaßberger, Hugo, 37*	Aug 27	1938	Stuttgart	Nazi Germany	6	0	MA	Committed suicide	
Devillechaise, Paul, 41*	March 18	1939	Autun	France	6	0	FM	Committed suicide while awaiting trial	
Unknown*		1943	Chukotka	Soviet Union	6	0		Committed suicide	
Damm, Auguste, 43*	April 26	1943	Zürich	Switzerland	6	0	F	Committed suicide	
Lehtikoski, Ervi Matti, 31*	Aug 21	1944	Kainasto	Finland	6	0	FM	Committed suicide	
Serval, Jean*	Oct 11	1950	Essey-lès-Nancy	France	6	0	P	Committed suicide	
Gillette, Léon, 70*	April 15	1952	Le Tronquay	France	6	0	MA	Committed suicide	
Ruiz Martínez, José Maria, 45*	May 1	1962	Madrid	Spain	6	0	FM	Committed suicide	
Suni, Uuno Ensio, 36*	25 Sep	1962	Muukko	Finland	6	0	M	Committed suicide	
Buschbeck, Kurt-Hermann, 44*	4/5 Aug	1968	Breitenbach	West Germany	6	0	MO	Committed suicide	
Vestergaard, Søren, 49*	28 Jan	1969	Hee	Denmark	6	0	FM	Committed suicide	
Leifeld, Liselotte, 33*	23 Sep	1969	Ahlen	West Germany	6	0	F P	Committed suicide	
Sobok, Ryszard, 29	11/12 Feb	1981	Walim	Poland	6	0	M	Sentenced to death and executed Terminated a pregnancy	
Deraymaeker, Josef, 63*	23/24 Feb	1985	Overijse	Belgium	6	0	F	Committed suicide	
Püschner, Karl-Heinz, 36*	12 Feb	1986	Geisenfeld	West Germany	6	0	MP	Committed suicide	
Le Van Than, 41*	10 July	1994	Coudekerque-Branche	France	6	0	M	Committed suicide	
Demule, Guy, 37	19 July	1994	Châtillon-sur-Chalaronne	France	6	0	FM	Committed suicide	
Polevoi, Alexi, 17	27 Feb	1995	Paris	France	6	0	F	Sentenced to eight years in prison	
Valente, Alfredo, 33*	19 Nov	1996	Buonvicino	Italy	6	0	F	Sentenced to 30 years in prison	
Selamet, Ozan, 42	18 Jan	2002	Brussels	Belgium	6	0	FM	Sentenced to life imprisonment	
McElhill, Arthur, 39*	13 Nov	2007	Omagh, County Tyrone, Northern Ireland	United Kingdom	6	0	A	Perished in the fire	
Rzeszowski, Damian, 30	14 Aug	2011	Saint Helier	Jersey	6	0	M	Sentenced to six concurrent 30-year terms	
Chambers, John*	?	1725	Simer, North Yorkshire, England	(Kingdom of Great Britain) Great Britain	6	?		Sentenced to death and executed	
Hall, Frederick*	31 May	1898	Nettlebank, Staffordshire, England	(United Kingdom of Great Britain and Ireland) United Kingdom	5–6	0–1	M	Committed suicide Terminated a pregnancy	
Seelenberg, Hermann*	13 July	1910	Helmstedt	German Empire	5–6	0–1	F	Committed suicide	
Bertling, ---*	June	1917	Gotha	German Empire	5–6	0–1	F	Attempted suicide	
Niballi, Antonio, 44*	May	1893	Nicastro	Italy	5–6	0	F	Committed suicide	
Gray, Edmond, 52*	23 Jan	1934	Berzée	Belgium	4–6	0–2	M	Committed suicide	
Rosner, Johann, 23	28/29 Oct	1875	Kirchfidisch	Austria-Hungary	4–6	0	MA	Sentenced to death and executed	
Ikanović, Nail, 26	Oct 14	1970	Raljaš	(Socialist Republic of Bosnia and Herzegovina) SR Bosnia	4	0	M	Committed suicide	
Zienertová, Romana, 36	Sep 2	2011	Široký Důl	Czechoslovakia	4	0	M	Sentenced to life imprisonment	
Undisclosed*	?	1976	Vaduz	Liechtenstein	3	1	F	Sentenced to death; later commuted to 15 years imprisonment	
Lomnitzky, Josef*	Dec	1930	Ardanova	Czechoslovakia	3–8	0–5	P	Committed suicide	
Gorbatko, Alexander, 44	11 May	1998	Semiluki, Voronezh	Russia	3	0	M	Sent for compulsory psychiatric treatment	
Undisclosed*	Dec	2025	Vaduz	Liechtenstein	3	0	M	Committed suicide	

== Abbreviations and footnotes ==
* – Marks cases where all the victims were relatives of the perpetrator

W – A basic description of the weapons used in the murders

F – Firearms and other ranged weapons, especially rifles and handguns, but also bows and crossbows, grenade launchers, flamethrowers, or slingshots
M – Melee weapons, like knives, swords, spears, machetes, axes, clubs, rods, stones, or bare hands
O – Any other weapons, such as bombs, hand grenades, Molotov cocktails, poison and poisonous gas, as well as vehicle and arson attacks

A – indicates that an arson attack was the only other weapon used
V – indicates that a vehicle was the only other weapon used
E – indicates that explosives of any sort were the only other weapon used
P – indicates that an anaesthetising or deadly substance of any kind was the only other weapon used (includes poisonous gas)
