= List of mass shootings in Russia =

This is a list of known mass shootings – in this case, incidents that resulted in at least four injured or killed – that have occurred in Russia.

== 1990s ==
| Date | Location | Subject | Dead | Injured | Total | Description |
|---|---|---|---|---|---|---|
| 26 March 1992 | Kyakhta | Buryatia | 8 | 2 | 10 | An unknown soldier killed eight soldiers and wounded two others. |
| 26 April 1992 | Kazan | Tatarstan | 9 | 1 | 10 | 1992 Tatarstan shooting: Andrei Shpagonov killed nine people and wounded another while trying to steal firearms during a robbery. He was sentenced to death and executed in 1995. |
| 26 October 1992 | Yekaterinburg | Sverdlovsk Oblast | 4 | 0 | 4 | 1992 Yekaterinburg shooting: Bandits shot and killed four people. |
| 7 March 1993 | | Near Moscow | 5 (Note: Including the perpetrator.) | 1 | 6 | A soldier opened fire at a base near Moscow, killing four servicemen and seriously injuring a fifth before fatally shooting himself. |
| 19 July 1993 | Moscow | Moscow | 1 | 6 (Note: Including one perpetrator.) | 7 | A drive-by shooting in front of a car shop left one person dead and six others wounded, including one of the perpetrators. |
| 4 March 1994 | Moscow | Moscow | 7 | 1 | 8 | Seven people were killed and another wounded at an office on the premises of the All-Russian Scientific Research Institute of Physical Education. |
| 8 March 1994 | Tanfiliev Island | Sakhalin Oblast | 6 | 3 | 9 | Dmitry Belkov and Andrei Bogdashin shot dead six soldiers and wounded three. |
| 18 October 1994 | Moscow | Moscow | 2 | 3 | 5 | Bandits killed two and injured three people. |
| 10 January 1995 | Chita | Zabaykalsky Krai | 5 | 1 | 6 | Bandits killed five people and injured one. |
| 30 July 1995 | Popov Island | Primorsky Krai | 5 | 6 | 11 | Vyacheslav Bugakov shot and killed five soldiers and wounded six others. |
| 5 August 1995 | Moscow | Moscow | 4 | 0 | 4 | Alexander Pustovalov and an unknown person killed four people. |
| September 1995 | Moscow | Moscow | 0 | 8 | 8 | A man with a rifle shot and wounded eight people at a wedding party. |
| 14 November 1995 | Chindant outpost in the Transbaikal | Zabaykalsky Krai | 2 | 3 | 5 | Valery Sakharov killed two soldiers and wounded three others. |
| 20 November 1995 | Saratov | Saratov Oblast | 12 | 1 | 13 | Murder of Igor Chikunov: two unknown people killed 12 people and wounded one. |
| 26 February 1996 | Kuzovlevo | Tomsk Oblast | 4 (Note: Including two perpetrators.) | 0 | 4 | Yuri Dovgan and Alexander Kochetkov killed two officers before being killed by another soldier. |
| 26 February 1996 | Saint Petersburg | | 3 | 1 | 4 | Multiple gunmen opened fire at the Nevskij Palace Hotel, injuring a gangster and killing his two bodyguards and a bystander. |
| 26 February 1996 | Timashevsk | Krasnodar Krai | 7 | 1 | 8 | Bandits shot dead seven people and wounded one. |
| 11 July 1996 | Irkutsk | Irkutsk Oblast | 4 | 3 | 7 | Shooting in Irkutsk: During the gang clashes, four people were killed and three were injured. |
| 28 July 1996 | Moscow | Moscow | 5 | 0 | 5 | Bandits shot and killed five people. |
| 10 October 1996 | Smirnykh | Sakhalin Oblast | 4 | 0 | 4 | Sergey Khrushch and Konstantin Krylov shot dead four soldiers. |
| 19 November 1996 | Kazan | Tatarstan | 6 | 0 | 6 | 65-year-old scientist Karen Zhamogortian shot and killed four of his colleagues, his wife and himself. |
| 4 January 1997 | Perm | Perm Krai | 4 | 3 | 7 | Oleg Lokhmatov shot dead three soldiers and one civilian and wounded three civilians. |
| 9 March 1997 | Kamyshin | Volgograd Oblast | 6 | 2 | 8 | Kamyshin school shooting: Sergey Lepnev shot and killed five cadets and commander and wounded two other cadets. |
| 24 May 1997 | Balagansk | Irkutsk Oblast | 4 | 6 | 10 | A drunken shepherd killed four people and wounded six others with a hunting rifle. |
| 29 May 1997 | Gusinoozyorsk | Buryatia | 6 | 0 | 6 | Yevgeny Gorbunov shot and killed six soldiers. |
| 31 July 1997 | Moscow | Moscow | 4 | 1 | 5 | Goncharnaya Street shooting: in the shootout, three militsioners were killed, one bandit was killed and another bandit was wounded. |
| 1 October 1997 | Dolgoprudny | Moscow Oblast | 4 | 0 | 4 | Bandits killed 4 militsioners at the checkpoint at the entrance to the town, presumably for the purpose of stealing their weapons. |
| 23 November 1997 | Zabaykalsk | Zabaykalsky Krai | 5 | 1 | 6 | An 18-year-old private opened fire on six fellow guards with a Kalashnikov semi-automatic rifle, killing five and seriously wounding one. |
| 26 January 1998 | Pobedino | Sakhalin Oblast | 7 | 1 | 8 | 1998 Sakhalin military base shooting: Oleg Naumov killed seven soldiers and wounded one. |
| 10 September 1998 | Severomorsk | Murmansk Oblast | 9 | 2 | 11 | 1998 Vepr incident: Alexander Kuzminykh stabbed to death a guard, then shot dead seven other soldiers and wounded two. After several hours he was killed by the FSB (later reports indicated that he committed suicide). |
| 8 October 1999 | Mikenskaya | Chechnya | 35 | 20+ | 55+ | Mikenskaya shooting: Ahmed Ibragimov shot dead 35 people and wounded more than 20 others. |

== 2000s ==
| Date | Location | Subject | Dead | Injured | Total | Description |
|---|---|---|---|---|---|---|
| 7 April 2000 | Zenzevatka | Volgograd Oblast | 8 | 0 | 8 | Oleg Dolzhenko shot dead eight soldiers. |
| 30 September 2000 | Solikamsk | Perm Krai | 2 | 6 | 8 | Alexey Skorobogatykh killed two soldiers and wounded six others. |
| 21 November 2000 | Tolyatti | Samara Oblast | 7 | 0 | 7 | Two bandits killed seven people. |
| 5 July 2001 | Urgaksh | Kirov Oblast | 3 | 3 | 6 | Ramil Kasimov, the manager of an agricultural farm in Sovetsky District, fatally shot three people and injured three others. |
| 8 July 2001 | Kamensk-Shakhtinsky | Rostov Oblast | 6 | 1 | 7 | Denis Smyshlyaev and Yevgeny Samoilov shot dead six soldiers and wounded one. |
| 6 August 2001 | Abakan | Khakassia | 4 | 0 | 4 | Denis Pertsev shot and killed four soldiers. |
| 19 August 2001 | Chelyabinsk | Chelyabinsk Oblast | 3 | 1 | 4 | Alexander Chobotov shot and killed three people and wounded another. |
| 31 January 2002 | Uelen | Chukotka Autonomous Okrug | 4 | 0 | 4 | Andrei Rastegaev shot dead four soldiers. |
| 3–5 February 2002 | Buinsk | Tatarstan | 11 | 2 | 13 | Almaz Shageev and Mikhail Sukhorukov killed nine people and injured two others. Shageev killed Sukhorukov and then killed himself. |
| 11 April 2002 | Makhachkala | Dagestan | 2 | 2 | 4 | Turar Abugaliev shot and killed two soldiers and wounded one and then wounded himself. |
| 23 August 2002 | | Ingushetia | 8 | 0 | 8 | Oleg Khismatulin and Nikolai Bozhkov shot dead eight soldiers. |
| 25 August 2002 | Yaroslavsky | Primorsky Krai | 5 | 10 | 15 | Yaroslavsky shooting: Sergey Semidovsky killed five people and injured ten others. |
| 29 November 2002 | Ptysh border post | Karachay-Cherkessia | 5 | 6 | 11 | Denis Soloviev killed five soldiers and wounded six others. |
| 20 February 2003 | | Krasnoyarsk Krai | 5 | 0 | 5 | Sergey Khanov shot dead four soldiers and himself. |
| 17 February 2004 | Gar' | Kirov Oblast | 6 | 0 | 6 | Alexey Shilnikov shot dead six people. |
| 2 September 2004 | Lipovtsy | Primorsky Krai | 3 | 1 | 4 | 20-year-old soldier Valery Nadyrshin shot dead three militsioners. He was arrested after nine days on the run. |
| 7 September 2004 | Surgut | Khanty-Mansi Autonomous Okrug | 4 | 5 | 9 | Four people were killed and five other people wounded when several shooters opened fire at a cafe. |
| 7 February 2005 | Vladivostok | Primorsky krai | 4 | 1 | 5 | 25-year-old former investigator Anton Vlasov killed three people and wounded one with two pistols in a prosecutor's office, before committing suicide on the spot. |
| 15 March 2005 | Amurskaya post | Chita Oblast | 7 | 1 | 8 | Four soldiers killed six people. |
| 2006 | Medvezhyegorsk | Republic of Karelia | 5 | 0 | 5 | Nikolai Sochnev killed five people. |
| 6 February 2007 | Kapustin Yar | Astrakhan Oblast | 3 | 1 | 4 | Pyotr Babin shot and killed two soldiers and wounded one more and then shot himself. |
| 23 April 2007 | Balashikha | Moscow Oblast | 4 | 0 | 4 | 2007 Balashikha shooting: Alexander Levin shot dead four people. |
| 23 September 2007 | Novosibirsk | Novosibirsk Oblast | 2 | 5 | 7 | Two people were killed and five people were wounded during a shootout in a nightclub in the Oktyabrsky district. |
| 7 July 2008 | near Ussuriysk | Primorsky Krai | 4 | 0 | 4 | Vladimir Dienes shot dead three soldiers and killed himself. |
| 13 April 2009 | Borzoy | Chechnya | 3 | 1 | 4 | Daniil Kharkovsky shot and killed three soldiers and wounded himself. |
| 27 April 2009 | Moscow | Moscow | 2 | 7 | 9 | Evsyukov murder case: Denis Evsyukov shot and killed two people and wounded seven others. |

== 2010s ==
| Date | Location | Subject | Dead | Injured | Total | Description |
|---|---|---|---|---|---|---|
| 19 October 2010 | Grozny | Chechnya | 7 (Note: Including four perpetrators.) | 17 | 24 | 2010 Chechen Parliament attack: three people died and 17 were wounded, four attackers were also killed. |
| 21 January 2011 | Stavropol | Stavropol Krai | 8 | 0 | 8 | Stavropol shooting: Roman Gubarev shot and killed eight people. |
| 23 April 2012 | Armavir | Krasnodar Krai | 1 | 4 | 5 | Five people were shot, one fatally, when two gunmen entered a cafe and opened fire. |
| 26 August 2012 | Pestravka | Samara Oblast | 0 | 7 | 7 | A dispute at a cafe led to shots being fired into a crowd, wounding seven people. |
| 28 August 2012 | Belidzhi | Dagestan | 8 | 6 | 14 | Ramzan Aliyev shot and killed seven soldiers and wounded six others, after which he was shot dead by soldiers. |
| 7 November 2012 | Moscow | Moscow | 6 | 1 | 7 | 2012 Moscow shooting: Dmitry Vinogradov shot and killed six people and wounded another at his workplace with a shotgun. |
| 22 April 2013 | Belgorod | Belgorod Oblast | 6 | 0 | 6 | 2013 Belgorod shooting: Sergey Pomazun shot six people dead in a gun store and the street. He was arrested the next day. |
| 8 January 2014 | | Stavropol Krai | 6 | 0 | 6 | Three militants shot dead six people. |
| 9 February 2014 | Yuzhno-Sakhalinsk | Sakhalin Oblast | 2 | 6 | 8 | Yuzhno-Sakhalinsk cathedral shooting: Stepan Komarov shot dead two people and injured six others. |
| 27 January 2015 | Blagoveshchensk | Amur Oblast | 4 | 0 | 4 | Vladimir Lyovkin killed three people and then himself. |
| 26 August 2015 | Pesochnoye | Kostroma Oblast | 6 | 1 | 7 | 18-year-old Pavel Bakhtin killed the officer and five soldiers, and wounded another, before shooting himself. |
| 26 September 2015 | Simferopol | Republic of Crimea | 3 | 2 | 4 | Bekir Nebiev: Bekir Nebiev shot dead two people and wounded two others, before shooting himself. |
| 19 October 2015 | Krasnogorsky District | Moscow Oblast | 5 | 0 | 4 | Amiran Georgadze: Amiran Georgadze shot and killed four people, and then shot himself the next day. |
| 14 December 2015 | Moscow | Moscow | 2 | 8 | 10 | Rochdelskaya Street shooting: ten people were shot, two fatally, during a shootout at a cafe. |
| 31 January 2016 | Shlisselburg | Leningrad Oblast | 2 | 3 | 5 | Two men were killed and three were wounded during a dispute. |
| 22 February 2016 | Tyumen | Tyumen Oblast | 0 | 4 | 4 | A group of friends opened fire at a nightclub, injuring four people. |
| 27 March 2016 | Yakovlevskoye | Moscow Oblast | 1 | 3 | 4 | 55-year-old Alexei Bychkov shot and killed one person and wounded three others. |
| 8 May 2016 | Chelokhovo | Moscow Oblast | 5 | 0 | 5 | 2016 Yegoryevsk shooting: Ilya Aseev killed five people and was arrested the next day. |
| 5 June 2016 | Mytischi | Moscow Oblast | 0 | 4 | 4 | Four men were injured during a dispute between two groups. |
| 26 July 2016 | Magas | Ingushetia | 1 | 4 | 5 | A domestic dispute escalated into a shooting, killing the local chief of police, Isa Yevloyev, and injuring four others. |
| 10 August 2016 | Maltsevo | Mordovia | 3 | 0 | 3 | Grigory Gryaznov shot to death three people. |
| 3 September 2016 | Yekaterinburg | Sverdlovsk Oblast | 2 | 7 | 9 | 38-year-old Oleg Shishov shot and killed two people and injured seven others with a rifle. |
| 23 October 2016 | Pyt-Yakh | Khanty-Mansi Autonomous Okrug | 0 | 4 | 4 | Four people were wounded in a dispute inside a cafe. |
| 30 October 2016 | Yekaterinburg | Sverdlovsk Oblast | 0 | 5 | 5 | A man injured five people at a nightclub. |
| 5 December 2016 | Stavropol | Stavropol Krai | 0 | 4 | 4 | A security guard at a bar shot and wounded four people during a confrontation with patrons. |
| 15 December 2016 | Olsha | Smolensk Oblast | 5 | 3 | 8 | Georgy Borisovich Yudaev shot and killed four people and wounded three, before shooting himself. |
| 27 December 2016 | Moscow | Moscow | 1 | 5 | 6 | 45-year-old K. Lunkov injured five people with a shotgun before committing suicide. |
| 21 April 2017 | Khabarovsk | Khabarovsk Krai | 4 | 1 | 5 | Khabarovsk FSB attack: 17-year-old Anton Vyacheslavovich Konev shot and killed two people in the FSB reception room and wounded another one and killed himself. Before the attack, he shot dead an instructor in a shooting range. |
| 4 June 2017 | Redkino | Tver Oblast | 9 | 0 | 9 | Redkino shooting: Sergey Egorov killed nine people at a late night party with a Saiga-12S shotgun over a domestic dispute, he was arrested shortly after. |
| 10–11 June 2017 | Kratovo | Moscow Oblast | 6 | 6 | 12 | Kratovo shooting Igor Zenkov killed five people and wounded six and then shot himself. |
| 29 September 2017 | Belogorsk | Amur Oblast | 3 | 2 | 5 | Hasan Abdulakhadov shot and killed three soldiers and wounded two others and was shot the next day. |
| 23 October 2017 | Shelkovskaya | Chechnya | 5 | 0 | 5 | Marat Hajiyev shot to death four soldiers after which he was killed by other soldiers. |
| 18 February 2018 | Kizlyar | Dagestan | 6 | 4 | 10 | Kizlyar church shooting: Khalil Khalilov shot dead five people and wounded four others, after which he was killed by the police. |
| 27 February 2018 | Kazan | Tatarstan | 2 | 2 | 4 | A 36-year-old man killed a Rosgvardiya soldier in a shootout and was later killed. |
| 24 May 2018 | Bulgunnyakhtakh | Sakha Republic | 6 | 0 | 6 | 66-year-old Alexander Novikov killed five people and committed suicide. |
| 17 October 2018 | Kerch | Republic of Crimea | 21 | 73 | 94 | Kerch Polytechnic College massacre: a student, Vladislav Roslyakov, detonated a bomb and opened fire with a shotgun, before fatally shooting himself. |
| 13 January 2019 | Uchaly | Bashkortostan | 4 | 1 | 5 | 35-year-old Artur Ibragimov shot dead his wife, two neighbors, and wounded another, after which he shot himself. |
| 22 October 2019 | Chernozubov | Rostov Oblast | 5 | 2 | 7 | During the shootout, five people died and two were wounded. |
| 25 October 2019 | Gorny | Zabaykalsky Krai | 8 | 2 | 10 | Gorny shooting: a conscript soldier opened fire on his colleagues during a change of guards. |
| 14 November 2019 | Blagoveshchensk | Amur Oblast | 2 | 3 | 5 | Blagoveshchensk college shooting: a 19-year-old student at the Amur college of construction opened fire at other students and then shot himself. |
| 4 December 2019 | Perm | Perm Krai | 1 | 3 | 4 | In the early morning, 50-year-old previously convicted Dmitry Korostelev opened fire with an illegally-owned shotgun at the people on the streets while he was in a state of drug (or alcohol, according to other sources) intoxication. Korostelev was wounded and detained. He was declared insane and was sent to compulsory treatment in November 2020. |
| 19 December 2019 | Moscow | Moscow | 3 | 5 | 8 | Moscow FSB headquarters shooting: Yevgeny Manyurov shot and killed two FSB operators and injured five people, after which he was shot dead by police. |

== 2020s ==
| Date | Location | Subject | Dead | Injured | Total | Description |
|---|---|---|---|---|---|---|
| 15 February 2020 | Kaliningrad | Kaliningrad Oblast | 4 (Note: includes an unborn child) | 1 | 5 | Fazil Bahramov shot dead a married couple and wounded their children before shooting himself. |
| 4 April 2020 | Yelatma | Ryazan Oblast | 5 | 0 | 5 | Anton Franchikov shot five people to death. |
| 18 June 2020 | Moscow | Moscow | 4 | 0 | 4 | Sevastyan Putintsev shot three people to death before shooting himself. |
| 12 October 2020 | Bolsheorlovskoe | Nizhny Novgorod Oblast | 5 | 2 | 7 | 2020 Bolsheorlovskoe shooting: Daniil Monakhov killed four people and wounded two more before shooting himself. |
| 7 November 2020 | Yekaterinburg | Sverdlovsk Oblast | 4 | 1 | 5 | Dmitry Zakharov killed three people and wounded another during the party at his apartment before shooting himself. |
| 11 May 2021 | Kazan | Tatarstan | 9 | 23 | 32 | Kazan school shooting: 19-year-old Ilnaz Galyaviev killed seven students and two teachers in his former gymnasium and injured 23 others before surrendering. |
| 27 June 2021 | Biser | Perm Krai | 3 | 1 | 4 | Sergei Shinkevich fatally shot three people and wounded one. |
| 20 September 2021 | Perm | Perm Krai | 6 | 24 | 30 | Perm State University shooting: Timur Bekmansurov fatally shot six people and wounded 23 others in and around the campus before being severely wounded and apprehended by police. |
| 7 December 2021 | Moscow | Moscow | 2 | 4 | 6 | Moscow Multifunctional Center shooting: a 45-year-old male shot and killed two people and wounded four others, reportedly after being told to put on a face mask. |
| 26 April 2022 | Veshkayma | Ulyanovsk Oblast | 5 | 1 | 6 | Veshkayma kindergarten shooting: Ruslan Akhtyamov fatally shot four people and wounded a fifth before committing suicide. |
| 15 July 2022 | Novoshakhtinsk | Rostov Oblast | 4 | 1 | 5 | Denys Mashonsky shot to death four people and wounded another. |
| 26 September 2022 | Izhevsk | Udmurtia | 19 | 23 | 42 | Izhevsk school shooting: 34-year-old Artyom Kazantsev opened fire at his former school before committing suicide. |
| 15 October 2022 | Soloti | Belgorod Oblast | 13 | 15 | 28 | Soloti military training ground shooting: two conscripts from Tajikistan opened fire, killing 11 people before being killed by returned fire. |
| 24 November 2022 | Krymsk | Krasnodar Krai | 5 | 0 | 5 | Vladimir Zhirov opened fire in a medical centre, killing two people. He then went outside and shot at passers-by on the sidewalk, shooting dead one person and wounding another before committing suicide. Two of the victims were acquaintances of the gunman. The only injured person died in the hospital on December 6, 2022. |
| 9 August 2023 | Abinsky District | Krasnodar Krai | 1 | 3 | 4 | A man was fatally shot in the head and three others wounded during a domestic conflict that escalated into a shootout. A 21-year-old man was charged with murder, and two other people were detained in connection to the case. |
| 24 September 2023 | Lyubinsky | Omsk Oblast | 4 | 0 | 4 | Dmitry Migunov shot to death his brother-in-law and his two children before killing himself. |
| 14 October 2023 | Mirny | Sakha Republic | 4 | 0 | 4 | Viktor Chernykh killed four people. |
| 27 October 2023 | Volnovakha | Donetsk People's Republic | 9 | 0 | 9 | Volnovakha massacre: Anton Sopov and Stanislav Rau shot and killed nine people. |
| 7 December 2023 | Bryansk | Bryansk Oblast | 2 | 5 | 7 | Bryansk school shooting: a teenage girl shot a female classmate dead and injured five people before shooting herself in a school. |
| 22 March 2024 | Krasnogorsk | Moscow Oblast | 151 | 609 | 759 | Crocus City Hall attack: Four terrorists linked to IS-KP killed at least 151 people and injured at least 609. An undetermined number of the deaths were caused by fire or smoke inhalation. |
| 27 March 2024 | Stavropol | Stavropol Krai | 3 | 1 | 4 | 37-year-old man shot and killed two daughters with a traumatic pistol and severely wounded his wife before killing himself. |
| 4 May 2024 | Aleksandrovka | Donetsk People's Republic | 6 | 0 | 6 | Yuri Galushko shot and killed six soldiers. |
| 23 June 2024 | Derbent & Makhachkala | Dagestan | 27 (Note: Including five perpetrators.) | 46 | 73 | 2024 Dagestan attacks: during the terrorist attacks, 17 policemen, five civilians and five attackers were killed. 46 people were injured. |
| 13 July 2024 | Agachaul | Dagestan | 1 | 3 | 4 | A 25-year-old man opened fire during a fight with an illegally owned pistol, killing one person and wounding three others, including two relatives of the deceased, after which he was arrested. |
| 18 September 2024 | Moscow | Moscow | 2 | 7 | 9 | Shooting at Wildberries office in Moscow: two people died and seven were wounded during a shootout. |
| 26 October 2024 | Basan | Zaporozhskaya oblast | 11 | 0 | 11 | Maxim Fedorchenko shot and killed eleven soldiers. |
| 29 January 2025 | Usokhi | Kaluga Oblast | 4 | 0 | 4 | Sergei Borisov shot and killed three people before committing suicide. |
| 2 March 2025 | Mytishchi | Moscow Oblast | 0 | 4 | 4 | Delivery courier, 24-year-old Daniil (or Danila, according to other sources) Potekhin, wounded 4 security guards with a traumatic pistol after conflict and was detained. Subsequent fate is unknown. |
| 6 April 2025 | Lipnaya Gorka | Leningrad Oblast | 4 | 1 | 5 | Sergei Chemrov shot and killed four people and injured one person before being arrested. |
| 25 November 2025 | Kamenka | Leningrad Oblast | 7 | 0 | 7 | Sergey Yagushev shot and killed seven soldiers. |
| 16 April 2026 | Akkermanovka | Orenburg Oblast | 1 | 3 | 4 | Sergei Basalaev opened fire on police, killing one and injuring three, and then fled the scene. On April 18, the shooter was arrested. |
| 3 August 2026 | Khmelnytskoye village | Republic of Crimea | 4 | 4 | 8 | Maxim Alistratov opened fire on fellow soldiers, killing one and injuring another. He then killed three civilians and injured three others in the village. The shooter was arrested. |

== See also ==
- List of mass shootings in the Soviet Union
- List of massacres in Russia
- List of school shootings in Russia
