= List of mass shootings in Spain =

This article is a list of mass shootings in Spain. Mass shootings are firearm-related violence with at least four casualties.

The data includes casualties of perpetrators, including self-inflicted gunshot or shooting of a perpetrator by police. The treatment of perpetrator casualties is at variance to some but not all definitions of a mass shooting used in the United States. The inclusion of injured victims in the data is also at variance with some of the US definitions that only include dead victims. However, the above treatment is consistent with that used in other Wikipedia lists of mass shootings by country.

== 21st century ==
Date	Location	Dead	Injured	Total	Description
18 May 2026	El Ejido, Andalusia	2	4	6	A 25-year-old man shot and killed ‌his two parents and injured four others, including his son.
9 November 2025	El Casar de Escalona, Castilla–La Mancha	1	3	4	One person was killed and three other people wounded in a shootout between police and drug traffickers.
2 April 2025	Málaga, Andalusia	0	4	4	A 30-year-old man fired shots in the Carretera de Cádiz district, wounding four people.
24 January 2025	Madrid, Community of Madrid	0	6	6	Six people were wounded after a brawl escalated into a shooting in the Cañada Real shantytown. Five people were arrested.
1 January 2025	Puente Genil, Andalusia	1	4 (Note: Including the perpetrator or suspect)	5	A man fired shots in the street before being reprimanded by his neighbours and leaving. He returned and opened fire again, killing a man and wounding three other people, including a teenager, before being wounded himself and arrested.
28 September 2024	Málaga, Andalusia	0	6	6	Six people were wounded in the La Trinidad neighbourhood. Four people were later detained in connection with the shooting.
18 September 2024	Madrid, Community of Madrid	0	4	4	Four young people were shot and a fifth stabbed during a brawl in Carabanchel.
23 June 2024	Girona, Catalonia	2	2	4	A man fired an assault rifle at people after a dispute, killing two people and wounding two others, including a child. He and his wife were arrested three months later.
3 June 2024	Seville, Andalusia	1	3	4	During a fight between two families, four people were shot, one of whom died in the hospital. Another man was killed and two other people injured by stab wounds.
6 May 2024	Antequera, Andalusia	0	16	16	After an argument over a dog with another family, a man fired an automatic weapon at people and barricaded himself with three family members before they were arrested. Sixteen people were injured in the incident.
26 October 2022	Argamasilla de Calatrava, Castilla–La Mancha	3	2	5	After attacking his father, a man retrieved a rifle and opened fire from his house, killing a neighbour and police officer and wounding another policeman and a Guardia Civil. Another Guardia Civil killed the shooter.
18 July 2022	Marbella, Andalusia	0	4	4	A shooter wounded four people in a discotheque before being stabbed and arrested.
14 December 2021	Tarragona, Catalonia	0	5	5	A security guard opened fire on co-workers, wounding three people, then fled and wounded a police officer before being shot by police and arrested. He was euthanized in 2022 due to his injuries.
3 December 2018	Barcelona, Catalonia	0	4	4	Four people were wounded in a shootout between Romani families in Nou Barris.
8 November 2017	Cartagena, Region of Murcia	2	2	4	Two people were killed and two others wounded in a street during a fight.
16 July 2017	Peguera, Balearic Islands	0	4	4	Four people were injured at a café after a gunman fired a long gun.
29 September 2011	Madrid, Community of Madrid	2	2	4	A mentally ill man opened fire in a church, killing a woman and wounding two other people before killing himself.
15 December 2010	Olot, Gerona	4	0	4	A man shot and killed four men over revenge and debts.
30 March 2006	Alzira, Valencian Community	4	1	5	Four men armed with guns and knives shot and killed four other men inside an apartment and wounded a woman by shooting and stabbing her.
8 January 2006	Madrid, Community of Madrid	3	1	4	A security guard killed two co-workers and wounded another outside the Palacio de Comunicaciones before killing himself.
25 April 2002	Alicante, Valencian Community	3	1	4	Three people were killed and a fourth person wounded in a shootout between Romani families.
22 March 2001	San Esteban de las Cruces, Asturias	1	3	4	A man opened fire from his residence, killing a neighbour and wounding three other people before being arrested after a standoff.
5 February 2000	Valencia, Valencian Community	5	0	5	A man caused a gas explosion before opening fire from his house, killing a neighbour, two National Police Corps officers, and a firefighter, before being killed by other police officers.

== 20th century ==
Date	Location	Dead	Injured	Total	Description
3 December 1999	Madrid, Community of Madrid	0	4	4	A gunman shot and wounded four people at a Vips restaurant before fleeing with an accomplice.
22 December 1997	Azuqueca de Henares, Castilla–La Mancha	0	4	4	A man chased his wife in the street while firing a shotgun, wounding her and two bystanders. He was arrested after being shot by police.
27 November 1996	Gamonal, San Millán de Lara, Province of Burgos, Castile and León	6	0	6	Gamonal and San Millán de Lara shootings: A man shoots and kills five members of the family of a woman he is infatuated with, including the woman before taking his own life.
9 June 1996	Herreros de Rueda, Province of León	5	1	6	A local man fired at a parade celebrating the Feast of Corpus Christi, killing three people. He then shot two Guardia Civil that responded, killing one of them, before police shot him dead.
26 August 1990	Puerto Hurraco, Benquerencia de la Serena	9	12	21	Puerto Hurraco massacre: Two brothers shot and killed nine people and injured 12 others stemming from a quarrel between two families.
26 December 1989	Badajoz, Extremadura	3	2	5	A man opened fire on people in the street, fatally shooting three children and wounding two other people.
22 April 1987	Madrid, Community of Madrid	1	4	5	A man shot and killed his wife and wounded his four children. He surrendered at a local police station.
1 July 1985	Madrid	1	27	28	Madrid airline office attacks: A terrorist attack that targeted the American Trans World Airlines, British Airways and Alia Royal Jordanian Airline offices in Madrid, Spain, killing a woman and wounding 27 people.The attacks have been attributed by several sources to the Abu Nidal Organization.
22 March 1984	near Pasaia, Basque Country	4	0	4	National Policeman ambushed five members of the Comandos Autonomos Anticapitalistas and killed 4 of them.
14 September 1982	Errenteria, Basque Autonomous Community	4	1	5	September 1982 Rentería attack: Six ETA members ambush several national police officers, four of whom are killed in the attack, with the fifth being injured.
27 November 1980	Liermo, Ribamontán al Monte, Cantabria	7	1	8	Liermo shooting: A man shoots and kills six people and wounds another following a dispute over land. He would then take his own life.
3 November 1980	Zarautz	5	5	10	1980 Zarautz attack: Six ETA members target were a group of five off-duty civil guards killing four of them and a bystander.
17 October 1980	Barcelona, Catalonia	2	4	6	A man opened fire at a courthouse, killing two people and wounding three others before being shot by police and arrested.
20 September 1980	Markina-Xemein	4	0	4	1980 Markina attack: Four ETA members target were a group of four off-duty civil guards killing all of them.
13 July 1980	Orio	4	3	7	1980 Orio ambush: ETA members target a convoy of civil guards with two civil guards being killed and three injured. Two ETA members would be killed after an exchange of gunfire.
1 February 1980	Ispaster	8	0	8	1980 Ispaster attack: ETA members target a convoy of civil guards with six civil guards being killed, while two ETA members were killed by hand grenades that they had thrown.
22 October 1978	Getxo	3	1	4	October 1978 Getxo attack: Four ETA members, armed with machine guns and shotguns ambush four civil guards, killing three and injuring the other.
24 January 1977	Madrid	5	4	9	1977 Atocha massacre: Neo-fascist extremists with links to New Force and Warriors of Christ the King assassinate five labor activists from the Communist Party of Spain (PCE) and the workers' federation Comisiones Obreras (CC.OO).
4 October 1976	San Sebastián	5	10	15	Assassination of Juan María de Araluce Villar: Three ETA members assassinate Juan María de Araluce Villar, the Government appointed President of the Provincial Deputation of Gipuzkoa and member of the Council of the Realm.Araluce's driver and three police guards are also killed, with ten bystanders also being injured.
9 May 1976	Montejurra, Navarre	2	3	5	Montejurra incidents: A neo-fascist terrorist attack that killed two Carlist members and another three seriously wounded at the annual Carlist Party celebration.
10 March 1972	Ferrol	2	16	18	2 members of the clandestine union CCOO are shot and killed by the Armed Police, with another 16 being injured by bullets.
5 January 1932	Arnedo, La Rioja	11	30	41	Arnedo events: The Civil Guard fire upon civilians when the group of workers and a delegation who were trying to attend a meeting with their employers, to negotiate the end of a strike called by the General Union of Workers.
21 May 1928	Pobla de Passanat, Catalonia	10	2	12	Pobla de Passanant massacre: A man leaves his house and shoots and murders mainly children in the street before fleeing through the mountains, where he was pursued by the Somatén and the Civil Guard.
16 February 1919	Parish of Sofán, Carballo (Galicia)	4	0	4	4 women are shot and killed by the Guardia Civil.
7 March 1916	La Unión, Murcia	7	16	23	Guardia Civil and a unit of the Spanish Army opened fire at a crowd of striking workers in La Unión, killing 7 and injuring 16.
12 October 1912	Parish of Nebra, Porto do Son (Galicia)	5	32	37	Around 300 peasants were protesting in the bridge of Cans against a new tax ordered by the mayor to solve the local deficit. The Civil Guard fired indiscriminately at the demonstrators, killing 5 people and injuring 32.
22 April 1909	Parish of Oseira, San Cristovo de Cea (Galicia)	7	0	7	The Guardia Civil shot residents who protested against the transfer of several artistic pieces of value from the local convent.
13 September 1902	Málaga	7	5	12	A Civil Guard officer shot at fellow guards at the Agujero post before leaving the post and shooting at civilians. He is shot and killed by responding police

== See also ==
- Crime in Spain
