= List of mass shootings in Bulgaria =

This article is a list of mass shootings in Bulgaria. Mass shootings are firearm-related violence with at least four casualties.

The data includes casualties of perpetrators, including self-inflicted gunshot or shooting of a perpetrator by police. The treatment of perpetrator casualties is at variance to some but not all definitions of a mass shooting used in the United States. The inclusion of injured victims in the data is also at variance with some of the US definitions that only include dead victims. However, the above treatment is consistent with that used in other Wikipedia lists of mass shootings by country.

== 21st century ==
Date	Location	Dead	Injured	Total	Description
26 August 2022	Nova Zagora, Sliven Province	2	4	6	A man shot and killed two people at a gypsy wedding, four others were injured.
31 December 2017	Novi Iskar, Sofia City Province	6	0	6	Novi Iskar shooting: A man shot and killed his ex-girlfriend before killing five of her family members.
14 March 2014	Lyaskovets, Veliko Tarnovo Province	1	3	4	A man shot and killed a Bulgarian police officer and injured three other officers in a shootout after he threatened students and the headmaster of a school in Lyaskovets.
18 March 2013	Sofia, Sofia City Province	4 (Note: Including the perpetrator or suspect)	1	5	A former Bulgarian army officer shot and killed three neighbours and injured one other before killing himself.
2 March 2013	Koynare, Pleven Province	0	4	4	Four people were shot and wounded during a fight between patrons and security guards at a discotheque.
18 January 2013	Plovdiv, Plovdiv Province	4	0	4	A man shot and killed his wife, two children and himself in Kyuchuk Paris district.
7 January 2013	Sofia, Sofia City Province	5	0	5	A man shot and killed his wife, two children, mother-in-law and himself in Gotse Delchev district.
19 September 2011	Yablanitsa, Lovech Province	3	1	4	A man angered over a property dispute killed three members of his family and wounded another.
11 July 2007	Belite Brezi, Sofia City Province	1	3	4	Three masked men opened fire towards a group of people, wounding four. One of the victims died in the hospital months later. The incident was linked to organized crime.
30 July 2004	Sofia, Sofia City Province	6	2	8	Several masked men armed with rifles opened fire in front of a restaurant, killing six people and wounding two others. The incident was linked to organized crime.
4 June 2004	Sofia, Sofia City Province	3	2	5	Two men opened fire at a mall, killing three people and wounding two others. The incident was linked to organized crime.

== 20th century ==
Date	Location	Dead	Injured	Total	Description
3 May 1996	Lyulin, Sofia City Province	3	1	4	A man armed with a rifle killed three police officers and wounded another before being arrested.
1 January 1990	Momchilgrad, Kardzhali Province	4	3	7	A border guard shot and killed four people and wounded three others.
March 1985	Sofia, Sofia City Province	4	0	4	A drunken policeman opened fire inside a restaurant, killing four people.
25 December 1974	Sofia, Sofia City Province	8 (Note: Two by stabbing)	8 (Note: Three by stabbing)	14	Sofia shooting: A student killed eight students and wounded eight others at the Sofia University.
19 December 1967	Golyamata Zvezda, Haskovo Province	6	6	12	A soldier killed at least six people and wounded at least six others before being arrested.
24 June 1939	Tirpan, Southern Bulgaria	4 (Note: Including the perpetrator or suspect)	0	4	A 15-year-old student killed three teachers with a revolver at a school after being expelled. The boy, who had already been expelled from three other schools during the year for bad behaviour, afterwards committed suicide.

== See also ==
- Crime in Bulgaria
