= Zagreb shooting =

Zagreb shooting may refer to:

- Kajzerica shooting
- 2020 St. Mark's Square shooting
- Murder of the Zec family
