= Lipovtsi =

Lipovtsi (plural) and Lipovets (singular) may refer to:

- Lipka Tatars of the Grand Duchy of Lithuania.
- Lipovans of Besarabia.
- Founders of Lypovets Raion
- Lipovtsy, a village in Primorsky Krai.
