= Daruvar shooting =

Mass shooting in Croatia

- Location: 45°35′34.71″N 17°12′55.8″E; Ivana Mažuranića 69, Daruvar, Bjelovar-Bilogora County, Croatia
- Date: 22 July 2024; 2 years ago 10:12 – 10:22 (CEST, UTC+02:00)
- Target: Staff and residents
- Attack type: Mass shooting; Mass murder; Matricide
- Weapon: Handgun (either 9mm Colt Mk IV Series 70 Government Model or revolver)
- Deaths: 6
- Injuries: 6
- Perpetrator: Krešimir Pahoki
- Motive: Post-war Trauma, Personal Problems
- Charges: Femicide (1 count); Aggravated murder (4 counts); Murder (1 count); Attempted aggravated murder (3 counts); Attempted murder (2 counts)
- Verdict: Sentenced to 50 years imprisonment

On 22 July 2024, a mass shooting occurred at a nursing home in Daruvar, Croatia. The shooter, who was identified as 51 year-old Krešimir Pahoki, the son of a resident, opened fire on residents and staff, resulting in the deaths of six individuals, including his mother, four other residents, and a staff member. Six others also sustained injuries. Pahoki was later arrested in a nearby cafe. He was later convicted and sentenced to 50 years' imprisonment.

== Background ==
The 2017 Small Arms Survey estimated that there are 13.7 privately owned guns per 100 people in Croatia, making it the 25th largest country in Europe in terms of gun ownership. Many households keep weapons that date back from the Yugoslav Wars in the 1990s.

Mass shootings in Croatia are rare. There had been only one earlier incident with such number of victims in Croatia in the 21st century: the 2019 Kajzerica shooting, during which six people were killed.

== Attack ==
At Around 10:00 AM, Pahoki visited a local café in Daruvar, bought drinks for customers, and made vague threats that he was reportedly "going to do something." before leaving and arriving to the care home

The shooting occurred when Pahoki entered the private nursing home, which had 20 residents, at around 10:10 CEST, and opened fire. He shot his mother, Anka Papp, first. He then moved through the home's rooms and hallway, targeting four other residents and a male nurse who tried to intervene. Five victims were found dead at the scene, including Pahoki's mother, who had stayed in the home for ten years following a severe stroke, and a sixth died shortly after at the Virovitica hospital.

Six others were injured, of which four sustained serious wounds. Emergency calls flooded the Daruvar police department at 10:18 AM. The first responding units arrived at the care home within minutes to find a scene described in police reports as horrific Most of the victims were in their 80s and 90s. Pahoki fled after the shooting, but was arrested by police in a nearby cafe. In total, pahoki had fired at least 14 shots

Pahoki had previously entered the cafe Daruvar before 10 am, but then left. His return to the cafe coincided with signs of panic in the street. He placed a gun on the table, alarming the staff. The more senior of the waitresses organized a safe evacuation for the other patrons and facilitated a police apprehension. Pahoki was compliant during the arrest. Witnesses noted he appeared unusually calm and giggled following the event.

== Victims ==
The names of those killed:

- Anka Papp, resident, who was Pahoki's mother.
- Bosiljka Njegomir, resident.
- Gisela Vegh, resident.
- Zdenka Leder, resident.
- Damir Fijala, staff member.
- Marija Čihak, resident, was taken to the hospital, but died from her injuries.

== Perpetrator ==
The gunman was identified as Krešimir Pahoki (born c. 1973), a retired military policeman from Donji Daruvar who received the Homeland's Gratitude Medal in 1996, and retired in June 2016. He had previously served in the Croatian War of Independence and had a prior record with police due to several incidents, including disturbance of public order and domestic abuse. Pahoki had lived across from a small neighborhood shop. Neighbors and local shopkeepers noted that he was living alone in a run down house and was routinely spending his mornings drinking alcohol outside the local storefront before the shooting. The gun he used in the attack was found to be unregistered. Croatian media reported that Pahoki had financial issues which included the payment of bills for the nursing home, neighbours of Pahoki recalled he was significantly struggling with alcoholism after retiring from the military, frequently spending days drinking outside a local shop in his hometown.

Staff members noted that his visits to his mother were infrequent and marked by tension. The attack occurred on a day Pahoki had reportedly entered the home under the premise of paying her care bills. On 20th June 2024, roughly a month before the nursing home shooting, Pahoki was involved in a violent altercation with an acquaintance. He allegedly pointed a handgun at the man's mouth and pushed him down a flight of stairs onto glass bottles. The victim required emergency abdominal surgery at a hospital in Bjelovar. Psychiatric evaluations during proceedings noted narcissistic and Dissocial personality traits, though he was deemed fully competent and aware of his actions at the time of the crime.

=== Legal proceedings ===
On 23 July, 11 criminal charges including aggravated murder, murder, attempted murder, and femicide were filed against Pahoki. In December 2024, he was indicted on 13 charges stemming from the shooting and the incident that occurred on 20 June 2024, about a month before the shooting.

Pahoki's trial began on 7 April 2025 During the trial, he refused to express remorse and stated that he did not feel guilty over the shooting. On 3 July 2025, Pahoki was individually convicted across 13 distinct counts, including multiple charges of aggravated murder, attempted murder, and femicide. The court tallied his cumulative sentences to 151 years in prison, however due to the Croatian Constitution not allowing life sentences, a final verdict was given and Pahoki was convicted by the municipal court of Bjelovar and sentenced to 50 years' imprisonment.

== Reactions ==
Croatian President Zoran Milanović expressed shock over what he called a "savage, unprecedented crime", and called for stricter gun control regulations. Croatian Prime Minister Andrej Plenković described the shooting as a "monstrous attack" and expressed condolences to the victims. The mayor of Daruvar at the time stated that the entire town was in complete shock, noting that Daruvar had never experienced violence on such a scale. A day of mourning was held in Daruvar on 24 July.

Relatives of residents and local citizens gathered outside the nursing home and emergency medical centers for candle light vigils, Local businesses also briefly closed, out of respect for the victims.

== See also ==
- List of known or suspected matricides
- List of rampage killers in Europe
