= Moscow Multifunctional Center shooting =

Mass shooting in Moscow, Russia in 2021

Moscow Multifunctional Center Shooting
- Location: 55°42′05″N 37°41′54″E; Multifunctional Center "Ryazansky", Moscow, Russia
- Date: 7 December 2021; 4 years ago
- Attack type: Mass shooting
- Weapon: ISSC M22 .22-caliber semi-automatic pistol
- Deaths: 2
- Injuries: 4
- Perpetrator: Sergei Glazov
- Motive: possibly argument with MFC employees, mental illness

On 7 December 2021, a mass shooting took place in the Moscow Multifunctional Center in Moscow, Russia. Two people were killed, and four others were injured. The perpetrator was identified as 45-year-old Sergei Glazov, who had previously served in the Federal Security Service.

== Shooting ==
The killer came into conflict with the staff at the MFC in southeastern Moscow after refusing to wear a mask. The employees, in turn, refused to provide him with MFC services. The attacker then first went up to the Zhilishchnik State Budgetary Institution with a pistol and fired at one of the employees. Then, going down from the third floor, he managed to shoot at and kill a security guard. On the way, he came across two more visitors, and he began to shoot at the man with the child. Glazov tried to flee after the alarms went off, but he was detained. In total, two people were killed, and four were injured, including a 10-year-old girl.

== Aftermath ==
Sergei Glazov was charged for murder of two or more persons, attempted murder and illegal possession of weapons. A psychiatric examination of Glazov was appointed.

The 10-year-old victim underwent surgery after the attack. The four wounded are being treated in Morozov Hospital.

The police officer who neutralized and detained the perpetrator, Georgy Domolaev, was awarded for his actions.

In June 2023 Glazov was sentenced to compulsory psychiatric treatment.
