= Mile Matić =

Yugoslav prison guard and spree killer (1956–1994)

- Born: 14 January 1956; Derventa, SR Bosnia and Herzegovina, SFR Yugoslavia
- Died: August 1994 (aged 38); Belgrade, FR Yugoslavia
- Cause of death: Suicide by hanging
- Occupation: Prison guard
- Penalty: Found not guilty by reason of insanity

Details
- Date: 26–27 February 1986
- Killed: 9
- Injured: 3
- Weapons: Valmet 7.62mm M62; Two Zastava M57 pistols; Clothes iron; Bare hands; Arson

Mile Matić (Serbian Cyrillic: Миле Матић; 14 January 1956 – August 1994) was a Yugoslavian prison guard and spree killer who murdered nine people and wounded three others in Doboj on 26 February 1986. He was found to be mentally disabled and sent to a psychiatric hospital for compulsory treatment, where he committed suicide in 1994 at the age of 38.

== Life ==
Mile Matić was born on 14 January 1956 in Derventa, SR Bosnia and Herzegovina, Yugoslavia. His father was an alcoholic. When Mile was 3 years old, his mother left the family. He lived in Doboj. His IQ was 162 and he was persistent in everything he did. He worked as a prison guard at the "Novi život" prison in Zenica, practiced karate, and quickly gained a black belt. He worked as a coach in the karate section, but was fired because he stole money from membership fees. He had a lot of girls. He was an amateur photographer. He photographed naked girls and filmed erotic scenes in which he was the main actor, but also blackmailed the girls, threatening to send photos to newspapers. Acquaintances said that he was calm, kind and a little narcissistic. He loved crime novels, Mercedes cars, and wanted young and beautiful girls.

In March 1985, Matić met Smiljana Vasiljević. At that time, her boyfriend was in the army. She was a third-grade high school student. They were seeing each other, but at the end of the school year, she ended the relationship. However, Matić did not accept it. He watched her more and more often, waited for her near the school, and arranged for her parents to marry her. Realizing that neither marriage nor love with her will work, he openly threatened the girl and her parents, and then her boyfriend. He once told her friends, "She will not live to see the eighth of March."

Matić often quarreled over the behavior of his sister's husband. He received dozens of complaints about threats and behavior at work. But no one paid attention to them and did not take them seriously.

After two months of treatment at Zenica Psychiatric Hospital, Matić was released on 16 January 1985. He was discharged as a cured patient with a diagnosis of paranoid schizophrenia. He was forbidden to come into contact with any weapons and was advised to report monthly to the Disability Commission. A similar opinion was expressed a few weeks later by a psychologist from the Sarajevo Institute of Public Health after a regular systematic examination of prison guards from Zenica. He stole these records and hid them. Even then, he had thoughts on how to get rid of people who "haunt him and who bother him."

== Shooting spree ==
On the morning of February 26, 1986, in Doboj, Matić met his sister's husband in his parents' apartment in a room he always kept locked up. They quarreled and fought. Matić hit his brother-in-law in the head with a clothes iron, wrapped him in a sheet and blanket and shot him five times with a Zastava M57 service pistol. He then got into a taxi cab and killed the taxi driver near the Vranduk tunnel, with four shots to the head, and then threw his body into the Bosna River. He removed the taxi signs from the car and went to Zenica to work at the prison. He was seen in the cafeteria with one of his colleagues, with whom he rarely talked. They agreed to go to a nearby village to pick up the girls. Then they left and Matić shot the colleague in the head near the village of Jeline. After that, he left his body in the car, and hitchhiked to Zenica.

At about 9 pm, Matić changed his clothes and took an M62 submachine gun, another M57 pistol, and 300 bullets in a large bag from the prison. He then introduced himself as a municipal official, got into a taxi cab and put a heavy bag in the trunk. He asked the driver to take him to Vinkovci immediately. When they left the city, the driver began to suspect the identity of the passenger. Because of this, the driver tried to inform the police about his passenger at the gas station. Twenty kilometers later, on the road near Žepče, two police officers stopped a cab and asked the two to show their documents. They both got out of the car and when the taxi driver opened the trunk, Matić opened fire from two pistols. He killed one police officer, wounded the other and wounded the taxi driver. Matić then fled to Žepče and tried to hide in a barn. A policeman found Matić and the owner of the barn and took them to the police station. In front of the station, Matić pulled out a pistol but dropped it, then took out another one and aimed it at the policeman. The policemen fled inside the station and raised the alarm. Matić ran to the nearby church, put on a security guard's coat, left his bag in the barn and fled to Doboj.

At 10 PM, Matić arrived at the Doboj Railway Station. There, he asked a taxi driver to take him to the village of Poljice, saying that he was going to visit a friend. The driver took his own friend with them, and they left. In Poljice, Matić did not find his friend and told the driver to take him to Koprivna Donja, because he had a girlfriend there. Around 11 PM, the driver dropped him off in this village. From there, Matić walked to the hamlet of Velika Rijeka. There he came to the house of Smiljana Vasiljević, climbed the roof of the house, went down to the attic and went down to the pantry. He went through three bedrooms, while firing the gun, killing 18-year-old Vasiljević, her grandfather, grandmother and mother. Her 19-year-old brother was able to jump out of bed and rushed to the door. Matić knocked out his teeth with the handle of his pistol, hit him in the head with a karate technique and shot him in the head with one shot. He was waiting for Vasiljević's father until dawn, but he went to a friend after work. At around 5 AM, Matić killed Vasiljević's family dog. Leaving Velika Rijeka, he set fire to the house, barn and garage.

After that, Matić went to the village of Zarječe. There, he went to one house and asked to sleep there, waiting for the bus. He was offered a meal and bed. Meanwhile, information about the killings reached Zarječe. His hosts guessed that he could be a killer, and tied him with a dog chain. He was then asked, "Do you know what you were doing?", and he replied, "I know I intended to continue."

== Aftermath ==
After his arrest, Matić was found with a list of 20 names of people he wanted to kill. Experts diagnosed him with paranoid schizophrenia. He was sentenced to compulsory treatment. He was sent to the Belgrade District Prison Hospital, where he hanged himself in August 1994.

== See also ==
- List of rampage killers in Europe
