= 2020 Bolsheorlovskoe shooting =

Mass shooting in Nizhny Novgorod, Russia

- Location: Bolsheorlovskoe, Nizhny Novgorod Oblast, Russia
- Date: 12 October 2020 c. 16:00 (MSK)
- Attack type: Mass shooting, murder–suicide
- Weapon: Two 12-gauge Hatsan Escort shotguns
- Deaths: 5 (including the perpetrator; and the perpetrator's grandmother at home)
- Injuries: 2
- Perpetrator: Daniil Mikhailovich Monakhov
- Motive: Unknown

On the evening of 12 October 2020, a mass shooting took place in Bolsheorlovskoe, a village of Bor, Nizhny Novgorod Oblast, Russia. After killing his grandmother at their home, 18-year-old Daniil Monakhov shot and killed three people and wounded two others in the neighborhood before fleeing the scene. He was found dead the following day after committing suicide by gunshot.

== Perpetrator ==
A yearbook picture of Monakhov.

Daniil Mikhailovich Monakhov, was born on the 6th of June 2002 in Nizhny Novgorod Oblast, in his early childhood he was diagnosed with an congenital heart condition, This contributed to his physical isolation as he could not participate in sports or other kinds of activities with other children.

His father Mikhail Monakhov was an hunter who frequently took Daniil shooting and spent time with him. His mother’s name is unknown to the media.

In his teenager years he had grown an interest in firearms, mass shootings, and computer games. He enjoyed regularly exploring abandoned structures and urban ruins, he joked about death and openly praised the Columbine High School massacre. At around 16-17 he mapped out an attack at his highschool cafeteria with another student he known, the teachers and school psychologist had grown concerned and reported these signs to the Federal Security Service (FSB)no serious intervention took place.

An mutual of Daniil said;

"I even noticed it when I talked to him at school. He was planning a terrorist attack back in ninth grade. The teachers at school were told about it, and the FSB came running, but they did nothing, they just put him on a watch list."

Monakhov obtained the shotgun used in the shooting legally on September 17th 2020, an almost month before the murders, the other gun had belonged to his father. He took it from the family home without permission, people have suspicion that he bought the medical certificate to do so from a private clinic. Rosgvardia had inspected his home on 17 August and attested to no violations of the firearms storage code.

== Shooting ==
Monakhov's first victim was his 63-year-old grandmother Galina Monakhova, whom he shot point blank after she tried to stop her grandson with two guns and 40 cartridges, mortally wounding her. Monakhov then shot Sergei Napylov in the back as he went out to check what the noise was, killing him instantly. Monakhov then began firing at the windows of the residential building; no one in the building was injured. The attacker then walked towards a bus stop, where he wounded Valentina Zhogonova, and opened fire on a bus with people parked there; no one on the bus was injured.

Monakhov continued down the street past houses, shooting in all directions, until he entered the courtyard, where he wounded Viktor Artyukhin and killed both Nikolai Seleznev and Andrei Tikhomirov. The shooter later fled into the woods near the dachas, where shots were heard at approximately 04:50.

A manhunt for Monakhov was started, initially going by witness statements of a man in his 40s carrying a single shotgun before his actual identity was confirmed. At 07:12 the attacker was found dead 200 meters from the crime scene by Rosgvardia soldiers.

All three of the initially wounded, two women and a man, including Monakhov's grandmother, were first treated at Bor Central Hospital before being brought to N.A. Semashko Regional Hospital for surgery. The women had life-threatening and critical injuries from multiple gunshots to the abdomen, remaining in intensive care, while the man was treated for a gunshot to the legs. Galina Monakhova died a month later on 12 November.

It is believed that Daniil allegedly had initially planned to commit a school shooting, but his grandmother thwarted the plan.

== See also ==
- List of mass shootings in Russia
- Mass shooting
- Columbine High School massacre
- Kerch Polytechnic College massacre
- Radicalization
