= Yaroslavsky shooting =

2002 mass murder in Russia

- Location: Yaroslavsky, Primorsky Krai, Russia
- Date: 25 August 2002; 24 years ago 01:00 (VLAT)
- Attack type: Mass murder, murder-suicide
- Weapon: Vepr Carbine
- Deaths: 6 (including the perpetrator)
- Injuries: 10
- Perpetrator: Sergey Semidovskiy

The Yaroslavsky shooting was a mass murder that occurred in Yaroslavsky, Primorsky Krai, Russia on 25 August 2002, when 40-year-old police captain Sergey Semidovskiy (Russian: Сергей Семидовский) killed five people and wounded ten others in and outside a bar with a Vepr carbine, after an argument with several customers. The drunk gunman then shot himself in the chest and was taken to a hospital in Khorol, where he tried again to commit suicide and eventually died of cardiac arrest on 27 August.

As a consequence of the shooting Colonel Lebedev, head of the Khorolsky District department of internal affairs, as well as Lieutenant-Colonel Kurgeyev, head of the personnel and training department, and Lieutenant-Colonel Kotyshev, head of public security police, were dismissed, and disciplinary measures were taken against several other members of the local police.

== Victims ==
- Dmitry Velichko (30 years old)
- Vladimir Nikanchuk (25 years old)
- Alexander Filimonov (18 years old)
- Maxim Valeev (18 years old)
- Alexander Kuznetsov (Александр Кузнецов), 28, died on 27 August

Twelve people sustained severe injuries, seven of whom had to be airlifted by helicopter to Vladivostok for emergency surgery. Another ten or so visitors received minor wounds from ricochets.
