= Agachaul =

Agachaul Агачаул Агач-аул
- Selo
- Location within Republic of Dagestan Location within Russia
- Coordinates: 42°55′N 47°27′E
- Country: Russia
- Region: Republic of Dagestan
- District: Karabudakhkentsky District
- Time zone: UTC+3:00

Agachaul (Russian: Агачаул; Kumyk: Агач-аул, Agaç-aul) is a rural locality (a selo) in Karabudakhkentsky District, Republic of Dagestan, Russia. The population was 1,811 as of 2010. There are 22 streets.

== Nationalities ==
Kumyks live there.

== Geography ==
Agachaul is located 39 km northwest of Karabudakhkent (the district's administrative centre) by road. Novy Kyakhulay and Talgi are the nearest rural localities.
