= Marinko Magda =

Serbian mass murderer

Magda Marinko
- Born: October 30, 1963 (age 62); Subotica, SR Serbia, SFR Yugoslavia
- Citizenship: Serbia
- Criminal charges: Killing three people
- Criminal penalty: Life sentence

Marinko Magda (born November 30, 1963) is a Serbian hitman / mass murderer who killed 13 people in Serbia and Hungary.

== Murders in Serbia ==
In 1994 he killed five people in the town of Subotica: Milan Petrić, Stana Petrić, Dane Petrić, Josip Agatić and Verica Agatić.

== Murders in Hungary ==
On January 13, 1994, in Szeged, Hungary, the 42-year-old Bálint Z. Nagy (a local confectioner), his 42-year-old wife, and their 16- and 10-year-old children were shot dead in their apartment. On January 28, 1994, the Hungarian police arrested Magda as the main suspect of murder of the Z. Nagy family. An investigation revealed that the same weapon which was used to kill the Z. Nagy family, a Škorpion vz. 61 submachine gun, was used to kill a Hungarian couple, Antal Horváth and his wife, as well as Dragutin Kujundžić (a Croatian), on December 20, 1993, in Kecskemét, Hungary. He is also suspected to have strangled another victim, Edit Némethné Márton, in Orosháza on January 5, 1994.

Magda received a life sentence for killing three people in 1995. Given that before 1998, all life sentences were, at minimum, 25–30 years' imprisonment, he was expected to remain behind bars until at least the year 2020, unless he dies beforehand.

In 2005 he was fined 40,000 HUF for having attacked a prison guard 18 months before. If he fails to pay this fine his imprisonment will be extended by 200 days.
