= Gamonal and San Millán de Lara shootings =

- Location: Gamonal, San Millán de Lara, Province of Burgos, Castile and León, Spain
- Date: November 27, 1996
- Weapon: Hunting rifle
- Deaths: 6
- Perpetrator: Juan Medina Gordillo

The Gamonal and San Millán de Lara shootings occurred on November 27, 1996, in Gamonal, San Millán de Lara, Province of Burgos, Castile and León, Spain. Juan Medina Gordillo shot and killed six people.

== Events ==
On November 27, 1996, at approximately 4:00 PM, Juan Medina Gordillo used a shotgun to shoot María del Carmen Delgado Juez and her two brothers in an apartment at 177 Vitoria Street. He then went to San Millán de Lara to shoot the mother of the first three victims, his own mother-in-law and an unidentified friend at his front door. Gordillo then went to the mountains in search of his son-in-law. After failing to find him, Gordillo went back to San Millán de Lara where he fatally shot himself in the heart.

== Perpetrator ==
Juan Medina Gordillo, 53, had a history of harassing María del Carmen Delgado Juez, 23. On April 8, 1995, she lodged a complaint with the police over threats and harassment. Gordillo had previously threatened Juez and her boyfriend. He was detained and released soon after; he had no police record and claimed he had threatened Juez and her boyfriend with a toy gun.
