= 2012 Moscow shooting =

Mass shooting in Moscow, Russia in 2012

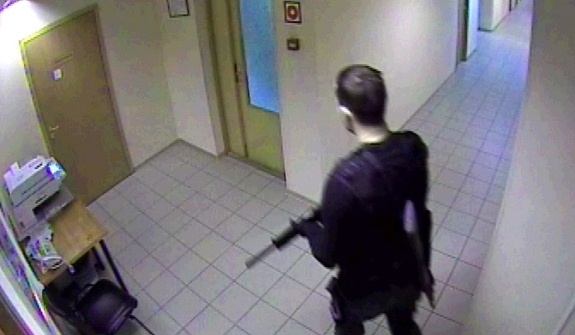
- CCTV still of Vinogradov during the shooting

- Moscow (European Russia) Location of Moscow in Russia
- Location: 55.8874°N 37.6391°E; Warehouse office of the Rigla pharmaceutical company (part of the Protek Group), Chermyanskaya street, Severnoye Medvedkovo District, Moscow, Russia
- Date: 7 November 2012; 14 years ago c. 10:00 a.m.
- Attack type: Mass shooting, mass murder, workplace shooting
- Weapons: 12 gauge Vepr-12 semi-automatic shotgun; 12 gauge Benelli M3 Super 90 semi-automatic shotgun (unused)
- Deaths: 6
- Injuries: 1
- Perpetrator: Dmitry Vinogradov
- Defender: Yury Marchenko
- Motive: Unrequited love, misanthropy
- Convictions: Murder of two or more persons

On 7 November 2012, a mass shooting occurred in which six people were killed and one person injured at a warehouse in northeast Moscow, Russia. The perpetrator, 29-year-old Dmitry Vinogradov, was sentenced to life imprisonment.

== Shooting ==
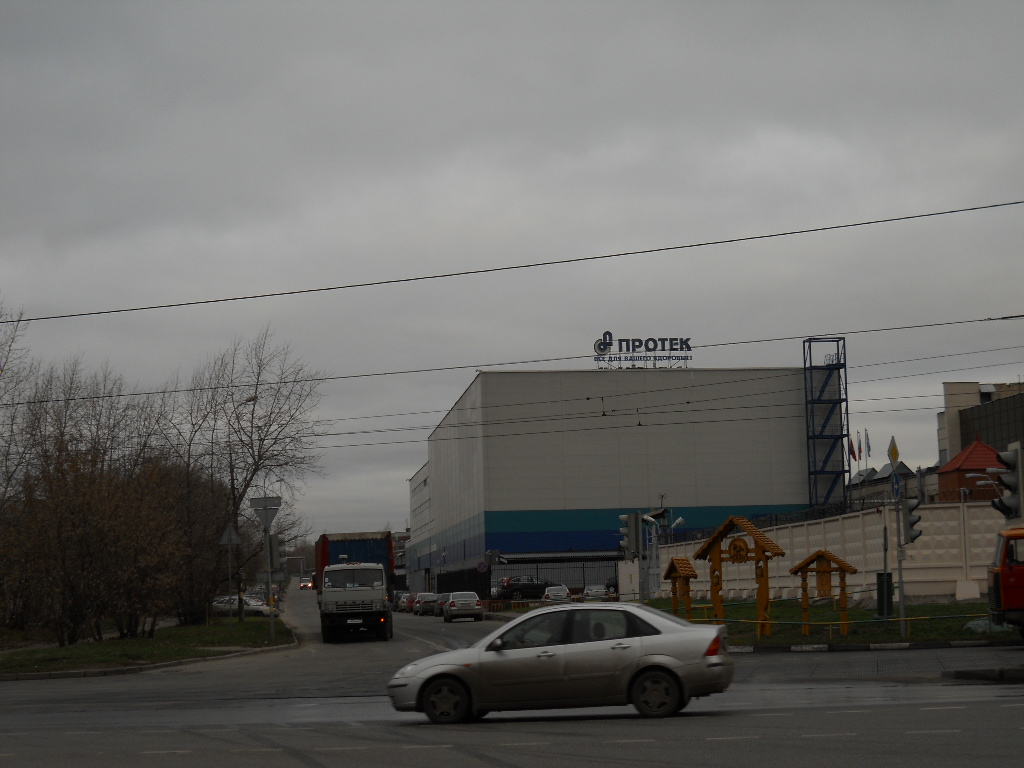
The office of the Protek group of companies on Chermyanskaya street, where the shooting took place

Five people were killed in a shooting spree in northeast Moscow in Russia. Hours before the shooting, Dmitry Vinogradov posted a manifesto on Vkontakte expressing his hatred towards mankind and comparing humans to cancer. The gunman entered the warehouse on Chermanskaya Street at around 10:00 a.m. on Wednesday, 7 November 2012, dressed in camouflage gear and armed with two 12 gauge semiautomatic shotguns, a Vepr-12 and a Benelli M3 Super 90.

He shot dead three men and two women, injuring two others, a male and female, at their desks before giving himself up to security guards. One of the injured died during the night while in intensive care, having suffered from critical gunshot wounds. Vinogradov's girlfriend was said to be safe. The shooting ended when Vinogradov was subdued by a colleague, Yury Marchenko, after one of his guns ran out of ammunition, which saved lives, and he was then detained by Rigla's guards. After he was arrested, he shouted "kill me!" at the guards.

== Perpetrator ==
Police arrested 29-year-old Dmitry Andreyevich Vinogradov (born on 20 August 1983), (Russian: Дмитрий Андреевич Виноградов) lawyer at the Rigla pharmaceutical company that owned the warehouse. He was reported to have gone on a five-day drinking binge after being jilted by a co-worker. On 8 November, Vinogradov apologized in court and pleaded that he had "no other choice". He also said that he had wanted to kill himself after the massacre, but was prevented from doing so.

An investigator said that Vinogradov had been planning the shooting spree since January. He took lessons at a gun range to improve his shooting. Vinogradov stated he believed killing as many people as possible was the only way to make the world better. Vinogradov was captured on security cameras moments before the shooting began.

Vinogradov stated his biggest regret was that he had failed to kill enough "genetic trash" (a term he used in his manifesto to refer to his targets). During pre-trial investigation, he confessed and apologized for his actions to the relatives of the victims.

It was determined he was sane, though he had an unbalanced mental state and had depression. He had previously been prescribed antidepressants. Vinogradov was sentenced to life imprisonment on 9 September 2013 and was ordered to pay 300000 ₽ ($9422.96) to victims' families for damages. He also had to undergo compulsory therapy. In 2014, Vinogradov was placed in the White Swan maximum-security prison.

== See also ==
- List of mass shootings in Russia
