= 1998 Sakhalin military base shooting =

Mass shooting in Sakhalin, Russia

- Location: Pobedino, Sakhalin Oblast, Russia
- Date: 26 January 1998; 28 years ago c. 21:30 (MAGT)
- Attack type: Mass shooting, axe attack
- Weapons: Kalashnikov rifle Axe
- Deaths: 7
- Injuries: 1
- Perpetrator: Oleg Naumov
- Motive: Resentment over low social standing
- Convictions: Murder with aggravating circumstances

On 26 January 1998, a mass shooting took place at a military outpost in Pobedino, Sakhalin Oblast, Russia. Seven people were killed and another was injured before the perpetrator, 20-year-old private Oleg Naumov, was caught after attempting to flee the area.

Following a three-year investigation, Naumov was tried for murder and bodily harm. He was sentenced to life imprisonment in 2001.

== Attack ==
The attack occurred at an ammunition warehouse in Smirnykhovsky District, three kilometres away from Roshchino and guarded by a rifle company that included Oleg Naumov.

At 9:30 p.m., 30 minutes into the night guard shift, Naumov struck his sentry partner in the head with an axe, severely wounding him. Naumov, armed with an automatic rifle, then shot dead another soldier on guard duty and his guard duty chief, before shooting eight more soldiers in the base cafeteria and in a restroom, killing five of them. The victims were from Sakhalin, Primorsky Krai, and Khabarovsk Krai. Three other soldiers were able to escape through a window. Naumov fled the warehouse after stealing his superior's Makarov pistol.

The Sakhalin garrison of the Eastern Military District was informed of the shooting at around 10 p.m. A commission, led by the head of the regional Department of Internal Affairs, Major General Nikolai Alekseitsev, and the head of the army corps of the affected unit Lieutenant General Ivan Babichev, ordered roads to be blocked and activity at seaports and the only airport, Yuzhno-Sakhalinsk Airport, to cease.

Naumov was caught a few hours later at 5:00 a.m. on 27 January. Police found him hiding in a barn outside of Pobedino, still carrying the rifle and three magazines. He was arrested without incident and brought to another military outpost in Yuzhno-Sakhalinsk.

== Perpetrator ==
Oleg Naumov (Russian: Олег Наумов) was serving as a private in the Russian Ground Forces. He had signed up for enlistment in February 1995, with noted recommendations due to his good performance at youth workers' school and as an orderly for an ambulance clinic. Naumov entered military service Sverdlovsk in December 1996, shortly after his 18th birthday. Besides a visual impairment, he was judged fit for duty and initially served with the FSB Border Service of Russia for a year before being transferred to the unit in Sakhalin in late December 1997. He had been at the outpost for less than two months. Naumov had a criminal record and a history of drug abuse from as early as the age of 13, which was unknown to his commanders at the time.

== Legal process ==
Naumov was hospitalized where he was put under heavy sedation. During his interrogation about the crimes at the base, Naumov claimed that he had been high on acetone vapors, and did not recollect committing the killings. There were initially suspicion that Naumov had acted out of mental distress due to being conscripted and subjected to hazing in the military. However, Naumov had in fact enlisted and made no mention of a hazing event. Naumov instead admitted to planning the shooting over conflict with his unit because they refused to share his belief that he was their "leader".

In May 2001, Naumov was sentenced by the Far Eastern Military District Court to life imprisonment in a penal colony. He appealled the verdict, after which the Military Collegium of the Supreme Court of Russia denied the appeal and affirmed the sentence in January 2002.

== Aftermath ==
The Pobedino military unit was disbanded as a result of the shooting. As several residents were employed by the military outpost, unemployment became widespread, also causing the inner town to become more densely populated due to the influx of jobseekers.
