= Sofia shooting =

1974 university shooting in Sofia, Bulgaria

- Location: 42°38′49″N 23°20′39″E; Sofia University, Sofia, Bulgaria
- Date: 25 December 1974; 20:45 – 23:00
- Attack type: Mass shooting, stabbing, school shooting
- Weapons: .380-caliber Walther PP pistol; Finnish knife
- Deaths: 8 (6 by gunfire, 2 by stabbing)
- Injuries: 8 (5 by gunfire, 2 by stabbing, 1 by gunfire and stabbing)
- Perpetrator: Branimir Donchev Delchev
- Verdict: Deemed mentally unfit to stand trial, sentenced to indefinite rehabilitation in a mental hospital

The Sofia shooting was a mass shooting that occurred on 25 December 1974, at block No.1 of Studentski Grad (Bulgarian: Студентски град) in Sofia, Bulgaria. On the evening of that day, the perpetrator, 17-year-old Branimir Donchev, entered the building carrying a firearm and a knife and murdered six people, as well as injuring a further ten. Two of the wounded later died of their injuries. To this day, the attack remains the deadliest mass shooting in Bulgarian history.

== Background ==
On the night of 25 December 1974, 17-year-old Sofia University student Branimir Donchev—along with two friends, Valerie and Bozhidar—watched The Godfather at a cinema in Sofia. Some accounts claim that the film's violence and tension had a profound impact on Branimir and influenced the rampage that followed.

After the movie, Branimir and Valerie departed from Bozhidar and returned home, where he found his twin-brother, Delyan, and his cousin-in-law, Tsvetelina, whom had been adopted by his aunt and was not biologically related to him. She was a first-year chemistry student at Sofia University and originally from the countryside. According to a diary later recovered by police, Branimir was in love with her, but she had previously rejected his advances.

An argument soon sparked between Branimir and his brother, which escalated into a fight. The reason was possibly due to Jealousy over Tsvetelina. Branimir overpowered his brother due to his greater strength, with the fight only endling when Tsvetelina broke up the two before leaving the home in tears. She returned to her residence at Dormitory Building No.1 of Studentski Grad, designed for students at Sofia University. Following the fight, Branimir took his father's .380 Walther PP pistol, several seven-round magazines, and a Finnish knife. Armed with these, he left home and headed toward the dormitory. He also apparently played with the gun at a friend's home, possibly that of Valerie's.

Witnesses later reported that he behaved erratically on the way — switching buses and trams, changing his route repeatedly, and at times running. He arrived at Dormitory Building No.1 shortly before 20:00. Branimir later claimed he believed that his cousin-in-law was meeting with “enemies of our people’s government” there, which infuriated him further.

== Shooting ==
Casualties

Dead:

- Stefan Stanchev (21; shot in Room 519)
- Wu Nong Swan (22; shot in Room 519)
- Boris Neychev (20; shot in Room 519)
- Valerie Petrov (23; stabbed in the hallway)
- Le Van Shang (25; shot in Room 408)
- Elena Drumeva (shot in Room 315)
- Stoyan Stoyanov (22; shot in Room 315)
- Stoyan Petrov Agov (30; stabbed in the hallway)

Injured:

- Juan Thai Lan (21; shot in Room 519)
- Vladimir Krastev (22; shot in the hallway)
- Emilia Doicheva (18; stabbed in the hallway)
- Luis Eduardo Haramillo (23; shot in the hallway)
- Svetlana Krastanova (20; shot in Room 106)
- Atanas Nachev (23; stabbed in the hallway)
- Raycho Donchev (23; stabbed in the hallway)
- Ismet Ademov (22; stabbed and shot in the hallway)

Branimir arrived at his cousin's residence at Room 410, but found she was not present. Some sources claim that he encountered an unidentified man in the room and left quickly, whilst others state that Branimir entered the room and fired multiple shots at nothing in particular. The shooting began when Branimir forced his way into Room 519, where three people were celebrating the birthday of a Vietnamese exchange student. The exchange student was one Branimir reportedly disliked. Upon entering the room, Branimir opened fire, with one person being killed instantly and two others being wounded; one of the survivors later died in hospital on December 28.

After leaving the room, Branimir began shooting at people in the hallways of the dormitory. Several victims were both shot and stabbed. Once the hallways were empty, he proceeded to knock on doors and fire into rooms. In one of these rooms, he encountered a young couple expecting a child, both of whom he killed.

Following this, two students—Imet North and Stoyan Agov—attempted to overpower him. During the struggle, Branimir seriously injured both men, with Agov later dying in hospital. He was eventually subdued by student Atanas Nachev while shouting that he was a “special agent” on a secret mission and falsely claiming a second shooter was inside the building. Nachev restrained him inside a nearby room until police arrived.

The Bulgarian Communist Party and the Committee for State Security later suppressed information about the incident to avoid seeming weak, and to conceal the slow police response, possibly due to the nation never seeing such a death toll in similar attacks before. In total, six people died at the scene, two more succumbed to their injuries in hospital, and eight others were wounded. Among the victims, one of those killed and three of the injured were foreign nationals.

== Perpetrator ==
Branimir Donchev Delchev (Bulgarian: Бранимир Дончев Делчев) was born on 4 October 1957, along with his twin brother Delyan Delchev. The two came from a wealthy family, with his father Doncho Delchev working as the Deputy General Director of DSO "Stara Planina". Because of the nature of his job, he travelled abroad a lot and spent very little time with children. His mother was said to be cyclophrenic or schizophrenic. She would commit suicide in the attic of the family's home in 1971, three years before the shooting occurred. Branimir also had an older sister, Totka. He was mentally unstable and was diagnosed with multiple mental illnesses, which he is said to have inherited from his mother.

== Aftermath ==
Immediately after the arrest, the house where Branimir lived was searched by police. His father was arrested and sentenced to 4 years in prison for negligent possession of a weapon. After serving his sentence, he was released and had to pay a large fine. His brother and sister were examined by psychiatrists and his brother was diagnosed with an unknown mental illness. Branimir's brother spent a lot of time in and out of mental institutions. He often had periods of mental breakdowns and the authorities were afraid that he would go down his brother's path. In 1988 he died by suicide by jumping off a balcony inside a mental hospital.

Branimir himself underwent five forensic examinations. He was said to have a severe case of schizophrenic psychosis, and was thus found unfit to stand trial by reason of insanity. He was prescribed compulsory psychiatric treatment and allocated to a psychiatric hospital in Lovech. On 7 February 1975, Branimir Donchev was supposed to be taken to the psychiatric hospital. He was being escorted by two officers in a police car. The officers made a stop in the town of Pravets as Branimir complained that he had to use the restroom. In reality, Branimir tried to escape and was fatally shot by the officers. He was later secretly buried in an unnamed grave in Botevgrad. Following the shooting, the Godfather's screening in Bulgaria was severely limited, and scenes deemed "too obscene" were censored.

== See also ==
- List of mass shootings in Bulgaria
