= Kajzerica shooting =

Civilian attack in Croatia in 2019

- Location of the shooting
- Location: Cimermanova Street 2, Kajzerica, Zagreb, Croatia
- Date: August 1, 2019; 7 years ago 9:10 PM – 9:30 PM (CET)
- Target: Home occupants
- Attack type: Mass shooting; murder–suicide; Pedicide; Mass murder; Familicide
- Weapon: CZ 99 semi-automatic handgun
- Deaths: 7 (including the perpetrator)
- Perpetrator: Igor Nađ
- Motive: Romantic troubles

On 1st August 2019, a mass shooting occurred in the Kajzerica neighbourhood in Zagreb, Croatia. The perpetrator, 35 year-old former taxi driver Igor Nađ killed six people in his former girlfriend’s house, including a 10 year-old As first responders declared a manhunt to find Nađ, he fled the scene before being found 15 minutes later, deceased.

== Background ==
Kajzerica is a neighbourhood located in southern Zagreb with a population of roughly 4,387 residents as of 2011. Eyewitness interviews with Kajzerica residents described the neighborhood as quiet and "a type of neighbourhood where everybody knows everybody".

The most recent mass shooting in Croatia prior to the Kajzerica shooting, was the Podvinje cafe shooting which took place in April 1998, where a former soldier killed 7 others and seriously injured 2 in a Cafe bar before committing suicide by blowing up his car.

== Shooting ==
The shooting took place on August 1, 2019. At the beginning of that day at 9:30 AM, Nađ went to a bar in Vrbik, where he had been a regular and drank Pelinkovac. At 10:00, he arrived at his hairdresser in Vrbik, where he had been going to cut his haircut for multiple years prior to the shooting. Witnesses stated he was in a relatively good mood. At 10:30 following the haircut, he went to a nearby cafe. Before leaving the cafe, he had been quoted as telling a friend, “This will be the last time you see me.” The timeline between when Nađ said he will not be seen again and the shooting is mostly inconclusive, investigation timelines indicate Nađ used this time to retrieve the unregistered firearm and confirm who was at the house.

At 9:10 PM, Nađ drove his white Škoda Octavia taxi to Cimermanova Street 2 in the Kajzerica district, parking close to the Tojagić family house, he was reported to have had both his arms to his sides in an attempt to conceal his weapon. At 9:15, he encountered Maja's 10-year-old son Paulo playing in the yard, Nađ sent him inside to check which family members were sitting in the home. Nađ reportedly gave Paulo a hug, While standing near a bush holding the boy, Nađ exchanged words with the immediate neighbor, Mehmed. Mehmed greeted Nađ, and Nađ calmly responded with "Good Night", standing completely still without walking away. Mehmed stepped inside his apartment seconds before the shooting started.

At 9:21,Nađ pushed through the door into the entryway. Maja's parents, Dragomir and Filjka, were right near the entrance corridor. Nađ shot both in rapid succession, killing them in the hallway. He then advanced further into the home where Maja, her sister Josipa, and Josipa's boyfriend Davor were gathered. He shot all three at close range, Neighbours reported hearing a rapid succession of gunshots followed by screams and Maja pleading "Dont, dont dont", Igor is rumoured to have periodically shot from his handgun in the house before reloading unassumingly. Maja was shot and killed inside near the bedroom area where their 2-month-old infant was lying in his crib unharmed. After murdering the occupants, Nađ turned the weapon on the 10 year-old boy and killed him as well. A next-door neighbour Štef told 24sata that stray bullets struck his own front door during the gunfire. A nearby witness who rushed outside right after the gunfire stopped reported seeing Maja and her son lying in pools of blood next to eachother through the open entranceway.

At 21:30, Nađ drove his white Škoda Octavia onto a remote dirt path in Brezovica, roughly 50 meters away from an abandoned building near the Caritas facility, a home for ch. Tactical units located the empty, idling Škoda first, Before establishing a perimeter and tracking Nađ into the surrounding dense brush using thermal imaging and cell signals. When special forces closed in on his position and issued him to surrender, Nađ placed the pistol to his right temple and pulled the trigger. Police later confirmed he fired a bullet straight through both temples, he was found dead with his fingers still locked around the grip of the 9mm pistol.

== Victims ==
Six people died during the attack. All victims were linked to Maja Tojagić: Maja's father Dragomir Tojagić (61), Maja's mother Filjka Tojagić (63), Maja's sister Josipa Tojagić (29) and her boyfriend Davor Paušak (29); and Maja Tojagić (35) together with her son Paulo Zamboni (10). Forensic teams later discovered that all bullet wounds hit a vital area (chest or the head)

Only Maja's two month old baby was spared, He was initially placed at the Home for Children in Nazorova Street in Zagreb, where medical evaluations confirmed he was physically uninjured and well cared for. Nađ’s mother stated that she would care for her grandson following the tragedy. Meanwhile, social services processed the case to evaluate suitable family placement and long-term care or adoption options.

== Perpetrator ==
Igor Nađ (August 31, 1983 - August 1 2019) was born in Vukovar. Immediately after his birth, he moved to Petrovci. After the start of the Croatian War of Independence in 1991, his family fled to Zagreb, where they were accommodated at the International Hotel. His father remained on the battlefront, fighting in Bosnia and Maslenica. Following the war, his mother eventually ended up in Brezovica, while his father lived in Petrovci, Later in life despite living separately, Nađ regularly visited his mother in Brezovica and traveled by train to Petrovci to help his father with work, Nađ and his brother chose to remain in Zagreb rather than return to the countryside, Igor's brother eventually returned to Petrovci around 2008 before later emigrating to Ireland, leaving Nađ behind in Zagreb.

He attended elementary school in the Vrbik district, he was reported to have been constantly getting into fights with other students, even outside his school he would reportedly get into constant clashes in local nightclubs, which culminated into his friends saying he was constantly "on the edge of the law". There are no records of him pursuing high school studies or any further higher education. People who knew Nađ in Zagreb offered varying reports of his personality.

Acquaintances from local cafés in neighborhoods like Vrbik described him as quiet and reserved about his personal life, while close friends characterized him as generous and willing to help others despite noting that he struggled financially to cover rent and other basic living expenses. In his final years, he worked various jobs, including several years as a lifeguard at Lake Jarun, working summer tourism seasons on the dalmatian coast, as a bartender, and eventually started working long term as an Uber taxi driver. On July 16th, 2016 near a bar in Trešnjevka, Nađ had assaulted a man and was fined 500 kunas for it.

According to accounts from Maja's former coworkers and acquaintances, Igor began visiting the salon specifically to book massages with her. Maja had many suitors, but Igor persistently returned to the salon for appointments until she eventually agreed to go out with him. Nađ had dated Maja Tojagić for three years before the shooting, At the time, she was already divorced and raising her young son, Paulo, from her previous marriage. Shortly after the birth of their son in May 2019, Igor and Maja broke up. Maja's co-workers recounted after the shooting that she had mentioned Nađ's intense jealousy regarding Maja. While noting he was generally polite to the family, she described him as extremely possessive toward Maja.

== Aftermath ==
Croatian President Kolinda Grabar-Kitarović stated she was "appalled by the tragedy," strongly condemned solving personal conflicts through violence and revenge, and called on all state institutions to ensure comprehensive care for the surviving infant. Andrej Plenković likewise stated on behalf of the remainder of the government that they were shocked.

Milan Bandić, former mayor of Zagreb stated that the capital was "shrouded in black" in light of the incident. In the days that followed, citizens left candles and flowers outside the house where the shooting occoured, which remained sealed off with police tape for an extended period.

Following the shooting, the Zagreb Police Administration confirmed that the handgun recovered beside Nađ's body in Brezovica was possessed illegally. In the days immediately after the tragedy, SOA declared an investigation into tracing where Nađ had bought the weapon from, however no suspect or prosecution regarding the sale of the firearm was ever revealed to the public.

== See Also ==
- Zrinski Topolovac shooting - deadly shooting over romantic struggles that occoured shortly after Croatia's independence.
- List of rampage killers in Europe
- 2024 Daruvar shooting - shooting 5 years later with similar death toll
- Covina massacre - another similar massacre where a jealous man opens fire on his former girlfriend's family home
