= Sochi bombings =

- Location: Sochi, Krasnodar Krai, Russia
- Date: April 3, 2008 — February 20, 2009
- Attack type: Bombings
- Deaths: 8
- Injuries: 46
- Perpetrators: Ilya Galkin and Mikhail Denisenko

The Sochi bombings were a series of explosions that occurred in the city of Sochi, Krasnodar Krai, Russia, between 2008 and 2009. The explosions were carried out by Ilya Galkin and Mikhail Denisenko. Their motive was hatred of society.

== Bombings ==
In the period from April 3, 2008, to February 20, 2009, there were 9 explosions in which 8 were killed and 46 people were injured.

April 3, 2008 - in the Kirov Park, Lazarevskoye Microdistrict, an explosive disguised as a cigarette case that was lying on a bench exploded. Two people were injured.

April 7, 2008 - in the square on Victory Street, Lazarevskoye Microdistrict, an explosive disguised as a bag exploded. A policeman was seriously injured from the explosion.

June 11, 2008 - on Victory Street in the Lazarevskoye Microdistrict, explosives disguised as a flask exploded. One man died

July 2, 2008 - in the Adlersky City District an explosion in a multi-storey building. As a result of the explosion, the house was partially collapsed. 2 people died and 20 were injured.

July 30, 2008 - an object exploded in the hands of a man in the Adlersky City District. One person died and one was injured.

August 7, 2008 - An explosion occurred on the beach at Loo Microdistrict. 2 people died and 20 were injured.

November 10, 2008 - in the Adlersky City District, an explosive disguised as a can of beer exploded. One person was injured.

December 29, 2008 - An explosion occurred on a street in Adlersky City District. One man died.

February 20, 2009 - an explosion occurred in a construction trailer in the Khostinsky City District. One person died and one was injured.

== Investigation ==
After the explosion on June 11, 2008, all the explosions were combined in one series. The laying of explosives on November 10, 2008, hit the surveillance cameras. But due to the poor quality of the video, the only thing that could be determined was the model of the car. It was GAZ 31105. At that time, there were 800 such cars in Sochi. All owners of these cars were summoned for interrogations. Among them was Mikhail Denisenko. Ilya Galkin knew that they were looking for Denisenko's car and organized an explosion on February 20, 2009, so that the police wouldn't search for Denisenko. Galkin found the mobile number of the owner of the same car as in Denisenko and phoned him. He also sent him an SMS with the text "How to connect this?" He disguised the explosives as a flashlight, put the parts for the explosives in a bag, took a bottle of beer, food and put it all near the gatehouse at the construction site. Then one worker died and another was injured. Police found Galkin through a SIM card. After Galkin became a suspect, it was decided to pick up his laptop from him. The boss noticed how Galkin plays games on the laptop in time and took it from him. Galkin panicked. The laptop had a lot of information about explosives. It was April 14, 2009. That evening he told everything to his mother with whom he lived. They collected all the materials for the explosives and took them to the wasteland. During this, the police watched him. Mikhail Denisenko was detained on April 14, 2009. Ilya Galkin was detained on April 15, 2009.

== Perpetrators ==
The organizer and inspirer of the explosions was Galkin. Galkin and Denisenko were neighbors and were friends since childhood. At school, they were bullied. Denisenko was very dependent on Galkin. They were prone to cruelty. They found instructions for making explosives on the Internet. Both were united by hatred of society.

Ilya Ilyich Galkin was born in 1983. He had a mother Nadezhda Galkina, father Ilya Deshko and a brother-in-law on his father Alexander Deshko. After school, he studied at a police school. After which he worked in the Sochi police. The first time Galkin made explosives in February 2008. At the time of his arrest, he was a lieutenant. In one of the interviews, Galkin's father said that he was attacked by the homeless in his childhood, and was nearly strangled once. In the winter of 2003, he beat and shot three times with a pneumatic pistol at a homeless man. The poor man survived but ceased to see. All this was during working hours and his partner saw it. Between April 12 and 17, 2007, he killed 5 homeless people and his brother and severely wounded one. For murders, he used a signal pistol redone for firing hunting cartridges. He killed his victims with a shot in the face. He searched for victims in the district of heating mains. Knife wounds were found on the bodies of the homeless. The bodies of the homeless were discovered on April 17. On the evening of April 17, he had a drink with his brother and accidentally talked about the killings of the homeless. After that, he decided to kill him. He hit him on the head with an ax and dismembered the body.

Mikhail Sergeyevich Denisenko was born in 1984. He had a wife, Inna Denisenko. Previously, he divorced his other wife due to the fact that Galkin did not like her. He worked as an operator on the local television channel Efkate. He worked there for 7 years. He was fond of electronics and technology. He made electric detonators for bombs.

== Legal proceedings ==
The trial of Galkin and Doroshenko began on June 18, 2010.

On May 17, 2011, a video of interrogation and torture with Ilya Galkin appeared on the Internet.

January 31, 2014, Ilya Galkin was sentenced to life imprisonment and Mikhail Denisenko to 21 years and 6 months in prison. They are also required to pay 54.3 million rubles in civil claims. They are also obligated to pay the city administration of Sochi 43.7 million rubles.

On October 23, 2014, the Supreme Court upheld the verdict.

On April 4, 2015, Galkin applied to the European Court of Human Rights.

== Links ==
ментовские пытки в сочи - video interrogation of Ilya Galkin.

Policeman who blew up people in Sochi spoke up in prison
