= Girerd family murders =

1965 mass murder in Isère, France

- Location: Charvieu-Chavagneux, Isère, France
- Date: 20 May 1965
- Weapons: Knife; Hunting rifle
- Deaths: 11 (including the perpetrator)
- Perpetrator: Roger Girerd

On 20 May 1965, 34-year-old Roger Girerd killed ten members of his family at their farm in Charvieu-Chavagneux, Isère, France, before committing suicide by gunshot.

At the time of the crime, the Girerd family murders were reported to be one of the deadliest mass murders by a single person in French history at that time.

== Murders ==
The murders took place during the night of 19 to 20 May, inside the residential area and outer grounds of the Girerd family farm. In the kitchen on the ground floor, Roger Girerd killed his wife Jeanette, five of their six children, aged seven months to ten years, and his one-year-old niece. The bodies of his wife and the older children were covered with a sheet, while the murdered infant was left in his pram. The sixth Girerd child, four-year-old Yves, was killed in his bed on the first floor. All had died from stabbing or strangulation.

Outside, near a shed, Girerd shot his mother and his brother, while they were laying out milk crates for sale. Both had been shot in the back. A witness had heard two gunshots at approximately 8:30 a.m. coming from near the farm. At 10 a.m., two final gunshots were heard, when Girerd killed his dog and himself.

As the farm was located outside the main settlement, the murders were not immediately noticed. At 13:00, a relative, who worked as a grocer in the village, came to the farm to deliver a pair of shoes. After knocking on the front door with no response, the relative peered through a window and saw a large sheet covering most of the kitchen floor. Upon gaining entry, she lifted the sheet and discovered the bodies of Roger Girerd's immediate family. Responding police found the other three victims and the dead perpetrator during a search of the property.

=== Victims ===
- Jeannette Girerd, 34, Roger Girerd's wife
- Eliane Girerd, 10, his daughter
- Joceline Girerd, 8, his daughter
- Bernard Girerd, 7, his son
- Yves Girerd, 4, his son
- Daniel Girerd, 2, his son
- Pierre Girerd, 6 months, his son
- Sylviane Gonnet, 16 months, his niece
- Angèle Girerd, 58, his mother
- Robert Girerd, 23, his younger brother

== Perpetrator ==

Roger Girerd lived on the farm property with his extended family. In addition to farm work, he was employed at the Gindre-Duchavany foundry in Pont-de-Chéruy for eight-hour shifts. Two months before the murders, Girerd had reportedly taken on more work at the farm after his father was hospitalised for nervous depression. Due to being overworked he had been in a mental institution in Grenoble for a few months in 1959. In the months prior to the murders, he showed signs of fatigue and uttered fears of a coming nuclear war amidst the Cold War, being especially worried about the fate of his children.

In a suicide note, Girerd stated that he was "sick of living in poverty and watching his family in need", writing " I have enough. I have to do something. I don't want my children to have to live the way I have to. I want everyone to live in peace. I am leaving money for the funeral and to pay my debts."
