= Veshkayma =

Veshkayma (Russian: Вешкайма) is the name of several inhabited localities under the administrative jurisdiction of Veshkaymsky Settlement Okrug in Veshkaymsky District of Ulyanovsk Oblast, Russia.

Urban localities

- Veshkayma (urban locality), a work settlement

Rural localities

- Veshkayma (rural locality), a selo
