= Novi Iskar shooting =

2017 crime in Bulgaria

- Location: Novi Iskar, Sofia City Province, Bulgaria
- Date: 31 December 2017
- Weapon: .22-calibre Beretta semi-automatic pistol
- Deaths: 6
- Perpetrator: Rosen Angelov

The Novi Iskar shooting was a multiple homicide that claimed the lives of six people. It occurred in Novi Iskar, Bulgaria, on 31 December 2017.

== Attack ==
On 31 December 2017, the family of Katya "Kathy" Kyukhova was preparing to celebrate New Year's Eve at 5 Lozyansky Dol Street in Novi Iskar. At 19:30, Katie Kyukhova went for a walk with her dog. The exact time of her death is unknown, but both Kyukhova and her dog were murdered on this walk by Rosen Zhelev Angelov. At about 22:00, Kathy's relatives began to worry about her absence. At about 23:00, Angelov arrived at Kyukhova's home with her body. There he killed 5 of her family members by shooting them with a handgun. He tracked through the blood of the victims and left traces which he then unsuccessfully tried to erase. After that, Angelov drove off in Kyukhova's jeep with her body. He threw the body into a nearby well and cleaned the fingerprints from the car before abandoning it. A pistol with a silencer was used during the killings - her neighbors did not hear any noise. On 2 January, Katya Kyukhova's brother called the police - he tried for hours to contact his relatives, but none of them answered. Police arrived at the house and found the five bodies. On 3 January, Angelov was declared as wanted for the murders. His home was searched in the village of Lukovo and a computer with child pornography was found in the house. He moved to an abandoned villa near his home. On 4 January, he shot and killed himself with a pistol. A tablet and a phone were found near him, from which he viewed more child pornography. His body was found on 7 January.

== Perpetrator ==
Rosen Zhelev Angelov (Росен Желев Ангелов) was born on 24 April 1964 in the village of Dropla. He had an older brother and a younger sister. He graduated from high school and worked as a taxi driver in Sofia for more than 10 years. Rosen was arrested for vandalism in the late 1970s. In 1981, he became a soldier. After serving in the military, he organized a gang with three other former soldiers. From May to October 1983, they looted more than 40 homes. They were arrested and sentenced in 1984 to two and a half years in prison. In 1994, he was convicted of a crime related to faulty currency trading. In 1997, he was sentenced to seven years for rape. He was released early in 2002, having served only five years. In 2005, he was detained on another rape accusation, but was found not guilty and thus acquitted of all charges. In 2007, as a taxi driver, he was involved in a car accident where he crashed into a tram. Rosen's car and tram burned down. He was sentenced in absentia to probation and a fine of more than 4,000 leva. In 2007, he was detained for having sex with a 12-year-old. In 2009, he was sentenced to eight years in prison. He served six out of the eight years. His acquaintances called him "Forester". He lived in isolation. He had no documents, no permanent job, no permanent housing. Acquaintances describe him as cunning and clever. He was fond of weapons. Parts of grenades were found in his house. At the end of 2016, he signed a contract with a mobile operator. He was active on Facebook.

He met Katya Kyukhova and they began to date. She worked as a cleaner for upper-class houses in Sofia. Rosen insisted that she give him the keys to the houses and access to the alarm so that he could rob them. Katya did not want to give him access and then realized that he was dating her for selfish reasons. They parted a few days before the shooting. He killed the woman's family so that there were no witnesses.

== Summons to the prosecutor's office ==
Kathy's brother filed a lawsuit against the prosecutor's office over the deaths of Kathy and his mother. The reason for the lawsuit was that Rosen should have been in prison at the time of the shooting. His eight-year sentence took effect on 22 December 2009, and he was to be in prison until 4 January 2018. Prosecutors were to pay Kathy's brother 50,000 levs for her death and another 30,000 levs for the death of his mother. Kathy's niece's lawsuit was dismissed.
