= Liermo shooting =

Spree shooting in the Spanish town of Liermo

- Location: Liermo, Ribamontán al Monte, Cantabria, Spain
- Date: November 27, 1980
- Attack type: Spree shooting
- Weapon: Shotgun
- Deaths: 7
- Injuries: 1
- Perpetrator: Ángel Campo Solana
- Motive: Dispute over land

The Liermo shooting occurred November 27, 1980, when Ángel Campo Solana killed 7 people and wounded 1 in Liermo, Spain.

== Shooting ==
On the evening of November 27, 1980, in Liermo, Ángel Campo Solana left his home with a shotgun, ammunition, and a yellow raincoat. He walked to the main street of Liermo, greeted one of the neighbours, and shot him. Solana then went to the house of the chairman of the district council, shooting him and his brother. The chairman's daughter and grandchildren fled the scene. He then shot the wife of the district council chairman in a meadow near the house as she tried to run.

He went to look for another neighbour, finding only the neighbour's wife at home. Solana asked her where her husband was, later finding the husband and shooting him in front of his wife. Then he went to look for another neighbour. He found them and their brother and shot them both. He also shot a woman and wounded her in the neck and face. After this, he went to the cemetery in Langre where he climbed into an excavated grave and shot himself in the jaw. After the shooting, he was the subject of a manhunt by the Civil Guard. Residents of Liermo and surrounding villages sheletered indoors, believing Solana was still at large. His body was found on November 30. An autopsy found that he had shot himself on the night of November 28. His watch stopped at 2:30.

== Perpetrator ==
Solana, 64, lived in Liermo with his wife and children. He moved to Liermo a few years before the shooting. The municipality and the district council decided to build a playground on the land used by Solana. The land did not belong to anyone; however, Solana used this area for livestock and general storage. After the decision to build a playground was made, members of the district council and the Civil Guard demanded that the site be cleared. Solana refused to clean it because he considered it his own. The investigation found that Solana's main targets were three members of the district council. Their relatives were accompanying victims. His later victims were members of the Veci family, motivated by previous arguments. He shot them last. Due to the fact that the victims' houses were located far from each other, and that it was common to see hunters with shotguns near Liermo, no one could understand what was happening. Solana was also a hunter and was often seen with a shotgun. His family wanted to buy the grave in which he shot himself, but could not, and he was buried in a nearby grave.
