= Lipovtsy =

Urban locality in Oktyabrsky District, Primorsky Krai, Russia

Coordinates: 44°12′00″N 131°43′00″E

Lipovtsy (Russian: Липовцы) is an urban locality (an urban-type settlement) in Oktyabrsky District, Primorsky Krai, Russia. Population: 6,402 (2010 census); 6,742 (2002 census);
