= Yaroslavsky, Primorsky Krai =

Coordinates: 44°10′32″N 132°12′54″E

Yaroslavsky (Russian: Яросла́вский) is an urban locality (an urban-type settlement) in Khorolsky District of Primorsky Krai, Russia, located 30 kilometers (19 mi) southeast of the district's administrative center of Khorol. Population: 9,104 (2010 census); 10,254 (2002 census); 11,715 (1989 Soviet census).

== History ==
It was founded in 1951 and was granted urban-type settlement status in 1957.

== Economy ==
Yaroslavsky Ore Mining and Processing Enterprise is the backbone of the settlement's industry and economy. There is also a rural construction enterprise.
