= San Millán de Lara =

Coordinates: 42°08′N 3°21′W

- Municipality and town
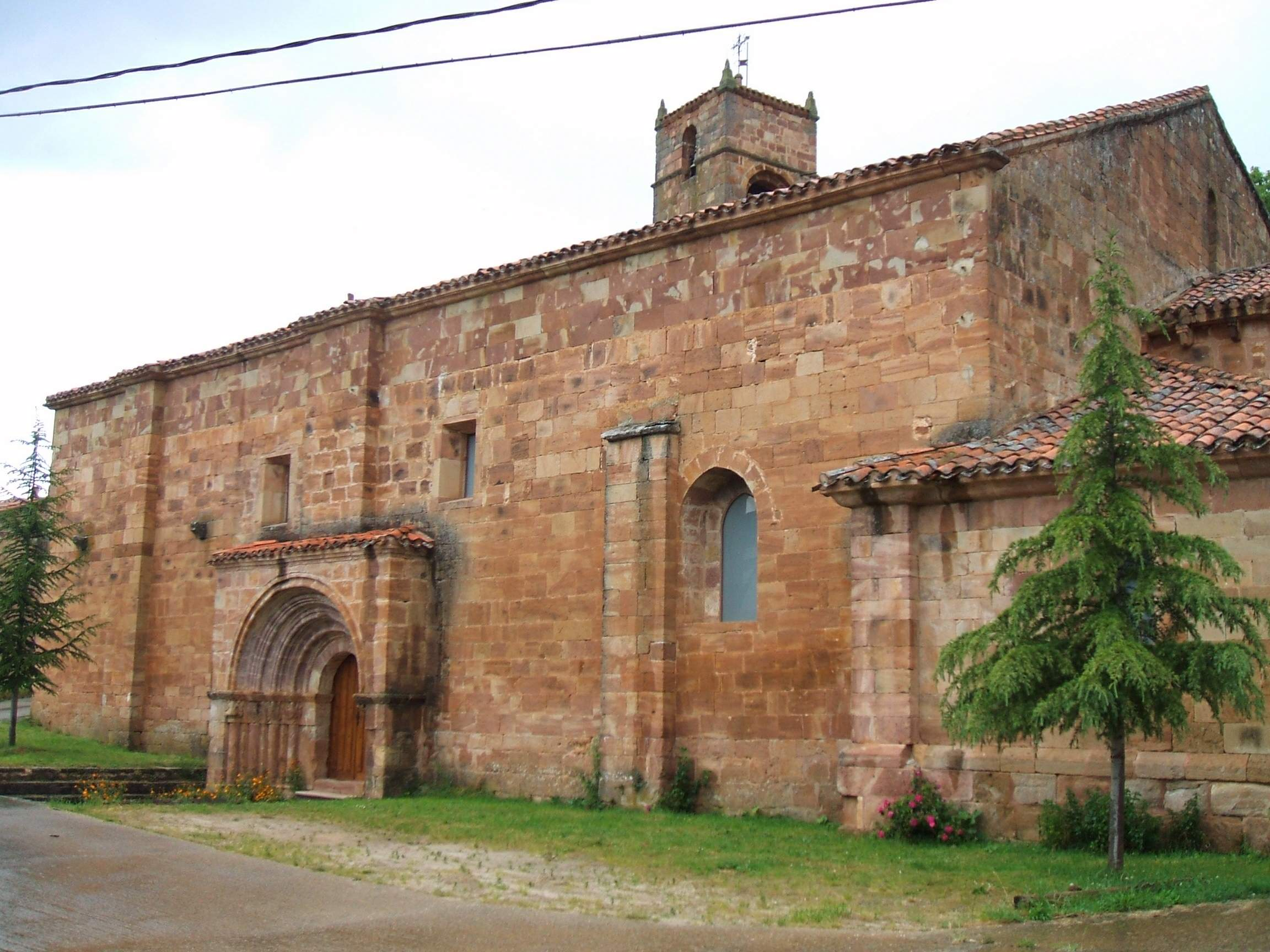
- Church of San Millán in San Millán de Lara
- Interactive map of San Millán de Lara
- Country: Spain
- Autonomous community: Castile and León
- Province: Burgos
- Comarca: Sierra de la Demanda

Government

Area
  - Total: 33.62 km^{2} (12.98 sq mi)
- Elevation: 1,068 m (3,504 ft)

Population (2025-01-01)
  - Total: 61
  - Density: 1.8/km^{2} (4.7/sq mi)
- Time zone: UTC+1 (CET)
  - Summer (DST): UTC+2 (CEST)
- Postal code: 09640
- Website: http://www.sanmillandelara.es/

San Millán de Lara is a municipality and town located in the province of Burgos, Castile and León, Spain. According to the 2022 census (INE), the municipality had a population of 65 inhabitants.
