= Kamyshin school massacre =

1997 school shooting in Russia

- Date: 9 March 1997; 29 years ago
- Attack type: School shooting, mass shooting, mass-murder
- Weapon: Automatic rifle
- Deaths: 6
- Injuries: 2
- Perpetrator: Sergei Lepnev

On the night of 8–9 March 1997, a mass murder took place at the Kamyshin Higher Military Command and Engineering Construction School. Six cadets were killed and two others were wounded in the shooting.

== Events ==
On the night of 8–9 March, a squad of first-year cadets took up guard duty at the academy. Around 7:00 a.m., 18-year-old cadet Sergei Lepnev entered the guardhouse carrying an assault rifle. When platoon commander Captain Gennady A. Ivanov asked him what had happened, Lepnev opened fire on the people inside. As a result, Ivanov, Junior Sergeant A. V. Payushenko, and four cadets were killed, while two others sustained multiple injuries. When Lepnev approached to "finish off" one of the wounded cadets—Pavel Grigoriev—his magazine ran out of ammunition. After that, Lepnev and another cadet, Sergei Arefiev, who had been watching the shooting, took two assault rifles and 180 rounds of ammunition from the guardhouse and fled into the forest.

At around 5 p.m. that same day, police officers determined that the criminals were hiding in one of the city's houses. Following negotiations in which Lepnev's mother also participated, the criminals surrendered.

== Investigation ==
The North Caucasus Military District Prosecutor's Office has opened a criminal investigation into the shooting. The military prosecutor of the Kamyshin garrison stated that the crime was premeditated. Specifically, a diagram of the guardhouse and the suspect's diary were found, containing an entry in which he expressed dissatisfaction with the "highly demanding nature of the platoon commander." A letter was also discovered that Lepnev had sent to his girlfriend a few days before the incident, in which he admitted to planning the shooting.

Initially, investigators suspected that Lepnev was mentally ill. After his arrest, he was transferred to the "Serbsky Center Psychiatry," where he underwent various tests and psychological and psychiatric evaluations over a period of time. Yuri Antonyan, a specialist in forensic psychiatry who had previously worked with many individuals convicted of serial and mass murders, spent a long time interviewing the killer. Antonyan later described Lepnev as follows.

I had a very interesting case. A young man (he was about 20 or 21—I don’t remember exactly) was studying at a military academy in a city in the Volga region. And there he killed his platoon commander—who, by the way, had treated him very well—and five cadets; he shot them with an automatic rifle. He was a true necrophile. As he told me, he wrote stories about death and sent them... where do you think? To *Pioneer Truth*. Naturally, they didn’t publish him there. When his grandfather died and they brought the coffin, he seized the moment and lay down inside it. They searched for him for a long time but couldn’t find him. When they opened the coffin to, naturally, lay the deceased inside, they saw him there and were astonished. The crime itself is interesting. First, he shot the commander. The cadets who were nearby got scared and ran away. And then he killed them too. I asked him during the examination at the Serbsky Center: “Why did you kill them?”—“But they were moving!” Meaning, movement is life. He killed them because they were alive.

=== Court ===
The North Caucasus Military District Court sentenced Arefiev to 3.5 years in prison and Lepnev to death, a sentence commuted to 25 years in a maximum-security prison due to the moratorium. While serving his sentence at the "White Swan" penal colony, in March 2021 he attempted to be released on parole. He was released on 7 March 2022.

== Perpetrator ==
From an early age, Sergei Lepnev had a fascination with death. Over the course of his life, he attempted suicide five times, the first when he was 12 or 13. As a teenager, he was fascinated by books on magic and practiced witchcraft. He wrote works of fantasy, some of which were published. After finishing 10th grade, he enrolled in a vocational school, where he studied well and was well-regarded by the administration. Six months before the shooting, he wrote in an essay that he wanted to do something that would make him famous.

He got married while in prison, and he has a child.

== See also ==
=== Some other school shooting incidents in Russia ===
- 2026 Anapa college shooting
- Bryansk school shooting
- Izhevsk school shooting
- Veshkayma kindergarten shooting
- Krasnoyarsk kindergarten shooting
- Perm State University shooting
- Kazan school shooting
- Blagoveshchensk college shooting
- 2018 Kerch Polytechnic College bombing and shooting
- 2018 Barabinsk college shooting
- 2014 Moscow school shooting
- Beslan school hostage crisis

=== Also ===
- Columbine effect
- List of attacks related to post-secondary schools
- List of mass shootings in Russia
- List of school attacks in Russia
- List of school massacres by death toll
