= Kazan school shooting =

2021 school shooting in Russia

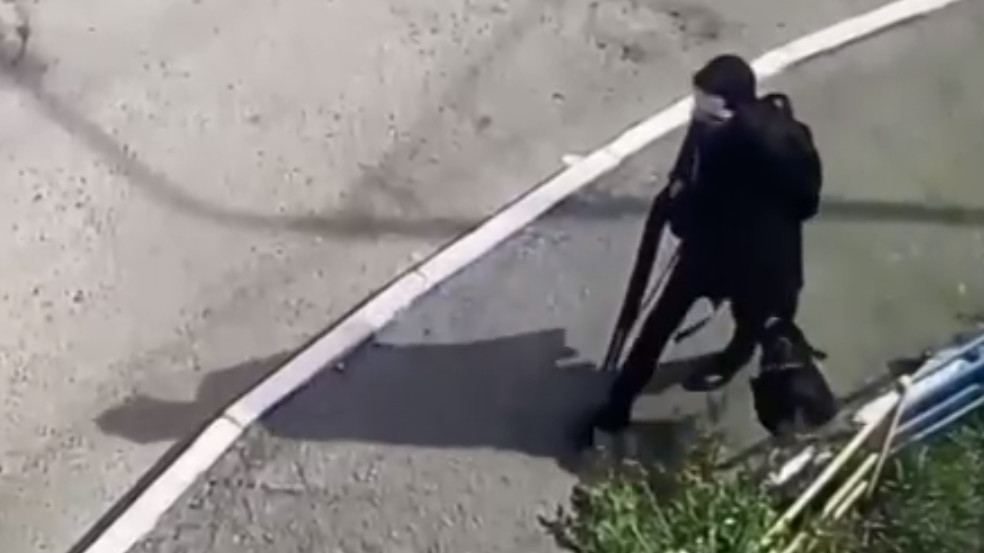
- Ilnaz Galyaviev heads to gymnasium with his shotgun, bomb and ammunition. Morning of May 11, 2021.
- Location: 55°47′35″N 49°13′29″E; Jaudata Faizi Street, 8, Kazan, Tatarstan, Russia
- Date: 11 May 2021; 5 years ago 9:24 – 9:32 a.m. (MSK)
- Target: Gymnasium
- Attack type: Mass shooting, mass murder, school shooting, school bombing
- Weapons: Hatsan Escort PS Guard semi-automatic shotgun (12-gauge); Improvised explosive device; Knife (unused)
- Deaths: 9
- Injuries: 23 (including at least 8 students and 3 adults with gunshot wounds)
- Perpetrator: Ilnaz Galyaviev
- Motive: Grandiose delusions; Desire to copy the actions of members of "destructive subcultures and communities" (officially)
- Verdict: Pleaded guilty
- Convictions: Murder of two or more persons, committed in a generally dangerous way, with a rowdy motive; Attempted murder; The illegal manufacture of explosives, illegal manufacture, modification or repair of explosive devices; The illegal acquisition, transfer, sale, storage, transportation, or carrying of explosives or explosive devices; Intentional damage to property
- Sentence: Life imprisonment

On 11 May 2021, a school shooting and a school bombing occurred in Kazan, Tatarstan, in the western part of Russia. Seven 8th-grade students and two teachers were murdered, all by gunfire, and 23 others were injured. The perpetrator was identified as 19-year-old Ilnaz Galyaviev, a former student. He pleaded guilty to the murder of two or more people on the next day and was sentenced to life imprisonment in April 2023.

== Events ==
The mass shooting occurred at Gymnasium N°175, a school in Kazan, Tatarstan, Russia, which had 714 students and 70 employees present at the time. Before the shooting, Ilnaz Galyaviev had visited the school unarmed to find out the class schedule and was chased away by the school psychologist. At 9:24 a.m. MSK (6:24 UTC), Galyaviev was stopped at the main entrance by a security system requiring a card. Galyaviev opened fire when the school worker attempted to stop him from entering. The wounded worker managed to press a panic button at 9:25, triggering an alarm in the school and alerting law enforcement. The alarm alerted teachers in the building, allowing them to lock down their classrooms. A radio communication was also sent out in the building, calling for teachers to close their classrooms.

Next, Galyaviev moved to different classrooms, which were closed due to the radio announcement, and shot at people in the halls, killing a teacher. Galyaviev then set off an improvised explosive device near the first-floor English-language room before moving to the second floor, reloading his weapon in a toilet and killing another teacher at her classroom. After that, from the window of this classroom, he shot twice at students on the playground, wounding five. Galyaviev then moved to the third floor, going into classroom 310 and killing seven students. About 30 shots were fired during the shooting. Galyaviev then moved to different classrooms on the third floor, all of which were locked. Galyaviev, now having run out of ammunition, attempted to leave the school, just as law enforcement arrived at 9:33. The school was evacuated within twenty minutes.

Video footage inside and outside the school was posted to social media; it appeared to show students using classroom windows to escape, school corridors littered with personal belongings, and a man detained by police.

Firefighters rescued 23 people on the third floor of the school.

== Victims ==
Nine people were killed during the shooting: seven were eighth-grade students and two were teachers. One student of the gymnasium committed suicide in the aftermath of the shooting.
Gymnasium staff:

- Venera Aizatova (55 years old), primary school teacher (ground floor);
- Elvira Ignatyeva (26 years old), English teacher (second floor);

Students, all on the third floor in one classroom:

- Amir Shaikhutdinov (14 years old);
- Alisa Garifullina (15 years old);
- Damir Gainutdinov (14 years old);
- Amir Volkov (15 years old);
- Zulfiya Galimzyanova (15 years old);
- Amir Zaripov (14 years old);
- Ilziya Nagimullina (14 years old).

The injured were 20 students ranging from 7 to 15 years old and three adults. At least seven wounded students were hospitalized with gunshot wounds. A Ministry of Emergency Situations Ilyushin Il-76 transported nine injured, including five students, from Kazan to Zhukovsky. After landing, the injured were transferred in ambulances to Moscow. One student was put on an artificial ventilator after surgery.

== Perpetrator ==
Ilnaz Rinatovich Galyaviev (Tatar: Илназ Галәвиев; Russian: Ильназ Ринатович Галявиев; born 11 September 2001), a 19-year-old resident of Kazan, was detained. Galyaviev graduated from Gymnasium No. 175 in 2017 and enrolled at College of TISBI, a management academy in Kazan, majoring in «Information Technology», from which he was expelled in April 2021 after failing to show up for an exam. He had no previous criminal record. The Investigative Committee reported that Galyaviev had repeatedly sought medical help for severe headaches, and in 2020 he was diagnosed with encephalopathy, indicating a brain disease. The rector of the educational institution described Galyaviev as a neat student who never missed classes. The head of his study group said that he was withdrawn and unsociable, but at the same time helped his peers with their studies, and once suggested that one of them join a certain "sect", but this suggestion was taken as a joke. Relatives had also noticed an increase in Galyaviev's aggressive behavior. However, while in court the day after the murders, Galyaviev denied having any serious illnesses.

In the spring of 2021, all of Galyaviev's relatives who had been living with him moved out. From then on, Galyaviev lived alone in the apartment; around the same time, he began preparing for the attack: in February, he took a six-hour course on safe handling of weapons, obtained the necessary medical certificates, applied for a hunting license, and on April 14, he received a gun license. On April 16, in Yoshkar-Ola, he purchased a Hatsan Escort PS Guard eight-shot (7+1) semi-automatic shotgun and 350 rounds of ammunition for it (in total, while preparing for the crime, Galyaviev purchased 600 rounds of ammunition of various brands, of which 490 were loaded with 8.5 mm diameter buckshot and 15 with slugs).

Following bomb recipes downloaded from the internet, Galyaviev purchased components for an explosive device and manufactured a homemade explosive device called "Ammonal" in his apartment. He placed the detonator and explosive substance in a 5-liter plastic bottle, to which he attached nuts with adhesive tape as striking elements. Ammonium nitrate, scales, nails, and other components were found in his apartment during a search. He made two bombs, leaving one in his apartment and bringing the second to the school. According to his own testimony, Galyaviev obtained the money to purchase the ammunition by selling in-game items to other players in the online game Counter-Strike: Global Offensive.

On May 5, Galyaviev intended to test the shotgun in a suburban forest near the village of Voronovka (approximately 18 km south of Kazan), but after arriving at the location with the weapon in a Yandex.Taxi, he changed his mind, believing that passing cars might suspect shooting. The very next day, May 6, 2021, Galyaviev planned to carry out the attack, but because of a public holiday a non-working day was declared by President Vladimir Putin, which closed the school until 11 May. On the morning of the shooting, Galyaviev posted a photo on Telegram of himself in a face mask with the word "GOD" in Russian written on it, captioned, "Today I will kill a huge amount of biowaste and shoot myself".

While in custody, Galyaviev said he planted a bomb at his registered address. However, during a search of the location, no explosives were found, and evidence was taken.

== Legal proceedings ==
On 12 May, Galyaviev pleaded guilty to the murder of two or more persons (Criminal Code of Russia, Article 105, Part 2), which carries a sentence of life imprisonment.

A month after arrest, Galyaviev was taken to Moscow, and he was assigned a forensic psychiatric examination at the Scientific Center for Social and Forensic Psychiatry V. P. Serbian. On 21 July, mass media reported that he was diagnosed with paranoid schizophrenia and declared insane, but the Investigative Committee of Russia refuted this information. Examination lasted 1,5 months. According to the lawyer of the accused Vladimir Bogdan, as of 16 November 2021, after the second psychological and psychiatric examination in Saint Petersburg, which lasted one day, Galyaviev was found to have committed the crime in a state of sanity and diagnosed with schizoid personality disorders. Chairman of the RF IC Alexander Bastrykin explained the result of the first examination by stating that "the fact of the influence of the ideas of the Columbine subcultural trend on Galyaviev was not taken into account". A wider group of experts was involved in the re-examination, to which the investigation presented additional materials — the conclusions of psychiatrists that Galyaviev's motivation was reduced to imitating the actions of other followers of this trend.

On 9 December 2021, the suspect was finally charged under four articles of the Criminal Code of the Russian Federation, namely the murder of two or more persons committed in a generally dangerous way, with a rowdy motive, attempted murder, the manufacture and storage of an explosive device, and intentional damage to property.

On 9 November 2022, the trial of Ilnaz Galyaviyev began.

=== Verdict ===
On 10 April 2023, Galyaviev was given the last word that he did not consider himself a god, and also said that he would write a book and pay off claims against the relatives of the dead. The verdict was delivered on 13 April 2023 at 10:00 Moscow time. By a court decision, Ilnaz Galyaviev was sentenced to life imprisonment in a special regime colony.

On September 15, 2023, was delivered to a Penal Colony No. 6 in the Orenburg Oblast, better known unofficially as "Black Dolphin".

In January 2025, bailiffs began collecting 23 million rubles from Galyaviev to settle the claims of the victims.

=== Afterwords ===
It became known from the court materials that Galyaviev expected that his improvised explosive device would completely destroy the school. It also emerged that he had tested his homemade bomb four times in various locations in the two months before the attack.

== Aftermath ==
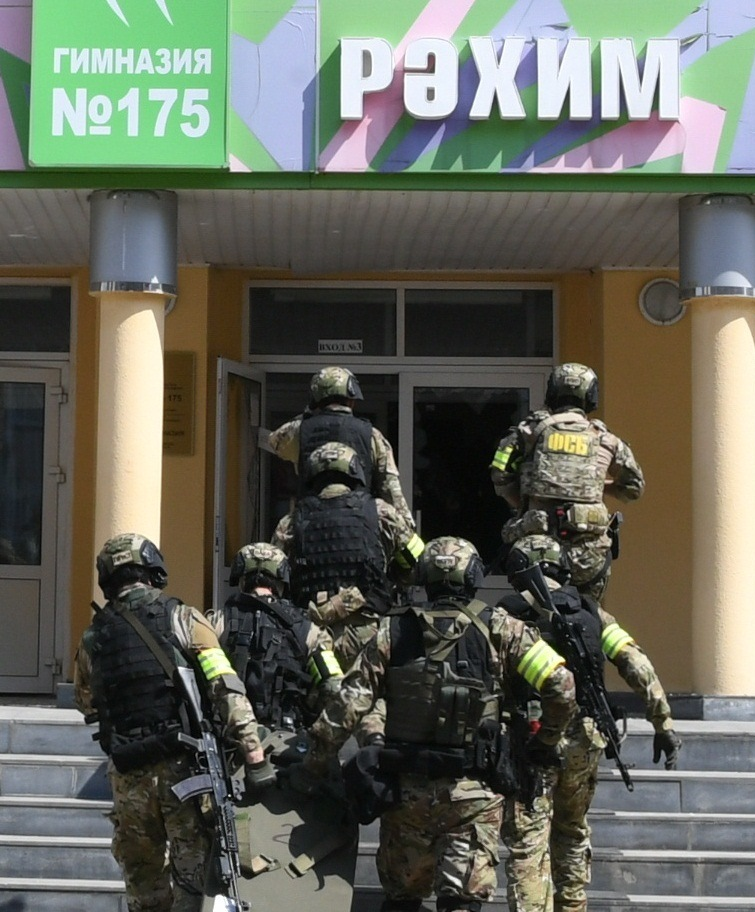
Members of the Russian Federal Security Service entering gymnasium N°175 after the shooting

All second-shift classes in Kazan were cancelled, and the entrances to Kazan schools were restricted. Several schools in Moscow were searched with dogs, although nothing was found. All students who attend Gymnasium N°175 are planned to return to school on 17 May in neighboring schools while the school undergoes repairs. After their arrival at the school, a counter-terrorism operation (CTO) regime was established. It was later removed at 15:47. In addition, 12 May was declared a day of mourning. Cultural and entertainment events were cancelled for 11 and 12 May.

Tatarstan authorities sent a payment of 1 million rubles (US$11734) to each family of the deceased. Six victims with major bodily harm have received 400 thousand rubles (US$4694) each, with plans to send payments of between 200 and 400 thousand rubles to more families of the injured. In addition, the Russian Red Cross Society raised 62,777,390 rubles (US$736642) for the victims of the shooting.

=== Gun control proposals ===
President Vladimir Putin expressed condolences to the relatives of the victims and ordered the government to tighten the country's gun laws. Vasily Piskaryov, chairman of the State Duma Committee on Security and Anti-Corruption, said a draft bill for tougher restrictions on obtaining a gun license would be considered on 12 May by a working group and that the bill could be considered in the first reading by the State Duma on 18 May. The bill, which was submitted to the State Duma in December 2020, prohibits citizens with two or more convictions, or citizens who have been caught drunk driving, from receiving a license to own weapons.

Secretary of the General Council of United Russia, Andrey Turchak, stressed the need to toughen legislation on gun trafficking and find better approaches to protect schools. State Duma Chairman Vyacheslav Volodin expressed the need for a procedure to prevent unstable citizens from obtaining weapons. He also expressed the need for tougher responsibility on those who distribute false certificates to obtain weapons.

Human Rights ombudsman Tatyana Moskalkova proposed raising the age to obtain a weapon to 21.

Director of the National Guard of Russia, Viktor Zolotov, proposed a mandatory psychological test when receiving a permit for a firearm. He also proposed raising the age to obtain a permit to 21.

=== Other legislation ===
Volodin said the shooting introduced the need to discuss anonymity on the Internet in order to reduce extremist and violent content.

=== Prison life ===
On 30 June 2026, an 18-year-old girl from Moscow married Galyaviev in the prison. They exchanged rings and had a date. They first started talking when she was around 14 years old by sending letters, and she attended the trial and visited the perpetrator in prison.

== In popular culture ==
Footage shot during the crime at the high school, which students posted on social media, was included in the film Manifesto. In 2022, the film won the Envision competition at the Amsterdam Documentary Film Festival, and the director received a cash prize of 15,000 euros for the win.

== See also ==
=== Another school-attack incident that happened previously, in the same year: ===
- Perm State University shooting

==== Some other school shooting incidents in Russia: ====
- Anapa college shooting (2026)
- Bryansk gymnasium shooting (2023)
- Izhevsk school shooting (2022)
- Veshkayma kindergarten shooting (2022)
- Krasnoyarsk kindergarten shooting (2022)
- Blagoveshchensk college shooting (2019)
- Kerch Polytechnic College massacre (2018)
- Barabinsk college shooting (2018)
- Moscow school shooting and hostage taking (2014)
- Beslan school hostage crisis (2004)
- Kamyshin school massacre (1997)

==== Also: ====
- List of school attacks in Russia
- List of mass shootings in Russia
- List of school massacres by death toll
- List of attacks related to secondary schools
