= Perm State University shooting =

2021 school shooting in Russia

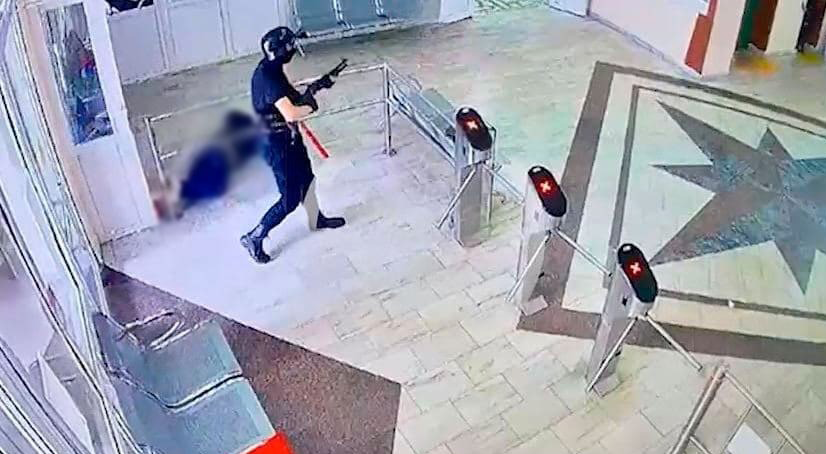
- The perpetrator on the first floor of university’s Building 8 during the massacre, caught on a surveillance camera.
- Location: 58.0075°N 56.1867°E; Perm State University, Perm, Perm Krai, Russia
- Date: 20 September 2021; 5 years ago 11:27 – ~11:35 a.m. (YEKT)
- Target: University students and staff, bystanders
- Attack type: Mass shooting, school shooting, mass murder, shootout
- Weapons: Perpetrator: Huglu Atrox Tactic 12-gauge pump-action shotgun; Knife; Defender: Makarov PM semi-automatic pistol
- Deaths: 6
- Injuries: 41 (24 with gunshot wounds, including the perpetrator, 17 indirectly)
- Perpetrator: Timur Bekmansurov
- Defender: Konstantin Kalinin
- Motive: Misanthropy; Desire to die (perpetrator's claim); Desire to oppose oneself to society (Investigative Committee's claim); Desire to demonstrate one's supposed "superiority" (Investigative Committee's claim)
- Convictions: Murder of two or more persons, committed in a generally dangerous way, with a rowdy motive; Attempted murder; Encroachment on the life of a law enforcement officer; Property damage committed in generally dangerous way, with a rowdy motive
- Sentence: Life imprisonment

On 20 September 2021, a mass shooting occurred at Perm State University, in the city of Perm, Perm Krai, Russia. Six people were killed and 41 others were injured. The attacker, identified as 18-year-old Timur Bekmansurov, was detained after being critically wounded by the police.

== Background ==
The shooting occurred four months after another Russian school shooting in Kazan, in which nine people were killed. In the aftermath of that shooting, the legal age to buy a gun in Russia was increased from 18 to 21, but the law was not yet in effect at the time of the Perm shooting. Authorities had blamed previous school shootings on foreign influence from news of similar incidents in the United States and elsewhere.

== Shooting ==
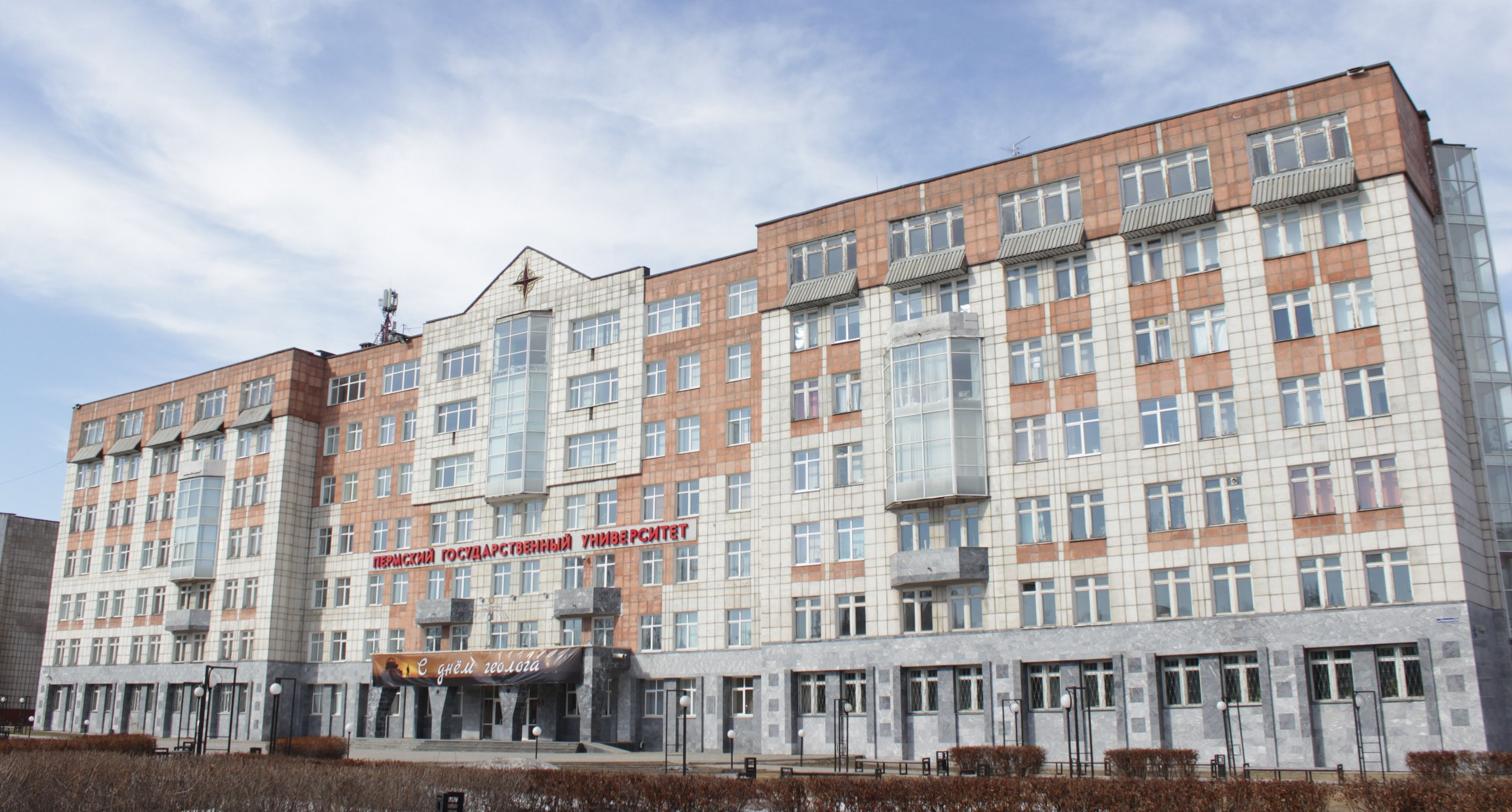
Building 8 of PSU in 2015

=== Summary ===
While the university has 12,000 students enrolled, only 3,000 individuals were on campus at the time of the shooting. The shooter was tracked by security cameras walking towards the university around 11:30 a.m. while carrying a shotgun. At the time of the shooting, the university had no panic button, only a single rotary dial phone to alert authorities. The guard on-duty was shot at and chased by the shooter before he could call authorities. A student at the university said that he heard gunshots while travelling in the elevator and that he saw what he believed to be the gunman shooting at two female students who were trying to escape.

At around 11:30 local time, a man wearing a military helmet and balaclava, carrying a seven-shot (6+1) 12-gauge Huglu Atrox Tactic pump-action shotgun approached Building 8 of Perm State University. Prior to this (the first reports of a man with a gun were recorded at 11:27 a.m.), he had fired several shots at passing vehicles and people at the campus entrance and on campus. During the massacre, the shooter carried 131 rounds (two bandoliers with twenty-six 12/76 rounds and forty-nine 12/70 rounds and pouch with forty-nine 12/70 rounds, also seven 12/70 rounds that he loaded in his shotgun). In total he fired thirty-seven shots.

Students and teachers inside the university, who were involved in lessons at the time, used furniture such as chairs to barricade the internal doors closed. Meanwhile, video footage from outside the university showed students using classroom windows to escape, and the gunman walking outside the building. Police arrived at the scene and challenged the gunman, with a gunfight ensuing. The suspect was wounded while resisting arrest and taken to a local hospital to be treated. By 5 October 2021, the perpetrator had regained consciousness after requiring a leg amputation for the wounds sustained during the gunfight with the police.

=== Event of the shooting ===
At 10:30, prior to the shooting, 18-year-old Timur Bekmansurov ordered a taxi and left his residence. He was carrying a bag containing the shotgun, ammunition, and the helmet. He was also wearing a jacket and a mask, and was carrying a knife in his pants. The taxi driver noticed the mask and made a small joke about it during the drive. The taxi arrived near the Perm II railway station, which located near the university (about 250 meters from station). Bekmansurov, having paid the taxi driver cashlessly (and also leaving him a 60-ruble tip), walked to the bus stop near the station. After spending about 15 minutes there, he headed towards a building on Ulitsa Genkelya (Genkelya Street), near university's western checkpoint. He hid next to the building and began preparing his weapon. He took off his jacket to reveal his two bandoliers and a black T-shirt that reads: "No Mercy". Bekmansurov also put on a Stahlhelm military helmet and took out a shotgun.

At 11:27, Bekmansurov emerged from behind a car and first shot at the windshield of an approaching car, hitting the driver. After shooting the driver, Bekmansurov began running towards the university's checkpoint. Bekmansurov fired a second shot, hitting an employee of Russian Railways. Bekmansurov then began firing at students just outside the checkpoint, wounding them. Several people, including the security guard, ran through the checkpoint to enter the university's courtyard. Bekmansurov followed them to the courtyard. At the courtyard, Bekmansurov indiscriminately fired at people, killing Yaroslav Aramelev and wounding several more. He also fired aimed shots at people outside buildings 6 and 8, wounding Margarita Engaus and others. A person would drag Engaus into the entrance of building 8.

At 11:30, the shooter entered building 8. At the same time, his manifesto and selfie were automatically published on VK. After Bekmansurov entered building 8, he killed Margarita Engaus, who was lying wounded on the floor, with a shot to the head. Bekmansurov stepped over the turnstiles and moved up to the second floor. At the second floor hallway, Bekmansurov encountered Ksenia Samchenko and Ekaterina Shakirova. Both girls had just exited the restroom. Bekmansurov shot them multiple times, killing them. After shooting the girls, Bekmansurov noticed a student run into an office. He fired a shot through the door before moving away towards a skyway to building 6.

At the skyway, Bekmansurov encountered Anna Aigeldina. He fatally shot her four times before moving towards building 6. Further into the skyway and just before reaching building 6, Bekmansurov fatally shot Alexandra Mokhova through the glass door to building 6.

At 11:32, Bekmansurov was on the second floor of building 6. He approached a barricaded classroom filled with over 50 students and a teacher. He fired several shots through the classroom's door, hitting no one, before moving downstairs. As he was walking downstairs, several students from building 8 began jumping out of the windows to escape. Bekmansurov, who was standing on a platform between the 1st and 2nd floor, noticed the students outside. He began firing multiple shots at them, wounding several students. He also shot the security guard, who was hiding in the courtyard after being chased out of his checkpoint by Bekmansurov. After firing, Bekmansurov began to descend to the first floor.

At 11:34, lieutenant Konstantin Kalinin encountered Bekmansurov at the first floor of building 6. Kalinin was informed of the shooting when a distressed witness approached him while he was responding to a traffic accident. Kalinin and his partner Vladimir Makarov, rushed to the campus and he was told by a student where the shooting was coming from. The partner started evacuating students while Kalinin entered building 6 and tried searching the lobby. As Kalinin looked for the shooter, he heard Bekmansurov walking down the stairs and reloading his shotgun. Bekmansurov appeared in front of Kalinin. Kalinin ordered Bekmansurov to drop the shotgun, but Bekmansurov didn't listen and aimed his shotgun at him. Bekmansurov fired a single shot at Kalinin and missed. Kalinin fired eight rounds from his pistol at Bekmansurov, hitting him with six shots. As Bekmansurov collapsed, Kalinin approached the shooter and moved away the shotgun and bandoliers. Bekmansurov tried reaching for his knife, but Kalinin grabbed it. Bekmansurov told Kalinin to kill him, but Kalinin began rendering first aid to Bekmansurov.

== Victims ==
Six people were killed during the shooting. They were identified as five women and one man, aged between 18 and 66 years old:

1. Yaroslav Aramelev (19), student of the faculty of Physics. Died first, outside the university buildings;
2. Margarita Engaus (66), came to the university with her grandson on excursion;
3. Ksenia Samchenko (18), student of the faculty of Geography;
4. Ekaterina Shakirova (19), student of the faculty of Geography. Killed along with Samchenko;
5. Anna Aigeldina (24), former student, came on that day to get her master's degree diploma;
6. Alexandra Mokhova (20), student of the faculty of Mechanics and Mathematics. The last victim.

All of the deceased, except Yaroslav Aramelev, were shot execution-style at close range by the perpetrator after sustaining initial wounds. Forty others were injured (including 23 who were wounded by gunfire), with all except the gunman in stable condition by 22 September.

== Perpetrator ==
Russian police named 18-year-old law student Timur Maratovich Bekmansurov (Russian: Тимур Маратович Бекмансуров) as the gunman. He was born in Glazov, Udmurt Republic on 8 March 2003 and specialised in forensics. His mother worked as an accountant, and his father worked in the police force, then served in the military on a contract basis and participated in conflicts in Syria and Afghanistan. He left the family in 2009. After the divorce, the mother and son moved to Perm, where Bekmansurov enrolled in a local school. Prior to the shooting, Bekmansurov had posted an image of himself with a shotgun, helmet, and ammunition to his VK account while showing his middle finger. He captioned the photo with the statement: "I've thought about this for a long time, it's been years and I realized the time has come to do what I dreamt of." In the post, he also said he was "overflowing with hate". He later clarified "What happened was not a terrorist attack (at least from a legal point of view). I was not a member of an extremist organization, I was nonreligious and apolitical. Nobody knew what I was going to do, I carried out all these actions myself." Bekmansurov's left leg was partially amputated due to a blood clot in the hospital.

A spokesperson for the Russian National Guard told reporters that Bekmansurov legally owned a shotgun for hunting as well.

According to the publicized testimony of the former teacher: "Timur was distinguished by his intelligence, helped if asked, and also liked Hitler, supported his views, said he would have done the same". From the testimony of Bekmansurov's classmate it became known that during the conversation he suggested that he personally or jointly come with him to commit a mass murder: either to shoot people or to run them down with a car. He wanted to film it all on camera, like a documentary movie.

== Legal proceedings ==
A criminal case against the attacker was initiated under Part 2 of Art. 105 (murder of two or more persons, committed in a generally dangerous way, with a rowdy motive), Part 3, Art. 30 of Art. 105 (attempted murder), Art. 317 (encroachment on the life of a law enforcement officer) and under Part 2 of Art. 167 (damage to another's property in a generally dangerous way, with a rowdy motive) of the Criminal Code of the Russian Federation. Relatives of the dead and those injured in the shooting filed suits against the defendant for moral damages in the total amount of 25.1 million rubles (~US$ 300,000).

According to the results of a psychiatric examination, Bekmansurov was diagnosed with schizoid personality disorder, but he was declared sane at the time of the crime.

=== Main trial ===
The trial took place from September to December 2022: during the proceedings, Bekmansurov made a confession. Details of the crime were revealed. Some of the court hearings were broadcast live by regional mass media.

In October, during a court hearing, Bekmansurov admitted to using illicit substances: according to him, he started using snus at the age of 13, doing so daily and on multiple occasions — right up until the time of the offence at university — and began using psychedelic drugs at the age of 14. In May 2021, he tried ecstasy.

At the subsequent court hearings, following the reading out of the list of physical evidence, the prosecutor asked Bekmansurov what should be done with some of his belongings: a computer, four memory cards, a tablet and three mobile phones — he asked for the smartphone he had taken with him on the day of the shooting to be destroyed, as well as his shoes, jacket and socks, and asked for the Lenovo all-in-one computer and smartwatch to be handed over to his mother. Bekmansurov's testimony was also voiced at the court hearings, he said that he hated people. During his testimony, Bekmansurov said that before and after the shooting at PGNIU everything seemed unreal to him — as if he was watching what was happening from the outside. He considered different ways to commit suicide, but he said he "didn't have the guts" to make up his mind. The desire to die became the motive for the crime. Bekmansurov wanted to be killed when he was arrested. Bekmansurov's read-out testimony showed that he did not remember killing some people on the day of the shooting. He also said that he had never developed relationships with his peers and was ridiculed in the first grade. Bekmansurov claimed at trial that he suffered from suicidal and paranoid thoughts, tinnitus in his ears and head, and feelings of tightness in his brain. It follows from Bekmansurov's testimony read out in court that in May 2021 he had uncontrollable outbursts of aggression. He could not explain their cause. He began to direct his aggression towards his girlfriend, fearing that he would not be able to control himself and would take her life, Bekmansurov broke up with his girlfriend. It also appears from his testimony that if he had met her on the day of the massacre, he would not have shot her because he loved her.

==== Court verdict ====
In November 2022, the state prosecution demanded that Bekmansurov be sentenced to life imprisonment. Bekmansurov admitted his guilt in full in court, expressed remorse, and asked the court not to sentence him to life imprisonment. But the court refused, and on 28 December 2022, Timur Bekmansurov received a life sentence.

==== Appeals ====
In early 2024, Bekmansurov filed an appeal to the Supreme Court asking for the life sentence to be overturned, the case was heard on May 7, 2024, Bekmansurov tried to argue that he was insane and his life sentence should be overturned. He described himself as feeble-minded, claimed that he was suffering from psychosis and that the [medical examiners were mistaken and did not pay attention to his well-being. During the hearing, the prosecutor said that the defendant did not have dementia or psychosis. The verdict was upheld.

=== Afterword ===
In early 2025, court documents were made public: they show among other things that Bekmansurov studied in detail the behavior of other mass murderers and the mistakes they made in committing massacres.

== Aftermath ==
=== Memory ===
Students, faculty, and residents of Perm used the exterior fence of the university to create a makeshift memorial with carnations, candles, photos, and other items.

Minister Dmitry Chernyshenko announced that a chapel in memory of the victims will be built on the territory of PGNIU. In 2023, an Orthodox cross was opened on the territory of the university. In November 2024, the chapel was opened. Dmitry Makhonin, Governor of Perm Krai, took part in the ceremony of consecration and opening of the chapel. Some university staff and students opposed the construction on the university campus. Erection of a memorial cross also caused controversy among students and staff of the university. A publication about the unveiling of the cross sparked a discussion about its necessity.

=== Reaction ===
Authorities have blamed foreign influence for previous school shootings, and the attack has brought forward additional questions and potential legal changes. Kremlin spokesman Dmitry Peskov announced on 20 September that legislative action had already been taken to further restrict gun purchases.

=== Serving a prison sentence ===
As of 2026, Bekmansurov is serving a life sentence at the "Polar Owl" colony. He was originally serving a three-year prison sentence.

=== Copycats and inspired incidents ===
- On 6 April 2023 in Asovo, Perm Krai, 7th-grade student named by journalists as "Denis" took a knife to his school and stabbed seven times his classmate in the corridor during classes. Perpetrator was stopped by the physical education teacher. The wounded student was taken to the hospital, where he was treated and discharged five days later. "Denis" had previously threatened his classmates, and materials about school attacks were found on his phone.
- On 11 February 2026 in Anapa, Krasnodar Krai, a 17-year-old student opened fire at his college, killing a security guard and wounding two other people. He failed to enter the college because the security guard managed to block the entrance before being killed. The criminal was detained at the scene. Before the attack, he posted photos and videos of criminals who had previously attacked educational institutions, including Timur Bekmansurov and Vladislav Roslyakov, on his social media.
- The perpetrator of the Calama school stabbing had "Timur Bekmansurov" written on one of his knives.

== See also ==
Another school-attack incident that happened previously, in the same year:

- Kazan gymnasium bombing and shooting

Some other school shooting incidents in Russia:

- 2026 Anapa college shooting
- 2023 Bryansk gymnasium shooting
- 2022 Izhevsk school shooting
- 2022 Veshkayma kindergarten shooting
- 2022 Krasnoyarsk kindergarten shooting
- 2019 Blagoveshchensk college shooting
- 2018 Kerch Polytechnic College bombing and shooting
- 2018 Barabinsk college shooting
- 2014 Moscow school shooting and hostage taking
- 2004 Beslan school hostage crisis
- 1997 Kamyshin school massacre

Also:

- List of school attacks in Russia
- List of mass shootings in Russia
- List of school massacres by death toll
- List of attacks related to post-secondary schools
