= 2023 Bryansk school shooting =

School shooting in Bryansk, Russia

Bryansk school shooting
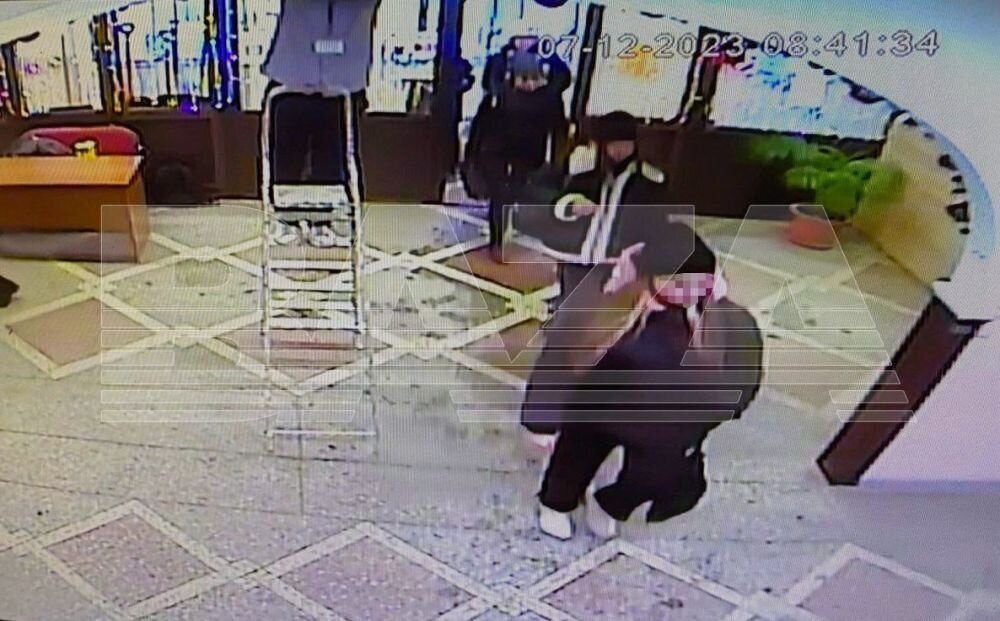
- Afanaskina (in the background) at the entrance to the school before the shooting, 08:41
- Location: 53.295216°N 34.314808°E; Gymnasium No. 5 Bryansk, Russia
- Date: 7 December 2023; 2 years ago
- Attack type: School shooting, mass shooting, murder-suicide
- Weapons: Bekas-3 pump-action shotgun (pistol-gripped); Hunting knife (unused)
- Deaths: 2 (including the perpetrator)
- Injuries: 5 (one assessed as serious, four more in a condition of moderate severity)
- Perpetrator: Alina Afanaskina
- Motive: Unknown

On 7 December 2023, a mass shooting occurred at a gymnasium in Bryansk, Russia. One student was killed and five others were wounded before the shooter, Alina Afanaskina, committed suicide.

== Shooting ==
A message about a shooting at Gymnasium No. 5 was received by the city dispatch service at 09:15 Moscow time.

Afanaskina hid a Bekas-3 shotgun belonging to her father in a paper tube and had a knife tucked into her right boot while walking to school. She entered a biology classroom on the fourth floor and fired several shots. The shooting resulted in two fatalities, including the perpetrator, and five injuries. One of the injured individuals was in serious condition, while the other four sustained moderate injuries. Following the incident, the remaining students were promptly evacuated, and arrangements were made for them to return home.

The only deceased victim was identified as fourteen-year-old Maria Nesmachnaya, the shooter's classmate. The girls grew up in the same neighborhood and attended each other's birthday parties a year before the attack.

Afanaskina had a twin sister who was present in the classroom at the time of the incident. Both sisters arrived at the school together, although investigators have suggested that the twin may not have been aware of Alina's plans.

== Investigation ==
Fourteen-year-old Alina Dmitrievna Afanaskina (Russian: Алина Дмитриевна Афанаскина), an eighth-grade progymnasium student, was identified as the perpetrator of the shooting. The Investigative Committee of the Russian Federation opened a criminal case under Part 2 of Art. 105 Criminal Code of the Russian Federation.

Afanaskina reportedly did not show signs of aggressive tendencies prior to the shooting. She performed well in school and was not known to misbehave. Teachers and students described Afanaskina as a "quiet”, "calm” and "polite” person who had problems with communication with schoolmates; in general, she only interacted with her sister. One of the acquaintances stated that both of them "studied well, although they did not shine with any special knowledge. Ordinary girls – they always dressed normally, walked and hung out with their friends (though, again, not too much), smoked vapes”.

During the investigation, Afanaskina's father testified that his daughter’s behavior worsened significantly during the last year of her life; she "acted like a zombie”, "constantly slamming doors”, to the point when he "was afraid to approach her” and considered taking her to a specialist.

Afanaskina had a conflict with some of her classmates a few months before the shooting, which resulted in a meeting with their parents held by a homeroom teacher. Some of the gymnasium’s students pointed out that she'd been "made fun of” and called "strange”, presumably due to her withdrawn nature, while other witnesses denied it. According to a student who knew both sisters, Afanaskina's twin claimed that any bullying did not take place in their class and that nothing happened at home in the recent past.

As State Duma deputy Alexander Khinshtein reported, among the shooter's personal belongings found at the crime scene was a backpack, a box of cartridges and note that the girl "must definitely meet with a friend". The investigation of the shooting was taken control by Commissioner under the President of the Russian Federation for Children's Rights Maria Lvova-Belova.

The alleged internet diary, initially linked to the perpetrator, that contained references to Dylan Klebold and Ilnaz Galyaviev was labeled by investigators as fabricated, with its content published and edited several hours after Afanaskina's death. Based on surviving search queries from her computer and the boots that she wore during the attack, police experts concluded that she could possibly be mimicking "one of the modern school shooters”, which wasn't specified.

Dmitry Afanaskin, the father of the attacker who reportedly taught her how to use a shotgun, was detained, facing correctional labor for up to two years, or compulsory labor for up to 480 hours, or imprisonment for up to two years in accordance with Criminal Code 224.2 of the Russian Federation. He was also charged with Article 110 of the Criminal Code of the Russian Federation (incitement to suicide).

On 9 December, Larisa Katolikova, deputy director of Gymnasium No. 5, where the shooting took place, was detained. Katolikova was charged under Part 3 of Article 293 of the Criminal Code of the Russian Federation – negligence that resulted in the death of two or more persons.

Afanaskina's father's trial began in December 2024, and he was acquitted of the charge of driving her to suicide. Afanaskin pleaded not guilty to the charge of negligent possession of a weapon. At the request of the victims, the sessions were closed.

According to Mash, the attacker could have been recruited by "curators" from the organization Maniac Murder Cult, which is considered extremist and banned in Russia. The eighth-grader allegedly communicated with them in thematic chat rooms. Alternatively, the version about joining a sect was taken into account. In 2025, after being contacted by journalists, a person presenting themself as Anton Mishashin, creator of the online radical movement RNBWN (previously associated with the 2024 Chelyabinsk school stabbing), claimed that Afanaskina's actions were influenced by the group.

On 19 March 2025, Dmitry Afanaskin was sentenced to 1 year and 8 months of correctional labor with 15% of his salary withheld in favor of the state, as well as deprived of the right to purchase or possess weapons for 2.5 years. The court found him guilty of negligent possession of weapons, causing death and injury to minors.

== See also ==
Other school shooting incidents in Russia:

- 2026 Anapa college shooting
- 2022 Izhevsk school shooting
- 2022 Veshkayma kindergarten shooting
- 2022 Krasnoyarsk kindergarten shooting
- 2021 Perm State University shooting
- 2021 Kazan gymnasium bombing and shooting
- 2019 Blagoveshchensk college shooting
- 2018 Kerch Polytechnic College bombing and shooting
- 2018 Barabinsk college shooting
- 2014 Moscow school shooting and hostage taking
- 2004 Beslan school hostage crisis
- 1997 Kamyshin school massacre

Also:

- List of school shootings in Russia
- List of mass shootings in Russia
- List of attacks related to secondary schools
- List of school massacres by death toll
