= 2022 Krasnoyarsk kindergarten shooting =

2022 foiled school shooting in Krasnoyarsk, Russia

Krasnoyarsk kindergarten shooting
- Location: 56.015743°N 92.820329°E; Kindergarten № 31, Menzhinskogo Street, Krasnoyarsk, Russia
- Date: 28 March 2022; 14:00
- Target: Men and boys at Kindergarten № 31
- Attack type: Shooting; androcide; attempted mass shooting; attempted mass murder; attempted school shooting; Patricide
- Weapon: 12-gauge МР-135 pump shotgun
- Deaths: 1 (at the perpetrator's home)
- Perpetrator: Polina Dvorkina
- Defender: Kindergarten staff
- Motive: Misandry

The Krasnoyarsk kindergarten shooting was an attempted anti-male massacre that occurred on 28 March 2022. On that day, Polina Dvorkina, a 19-year-old who expressed hatred towards men, fatally shot her father at their home in Krasnoyarsk, Russia, before entering Kindergarten № 31, where she planned to commit a mass shooting by killing all the men and boys in the school. Dvorkina was apprehended by school staff and no one at the school was hurt. The attempted attack is believed to be the first crime in Russia's history committed on the basis of anti-male sentiment.

== Events ==
During the morning hours of 28 March 2022, at 4:00 a.m., Dvorkina attacked her father at their home by violently hitting him on the head with a dumbbell, causing him to fall and start bleeding. She then shot him with a 12-gauge shotgun, killing him instantly. During her court appearance, Dvorkina claimed that her father was drunk and shouted that he wanted to kill her. Later that day, she left her house and entered the Kindergarten № 31 building on Menzhinskogo Street at around 14:00, hiding a shotgun under her coat. The guards recognized her because she previously came to the kindergarten a few days before to apply for a job. She was able to enter the building under the pretext that she needed to pick up a child. In the "Caramel" group at that time, a total of 17 children, all between the ages of 4 and 5, were sleeping during the quiet hour. The teacher noticed a shotgun under Dvorkina's coat, shouted, and started resisting. During the arrest, Dvorkina fired a shot, and the bullet hit the wall. She was apprehended by one of the kindergarten employees, a physical education instructor. The caretakers held Dvorkina until law enforcement arrived.

== Perpetrator ==
Polina Platonovna Dvorkina (Russian: Полина Платоновна Дворкина; at birth – Sofia Olegovna Kechina) was born in 2002 into the family of a Krasnoyarsk journalist and Oleg Stepanovich Kechin, director and co-founder of a publishing center. Polina became interested in the ideas of radical feminism and anti-male-leaning content at the age of 12. She studied the works of foreign authors of the movement and became a misandrist. She shaved her head, explained why she hated men, spoke negatively about men, and called for worldwide violence against men and boys. During her trial, Dvorkina stated that since childhood her mother and father did not take care of her, she was left to herself, and that her parents drank heavily and did not pay any attention to her. Shortly before the attack, Dvorkina changed her surname, first name and patronymic to Polina Dvorkina in honor of the American feminist writer Andrea Rita Dworkin. She wrote a feminist manifesto, which she sent to foreign media outlets, in which she declared the need for "women to commit violent acts and murders against men". According to Dvorkina, she wanted to use her manifesto to protest against the "exploitation of women". In the fall of 2021, she purchased a hunting shotgun. She earned the money for the shotgun working at KFC, though her father contributed some of it. Dvorkina searched for a kindergarten in three different districts, specifically ones with a large number of boys, and tried to get a job there so she could see the layout of the rooms. However, the job opening turned out to be no longer available. Her choice of Kindergarten № 31 was no accident — she had previously gone there for an interview and noted in her testimony that security at the facility was lax. At the time of the attack on the kindergarten, Dvorkina was wearing a T-shirt with anti-male writing encouraging violence against men.

== Legal proceedings ==
Dvorkina at a court hearing in 2023

A criminal case was opened against Dvorkina under articles on attempted murder of two or more people, including minors, and under an article for murder. She fully admitted her guilt in the murder and partially admitted her guilt in the attack on the kindergarten. As part of the investigation, law enforcement agencies organized checks in relation to officials of the kindergarten and the company providing security services for the kindergarten. A psychological and psychiatric examination found Dvorkina to be sane.

In April 2023, the court fined Dvorkina 10,000 rubles (US$108 in 2023) under the administrative article on incitement of hostility or hatred towards the "male sex". The court found that she had sent a feminist manifesto to the media, which included calls for women to commit violent acts and kill men.

In July 2023, the court sentenced Dvorkina to 17 years imprisonment with 2 years restriction of liberty and ordered outpatient treatment by a psychiatrist at the place of incarceration. A claim in favor of Dvorkina's mother in the amount of 1 million rubles (US$10,770 in 2023) as moral compensation was also satisfied. In her last statement, Dvorkina stated:

"Now the thinking has changed...there are women in the detention center who have children and they love them...I began to appreciate families and small children...it becomes shameful when women in the detention center talk about their children...I realized that one should strive for family, for goodness, love...it is shameful that at the moment when the citizens of the country are defending the motherland, I committed crimes...".

Dvorkina appealed against the court's judgment. On 31 January 2024, the court left the verdict against her unchanged.

The security guard on duty at the kindergarten on the day of the attack and her boss, the director of the security company, were both sentenced to 2 to 2.5 years, respectively, in a general regime colony under Article 238 of the Criminal Code of the Russian Federation (providing services that do not meet safety requirements). In March 2024, the female security guard was released on parole, and later that year, the director of the security company was also released.

== Aftermath ==
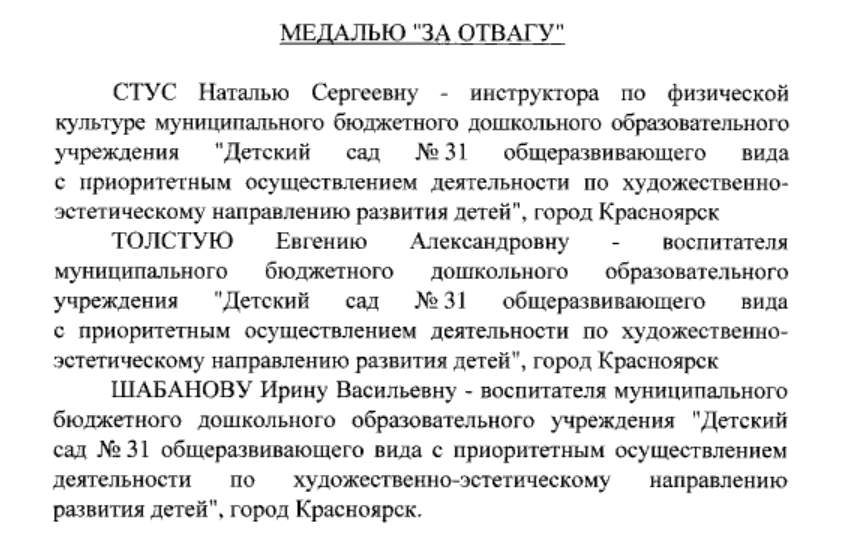
Decree of the Russian Federation on the awarding of educators of Krasnoyarsk

The prosecutor's office said that such a crime has not been seen in the history of Russia, where a mass shooter was motivated by feminist ideology.

Alexander Bastrykin, the chairman of the Investigative Committee, has put the investigation of the criminal case under the control of the central office of the department. President Vladimir Putin awarded medals «For Bravery» to three Krasnoyarsk educators who stopped the attacker.

As of 2025, Dvorkina was serving her sentence in Krasnoyarsk colony № 22, as well as undergoing treatment with a psychiatrist and seeing a psychologist. She has been diagnosed with "polymorphic personality disorder". While serving her sentence in the colony, Dvorkina was employed as a seamstress. She participates in cultural, educational, and sporting events. She also took part in patriotic events dedicated to Victory in the Great Patriotic War and the Immortal Regiment campaign.

== See also ==
Another school-attack incidents that happened later, in the same year:

- Veshkayma kindergarten shooting
- Izhevsk school shooting

Some other school shooting incidents in Russia:

- 2026 Anapa college shooting
- 2023 Bryansk gymnasium shooting
- 2021 Perm State University shooting
- 2021 Kazan gymnasium bombing and shooting
- 2019 Blagoveshchensk college shooting
- 2018 Kerch Polytechnic College bombing and shooting
- 2018 Barabinsk college shooting
- 2014 Moscow school shooting and hostage taking
- 2004 Beslan school hostage crisis
- 1997 Kamyshin school massacre

Also:

- List of school attacks in Russia
- List of mass shootings in Russia
- Violence against men
