= 2019 Blagoveshchensk college shooting =

School shooting in Amur Oblast, Russia

Blagoveshchensk college shooting
- Location: 50.2694°N 127.5283°E; Blagoveshchensk, Amur Oblast, Russia
- Date: 14 November 2019; 6 years ago
- Attack type: Mass shooting, school shooting, murder-suicide, shootout
- Weapon: 12-gauge IZh-81 pump-action shotgun
- Deaths: 2 (including the perpetrator)
- Injuries: 3
- Perpetrator: Daniil Zasorin
- Motive: Probably retaliation for college bullying

On 14 November 2019, a shooting occurred at the Amur College of Construction, Housing and Utilities in Blagoveshchensk, Amur Oblast, Russia. One student was killed and three others were wounded, before the perpetrator committed suicide.

== Events ==
According to one version, on 14 November 2019, at approximately 10:15-10:17 a.m. local time, student Daniil Zasorin arrived late to class, causing the teacher to ask him to leave the classroom. He went out, however, after a while he returned, hiding the weapon under his outer clothing. The student started smoking in the corridor of the educational institution, and when he was reprimanded — took out a five-shot (4+1) shotgun IZh-81 and opened fire. Eyewitnesses to the incident rushed to the street, where at the time patrolled the area traffic policemen. Arriving at the scene of the shooting, the police saw a young man with a shotgun on the second floor. The latter fired several times in the direction of the law enforcers. The police returned fire, wounding the assailant in the thigh, as well as in the left and right shoulder. By blocking the shooter in one of the classrooms, students and faculty members were allowed to leave the college. Subsequently, the gunman shot himself.

The preliminary cause of the events in the Department of Internal Affairs of Russia in the Amur region was a conflict between peers.

== Victims ==
The deceased was identified as the killer's classmate, 19-year-old Alexei Golubnichy.
Also injured were:

- Vladislav Rozhkov (born 1999) — buttock wound;
- Egor Stasyuk (born 2002) — wound to the upper third of the left thigh;
- Kasyan Kamanets (born 2002) — wound to the neck, occipital region, and left forearm.

== Legal proceedings ==
The Investigative Committee of the Amur Region initiated a criminal case on the fact of the incident on the grounds of a crime under paragraphs "a", "j", part 2 of article 105 of the Criminal Code of the Russian Federation (murder of two or more persons with a rowdy motive). Alexander Bastrykin instructed to check the organization of the security system in the educational institution as part of the investigation, as well as to assess the actions of all college officials and to establish the reasons that contributed to the commission of the crime by the student.

A criminal case was opened against the employees of the private security organization "Sirius-A" on the grounds of a crime under part 3 of article 238 of the Criminal Code of the Russian Federation (performance of work or provision of services that do not meet safety requirements, resulting in the death of two or more persons by negligence). Criminal proceedings were also initiated against officials of the educational institution on the grounds of a crime under part 2 of article 293 of the Criminal Code of the Russian Federation (negligence, i.e. improper performance by an official of his duties, resulting in the death of a person by negligence).

Oleg Ermolov, an employee of the private security organization Sirius-A, who was guarding the educational building, and the director of the security firm, Sergei Andryushchenko, were arrested (until 14 January). On 30 September 2022, the Blagoveshchensk City Court sentenced both defendants to a fine of 400 thousand rubles and released them from punishment, counting the time they spent in custody and under house arrest, and ordered them to pay 20 thousand rubles each to the three victims and 200 thousand rubles to the mother of the deceased student as compensation for moral harm.

== Perpetrator ==
Daniil Zasorin

The college shooting was committed by a 19-year-old student of the institution, Daniil Viktorovich Zasorin (Russian: Даниил Викторович Засорин, born in 2000). Zasorin grew up in a family consisting of his mother, stepfather, and younger brother. According to reports from the shooter's acquaintances, Daniil had a calm and balanced character, and planned to become a programmer in the future. His stepfather allowed Daniil to buy a shotgun because he intended to go hunting with him.

According to Deputy Prosecutor General Igor Tkachev, the staff of the draft board in Blagoveshchensk knew about the student's suicidal tendencies, but according to the current instructions could not report it to the college.

A video Zasorin uploaded to YouTube was discovered, in which he discussed his past and said that no one who would be "blamed on TV" could have prevented the incident.

== Aftermath ==
The case of the shooting at an educational institution has re-raised the issue of inadequate security and public access to firearms. The case of the shooting at Amur College is no exception.

The college was taken into protective custody by Rosgvardiya soldiers. There were proposals to transfer all higher and secondary educational institutions to departmental security. However, later a contract for security services was concluded with the PSC "Rosbezopasnost".

College director Viktor Petukhov was dismissed "For improper performance of his official duties in terms of organizing safe conditions of the educational institution". Oleg Yakutov, Deputy Minister of Education and Science of Priamurye region, resigned at his own request.

The families of the victims of the incident received compensation from the reserve fund of the government of the Amur region, totaling about 2.5 million rubles.

As a result of the incident, since 19 November 2019, all educational institutions in the region implemented tightened access control and security, identified the need for additional equipment, and prepared for the introduction of a "tutoring" system. Checks were being carried out on the operability of security alarms, fire alarms, video surveillance and notification systems.

== See also ==
Some other school shooting incidents in Russia:

- 2026 Anapa college shooting
- 2023 Bryansk gymnasium shooting
- 2022 Izhevsk school shooting
- 2022 Veshkayma kindergarten shooting
- 2022 Krasnoyarsk kindergarten shooting
- 2021 Perm State University shooting
- 2021 Kazan gymnasium bombing and shooting
- 2018 Kerch Polytechnic College bombing and shooting
- 2018 Barabinsk college shooting
- 2014 Moscow school shooting and hostage taking
- 2004 Beslan school hostage crisis
- 1997 Kamyshin military school shooting

Also:

- Saugus High School shooting — another school shooting incident that happened on the same day
- List of school attacks in Russia
- List of mass shootings in Russia
- List of attacks related to post-secondary schools
- List of school massacres by death toll
