= 2022 Veshkayma kindergarten shooting =

2022 school shooting and murder-suicide in Russia

Veshkayma kindergarten shooting
- Location: 54°03′23.9″N 47°07′01.7″E; Veshkayma, Ulyanovsk Oblast, Russia
- Date: 26 April 2022; 4 years ago
- Attack type: Mass shooting, murder-suicide, school shooting, pedicide
- Weapon: IZh-27 shotgun
- Deaths: 5 (including the perpetrator and the gun's original owner)
- Injuries: 1
- Perpetrator: Ruslan Akhtyamov

On 26 April 2022, three people were killed in a school shooting at a kindergarten in Veshkayma, Ulyanovsk Oblast, Russia.

== Shooting ==
The attack occurred after 26-year-old Ruslan Akhtyamov entered the Ryabinka kindergarten with an IZh-27 double-barreled shotgun, shooting dead a staff member who tried to stop the attack. Walking into a classroom during the children's naptime, he opened fire, killing two small children, whom RIA Novosti said had been born in 2016 and 2018. Another staff member was wounded. After the shooting, Akhtyamov then turned the gun on himself and committed suicide.

The National Guard of Russia said that the firearm used by the perpetrator was obtained under the name of another person. Izvestia reported that the firearm's owner had been found dead, presumably killed by the kindergarten shooter.

== Perpetrator ==
The shooter was identified as 26-year-old Ruslan Rushanovich Akhtyamov (Russian: Руслан Рушанович Ахтямов; born 22 April 1996). Reports indicated that he had been struggling with mental illness.

== Victims ==
Five people were killed in the attack:

1. Alexander Dronin (68 years old) — Akhtyamov's neighbor whom he stole the gun from (died prior to the attack)
2. Olga Mitrofanova (35 years old) — teacher of the Ryabinka kindergarten
3. Ekaterina Sosnova (5 years old) — kindergarten student
4. Vladimir Krylov (6 years old) — kindergarten student
5. Ruslan Akhtyamov (26 years old) — the assailant in the attack; committed suicide.

One person was injured, a 52-year-old assistant teacher.

== Reactions ==
The governor of the Ulyanovsk region, Aleksey Russkikh, said that the families of the victims would be provided with medical, psychological and social assistance. Ombudsman Tatyana Moskalkova called on the National Guard to be on duty in schools and kindergartens. Russkikh and Yuri Bezdudny, the governor of the Yamalo-Nenets Autonomous Okrug, provided their condolences for the tragedy.

== See also ==
Another school-attack incidents that happened in the same year:

- Krasnoyarsk kindergarten shooting
- Izhevsk school shooting

Some other school shooting incidents in Russia:

- 2026 Anapa college shooting
- 2023 Bryansk gymnasium shooting
- 2021 Perm State University shooting
- 2021 Kazan gymnasium bombing and shooting
- 2019 Blagoveshchensk college shooting
- 2018 Kerch Polytechnic College bombing and shooting
- 2018 Barabinsk college shooting (in Russian)
- 2014 Moscow school shooting and hostage taking
- 2004 Beslan school hostage crisis
- 1997 Kamyshin school massacre

Also:

- List of school massacres by death toll
- List of school shootings in Russia
- List of mass shootings in Russia
- List of attacks related to primary schools
