= List of school attacks in Russia =

This chronological list of school attacks in Russia that occurred at K–12 public and private schools, as well as at colleges and universities, and on school buses. Excluded from this list are the following:

1. Incidents that occurred as a result of police actions.
2. Suicides or suicide attempts involving only one person.

== List ==
Date	Location	Perpetrator(s)	Dead	Injured	Description
5 May 1874	Yekaterinburg	Alexei Skachkov	1	0	A student of Yekaterinburg gymnasium was noticed smoking in the toilet by his head teacher, Yakov Predtechensky; after a decision to expel Skachkov, he murdered Predtechensky using a revolver. Sentenced to deportation to Siberia and ban from ever returning to Yekaterinburg.
15 September 1900	Kharkiv	Iwanow	1	1	After failing an exam, gymnasium student Iwanow shot and killed principal Tschanowitsch with a revolver and also wounded a teacher named Horkiwicz before surrendering to police.
19 February 1937	Zavidovo	Ilya Ageenko	1	0	Zoya Peshekhonova, a teacher who gave a student bad grades, was shot and killed. The student was identified as 16-year-old Ilya Ageenko.
4 April 1950	Gîsca	Vladimir Georgievich Tatarnikov	24 (including the perpetrator)	Unknown	Gîsca school bombing: A military commander detonated a large bomb at a school in Gyska, killing himself, two other teachers and 21 students.
11 February 1958	Lyamino, Perm Oblast	Mikhail Tselousov	7	6	Lyamino school shooting: 24-year-old Mikhail Tselousov fatally shot seven people and wounded six others at School of Construction N°6 as retaliation for perceived unfair treatment at his workplace. He was sentenced to death and executed one year later.
19 May 1977	Leningrad	Anatoly Fedorenko	6	3 (including the perpetrator)	1977 Leningrad shooting: Anatoly Fedorenko killed six cadets and wounded two. He was also injured by one of the fatally wounded cadets. Sentenced to death.
December 1987	Moscow	Grigory Kuts	1	0	Grigory Kuts killed his physical education teacher with a TT pistol after classes. Earlier Kuts shot dead plant director. He was sentenced to 15 years in prison as a minor. He was later sentenced to death for another murder in prison.
28 September 1993	Omsk	Alexey Anatolyevich Paliy	1 (the perpetrator)	0	Alexey Anatolyevich Paliy stormed a kindergarten and took several hostages. Armed with a rifle and explosives, the assailant died during the hostage crisis.
27 October 1995	Saransk, Mordovia	Viktor Grush	1	0	Viktor Grushev and three other criminals from the "Yugo-Zapad" criminal group invaded Mordovia State University and killed a professor before fleeing and later being captured.
5 December 1995	Vladikavkaz, North Ossetia–Alania	Yuri Kardanov	3	8 (including the perpetrator)	A 35-year-old man detonated grenades at a kindergarten around 1 p.m., killing three children and injuring seven others — three children, two teachers and two policemen — as well as himself.
9 March 1997	Kamyshin, Volgograd Oblast	Sergey Lepnev	6	2	Kamyshin school shooting: Sergey Lepnev shot and killed five cadets and a commander and wounded two other cadets. Sentenced to death and later commuted to 25 years in prison due to moratorium.
11 May 1998	Voronezh, Voronezh Oblast	Andrei Gorbunov	3	1 (the perpetrator)	Andrei Gorbunov, 44, stormed Voronezh State University and killed professor Viktor Suborin with a machete before attempting suicide. Earlier, the attacker killed his wife and son.
13 June 1999	Saint Petersburg	Unnamed	1	1	A man stormed a university and shot an employee and a security guard, killing the guard.
10 October 2002	Lyubertsy, Moscow Oblast	Unnamed	1	2	The principal, Vadim Menis, was shot dead as he left a school, and two employees who tried to help him were injured. The shooter fled the scene and was arrested years later.
1-3 September 2004	Beslan, North Ossetia–Alania	Riyad-us Saliheen Brigade of Martyrs	365-731 (including 31 perpetrators)	800+	Beslan school hostage crisis: Dozens of terrorists took hundreds of people hostage in a school; the siege, which lasted for days, ended in the death and injury of hundreds of victims and the deaths of the attackers, who were linked to the group "Riyad-us Saliheen Brigade of Martyrs". Between 365 and 731 people died, making it the worst school massacre in Russian history.
2 August 2011	Komsomolsk-on-Amur, Khabarovsk krai	Andrei Baturin	0	1	At Kindergarten №80 in Komsomolsk-on-Amur, a 5-year-old girl was injured. A criminal case was opened under the article for "terrorist act".
5 August 2011	Izberbash, Repuplic of Dagestan	Unnamed	2	0	Two policemen were shot dead at the scene after being targeted in a daycare center. The shooter is still being sought.
3 February 2014	Moscow	Sergey Viktorovich Gordeyev	2	1	2014 Moscow school shooting: A 15-year-old student shot dead teacher, took hostages, killed the arriving policeman, along with injured another one before surrendering.
20 October 2014	Elektrostal, Moscow Oblast	Unnamed 9th grade student	1	0	A student attacked a security guard with a baseball bat and then stabbed him to death. The student was restrained by a teacher until police arrived.
4 December 2014	Tomsk, Tomsk Oblast	Tom	0	4	A former student named “Tom” broke into a private gym in Tomsk, injuring four people with a compressed air gun, three students and the director. No one had serious injuries.
20 March 2015	Tomsk, Tomsk Oblast	Unnamed 9th grade student	0	2	In an attack at School N°64, two students were lightly wounded by gunfire from a ninth-grader, who was later arrested.
30 November 2015	Saratov, Saratov Oblast	Rasim Kerimov	1	2	During an argument, a 45-year-old father of a student fired shots at Azamat Normanov, who died in the attack, in addition to wounding two other adults, before being detained.
18 March 2016	Nakhodka, Primorsky Krai	Unnamed 19-year-old man	2 (including the perpetrator)	0	A 19-year-old man broke into a school in Nakhodka and made his way to the principal's office, where he killed his 15-year-old ex-lover before killing himself.
5 September 2017	Ivanteevka, Moscow Oblast	Mikhail Sergeyevich Pivnev	0	4 (3 indirectly)	2017 Ivanteyevka school attack: A teacher was hit in the head with a meat cleaver and shot in the face with an air rifle by a 15-year-old student who threatened other classmates, causing three other students, two girls and a boy, to jump out of the window and injure themselves before the suspect was arrested.
1 November 2017	Moscow	Andrei Emelyannikov	2 (including the perpetrator)	0	2017 Moscow college attack: An 18-year-old student killed his homeroom teacher with a knife at a Moscow polytechnic college before killing himself with a circular saw.
18 December 2017	Irkutsk, Irkutsk Oblast	Unnamed student	1	0	A 16-year-old student stabbed his 15-year-old classmate to death at School N°4.
15 January 2018	Motovilikhinsky, Perm Krai	Aleksandr Sergeyevich Buslidze Lev Romanovich Bidzhakov	0	15 (including the two perpetrators)	2018 Perm school stabbing: Two young men attacked classmates and a teacher with knives, before attempting suicide, injuring themselves.
17 January 2018	Chelyabinsk, Chelyabinsk Oblast	Unnamed student	0	1	A 16-year-old student attacked his classmate with a knife after a fight.
19 January 2018	Ulan-Ude, Buryatia Republic	Anton Bichivin	0	7 (including the perpetrator)	A ninth-grade student attacked five students and a teacher with an axe before throwing himself from a second-floor building and stabbing himself until he was restrained by police who took him to hospital in serious condition.
21 March 2018	Shadrinsk, Kurgan Oblast	Anna Kargapolova Natalya Kabakova	0	7	Two 13-year-old cousins locked themselves in a classroom and injured 7 students at School N°15. One of them fired shots from a pneumatic pistol, while the other stopped the victims from escaping with a knife. The attackers were restrained by a teacher, who managed to enter the room.
18 April 2018	Sterlitamak, Bashkortostan Republic	Artyom Tagirov	0	4 (including the perpetrator)	A 17-year-old seventh-grade student armed himself with a knife and attacked two classmates in a classroom. The first victim suffered a cut on his forearm and then jumped out of the window to escape, suffering fractures. The second victim suffered a chest injury, and a 29-year-old teacher who tried to calm the suspect was injured before the suspect attempted suicide by stabbing himself.
10 May 2018	Barabinsk, Novosibirsk Oblast	Ilya Ivanistov	1 (the perpetrator)	3	Ilya Ivanistov, a 16-year-old student at a college in Barabinsk, shot a student with a double-barreled shotgun and then killed himself. Two other students were injured by jumping out of a window to escape the shooter.
17 October 2018	Kerch	Vladislav Igorevich Roslyakov	21 (including the perpetrator)	73	Kerch Polytechnic College massacre: A school shooting and a bomb attack committed by an 18-year-old fourth-year student.
25 January 2019	Abalakovo, Krasnoyarsk Krai	Unnamed 9th grade student	0	0	A ninth-grader tried to shoot his classmate with a shotgun, but after he disappeared, the gunman began shooting at the school windows. The shooter was detained; he turned out to be a student in a special education class. There were no casualties.
13 May 2019	Kazan, Tatarstan	Iskander Khalfin	0	1 (indirectly)	A 17-year-old student armed with a BB gun took four teachers and 12 classmates hostage before being arrested. One teacher suffered heart problems and was taken to the hospital, even though she was not directly injured in the hostage crisis.
28 May 2019	Volsk, Saratov Oblast	Daniil Pulkin	0	1	2019 Volsk school attack: A 15-year-old seventh-grader attempted to set his classroom on fire with a Molotov cocktail but failed and then went into the hallway where he attacked a 12-year-old girl with an axe to the head, leaving her in a moderate condition, before fleeing home and being later arrested by police.
31 October 2019	Narian-Mar, Nenetsia	Denis Pozdeev	1	0	A 36-year-old man entered into a kindergarten and stabbed a 6-year-old boy to death during quiet hours, before being arrested and later taken into compulsory treatment.
14 November 2019	Blagoveshchensk, Amur Oblast	Daniil Viktorovich Zasorin	2 (including the perpetrator)	3	Blagoveshchensk college shooting: The student, Daniil Zasorin, 19, opened fire with an IZH-81 shotgun. The criminal also began shooting in the direction of the police, who responded, wounding the shooter. Zasorin then shot and killed himself.
26 February 2020	Ulyanovsk, Ulyanovsk Oblast	Unnamed 8th grade student	0	1	A 15-year-old student stabbed his algebra teacher in the stomach before being arrested. The student is being treated in a compulsive treatment center.
16 February 2021	Novosibirsk, Novosibirsk Oblast	Denis Miller	1	0	A 22-year-old student attacked his fellow student, Denis Gubarev, 26, in front of Novosibirsk State Technical University with a knife before being arrested.
11 May 2021	Kazan, Tatarstan	Ilnaz Rinatovich Galyaviev	9	23	Kazan school bombing and shooting: 19-year-old Ilnaz Galyaviev killed seven students and two teachers in Gymnasium N°175 and injured 23 others before surrendering to the police.
21 May 2021	Berezniki, Perm Krai	Roman Dolbeev	0	1	A 17-year-old tenth grade student attacked his 74-year-old teacher in the neck before being restrained by a school security guard. The teacher managed to survive the attack despite being wounded in the neck. The perpetrator was declared insane and in January 2022 was sent to compulsory psychiatric treatment.
20 September 2021	Perm, Perm Krai	Timur Maratovich Bekmansurov	6	41 (including the perpetrator)	Perm State University shooting: A mass shooting committed by an 18-year-old student.
18 October 2021	Oktyabrsky District, Perm Krai	Unnamed 6th grade student	0	1	A sixth-grader brought a gun into his school and fired two shots at a wall and a fiberglass door. An 11-year-old student was injured by shards of broken glass. The school principal convinced the shooter to give her the gun, after which the gunman was detained.
13 December 2021	Serpukhov, Moscow Oblast	Vladislav Andreevich Struzhenkov	0	13 (including the perpetrator)	An 18-year-old man detonated a bomb at a school in Serpukhov, seriously injuring himself and 12 others, one of them moderately. The man was taken to hospital, survived and the following year was sentenced to 13 years imprisonment.
28 March 2022	Krasnoyarsk, Krasnoyarsk Krai	Polina Platonovna Dvorkina	1 (at the perpetrator’s home)	0	Krasnoyarsk kindergarten shooting: A 19-year-old woman, after killing her father at home as a result of a quarrel, came to Krasnoyarsk kindergarten N°31 at about 2 p.m. with a shotgun hidden under her outerwear, where she intended, as it later turned out, to commit a mass murder of boys, but was disarmed by one of the kindergarten employees, after which she was detained. In July 2023, Dvorkina was sentenced to 17 years in prison.
26 April 2022	Veshkayma, Ulyanovsk Oblast	Ruslan Rushanovich Akhtyamov	5 (including the perpetrator)	1	Veshkayma kindergarten shooting: Three people were murdered at the kindergarten before the 26-year-old shooter also killed himself. He had also killed the owner of the gun earlier on the same day.
26 September 2022	Izhevsk, Udmurt Republic	Artyom Igorevich Kazantsev	19 (including the perpetrator)	23	Izhevsk school shooting: 34-year-old Artyom Kazantsev opened fire at his former school before killing himself.
7 February 2023	Khimki, Moscow Oblast	Melvira	0	1	A fifth grader stabbed her classmate in the boys' bathroom with a knife. The victim was struck between 46 and 100 times, with 5 of the stabs being deep. Despite the loss of blood, the victim miraculously survived the attack that occurred at School N°10.
13 April 2023	Saint Petersburg	Unnamed 9th grade student	0	4	A ninth-grader armed with a Borner PM-X air pistol injured four students at a school in St. Petersburg. The four injured were not seriously injured.
11 September 2023	Krasny Desant, Rostov Oblast	Grigory Belyaev	0	4	A masked 15-year-old student armed with his grandmother's knife went to his school around 7:50 a.m. After threatening a staff member, the suspect attacked four adults with the weapon, among the injured were three staff members and a student's grandfather. Before the suspect was arrested.
17 October 2023	Izhevsk, Udmurtia	Unnamed student	0	1	A 14-year-old student with schizophrenia stabbed a classmate three times.
7 December 2023	Bryansk, Bryansk Oblast	Alina Dmitrievna Afanaskina	2 (including the perpetrator)	5	Bryansk school shooting: an eighth-grader girl shot a classmate dead and injured five people before shooting herself in a school.
26 February 2024	Moscow	Unnamed 4th grade student	0	2 (including the perpetrator)	A student who had been dumped by a boy, who was her boyfriend, attacked a friend who was also dating him, before trying to kill herself at the Russian State Humanitarian University.
16 September 2024	Chelyabinsk, Chelyabinsk Oblast	Roman Gizatulin	0	5 (including the perpetrator)	A 13-year-old student, armed with a knife, a hammer and a BB gun, attacked and injured three classmates with the hammer. A 57-year-old teacher who tried to protect her students was lightly hit before the suspect attempted suicide, but survived and was arrested.
23 September 2024	Balagansk, Irkutsk Oblast	Artyom Belov	0	3	During recess, an eighth-grade student armed with a knife and a hammer hit a classmate in the back of the head, and two other students were hit in the hands with hammers, before being restrained by the physical education teacher.
6 December 2024	Krasnodar, Krasnodar Krai	Unnamed 8th grade student	0	7	A fight at a school in Krasnodar escalated into a stabbing. A 14-year-old student stabbed and seriously injured two students and cut five others. After the attack, the student fled but was soon detained. The attack occurred as students were entering their classrooms.
11 March 2025	Niznhy Novgorod, Niznhy Novgorod Oblast	Unnamed 8th grade student	0	2	A student armed with a knife lightly attacked two classmates with a knife, one of the victims was stabbed in the neck and the other in the stomach, the attack occurred at a School N°117.
7 April 2025	Novy Urengoy, Yamalo-Nenets Autonomous Okrug	Unnamed	0	1	A security guard was injured in a school stabbing.
17 April 2025	Mirnyi, Moscow Oblast	13-year-old boy	0	1	A 13-year-old sixth-grade student attacked a teacher with a hammer during a lesson.
29 September 2025	Arkhangelsk	Artemy Koryukov	0	3 (including the perpetrator)	A former student attacked college workers in Arkhangelsk with a knife. The young man was neutralized by other students.
15 December 2025	Saint Petersburg	Ninth-grade student	0	2 (including the perpetrator)	A student attacked a teacher with a knife at School No. 191. After that, the attacker harmed himself.
16 December 2025	Odintsovo, Moscow Oblast	Timofey Vladimirovich Kulyamov	1	4 (including the perpetrator)	2025 Odintsovo school attack: A student attacked a security guard with pepper spray and a knife and then stabbed a 10-year-old schoolboy to death.
16 January 2026	Voronezh, Voronezh Oblast	6th-grade student	0	0	A 6th grade student entered the school with a knife & swung it around trying to intimidate & attack the students & staff alike. She and her mother have been arrested.
22 January 2026	Nizhnekamsk, Tatarstan	Danis Razov	0	2 (including the perpetrator)	A 13-year-old student attacked students with a knife and set off firecrackers, then injured himself.
3 February 2026	Kodinsk, Krasnoyarsk Krai	14-year-old female student	0	1	A 14-year-old bullied student with a knife attacked a teacher and wounded another student.
3 February 2026	Ufa, Bashkortostan	Vadim Imaev	0	1	A student with an air rifle shot at a teacher and three other students, slightly wounding the teacher, and detonated a firecracker.
4 February 2026	Krasnoyarsk, Krasnoyarsk Krai	Vladislava Nikolaeva	0	7 (including the perpetrator)	A girl started a fire in a school lavatory before hitting other students with a hammer and setting them on fire. Six people sustained injuries after being burned or hit with the hammer.
5 February 2026	Buguruslan, Orenburg Oblast	Unnamed 25-year-old man	0	1	A drunk 25-year-old man kicked in the door and entered a kindergarten building armed with a knife. The teacher Liya Galeeva stepped in the attacker's path, detained him, and helped protect the children. The teacher sustained cuts and received medical attention. The children were not injured.
7 February 2026	Ufa, Bashkortostan	Alexander S.	0	7 (including the perpetrator)	Bashkir State Medical University attack: A 15-year-old with a knife went into a dormitory at the Bashkir State Medical University and began stabbing people. Seven people were injured, including the attacker with self-inflicted wounds.
11 February 2026	Anapa, Krasnodar Krai	Ilya Alekseyevich Orda	1	2	2026 Anapa college shooting: A 17-year-old student at Anapa Technical College shot and killed a security guard and wounded two other people.
19 February 2026	Alexandrovsk, Perm Krai	13-year-old male seventh-grade student	0	1	A 13-year-old seventh-grader stabbed a peer. The injured boy sustained severe injuries, an air ambulance from Perm was deployed to save him, and the child was evacuated to a hospital in the city of Berezniki.
26 March 2026	Chelyabinsk, Chelyabinsk Oblast	Artyom Kutlubaev	0	5 (including the perpetrator)	2026 Chelyabinsk school attack: A ninth-grade student armed with a plastic crossbow, pepper spray, and a flare gun attacked his school. After spraying three teachers and shooting a classmate, the attacker jumped out of the window of the fourth floor.
1 April 2026	Zaikovo Village, Sverdlovsk Oblast	Unnamed 13-year-old male sixth-grade student	0	3	A 13-year-old boy brought an air pistol to school, injuring a girl, a teacher, and the accountant who held him until security arrived.
7 April 2026	Dobryanka, Perm Krai	Maxim	1	0	2026 Dobryanka school stabbing: The attack occurred in the morning at the entrance to school No. 5. A 17-year-old student stabbed his homeroom teacher. The victim, Olesya Petrovna Baguta, later died in the hospital.
29 April 2026	Moscow	Unnamed female fourth-grader	0	1	A girl brought a kitchen knife from home and injured a teacher with it.
12 May 2026	Gulkevichi, Krasnodar Krai	Unnamed 16-year-old male ninth-grade student	0	2	A 16-year-old student brought an air gun to school. Two students were injured in the shooting.
1 September 2026	Kansk, Krasnoyarsk Krai	Darya	0	7	A 13-year-old seventh-grade student sprayed pepper spray into teachers' faces, attacked them with a knife, and set fire to a door on the school's third floor by throwing a bottle containing an incendiary mixture. The attack was halted by the mother of one of the students, who pushed the girl out of the classroom.
2 September 2026	New Moscow, Moscow	Eight-grade student	0	1	At School No. 1392 named after D. V. Ryabinkin, a student attacked a teacher with a knife.
2 September 2026	Kushnarenkovo, Bashkortostan	Ninth-grade student	0	1	A student injured a classmate with a knife following a conflict.

== See also ==
- List of mass shootings in Russia
- Lists of school-related attacks
