= Kerch Polytechnic College massacre =

2018 school shooting in Crimea

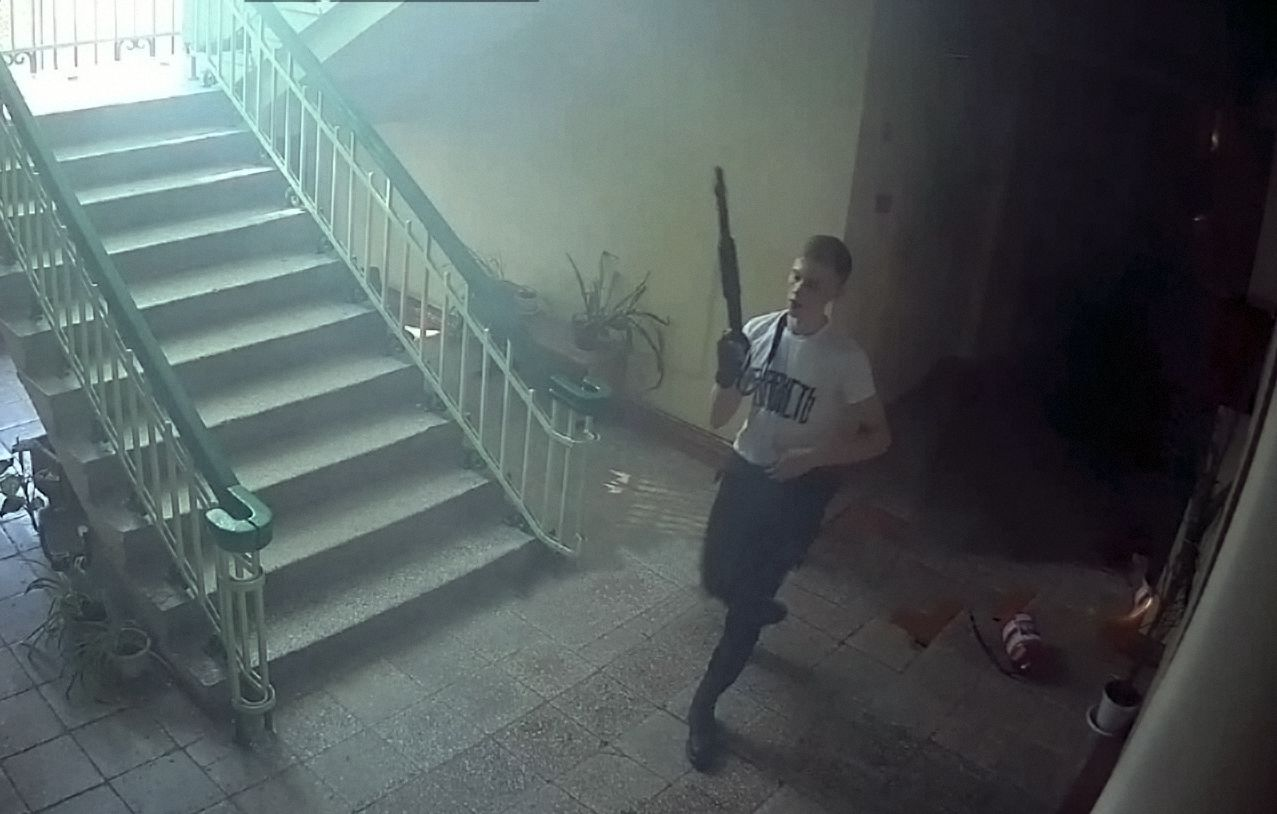
- Roslyakov seen on camera holding his shotgun.
- Native name: Массовое убийство в Керченском политехническом колледже
- Location: 45°21′23″N 36°32′08″E; Kerch Polytechnic College, Kerch, Crimea: Russia (de facto); Ukraine (de jure)
- Date: 17 October 2018; 8 years ago
- Target: Students and staff
- Attack type: School shooting; school bombing; murder–suicide; mass murder; mass shooting
- Weapons: 12-gauge Hatsan Escort Aimguard pump-action shotgun (with pistol grip); Nail bomb; Smoke grenades; Knife (unused); Pipe bombs (unused); Molotov cocktail (unused)
- Deaths: 21 (including the perpetrator)
- Injuries: 73
- Perpetrator: Vladislav Roslyakov
- Motive: Undetermined. Possibly depression, social protest and alleged bullying (according to the Chairman of Investigative Committee)

On 17 October 2018, a school shooting and bombing occurred at the Kerch Polytechnic College in Kerch, Crimea. The perpetrator, 18-year-old student Vladislav Roslyakov, killed 20 people and wounded 73 others before killing himself. It was the deadliest school shooting in Russia or Ukraine since the 2004 Beslan school siege.

== Incident ==
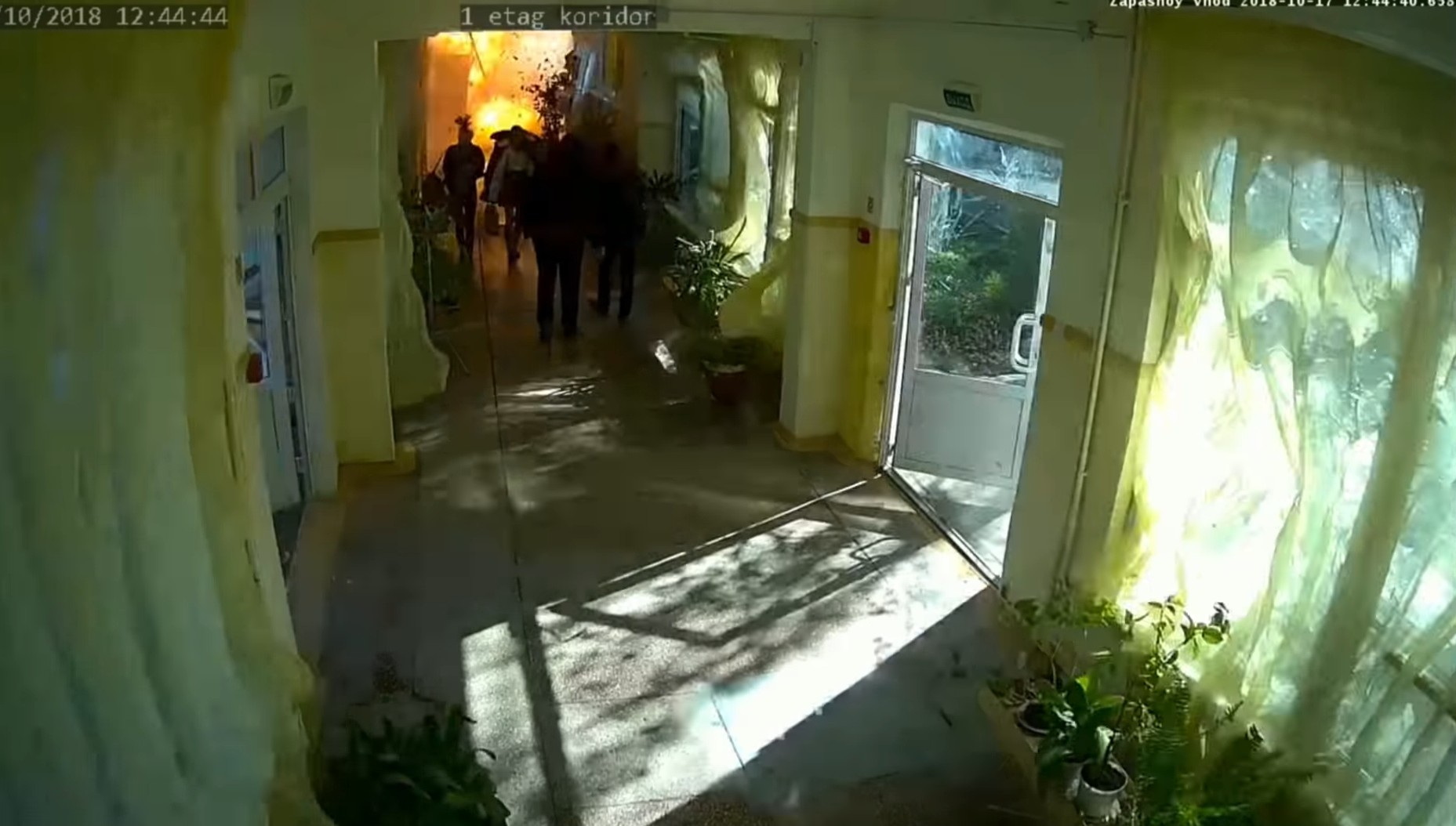
Bomb explosion in the dining room

The perpetrator purchased a shotgun legally and later bought 150 rounds at the Sokol (Сокол) gun store on 13 October 2018. He entered the building of Kerch Polytechnic College on 17 October 2018 at about 10:02 a.m. A survivor of the massacre said that the shooting lasted for more than 15 minutes.

Multiple witnesses recounted the gunman strolling through the corridors of the Polytechnic College, firing shots indiscriminately at students and staff. At least 30 shots were fired during the massacre. He also fired at computer monitors, locked doors, and fire extinguishers. A large nail bomb was detonated during the attack, and local police said that they deactivated more explosives on the campus. It has not been made clear who died from the bombing and who died from the shooting.

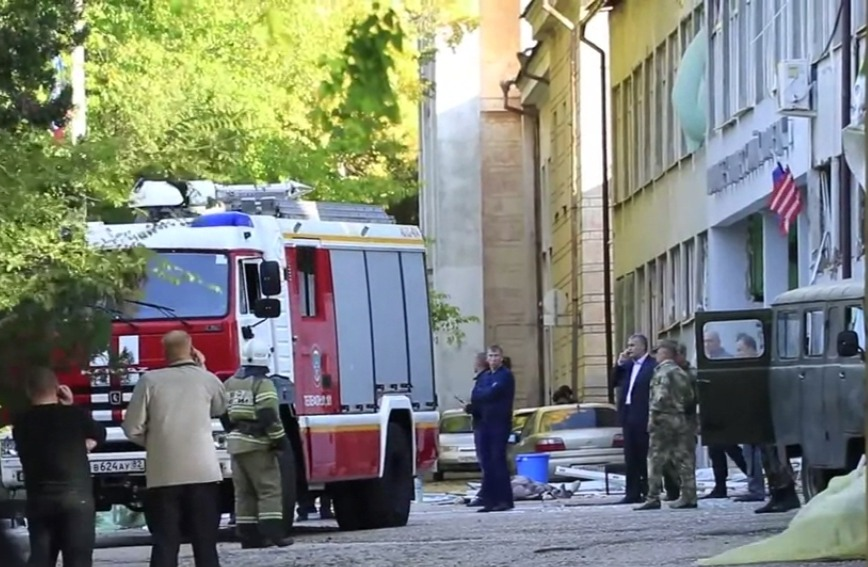
Emergency services respond to the massacre

CNN reported that state television channel Russia-24 said that 200 military personnel had been sent to the location. Eyewitness accounts differ about the time it took for law enforcement to respond; between 10 and 15 minutes even though a police station is across the street, within 300 metres (980 ft) of the college. The massacre ended when the gunman committed suicide in the college's library. Graphic video footage of the attack was captured by college’s surveillance cameras and later posted on both the news programme Vesti.Krym's YouTube channel and on its website. This footage was removed from both sites shortly afterwards. There was initial variation in survivors' accounts of the incident, with some claiming that a large bomb exploded and others describing only gunfire and the use of grenades.

== Victims ==
Fatalities

Students:

- Ksenia Boldina (17)
- Vladislav Verdibozhenko (15)
- Victoria Demchuk (16)
- Ruden Juraev (16)
- Anna Zhuravlyova (19)
- Alina Kerova (16)
- Alexey Lavrinovich (19) – Roslyakov's college classmate
- Egor Perepyolkin (19)
- Vladislav Lazarev (19)
- Ruslan Lysenko (17)
- Roman Karymov (21)
- Daniil Pipenko (16)
- Sergey Stepanenko (15)
- Nikita Florensky (16)
- Daria Chegerest (16)

Staff:

- Anastasia Baklanova (26) – head of Information and Career Guidance Work;
- Svetlana Baklanova (57) – deputy Director of the College for Academic Affairs, mathematics teacher, mother of the deceased Anastasia Baklanova;
- Larisa Kudryavtseva (62) – head of the Department of Chemical-Engineering and Mechanical Disciplines of the College;
- Alexander Moiseenko (46) – computer science teacher, Roslyakov's college group curator;
- Lyudmila Ustenko (65) – secretary.

Russia's National Anti-Terrorism Committee reported that most of the victims were teenagers. Fifteen students and five staff members died.

The Russian Health Minister Veronika Skvortsova told reporters that a total of 67 people were wounded, 10 of whom were described as being in a "critical" condition, including five in comas.

Crimean State Council speaker Vladimir Konstantinov announced that the victims' families would receive financial compensation, with preliminary discussions suggesting that the payments would be 1 million rubles (USD 11734.2) from the Russian federal budget and 1 million rubles from the local budget.

In the fall of 2019, the media reported that another name had been added to the list of victims of the shooting: nine months after the attack, 61-year-old Olga Nikolaevna Grishchenko, who taught economics at the college, died. The woman survived the massacre, but suffered multiple gunshot injuries to her abdomen and underwent a series of surgeries. However, the Ministry of Education, Science, and Youth of the Republic of Crimea stated that Grishchenko's death was not directly related to her injuries and urged people not to link her death to the attack on the college.

== Perpetrator ==
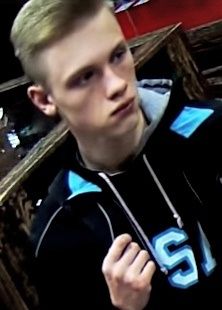
Roslyakov in the "Sokol" gun store, four days before the attack

The attack was perpetrated by a fourth-year student of the college, Vladislav Igorevich Roslyakov (Russian: Владисла́в И́горевич Росляко́в; 2 May 2000 – 17 October 2018). He was 18 years old at the time of the massacre.

When Roslyakov was around ten years old, his parents broke up when his father sustained a severe head injury, after which he became disabled, started drinking alcohol, and abused Roslyakov, his mother, and other relatives. Roslyakov studied at a local school with no interest and poor grades. He had few friends, and his hobbies included weapons and video games. In 2015 he went to college to become an electrician. In college, he developed an interest in explosives and weapons and started to take a knife bayonet to class. One day he discharged pepper spray in a class and failed to explain his actions. His mother, a Jehovah's Witness, limited his social activity, searched his pockets, and refused to allow him to go to the cinema or use a computer, only allowing the latter when he turned 16.

In the days leading up to the attack, Roslyakov stated that he did not believe in the afterlife. On the eve of the attack, according to neighbours, Roslyakov burned a Bible in which he had highlighted verses, along with his mobile phone and other books.

A friend has claimed that Roslyakov "hated the polytechnic very much" and had vowed revenge on his teachers. There were also reports that he may have been bullied. On social media in the days before the attack, he discussed ignorance by others, the lack of purpose in his life, mass shootings, and suicide. Since approximately 2016, Roslyakov was in a number of online communities dedicated to serial and mass killers.

Surveillance footage of the incident shows Roslyakov wearing black trousers and a white T-shirt emblazoned with the Russian word "НЕНАВИСТЬ" (lit. 'HATRED') as he carries an eight-shot (7+1) 12-gauge Hatsan Escort Aimguard pump-action shotgun with a pistol grip. His clothing resembled that of Eric Harris, one of the perpetrators of the 1999 Columbine High School massacre, leading to speculation that the massacre was a copycat crime. According to some Russian tabloids, he had been a member of various Dylan Klebold and Eric Harris fan clubs on social networks and had informed friends of his belief that "it would be good to have a massacre", specifically referencing the Columbine High School massacre as an example. Furthermore, he had mentioned his belief in the two perpetrators being "awesome" and reposted material related to Columbine. Like perpetrator Eric Harris, Roslyakov committed suicide near the bookshelf in the library of the college by shooting himself in the mouth with his shotgun.

== Investigation ==
Russia's Investigative Committee initially classified the attack as terrorism but later changed it to "murder of two or more persons, committed in a generally dangerous way" and "illegal acquisition, transfer, sale, storage, transportation, or carrying of explosives or explosive devices". After the first reports of an alleged terrorist attack in Kerch, many Russian politicians and mass media suggested that the events were the activities of "Ukrainian saboteurs" and that the Ukrainian government was responsible; they changed their views after more information emerged, while others questioned whether Roslyakov was sufficiently checked before being allowed to purchase a gun and ammunition, which Roslyakov legally did.

In the days immediately following the massacre, investigators researched Roslyakov's background in an attempt to establish his precise motive. These investigators also revealed that, ultimately, they were treating the incident as a calculated school shooting. Officials are investigating concerns in the case, such as where Roslyakov got the 30,000–40,000 rubles (US$480–640) for the weapon and where he learned to use those weapons. It was discovered that Roslyakov obtained a weapon permit in 2018 and owned the gun legally, after completing legally required training on weapon security and presenting all required documents, including a medical report. He periodically attended a shooting club. Shortly before the shooting, he legally purchased 150 rounds of ammunition.

The Investigative Committee ordered a psychiatric evaluation of Roslyakov postmortem. Crimean Prime Minister Sergey Aksyonov stated on 18 October that the perpetrator might have had an accomplice, and police were searching for the individual "who was coaching" Roslyakov for the crime. However, on 9 November 2018, the Investigative Committee came to the conclusion that Roslyakov had acted alone.

== Aftermath ==
Students returned to studies on 23 October, with checkpoints at the entrances at which the students' identities were confirmed. A spokesperson for the Rostov Region Directorate of the Russian Emergency Ministry told reporters: "An examination has been carried out. According to the preliminary information, there is no danger of [the building's] collapse."

=== Hacking of the perpetrator's VKontakte page ===
On the night of 4 November 2018, the deleted VK page of Roslyakov, under the name "Anatoly Smirnov", was hacked. The alleged criminal's correspondences was posted online, and the contents of the page (subscriptions, saved photos, saved music, etc.) became available for viewing by anyone. In the correspondences, Roslyakov, among other things, complained about the lack of understanding from his peers, wrote about his unwillingness to live, and also that his parents "decided everything for him", said that he hated his college, and wrote that he would "arrange a great graduation" for himself.

=== Copycats and inspired incidents ===
- On 28 May 2019, a 15-year-old student named Daniil Pulkin, obsessed with Roslyakov, committed an attack on his school with an axe and Molotov cocktails in Volsk, Saratov oblast, Russia, which left a girl seriously wounded. In August 2020, he was sentenced to seven years in prison in a juvenile hall.
- On October 27, 2019, 18-year-old Boris Banin was detained in Zaraysk, Moscow Oblast. Investigators determined that the man was a "fan" of Vladislav Roslyakov and a member of an online social media group dedicated to the "Kerch shooter". He had been planning a mass shooting at his technical college in Lukhovitsy for a year, was in possession of a firearm (a Makarov pistol), intended to make an explosive device, and was seeking accomplices for the planned attack. It was also discovered that the perpetrator was also a "fan" of the Islamic State and, as he told his acquaintances, allegedly intended to "go fight in Syria at the first opportunity". Students repeatedly complained about him "watching videos of IS militants executing people" during classes, but the college administration did not expel him. In 2020, Banin was sentenced to 6 years imprisonment.
- According to the FSB, on 18 February 2020 two of "Roslyakov's followers", born in 2003 and 2004, were detained in Kerch. According to convictions, the teenagers, who were students at a local school and college, were preparing an attack on their educational institutions using homemade explosive devices, which they tested on animals. In November 2021 the older teen was sentenced to 4 years in prison, and the younger to 7 years.
- 18-year-old Daniil Monakhov, who committed quadruple murder in the village near Nizhny Novgorod on 12 October 2020, was inspired by the Kerch massacre, according to Investigative Committee, which called Monakhov "Roslyakov's follower". He also acquired and used a Hatsan Escort shotgun for the crime, the same brand as Roslyakov had (but a different model).
- According to Investigative Committee of Russia, Ilnaz Galyaviev, who committed an armed attack on a Kazan gymnasium in May 2021, "copied the actions of Vladislav Roslyakov" and other members of "destructive subculture".
- The perpetrator of the Annunciation Catholic Church shooting posted a video that showed a magazine that listed the names of six mass shooters, including Vladislav Roslyakov.
- The perpetrator of the Jakarta school bombing, Muhammed Nazriel Fadhel Hidayat, was wearing a T-shirt with the word "НЕНАВИСТЬ" and also wrote the name of the Kerch shooter on his airsoft guns, among the names of some other mass killers. Nazriel detonated a bomb at the congregational Friday prayer, injuring 96 students, including himself, who slipped and fell from the roof while attempting to flee the scene.
- On 11 February 2026, a 17-year-old student opened fire at his college, killing a security guard and wounding two other people in Anapa, Krasnodar Krai. He failed to enter the college because the security guard managed to block the entrance before being killed. The shooter was detained at the scene. Before the attack, he posted photos and videos of criminals who had previously attacked educational institutions, including Vladislav Roslyakov, on his social media.
- On 2 February 2026, the Philippine National Police Anti-Cybercrime Group foiled a school attack plan in Calabarzon and rescued several students and one Facebook User named "R.A.H". One of the confiscated shirts had "НЕНАВИСТЬ" and "Natural Selection" written on it. In response to the foiled school attack, the CICC issued a 30-day ultimatum stating that if Roblox failed to comply with child protection laws, the platform could be blocked.

== Reactions ==
Crimean Prime Minister Sergey Aksyonov announced that there would be four days of mourning. Crimean State Council speaker Vladimir Konstantinov said that it was impossible to conceive that 18-year-old perpetrator Vladislav Roslyakov had prepared the attack by himself, saying, "On the ground, he acted alone, that is already known and established, but in my opinion and in the opinion of my colleagues this reprobate could not have carried out the preparations".

Sergei Mikhailovich Smirnov, deputy head of Russia's Federal Security Service (FSB), said the security services needed to have greater control over the Internet. Russian political analyst Sergey Mikheyev on Russian state TV blamed the attack on "Western subculture", claiming that it "builds its matrix on the cult of violence ... the one who has a weapon in his hands is right. This is a purely American approach to the matter". Russian President Vladimir Putin said at the Valdai Discussion Club in Sochi that the attack appeared to be the result of globalisation, social media, and the Internet, and that "everything started with the tragic events in schools in the US ... we're not creating healthy (Internet) content for young people ... which leads to tragedies of this kind". Some saw the remarks as Russians blaming the West for the attack and a linkage with his past as head of the Kremlin and FSB before becoming president, which The Irish Times said are "suspicious of the internet and social media, seeing them as Western-dominated technologies that can be used to stir up dissent and street protests".

Leaders of several countries expressed their condolences to the victims of the attack, including Armenia, Estonia, Finland, Germany, Italy, Thailand, the United Kingdom, and Venezuela. Ukrainian President Petro Poroshenko expressed condolences to the victims, whom he described as Ukrainian citizens, stating that the Prosecutor General's Office of the Autonomous Republic of Crimea had initiated criminal proceedings under the article "Act of terrorism". (Note: Ukraine does not recognise the March 2014 annexation of Crimea by Russia and sees Crimea as its territory.) The Secretary General of the Council of Europe, Thorbjørn Jagland, and the Secretary-General of the United Nations, António Guterres, also expressed condolences.

Some newspapers described the attack as "Russia's Columbine", a reference to the 1999 US high school massacre. Steven Rosenberg said the attack should not be surprising, as he noted there had already been five attacks in schools in Russia in 2018 where a number of children were injured. A Telegraph article also claimed there had been half a dozen school attacks in Russia in 2018, although claiming the previous incidents involved knives and traumatic pistols rather than high-powered firearms.

== Memorials ==
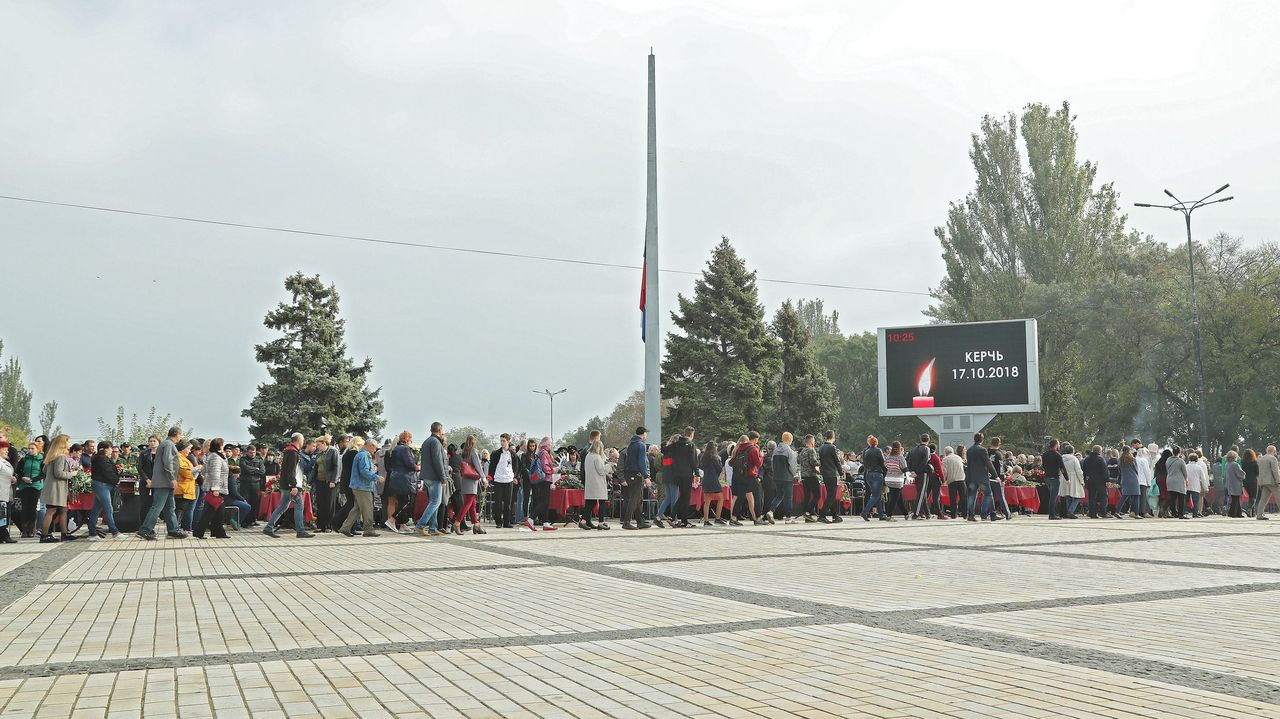
A procession of mourners attend a memorial to the victims on 19 October

Throughout Russia and other countries, hundreds of people gathered for memorials for the victims. In Moscow, the memorial of Kerch in the Alexander Garden was decorated with flowers. A makeshift memorial was created outside of the college for residents and survivors to bring flowers and toys.

An open memorial and funeral for the victims were held in the central square of Kerch, with a speech by Sergey Aksyonov, who told the crowd, "We don't want to talk, we want to weep. The history of Crimea will be divided in two—before and after 17 October. We need to be strong we need to be brave." Around 20,000 people were estimated to have attended the public funeral in Kerch.

== See also ==
- Columbine effect
- List of attacks related to post-secondary schools
- List of mass shootings in Russia
- List of school attacks in Russia
- List of school massacres by death toll

=== Other Russian school shooting incidents ===
- 2026 Anapa college shooting
- Bryansk school shooting
- Izhevsk school shooting
- Veshkayma kindergarten shooting
- Krasnoyarsk kindergarten shooting
- Perm State University shooting
- Kazan school shooting
- Blagoveshchensk college shooting
- Barabinsk college shooting
- 2014 Moscow school shooting
- Beslan school hostage crisis
- Kamyshin school massacre
