= 2026 Chelyabinsk school attack =

School attack in Russia

Coordinates: 55.10678105981911°N 61.48555061667477°E

- Location: Novorossiyskaya Street, 27, Chelyabinsk, Chelyabinsk Oblast, Russia
- Date: 26 March 2026; 7 months ago
- Target: Students and staff
- Attack type: School violence
- Weapons: Flare gun; Pepper spray; Plastic crossbow (unused)
- Deaths: 0
- Injuries: 5 (including the suspect)
- Motive: Under investigation (likely jealousy)
- Accused: 15-year-old student

On 26 March 2026, a school attack took place at Secondary School No. 32 in Chelyabinsk, Chelyabinsk Oblast, Russia. A 15-year-old male student entered the school with a flare gun, pepper spray, and a plastic crossbow. Three teachers were sprayed with pepper spray, and a girl was shot with a flare gun. After the attack, the attacker fell from the fourth floor while attempting to escape. No deaths were reported.

Russian law enforcement has opened three criminal cases: attempted murder of two or more people, negligence, and providing services that do not meet safety requirements.

== Background ==
Secondary School No. 32 is located in the Leninsky District of Chelyabinsk. The school was built in 1958. More than a thousand students study there, and classes are held in two shifts. Students study the core school curriculum and can balso attend extra-curricular clubs and sports activities.

The attack occurred amid a recent series of school attacks across Russia.

A few weeks ago, before the incident, a 17-year-old fatally shot a security guard at the Anapa Technical College in Anapa, Krasnodar Krai.

In 2024, in the same city, a 13-year-old attacked a school with a hammer. Four people were injured.

== Attack ==
On 26 March 2026, the security scanner at Secondary School No. 32 was not working. That morning, before the attack, the attacker went into the school toilet and stayed there for a long time. A biology teacher and a girls' DT teacher went to check on him. When the boy opened the door, he sprayed them with pepper spray.

The teenager then headed to his classroom on the third floor, where a lesson was going on. He burst into the room. Sources reported that the boy sprayed pepper spray in the classroom and shot a female classmate with a flare gun.

After that, the teenager ran out of the classroom, sprayed more teachers with pepper spray in the corridor, went up another floor and tried to escape through a fourth-floor window, but fell.

After the incident, police patrols on duty and juvenile liaison officers headed to the scene.

== Reactions and aftermath ==
=== State Duma's reaction ===
Nina Ostanina, Head of the State Duma Committee on Protection of the Family, Paternity, Maternity and Childhood, commented on the Chelyabinsk school attack. She said that children attacking Russian schools happens because they are not being raised in the spirit of collectivism and respect for others.

Ostanina also said that aggression is the quickest way for students to get noticed, which is why it is essential to provide children with psychological support in schools.

According to Ostanina, school security needs to be stepped up, but efforts to improve safety must be systemic.

=== Criminal cases ===
The Investigative Committee of Russia has opened three criminal cases: attempted murder of two or more people (Article 30, Part 3, and Article 105, Part 2, Paragraph "a" of the Criminal Code of the Russian Federation), negligence (Article 293, Part 1 of the Criminal Code of the Russian Federation), and providing services that do not meet safety requirements (Article 238, Part 1 of the Criminal Code of the Russian Federation).

== Suspect ==
The suspect was a 15-year-old male ninth-grade student. He was quiet and got bad grades at school. He had no friends in the class, and he didn't get into conflicts with anyone. The boy did karate, played football, and was also interested in chess, winning several prizes in competitions. He planned to go to a local law college. He comes from a stable and supportive family. An eyewitness said that shortly before the incident, the teenager had allegedly been caught using illegal substances.

His personal diary was found. In it, he wrote about his hatred for people. On social media, he posted gaming memes and jokes about hating people.

His late stepfather had given him a plastic crossbow. The teenager had mental health issues due to his relationship with his father. He had been taken to neurologists since childhood. It is also known that he has a 12-year-old sister.

Investigators are not ruling out jealousy as a motive. According to preliminary information, the teenager had a conflict with the injured girl. He actually shared a desk with the girl he attacked.

== Victims ==
Two teenagers, including the suspect, were hospitalised. The suspect has broken legs and blunt abdominal trauma. According to the injured girl’s grandmother, the shot hit her head, just two centimetres from her eye. Their condition is not life-threatening. Three teachers suffered chemical burns to their eyes and faces.

== See also ==
- List of school attacks in Russia
- List of attacks related to secondary schools (2020s)
- 2026 in Russia
