= Izhevsk school shooting =

2022 school shooting in Izhevsk, Udmurtia, Russia

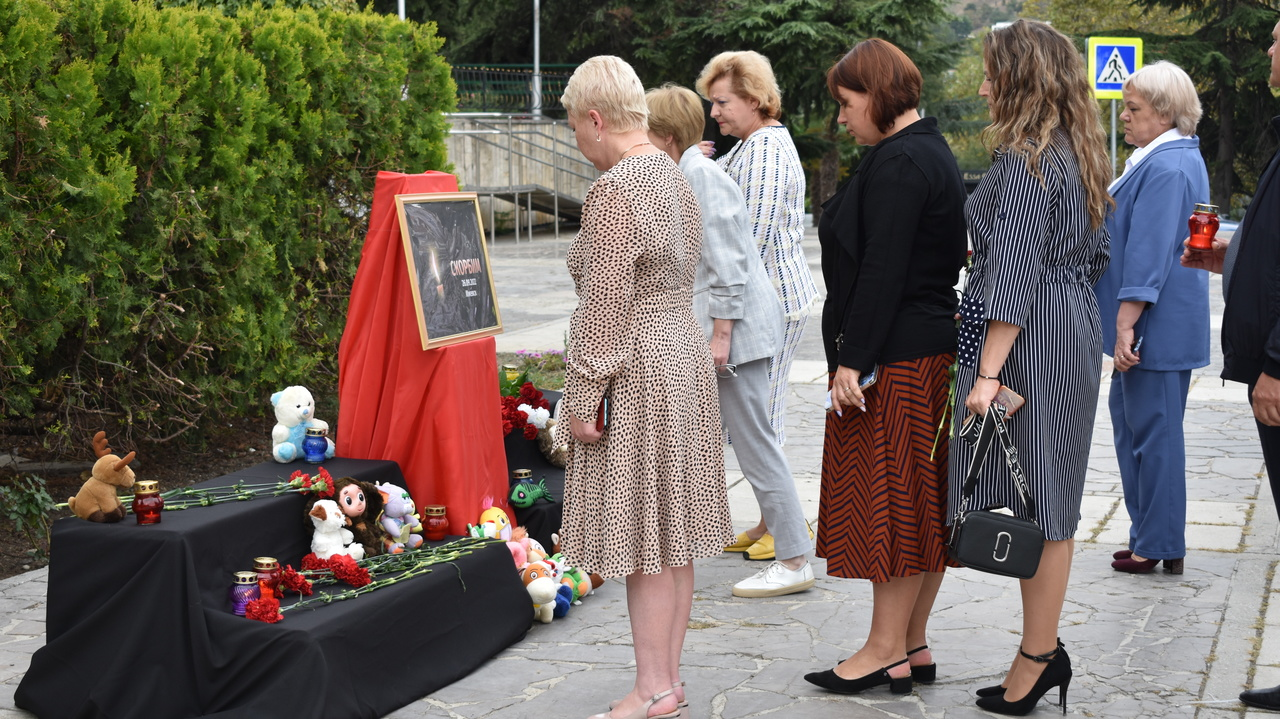
- Shrine for the victims in Alushta
- Location: 56°52′06.7″N 53°12′19.4″E; Pushkinskaya Ulitsa, 285, Izhevsk, Udmurtia, Russia
- Date: 26 September 2022; 4 years ago
- Target: Students and staff at School No. 88
- Attack type: Mass murder; mass shooting; murder–suicide; school shooting; pedicide
- Weapon: Two Makarov traumatic pistols converted to fire live rounds
- Deaths: 19 (including the perpetrator)
- Injuries: 23
- Perpetrator: Artyom Igorevich Kazantsev
- Motive: Misanthropy

On 26 September 2022, a mass shooting occurred at a school in Izhevsk, Udmurtia, Russia. 18 were killed and 23 others were wounded before the gunman, identified as Artyom Kazantsev, committed suicide.

== Events ==
The mass shooting occurred at School No. 88 (Russian: Школа № 88) in Izhevsk, Udmurtia, Russia, at around 10:52 a.m. Armed with two pistols, along with 44 magazines containing 352 rounds of ammunition, the gunman, Artyom Kazantsev, entered the school and opened fire, killing one of the guards and a cloakroom attendant and fatally wounding a cleaner. He then turned right and opened fire at the room in the end of the hallway, killing an art teacher and three first-graders, all aged 7. Kazantsev then came back to the entrance and went to the second floor, killing the second guard who had already reported the shooting and was on his way to warn the teachers on the upper floors.

On the second and the third floors the shooter burst through several classrooms and indiscriminately fired on those inside, killing three students aged 9, 10, and 11, along with a math teacher. According to a third-grader who witnessed the shooting, Kazantsev shouted, "Bastards, where are you?" after leaving a classroom where children were hiding under the desks. The gunman then entered room 403 on the fourth floor, where he killed five students aged 14–15 and an English teacher before committing suicide by shooting himself. Videos of the aftermath were posted by the investigative committee, which included images of the interior of the school and Kazantsev's body lying on the floor of the classroom.

== Victims ==
Victims:

Students:
- Dmitry Buldakov, 7
- Alexander Kivamov, 7
- Arina Urakova, 7
- Kirill Baryshnikov, 9
- Ilya Ovchinnikov, 10
- Eva Knyazeva, 11
- Vladimir Afanasyev, 15
- Vyacheslav Babintsev, 15
- Nikita Ipatov, 14
- Vladislav Mokrushin, 15
- Sofya Osotova, 15

Staff:

- Nikolai Kiselyov, guard, 73
- Rinaz Zamalutdinov, guard, 60
- Lyudmila Fedotova, cleaner, 67
- Gulshat Rafikovа, cloakroom attendant, 40
- Svetlana Sukhanova, art teacher, 53
- Natalya Vedernikova, math teacher, 50
- Margarita Sakharnykh, English teacher, 57

Kazantsev killed 18 people at the school. The victims include eleven students aged 7 to 15, 2 security guards, 3 teachers, a cloakroom attendant and a cleaner. 23 people were wounded, including 22 children. The eighteenth victim, 67-year-old Lyudmila Fedotova, died on 8 November.

Eleven injured children became disabled as a result of the shooting. As of 26 September 2024, one of the victims shot in room 403, 9th grader Robert Burkhanov, remained in critical condition. A bullet that entered the boy's head and exited through his temple left him paralyzed. Two years later, he still had not regained consciousness. On September 26, 2025, it was announced that despite his eyes opening, he is still unconscious, is in palliative care, and according to his mother, the doctors say there is no chance of recovery.

== Investigation ==
Investigators searched Kazantsev's residence and probed reports of his potential neo-fascist and neo-Nazi ideology after reports emerged that he was involved in a neo-fascist organization or group. The weapons used were found to be two PM pistols, specifically less-than-lethal pistols, which were converted to fire live ammunition. It was also braided with key chains honoring Columbine massacre perpetrators, Eric Harris and Dylan Klebold. Many of the magazines had the word "НЕНАВИСТЬ", the Russian word for "hatred," written in red paint on the side, likely referencing the Kerch Polytechnic College massacre, in which the perpetrator wore a white T-shirt with the word on the front.

== Perpetrator ==
Perpetrator Artyom Kazantsev leaves the entrance of his house and heads towards the school with a bag, which probably contained pistols and magazines.

According to the Investigative Committee, the shooter was 34-year-old Artyom Kazantsev (Russian: Артём Казанцев; born 1988), a native of Izhevsk and a former student of the school. It was reported that he was wearing a T-shirt with Nazi symbols and a balaclava. According to the Head of Udmurtia Aleksandr Brechalov, Kazantsev was registered as an outpatient at a mental health facility with a diagnosis of schizophrenia. He began seeking treatment at the clinic since 2011 and had his last psychiatric appointment in mid-September of 2022.

Artyom lived with both his mother and grandmother. According to former classmates, he was quiet and shy as a child, but cheerful and positive. He didn't argue or fight, played soccer, and went to the arcade often. He had been nicknamed "Hedgehog" because of his short spiky hair.

A former classmate of Artyom told MK that she remembers Kazantsev well: "He was quiet and inconspicuous, a bit of a 'suck' guy. We weren't friends with guys like that. There were tough guys in our class, and in 8B, too, and he probably got into trouble with them. We didn't like those weaklings. He wasn't weird, he was a completely normal guy, inconspicuous, calm, and not aggressive".

Kazantsev was brought to trial after a knife attack on two people on 7 December 2008, when he stabbed a teenager he did not know in the back and, 20 minutes later, stabbed a woman in the back and shoulder. The case was heard by a justice of the peace. The forensic psychiatric examination found that the defendant was in a state of insanity at the time of the crimes. The court considered that Kazantsev was not subject to criminal liability, since he committed a crime of minor gravity, causing slight harm to the health of the victims, and in May 2009 issued a decision to close the criminal case and to refuse to apply coercive medical treatment.

Little is known about Artyom's personal life. Neighbors stated that in recent years, he always wore black, grew long nails and hair, was unsociable, and often got into conflicts. He was known to play computer games and among his friends and was considered a "pro" at Counter Strike.

According to an email written by Kazantsev 20 minutes prior to the shooting, the attack was not a terrorist incident.

During the shooting, Kazantsev had a baby monitor with him, one of which he installed on the first floor to hear the police and not get caught.

The law enforcers were forbidden to publicize Artyom Kazantsev's manifesto. He deleted everything from his computer and left a message there, in a file called «Manifesto», he wrote that he wanted to kill his mother. He changed his mind, as this could have derailed his global plan to attack the school. In the text, he criticizes and expresses hatred towards power and state bodies, specific political and cultural figures, as well as gives his assessment of the events. In preparation Kazantsev studied the actions of the operational services that stormed his predecessor shooters.

The perpetrator legally bought empty magazines from specialized stores four times. Investigators believe that he could have purchased ammunition illegally or using forged documents.

Employees are also discussing the issue of checking the decision of the magistrate of the Oktyabrsky District Court of Izhevsk, who, several years ago, contrary to the conclusion of a psychiatric forensic examination, did not impose compulsory medical measures on the accused after causing harm to the health of two passers-by. At that time it was established that Kazantsev in 2007 opened his veins in a military unit in the Chelyabinsk region, where he served in military service.

== Reactions ==
Kremlin Press Secretary Dmitry Peskov described the attack as "a terrorist act by a person who apparently belongs to a neo-fascist organisation or group".

Aleksandr Brechalov, the head of the Udmurt Republic, declared three days of mourning.

Words of condolences to the relatives of the victims and the injured were expressed by Russian president Vladimir Putin, Russian prime minister Mikhail Mishustin, and heads and representatives of the country's regions. Spontaneous memorials were organized in a number of cities of Russia and abroad.

The heads and representatives of foreign states and international organizations, including Chinese president Xi Jinping, the United Nations, the European Union, the Egyptian Ministry of Foreign Affairs, and the U.S. Embassy in Russia expressed their condolences, as well as words of condemnation of the shooting.

== See also ==
- Anapa college shooting (2026)
- Bryansk gymnasium shooting (2023)
- Veshkayma kindergarten shooting (2022)
- Krasnoyarsk kindergarten shooting (2022)
- Perm State University shooting (2021)
- Kazan gymnasium bombing and shooting (2021)
- Blagoveshchensk college shooting (2019)
- Kerch Polytechnic College massacre (2018)
- Barabinsk college shooting (2018)
- Moscow school shooting and hostage taking (2014)
- Beslan school hostage crisis (2004)
- List of school massacres by death toll
- List of school attacks in Russia
- List of mass shootings in Russia
- List of attacks related to secondary schools
- Neo-Nazism in Russia
- Columbine effect
- 2022 Barreiras school attack - A separate attack in Brazil that happened in the same day.
