= IZh-81 =

- Type: pump-action shotgun
- Place of origin: Russia

Production history
- Designer: S. G. Antonov; V. P. Votyakov; V. F. Sentyakov
- Designed: 1993
- Manufacturer: Izhevsk Mechanical Plant
- Produced: 1993 - 2000

Specifications
- Mass: 3.2 (IZh-81); 3.4 kg (IZk-81K)
- Length: 1200mm
- Barrel length: 700mm
- Caliber: 12 gauge
- Rate of fire: variable
- Feed system: four round magazine, plus 1 in the chamber
- Sights: iron sights

The IZh-81 (ИЖ-81) is a Russian pump-action shotgun.

== History ==
In 1990s and even in year 2000 IZh-81 was the most common shotgun in private security companies in Russia.

In 1997, work began on creating a semi-automatic shotgun based on the design of IZh-81. In 1998, first MP-151 shotgun was made. After tests and trials, in 1999 this shotgun was presented at the "IWA-99" arms exhibition in Nuremberg. However, only 100 MP-151 were made before its production was discontinued.

In year 2000 began serial production of new pump-action shotgun MP-133 (based on IZh-81M design) and new self-loading shotgun MP-153 (based on MP-133 design) was presented in Moscow arms exhibition. And in year 2000, production of IZh-81 was discontinued.

In April 2000, the price of one standard IZh-81 was between 4400 and 5400 rubles.

== Design ==
IZh-81 is a smoothbore shotgun.

It has a beech stock and fore-end.

== Variants ==
- IZh-81 (ИЖ-81) — standard version with 700mm barrel and fixed wooden stock, it has four round tubular magazine (12/70mm shells)

- IZh-81M (ИЖ-81M) — IZh-81 version (12/76mm Magnum shells)

- IZh-81 «Jaguar» (ИЖ-81 «Ягуар») — IZh-81 version for private security guards, it has 560mm barrel and wooden pistol grip without stock
- IZh-81 «Fox Terrier» (ИЖ-81 «Фокстерьер») — IZh-81 version for private security guards, it has 600mm barrel, AK-74M glass-filled polyamide folding stock and pistol grip
- IZh-81K (ИЖ-81К) — second model with 700mm barrel and fixed wooden stock, it has four round detachable box magazine (12/70mm shells)

- IZh-81KM (ИЖ-81КM) — IZh-81K version (12/76mm Magnum shells)

- MP-151 (Mechanical Plant-151) - semi-automatic shotgun based on IZh-81 design

== Users ==
- Bangladesh - IZh-81K shotguns were sold to Bangladesh Police
- Belarus - IZh-81 and IZh-81K are allowed as civilian hunting weapon
- Bosnia and Herzegovina - IZh-81 is officially adopted by Bosnian police
- Kazakhstan - IZh-81 is officially adopted by the customs service
- Russian Federation - IZh-81 is allowed as civilian hunting weapon. Also, it was allowed as service weapon in private security companies until March 1, 2006

== Criminal use ==
- An MP-113 (a rebrand of the IZh-81) owned by a private security company was the firearm used by Stepan Aleksandrovich Komarov during the 2014 Yuzhno-Sakhalinsk cathedral shooting.
- A legally-owned IZh-81 was used by Daniil Zasorin during the 2019 Blagoveshchensk college shooting.
- A Baikal MP-135 (a modernized version of the IZh-81) was used by Polina Platonovna Dvorkina to fatally shoot her father before attempting to shoot up a kindergarten where she had previously applied for a job.

== Sources ==
- Михаил Драгунов. Магазинное гладкоствольное ружьё ИЖ-81 // журнал "Мастер-ружьё", № 7/8, 1996. стр.16-26
- В. Н. Трофимов. Отечественные охотничьи ружья гладкоствольные. М., ДАИРС, 2000. стр.85-93
