= Kerch Polytechnic College =

Russian tertiary school in Crimea

- Керченский политехнический колледж
- Coat of arms
- Former names: Kerch Mining and Smelting Tekhnikum
- Type: Public
- Established: 1930
- Director: Denis Kolesnik
- Location: Kerch, Crimea; 45°21′23″N 36°32′08″E
- Website: kerchpoliteh.ru

Kerch Polytechnic College (Russian: Керченский политехнический колледж, romanized: Kerchenskiy politekhnicheskiy kolledzh) is a higher education institution in Kerch, Crimea. It trains personnel in 16 specialties, and about 300 students enroll for first-year studies at the college annually.

== History ==
It was established in 1930 as Kerch Mining and Smelting Tekhnikum (Russian: Керченский горно-металлургический техникум) to support the Kamysh-Burun Iron Ore Plant and the P. L. Voykov Metallurgical Factory. Having trained about a thousand graduates by the time of the German invasion in 1941, the tekhnikum was eventually evacuated to the Urals to later return to Kerch in 1945. Thereafter, it produced various specialists to work in metallurgical regions of Ukraine and at the Soviet Ministry of Ferrous Metallurgy, remaining the sole special secondary educational institution in the city until 1952.

The tekhnikum changed its profile and became a polytechnic in 1990. In 2011, it has been reorganized into Kerch Polytechnic College of the National University of Food Technologies (Ukrainian: Керченський політехнічний коледж Національного університету харчових технологій).

Shortly after the annexation of Crimea by the Russian Federation, the college was nationalized under Order of the State Council of Crimea on 11 April 2014. On 7 April 2015, the Museum of Battle Glory was opened at the college on the initiative of its tutor Vitaly Nekrasov. The Kerch Tekhnikum of Service Industry (found in 1925) was merged with Kerch Polytechnic College in 2016.

=== 2018 massacre ===
On 17 October 2018, Kerch Polytechnic College became the site of a mass shooting and bomb attack, in which 20 people were killed and 73 injured. The perpetrator subsequently committed suicide at the scene. He was later identified as 18-year-old Vladislav Roslyakov, a student at the college.

== Notable alumni ==
- Anatoly Kokorin (1921–1943) – Hero of the Soviet Union, junior lieutenant.
- Ivan Gerashchenko (1920–1945) – Hero of the Soviet Union, sergeant.
- Vladimir Alkidov (1920–1982) – Hero of the Soviet Union, lieutenant.
- Stepan Poshivalnikov (1919–1944) – Hero of the Soviet Union, captain.
- Anatoly Pushkarenko (1913–1964) – Hero of the Soviet Union, major.
- Vasily Tynkov (1920–1974) – Hero of the Soviet Union, senior sergeant.
- Vladislav Roslyakov (2000-2018) - Perpetrator of the Kerch Polytechnic College massacre which resulted in 20 deaths and 70 injuries.
