= Oktyabrsky, Permsky District, Perm Krai =

Oktyabrsky Октябрьский
- Settlement
- Location within Perm Krai Location within Russia
- Coordinates: 57°28′N 56°01′E
- Country: Russia
- Region: Perm Krai
- District: Permsky District
- Time zone: UTC+5:00

Oktyabrsky (Russian: Октябрьский) is a rural locality (a settlement) in Palnikovskoye Rural Settlement, Permsky District, Perm Krai, Russia. The population was 185 as of 2010. There are 5 streets.

== Geography ==
Oktyabrsky is located 200 km south of Perm (the district's administrative centre) by road. Snezhnoye is the nearest rural locality.
