= Asovo =

Asovo Асово
- Selo
- Location within Perm Krai Location within Russia
- Coordinates: 57°30′N 57°40′E
- Country: Russia
- Region: Perm Krai
- District: Beryozovsky District
- Time zone: UTC+5:00

Asovo (Russian: Асово) is a rural locality (a selo) and the administrative center of Asovskoye Rural Settlement, Beryozovsky District, Perm Krai, Russia. The population was 826 as of 2010. There are 14 streets.

== Geography ==
It is located 25 km south-east from Beryozovka.
