= Murder in Russian law =

Russian legal policy

According to the modern Russian Criminal Code, only intentional killing of another human is considered as a murder (Russian убийство transliteration ubiystvo). The following types of murder are defined:

- Murder per se (article 105 of Criminal Code):
  - common corpus delicti (with no aggravating circumstances listed below). Punished with a sentence between 6 and 15 years
  - qualified corpus delicti. Punished with a sentence between 8 and 20 years, life sentence, or death penalty. Aggravating circumstances:

a) against two or more people;
b) against person on public duty or their relatives;
c) killing of hostage, kidnapped or helpless person;
d) killing of pregnant;
e) committed with particular cruelty;
f) committed in a generally dangerous way;
g) motivated by a blood feud (vendetta);
h) committed by a group of persons, a group of persons under a preliminary conspiracy, or an organized group;
i) for a profit, including contract killing, or connected with a robbery, extort or banditry;
j) with a rowdy motive;
k) to cover or secure another crime;
l) connected with a rape or sexual assault;
m) hate crime;
n) with the aim to use organs or tissues of victim.

- Privileged types of murder:
  - Of newborn child by mother (article 106 of Criminal Code), punished with a sentence up to 5 years.
  - In affected state (art. 107), up to 3 years (up to 5 years for multiple killing).
  - Exceeding reasonable level of self-defense (art. 108), up to 2 years.

There are some other articles of criminal code, that provide special punishment for crimes connected with intentional kills:

- seizure of hostages;
- terrorism;
- sabotage;

- punished with a sentence between 15 and 20 years, or life.

- genocide;
- encroachment on person on public or government duty;
- encroachment on law officer or soldier;
- encroachment on person administering justice or engaged in a preliminary investigation.

- punished with a sentence between 12 and 20 years or life sentence.

Separately considered actions that cause unpremeditated death of another person:

- accident killing (art. 108, punished with a limitation of freedom or imprisonment up to 5 years — depends on circumstances);
- death in a traffic accident (art. 263–264, punished with an imprisonment up to 9 years if aggravating circumstances such as alcohol or drugs intoxication or multiply victims exist, also provided disqualification from driving)

Assault that has no purpose to kill, but causes a death of victim, formally is not considered as a murder, but punishment for it almost not distinguished from common murder (art. 111 part 4 provides punishment with a sentence for up to 15 years, so only lower limit of punishment slightly easier).

Article 110 of the criminal code also provides punishment for driving a person to suicide (by blackmail, threats or cruelty).

== See also ==
- List of murder laws by country
