= 2026 Anapa college shooting =

School shooting in Russia

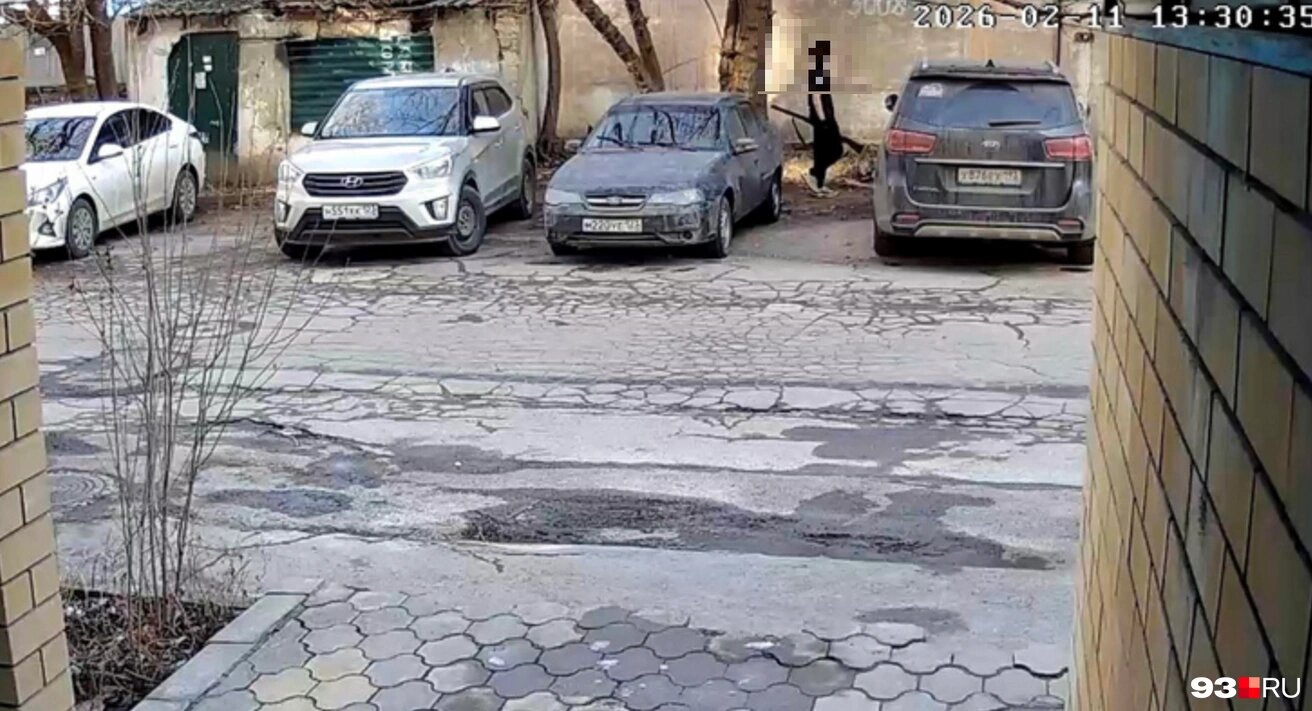
- The suspected gunman going to the college
- Location: Anapa, Krasnodar Krai, Russia
- Date: 11 February 2026; 9 months ago
- Target: College students and staff
- Attack type: School shooting
- Weapon: TOZ-34 double-barreled shotgun
- Deaths: 1
- Injuries: 2
- Perpetrator: Ilya O.
- Defender: Nikolai Pavlovich
- Motive: Under investigation

On 11 February 2026, a school shooting took place at the Anapa Technical College in Anapa, Krasnodar Krai, Russia. A security guard was killed while trying to stop the attacker and two others were injured. The suspect, a 17-year-old student, was detained at the scene.

== Background ==
Around 1,500 students are enrolled at the Anapa Technical College's main campus. It provides degrees in fields like auto repair, nursing, advertising and programming.

The shooting occurred amid a recent series of school attacks across Russia.

== Shooting ==
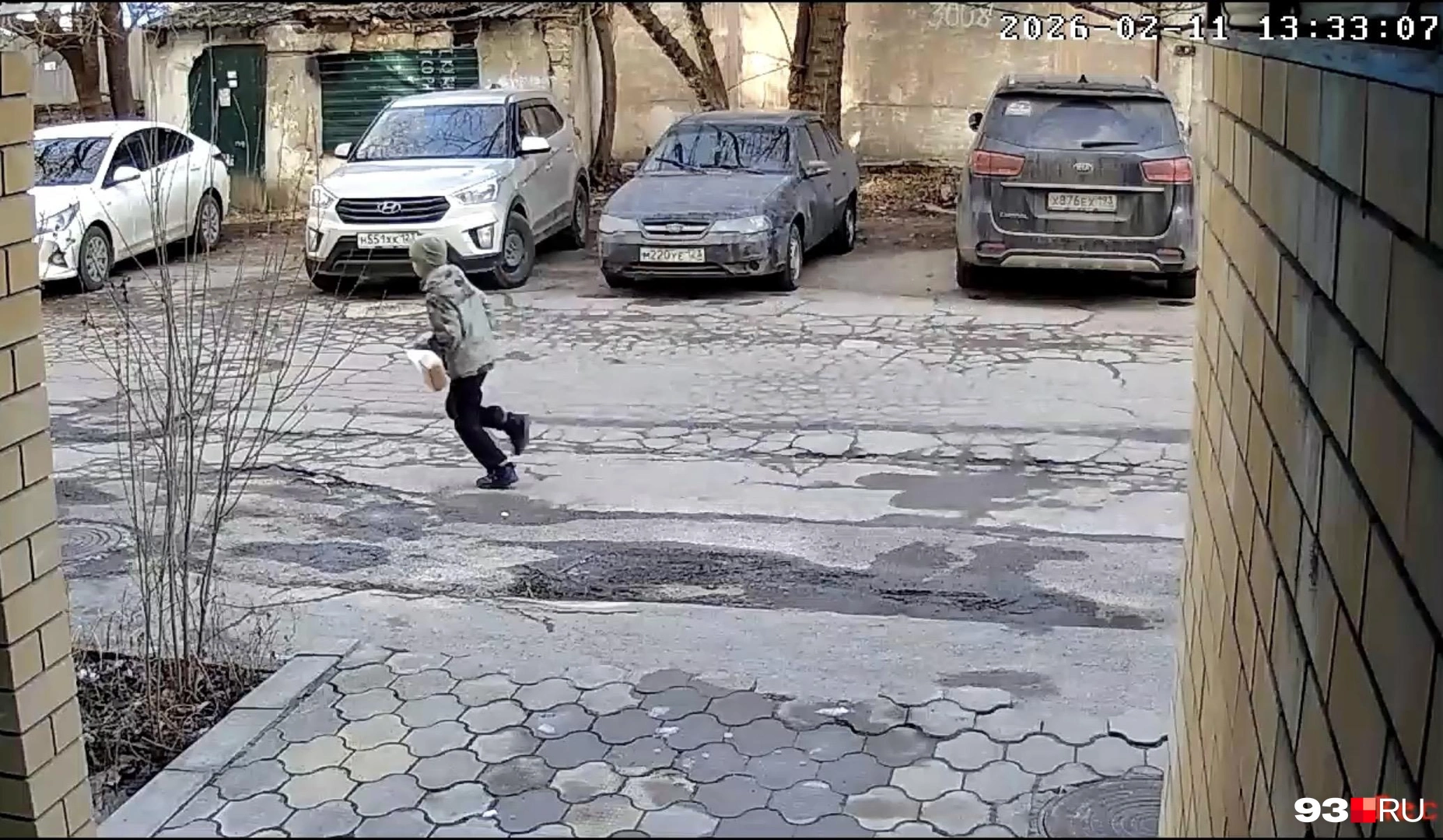
A bystander fleeing after hearing gunshots

Twenty minutes before the attack, the alleged shooter asked his friend if there was a lesson going on and how many people would be at the entrance. Afterwards, he fired ten shots in the hallway and three on the street. He reloaded his gun six times during the attack and was wearing a vest containing ammunition. A security guard Nikolai Pavlovich saw him fire at an employee on the school's CCTV cameras. He immediately blocked the entrances, but was killed. He managed to press the panic button, call the National Guard and contact the second security post before dying. When the suspect allegedly shot the guard, a student in the hallway was also struck by gunfire.

== Victims ==
The security guard was identified as 55-year-old Nikolai Pavlovich. The injured victims were identified as a female librarian (b. 1981) and a male student (b. 2007). The condition of the injured victims is reported to be moderate. The student was discharged from the Anapa city hospital on February 20. The librarian was transferred to Krasnodar for treatment but was expected to return to Anapa for further treatment.

== Suspect ==
According to Lenta.ru, the attacker was a 17-year-old technical school student identified as Ilya O., who majored in vehicle repair and maintenance. According to acquaintances, he had no previous history of violent behavior. It was reported that shortly before the attack, a post containing threats of violence was published on his Telegram profile. The account associated with him also posted materials related to previous attacks on educational institutions, specifically the Perm State University shooting, the Kerch Polytechnic College massacre and the Columbine High School massacre.

The version circulating on social media about a possible motive being the non-issuance of a diploma has not received official confirmation.

== Aftermath ==
A mobile mental health support center was set up for students, their parents and faculty at the college. Security was strengthened at educational institutions across Krasnodar Krai following the shooting. The family of the security guard who was killed received the Tigran Keosayan award. A memorial for him was set up by the college where the shooting occurred. He was buried at the Anapa City Cemetery on February 14.

== Investigation ==
Forensic experts recovered firearms, shell casings and ammunition from the scene. The shotgun used in the attack was reportedly taken from the suspect's grandfather. A criminal case has been opened in connection with the attack. A day after the attack, a friend of the perpetrator was arrested for allegedly convincing him to carry out the shooting. A criminal case was also filed against a 64-year-old relative who failed to secure the weapon.

== See also ==
- List of school shootings in Russia
- List of mass shootings in Russia
- List of attacks related to post-secondary schools
