= List of school attacks in the United Kingdom =

This is a chronological list of school attacks in the United Kingdom, cases that occurred in England, Scotland, Wales, and Northern Ireland.

The term "attack" excludes cases of accidents, attacks committed by police officers, and suicides of one or more people.

== List ==
Date	Location	Perpetrator(s)	Dead	Injured	Total	Description
15 September 1595	Edinburgh, Scotland	William Sinclair, 13	1	0	1	13-year-old William Sinclair, whom was a member of Clan Sinclair, fired a pistol from a window at Edinburgh High School during a riot, killing bailie John MacMorran. Due to his royal ties, Sinclair was pardoned and never punished for the murder.
6 November 1890	Oxford, England	Catherine Riordan	0	1	1	In an apparent romantic dispute, Catherine Riordan shot University of Oxford College master James Franck Bright outside his home on the collage grounds.
5 December 1891	London, England	Francisco Blanes, 15	0	1 (Note: Including the perpetrator/s or suspect)	1	Following a physical dispute on the grounds of Tooting College between 15-year-old foreign students Francisco Blanes and Fernando Maximo du Sousa, Blanes pulled out a gun and fired a shot, striking a school wall. Blanes was disarmed and arrested.
1 February 1913	London, England	Frederick Sauri, 16	0	1	1	16-year-old student Frederick Sauri attempted to murder fellow student Manuel Coello at Forest House School, Woodford.
13 June 1917	London, England	Unknown (Luftstreitkräfte)	18	30	48	In the first mass bombing raid of London during World War I, a German Gotha G.V dropped a 50 kilogram (110 lb) bomb on Upper North Street School, resulting in the deaths of 18 children.
3 June 1930	Cambridge, England	Douglas Potts, 19	3	0	3	19-year-old student Douglas Potts shot and killed tutor Sandy Wollaston as well as a policeman before committing suicide at King's College.
14 September 1933	Radernie, Scotland	Unknown	0	0	0	A man recklessly shot at a window of Radernie Public School while school children were inside the classroom.
27 December 1935	Belfast, Northern Ireland	Jimmy Steele, numerous other Irish Republican Army fighters	0	1	1	Irish Republican Jimmy Steele led an attempted raid by the Irish Republican Army on Campbell College to secure weaponry that was inside. The RUC was aware of the plot and awaited the assailants, which resulted in a brief gun fight, causing Constable Ian Hay to be wounded.
17 May 1940	Oxford, England	John Fulljames, 19	1	3	4	Three students were injured and a fourth killed after being shot at Oxford University. 19-year-old John Fulljames, who fired the shots through his window, was arrested.
10 September 1940	London, England	Unknown (Luftwaffe)	77 (possibly higher)	Unknown	77+	South Hallsville School in Canning Town was bombed during a German air raid whilst its basement was in use as an air raid shelter. Official government figures state 77 were killed in the bombing, however it is speculated the actual number of deaths was much higher.
3 October 1940	London, England	Unknown (Luftwaffe)	7	Unknown	7+	During the Battle of Britain, Alfred Street Junior School was hit by a German bomb, resulting in the deaths of seven pupils.
15 December 1940	London, England	Unknown (Luftwaffe)	0	Unknown	Unknown	A German bomb during an air raid intended for a factory accidentally drifted over to Duckmanton Council School. A large oak tree reportedly absorbed most of the ensuing blast, resulting in no deaths from the attack.
20 January 1943	London, England	Heinz Schumann, 28 (Luftwaffe)	44	60	104	Bombing of Sandhurst Road School: A German fighter-bomber bombed Sandhurst Road School during an air raid above London. 44 people died, and 60 were injured. The pilot was identified as 28-year-old Heinz Schumann.
16 October 1945	London, England	Unnamed, 13	0	1	1	As teacher Cyril Morris lectured students who had not completed their homework at William Morris School in Walthamstow, a student shot and wounded him. A 13-year-old was arrested.
15 February 1947	Eccleshall, England	Gerald Cawley	1	0	1	Standon Farm School shooting: Nine Standon Farm Approved School students conspired to murder their headteacher and stole rifles from the cadet armoury to do so. A teacher interrupted the burglary, causing one of the boys to shoot and kill him.
20 September 1948	Hemingford Grey, England	Michael Uramowski, 32	2	0	2	Michael Uramowski, 32, broke into his ex-wife's school and killed her in the schoolyard before killing himself. The victim was a local teacher.
26 March 1958	Ashington, England	Unknown	0	1	1	A 13-year-old was grazed by a gunshot in the schoolyard of Hirst Park County Secondary School.
7 April 1959	Rotherham, England	Bernard Walden, 33	2	0	2	Teacher Bernard Walden, 33, armed inside Rotherham College, killed a former student and a staff member before being arrested.
29 June 1964	Cumnor, England	Unknown	0	2	2	An intruder broke into a girl's dormitory at a finishing school, causing a headmistress and a student to receive blunt injuries. The intruder was scared off after a shotgun was discharged, missing him, and successfully escaped.
1 November 1967	Dundee, Scotland	Robert Mone, 19	1	2	3	Dundee school shooting: Former student Robert Mone took teacher Nanette Hanson and a class of students hostage at St John's Roman Catholic High School. Mone fatally shot Hanson and sexually assaulted two girls before being arrested.
1972	Grangemouth, Scotland	James Gallacher, 16	0	1	1	16-year-old James Gallacher fired a rifle into a playground at Moray High School, wounding a boy taking driving lessons in the arm.
18 March 1976	Alton, England	Unnamed, 16	0	1	1	A 16-year-old school girl took 26 students at Amery Hill School hostage for nearly two hours. As police subdued the hostage-taker, the gun discharged into the ceiling, wounding one student with falling plaster.
7 June 1978	Bournemouth, England	Unnamed	0	1	1	A policeman was shot on the grounds of Summerbee School after responding to reports of intruders in the classrooms.
11 November 1987	London, England	Rajinder Singh Batth, 37; Mangit Singh Sunder, 25	3	3	6	Dormers Wells High School shooting: Three men were shot dead and three others, including both gunmen who committed the attack, were wounded. The attack occurred at Dormers Wells High School.
6 January 1988	Higham Ferrers, England	Darren Lloyd Fowler, 16	0	4	4	Ferrers School shooting: Darren Lloyd Fowler, a 16-year-old student, opened fire and injured two students and two teachers inside Ferrers School.
5 March 1991	Bristol, England	Andre Crumpton, 15	0	1	1	15-year-old Andre Crumpton opened fire inside a classroom at Colston's School, wounding housemaster Roderick Findlay before fleeing. He had apparently planned to kill at least eight people.
10 April 1991	Glasgow, Scotland	Barbara Glover, 16	1	0	1	16-year-old Diane Watson was stabbed to death by 16-year-old Barbara Glover at Whitehill Secondary School in the Dennistoun area of Glasgow.
25 July 1992	York, England	Robin Pask, 31	1	0	1	Open University lecturer Elizabeth Howe was stabbed to death in her rooms at Wentworth College, University of York by a man.
7 January 1993	Whittlesey, England	Unnamed, 14	0	1	1	14-year-old Stefan Beck was stabbed by a classmate during a lesson at Sir Harry Smith Community College.
12 January 1993	London, England	Unnamed, 15	0	1	1	A 15-year-old student at Kingsdale Foundation School stabbed a 14-year-old classmate in the stomach during a fight.
19 April 1993	Belfast, Northern Ireland	Three unnamed	1	0	1	62-year-old Belfast Royal Academy security guard Joseph Walsh was fatally injured during a burglary when a breeze block was dropped on his head.
14 June 1993	Ockbrook, England	Unnamed, 13	0	1	1	A pupil at Hopwell Hall attacked a staff member with a piece of wood.
22 November 1993	Luton, England	Unnamed	0	1	1	A former student at Lea Manor High School entered the school and slashed a current student in the face.
28 March 1994	Middlesbrough, England	Stephen Wilkinson, 29	1	2	3	Stephen Wilkinson, a 29-year-old schizophrenic, stormed Hall Garth Community Arts College and stabbed three students, killing a 12-year-old, before being subdued and arrested.
7 June 1994	Camberley, England	Sharon Carr, 14	0	1	1	Sharon Carr, who had previously murdered a woman at the age of 12, stabbed another student at Collingwood College.
17 June 1994	Holywood, County Down, Northern Ireland	Garnet Bell, 46	0	6	6	Garnet Bell, a 46-year-old former student of Sullivan Upper School, injured six students, three of them seriously, using a flamethrower.
8 December 1995	London, England	Learco Chindamo, 15	1	1	2	Murder of Philip Lawrence: Philip Lawrence was stabbed to death outside the gates of his school by 15-year-old gang member Learco Chindamo at St George's Roman Catholic Secondary School. He had attempted to intervene in the beating of a 13-year-old pupil by Chindamo.
13 March 1996	Dunblane, Scotland	Thomas Hamilton, 43	18	15	33	Dunblane massacre: Thomas Hamilton, 43, stormed Dunblane Primary School and opened fire on students and teachers before committing suicide. It is the deadliest mass shooting in British history.
8 July 1996	Wolverhampton, England	Horrett Irving Campbell, 32	0	7	7	Wolverhampton machete attack: Three children and four adults were stabbed by Horrett Irving Campbell during a picnic at St. Luke's School. One of the adults was seriously injured. It was later established that Campbell was schizophrenic.
30 September 1999	London, England	Two unnamed	0	2	2	Two teenagers were arrested after stabbing a teacher and a pupil outside Highbury Grove School.
14 March 2000	Newton Mearns, Scotland	Ewan McDonald, 19; Anthony O'Neil, 18; James Bone, 17; Grant Stewart, 17	0	1	1	15-year-old Neil McMartin was attacked and stabbed by four teenagers during a fight at Mearns Castle High School.
9 May 2003	Stradbroke, England	Unnamed, 15	0	1	1	A 15-year-old was stabbed in a school toilet at Stradbroke High School.
4 November 2003	North Somercotes, England	Alan Pennell, 15	1	0	1	14-year-old Luke Walmsley was stabbed to death by another student at Birkbeck School.
3 June 2004	Belfast, Northern Ireland	Unknown (possibly Irish National Liberation Army)	1	0	1	31-year-old Kevin McAlorum was shot dead whilst sitting in his car in the driveway of Oakwood Primary School. The assailants were believed to have had ties to the Irish National Liberation Army.
7 November 2004	London, England	Sajid Zulfiqar, 26; Zahid Bashir, 24; Imran Maqsood, 22	1	0	1	Three men kicked and beat 30-year-old former student Christopher Yates to death on the campus of the University of East London.
18 November 2004	Bristol, England	Unnamed, 13	0	1	1	A 13-year-old student at Patchway Community College stabbed another student.
4 March 2005	Horley, England	Unnamed, 14	0	1	1	A student at Oakwood School stabbed another student during lunchtime.
15 July 2005	Stevenage, England	Unnamed, 15	0	1	1	A 15-year-old student was stabbed by another student at Thomas Alleynes School.
13 September 2005	Glasgow, Scotland	William Kerr, 15	0	1	1	A 15-year-old chased a 16-year-old student at Whitehill Secondary School and stabbed him several times.
3 October 2005	Cambridge, England	Althea Foster, 61	0	1	1	A woman stabbed a 44-year-old University of Cambridge postgraduate student in her room at Lucy Cavendish College under the belief she was having an affair with the attacker's husband.
10 November 2005	Camberley, England	Unnamed, 14	0	1	1	15-year-old Natashia Jackman was stabbed with scissors by a 14-year-old student at Collingwood College. Another two students helped hide the weapon used.
15 June 2006	London, England	Unnamed	0	1	1	A student was stabbed at Claremont High School.
10 March 2007	Loughborough, England	Jermain Carty, 22	0	1	1	A man was shot in the abdomen after an argument at a concert hosted by Loughborough University.
15 March 2007	Rugeley, England	Three unnamed, 12	0	17	17	Three boys fired BB guns in the playground of Etching Hill Primary School, wounding seventeen students.
1 February 2008	Leeds, England	Unnamed, 13	0	1	1	A 13-year-old student at Allerton Grange School stabbed 14-year-old Shaquille Clarke-Adams in a classroom.
24 April 2008	London, England	Six unnamed, 14 to 17	0	1	1	A student was stabbed in the grounds of Salesian College in Battersea. Six teenagers were arrested.
22 June 2009	Walsall, England	Unnamed, 14	0	1	1	Two 14-year-old boys got into a fight over a football game when one of them pulled out a knife and stabbed his opponent in the upper thigh.
25 June 2009	Keyworth, England	Unnamed, 14	0	1	1	A 14-year-old student at South Wolds Community School stabbed another 14-year-old in a classroom.
2 July 2010	London, England	Helder Demorais, 17; Ricardo Giddings, 17; Jamal Moore, 17; Kyle Kinghorn, 18; Shaquille Haughton, 16	1	1	2	Two students were stabbed at Park Campus School; one, a 15-year-old, died, and the other was injured. Four teenagers were convicted of murder and a fifth of manslaughter in connection with the attack.
13 June 2012	Bingham, England	Unnamed, 14	0	26	26	A 14-year-old pupil at Toot Hill School stabbed 26 other students with an insulin needle during lunch break.
9 October 2012	Norfolk, England	Minheng He, 17	0	1	1	A student stabbed another student in the shoulder and elbow at Langley School. The 17-year-old suspect was arrested on suspicion of causing grievous bodily harm with intent. He was initially sentenced to four years in a young offenders' institution, but had his sentence reduced.
27 November 2012	Crosby, England	Unnamed, 13	0	1	1	A 13-year-old pupil at St Michaels Church of England High School stabbed another student with a pencil.
30 May 2013	Edinburgh, Scotland	Jack Hewitt, 17	0	8	8	A 17-year-old fired a BB gun from his home at students in the playground of Gilmerton Primary School, wounding eight children.
9 December 2013	Plymouth, England	Unnamed, 14	0	1	1	A 14-year-old Eggbuckland Community College student stabbed another student in the back.
28 April 2014	Leeds, England	William Cornick, 15	1	0	1	Murder of Ann Maguire: Whilst teaching a Spanish lesson at Corpus Christi College in Leeds, teacher Ann Maguire was abruptly stabbed by 15-year-old pupil Will Cornick. Cornick had apparently discussed "brutally murdering" Maguire with friends prior to the attack.
22 May 2014	Belfast, Northern Ireland	Unnamed, 20	0	2	2	A man stabbed another in a restroom at Belfast Metropolitan College. He was also injured during the incident before being arrested.
18 June 2014	Wolverhampton, England	Unnamed, 10	0	1	1	A 10-year-old pupil at New Park School was arrested after stabbing a teacher with a pencil.
31 October 2014	London, England	Kevin Mao, 20	1	0	1	22-year-old Noor Hassan Barre was stabbed to death outside the student union at Middlesex University.
11 June 2015	Bradford, England	Unnamed, 14	0	1	1	Vincent Uzomah, a black teacher at Dixons Kings Academy in Bradford was stabbed in a racially motivated attack whilst teaching a lesson. The perpetrator, who was of Pakistani origin, was a 14-year-old pupil.
28 October 2015	Aberdeen, Scotland	Daniel Stroud, 16	1	0	1	A 16-year-old student was stabbed to death at Cults Academy. A fellow student was arrested.
30 December 2016	Oxford, England	Lavinia Woodward, 24	0	1	1	An intoxicated Oxford University student stabbed her boyfriend in the leg with a breadknife in her accommodation at Christ Church college.
23 January 2017	London, England	Unnamed, 15	1	0	1	Quamari Barnes, a student at Capital City Academy, was stabbed after being threatened by a fellow pupil at a bus stop. He ran towards the school for safety, and was later taken to hospital where he died. A 15-year-old pupil was arrested.
25 September 2017	Winterton, England	Elisha Burkill, 16	0	1	1	Elisha Burkill, a 16-year-old student at Winterton Community Academy, stabbed Joy Simon, an Inclusion support officer, before being subdued by other staff members. She was sentenced to seven years detainment in 2018.
11 December 2019	Formby, England	Axel Rudakubana, 13	0	1	1	Axel Rudakubana, a 13-year-old former student at Range High School who had been expelled earlier for bringing a knife onto the premises, returned to the school and attacked another student with a hockey stick before being subdued. Rudakubana would later go onto perpetrate the 2024 Southport stabbings.
17 November 2021	Warwick, England	Rohan Ahluwalia-Pandor, 18	0	1	1	A student at the University of Warwick was stabbed by another student in his halls of residence.
25 January 2022	Barrow-in-Furness, England	Unnamed, 15	0	1	1	A 15-year-old student at Walney School stabbed another student multiple times.
31 January 2022	Nottingham, England	Ryan Usher, 48	0	1	1	A former Nottingham Trent University student stabbed lecturer Neil Turnbull multiple times in his university office.
5 February 2023	Epsom, England	George Pattinson, 39	3	0	3	On the grounds of Epsom College, 39-year-old George Pattinson killed his 45-year-old wife and 7-year-old daughter before killing himself.
9 June 2023	Tiverton, England	Thomas Wei Huang, 16	0	3	3	A 16-year-old Malaysian student boarding at Blundell's School attacked two other students and a teacher with claw hammers.
10 July 2023	Tewkesbury, England	Unnamed, 15	0	1	1	A 15-year-old male student stabbed a maths teacher at Tewkesbury Academy. The student was apparently suffering from Suicidal ideation at the time of the attack. He was sentenced to 14 months detention in September 2023.
24 April 2024	Ammanford, Wales	Unnamed, 13	0	3	3	Two teachers and a student were stabbed by a 13-year-old female student.
1 May 2024	Sheffield, England	Louis Melotte, 17	0	3	3	A 17-year-old student from Birley Academy, armed with a shard of glass, attacked two staff members and a 12-year-old student before being detained.
3 February 2025	Sheffield, England	Mohammed Umar Khan, 15	1	0	1	Murder of Harvey Willgoose: 15-year-old Harvey Willgoose was stabbed by fellow pupil Mohammed Khan at All Saints Catholic High School following a personal grievance between the two.
24 April 2025	Aberdeen, Scotland	Unnamed, 14	0	1	1	A 14-year-old girl attacked a 12-year-old girl with a knife at Hazlehead Academy.
2 May 2025	Caddington, England	Unnamed, 16	0	2	2	A 16-year-old boy stabbed 2 people at Manshead Church of England Academy with only minor injuries. The boy admitted to wounding, false imprisonment and threats with a knife.
21 May 2025	London, England	Unnamed	0	1	1	A man was stabbed on the campus of Brunel University.
10 June 2025	Birmingham, England	Six unnamed, 13 to 14	0	1	1	A 15-year-old student at Moseley School in Birmingham with minor injuries. Six students, all 13 to 14 years old, were arrested in connection to the incident.
10 September 2025	Birmingham, England	Unnamed, 17	0	1	1	A student stabbed another student at University College Birmingham.
6 November 2025	Reading, England	Two unnamed, 17 & 16	0	1	1	A person was injured following a stabbing at Reading College, causing a large response from the police. The perpetrators, a 17-year-old and 16-year-old male, were later arrested, and charged with intent and possessing a bladed article on school premises and assault by beating respectively.
22 November 2025	Birmingham, England	Unnamed	0	1	1	A teenager was stabbed on the campus of Aston University following a football match.
February 5, 2026	Milford Haven, Wales	Unnamed, 15	0	1	1	A 15 year-old student stabbed a teacher in the head at Milford Haven School in Pembrokeshire. At age 16, the boy was found not guilty of attempted murder in July 2026.
10 February 2026	London, England	Unnamed, 13	0	2	2	Kingsbury High School stabbing: Two students, aged 12 and 13, were stabbed at Kingsbury High School; a 13-year-old classmate was arrested.
5 March 2026	Nottingham, England	Unnamed, 15	0	1	1	A 15-year-old boy stabbed another 15-year-old boy at Nottingham University Academy of Science and Technology. The boy was charged with causing grievous bodily harm and two counts of possession of a knife on school premises.
11 March 2026	Thorpe St Andrew, England	Unnamed, 15	0	1	1	A 15-year-old male was arrested after a female student was injured via stabbing at Thorpe St Andrew School in Norwich. The incident caused a large police response and a lockdown that lasted approximately 3 hours. It was later discovered the perpetrator planned to carry out a large scale attack with multiple casualties.
4 June 2026	Guildford, England	Almunthir Daqamah, 21	0	1	1	Almunthir Daqamah, a 21-year-old Saudi national and former student of the University of Surrey, shot a member of staff on campus with a crossbow before being subdued. He was charged the following day with attempted murder, possession of a bladed article, and possession of Class B drugs.
9 June 2026	Manchester, England	Unnamed, 14	0	3	3	A schoolgirl was arrested for stabbing two fellow students and a member of staff. The school was put into lockdown and was closed down later on.

== See also ==
- List of school shootings in Europe
- List of mass stabbings in the United Kingdom
- List of mass shootings in the United Kingdom
