= List of mass shootings in the Soviet Union =

This is a list of known mass shootings that have occurred in the Soviet Union.

== List of mass shootings in the Soviet Union ==
Date	Location	Republic	Dead	Injured	Total	Description
31 August 1920	Petrograd	RSFSR	8	10	18	Kuusinen Club Incident: Eight members of the Finnish Communist Party were murdered in their office.
26 July 1925	Ivankovo, Kostroma Governorate	RSFSR	11	8	19	Grachov murder case: Grigory Grachov fatally shot 11 people and injured eight others.
30 August 1933	Prigorodny	RSFSR	5	0	5	Prigorodny forest murders: Alexander Labutkin shot and killed five people in a forest.
11 January 1935	Prigorodny	RSFSR	4	0	4	Prigorodny forest murders: Alexander Labutkin shot and killed four people in a forest.
1 May 1954	Arkhangelsk	RSFSR	2	4 (Note: Including the perpetrator)	6	Arkhangelsk Trade Unions Square shooting: Nikolai Gavrilovich Romanov fatally shot two people and wounded three others.
11 February 1958	Lyamino	RSFSR	7	6	13	1958 Lyamino school shooting: Mikhail Tselousov fatally shot seven people and wounded six others.
26 July 1959	Vaindloo	ESSR	7	0	7	Theodore Matvievsky fatally shot seven people.
7 September 1964	Malyy Melik	RSFSR	6	1	7	Yuri Ilyasov fatally shot six people and wounded one.
19 August 1966	Almaty	KSSR	2	2	4	Nikolai Kendenov shot and killed one person and wounded two others before being killed.
26/27 September 1968	Kursk	RSFSR	14	11	25	Kursk Railway Station Square shooting: Victor Korshunov and Yury Surovtsev fatally shot 13 people and wounded 11. Korshunov was killed by Surovtsev.
23 November 1970	Titovka	RSFSR	3	4	7	Yuri Gaev fatally shot three soldiers and wounded three others.
July 1972	Kuressaare	ESSR	4	0	4	An unknown soldier fatally shot three people and himself.
22 February 1973	Otradny	RSFSR	11	5	16	Mikhail Dorofeev and Alexander Shurygin killed 11 people and injured five.
13 December 1975	Permsky District	RSFSR	5 (Note: including an unborn child)	15	20	Alexander Zhidkov and Mikhail Veretelnik killed four people and wounded 14 others. Zhidkov was injured by the police.
7 August 1976	Letipea	ESSR	8	18	24	Letipea massacre: Viktor Bagižev killed 7 and wounded 18 people before either committing suicide or being killed by a bystander.
19 May 1977	Leningrad	RSFSR	6	3	9	1977 Leningrad shooting: Anatoly Fedorenko killed six cadets and wounded two. He was also injured by one of the fatally wounded cadets.
29 June 1978	Baku	AzSSR	4	0	4	Zia Mudarov shot and killed three people, including Arif Heydarov, before committing suicide.
10 October 1979	Elkhotovo	RSFSR	8	2	10	Sofia restaurant shooting: Bandits fatally shot eight people and injured two.
23 February 1987	Leningrad Oblast	RSFSR	8	0	8	Sakalauskas murder case: Arturas Sakalauskas killed eight people.
16 August 1989	Novohorivka, Zaporizhzhia Oblast	UkSSR	5	0	5	Anatoly Onoprienko shot and killed a family of five while they were sleeping in a car before lighting it on fire.
14 July 1991	Patrikeyevo	RSFSR	11	2	13	Vitaly Semenikhin and Muradov killed eight soldiers, three warrant officers and wounded two other soldiers. Muradov subsequently committed suicide, and Semenikhin was caught and sentenced to death, which was later commuted to life imprisonment.

== See also ==
- List of mass shootings in Russia
- Shooting of fellow soldiers
