= List of school shootings in Europe =

This chronological list of school shootings in Europe includes any school shootings that occurred at primary and secondary public or private schools, as well as colleges and universities, and on school buses. A "school shooting" is defined by this list as any discharge of a firearm on school grounds while students and staff are present for educational or work activities. Excluded from this list are the following:

1. Incidents that occurred during wars
2. Incidents that occurred as a result of police actions
3. Suicides or suicide attempts involving only one person.

Shooting by school staff are covered. For countries such as Russia or Turkey that straddle the border between Europe and Asia, this list only includes events that occurred on the European side of the country.

== 16th century ==
=== 1590s ===
1 incident.

Date	Location	Deaths	Injuries	Total	Description
1595
15 September 1595	Edinburgh, Scotland	1	0	1	13-year-old William Sinclair of Mey, a member of Clan Sinclair, fired a pistol from a window during a riot at Edinburgh High School, killing bailie John MacMorran. Sinclair was pardoned due to the intervention of his relatives, who had James VI argue that Sinclair was too young to be punished.

== 19th century ==
=== 1870s ===
3 incidents.

Date	Location	Deaths	Injuries	Total	Description
1871
25 May 1871	Saarbrücken, German Empire	0	2	2	18-year-old Julius Becker fired shots at the Saarbrücken Gymnasium, wounding two classmates.
1874
5 May 1874	Yekaterinburg, Russian Empire	1	0	1	A gymnasium student was noticed smoking in the toilet by his head teacher Yakov Predtechensky, then after a decision to expel the student, Alexei Skachkov, he murdered Predtechensky using a revolver.
1875
31 January 1875	Oldham, England	1	0	1	A student named Worsley shot and killed a boy named Hamilton inside the Oldham Bluecoats School.

=== 1880s ===
1 incident.

Date	Location	Deaths	Injuries	Total	Description
1885
20 November 1885	London, England	1	0	1	As 9-year-old William Leach was playing with friends in the playground of St. Andrew's Schools in Plaistow, another boy, William Slade, fired a gun, accidentally shooting Leach in the head and killing him.

=== 1890s ===
13 incidents.

Date	Location	Deaths	Injuries	Total	Description
1890
6 November 1890	Oxford, England	0	1	1	Catherine Riordan shot and wounded University College, Oxford master James Franck Bright outside his college house in a romantic dispute.
1891
5 December 1891	London, England	0	0	0	15-year-old Francisco Blanes and Fernando Maximo du Sousa, both foreign students at Tooting College, got into a dispute in the college ground after Blanes called du Sousa a liar. Du Sousa struck Blanes, who pulled out a gun and fired a shot, striking a school wall. Blanes was disarmed and arrested.
1892
21 April 1892	Dundee, Scotland	0	1	1	19-year-old John Smith fired a shot at students inside Old Butterburn School, wounding a girl.
14 September 1892	Tarnopol, Austria-Hungary	2 (Note: Including the perpetrator or suspect)	0	2	As students were leaving the gymnasium, student Johann Schwed killed professor Felix Glovacki with a revolver before killing himself.
23 October 1892	Lytham St Annes, England	0	1	1	A student at Pembroke House School accidentally shot another boy in the leg with a rifle.
23 November 1892	Leeds, England	1	0	1	15-year-old Bertie Woods was accidentally shot dead in a school.
1893
10 March 1893	Carlisle, England	0	1	1	A teacher at Christ Church Schools accidentally shot a boy through the lungs, believing the weapon was empty.
4 October 1893	Stockport, England	0	1	1	Student William Liddell was accidentally shot in the face in a room at Stockport Grammar School.
1894
3 March 1894	Sherborne, England	1	0	1	While students Webb and Saillard were examining a revolver in a classroom at Sherborne School, the gun accidentally discharged, fatally shooting Saillard.
20 July 1894	Malvern, England	1	0	1	Malvern College student Felix Gabriel Richardson, aged 17, accidentally shot himself to death with a rifle as he cleaned it in his room.
1896
1896	Leighton Buzzard, England	0	1	1	At the Collegiate School, a student named Powell discharged a revolver as he showed it to other students, critically wounding another boy, Collins, in the face.
1898
4 July 1898	Edinburgh, Scotland	1	0	1	15-year-old Andrew Newlands accidentally killed 16-year-old George Sym at Edinburgh Academy.
1899
February 1899	Dulliken, Switzerland	0	0	0	A boy accidentally fired a revolver in a classroom.

== 20th century ==
=== 1900s ===
10 incidents.

Date	Location	Deaths	Injuries	Total	Description
1900
15 September 1900	Kharkov, Russian Empire	1	1	2	After failing an exam, gymnasium student Iwanow shot and killed principal Tschanowitsch with a revolver and also wounded a teacher named Horkiwicz before surrendering to police.
1901
February 1901	Geneva, Switzerland	0	1	1	A student shot and severely wounded a classmate during a lecture at the University of Geneva.
1902
5 February 1902	Scheveningen, Netherlands	0	1	1	At the municipal school, a boy pulled out a revolver and accidentally fired it, wounding a student next to him.
6 October 1902	Droyssig, Austria-Hungary	4	3	7	A 40-year-old teacher shot and killed three students and wounded three others before being lynched by villagers.
1904
30 May 1904	Imola, Italy	0	1	1	A school director shot an administrator in a school cafeteria in front of students.
1905
15 February 1905	Moscow, Russian Empire	2	0	2	A student at a commercial school fatally shot his English teacher and himself.
1906
December 1906	Uznach, Switzerland	0	0	0	A student handling a gun in a classroom accidentally fired a shot.
1908
15 January 1908	Dublin, Ireland	2	1	3	Headmaster Augustus Windsor killed his wife Agnes and daughter Emily in their room at the Coombe Ragged Boys' Home before attempting suicide.
6 October 1908	Samara, Russian Empire	0	0	0	Two students shot at the headmaster of their grammar school, but missed.
1909
3 May 1909	London, England	0	1	1	Gilbert Adams, a student at Alleyn's Grammar School in Dulwich, was accidentally shot in the arm by another student.

=== 1910s ===
12 incidents.

Date	Location	Deaths	Injuries	Total	Description
1910
January 1910	Arbon, Switzerland	1	1	2	A 15-year-old boy shot and wounded a woman at a girls' school before killing himself.
1911
14 March 1911	Cheltenham, England	1	0	1	Cheltenham College student Edward Archer accidentally shot and killed himself on the school firing range.
1912
18 January 1912	Suceava, Austria-Hungary	2	0	2	A 17-year-old student shot and killed his mathematics teacher before killing himself.
July 1912	Odesa, Russian Empire	0	1	1	A 16-year-old student shot and wounded his teacher at the local lyceum.
17 July 1912	Heilbronn, German Empire	0	1	1	An 18-year-old student stabbed himself with a knife in a classroom before shooting at the headmaster and a teacher as they intervened, missing his shots. He then shot himself and was taken to hospital, where he was expected to die.
September 1912	Bürglen, Switzerland	0	1	1	A student accidentally fired his teacher's gun inside a classroom, grazing a classmate.
23 September 1912	Sankt Pölten, Austria-Hungary	1	0	1	Rudolf Hlawat, a student at a gymnasium, shot at his teacher, Prof. Schmidt, with a revolver. He also shot at the school janitor before shooting himself twice in the head. Hlawat died in hospital, the only casualty.
1913
1 February 1913	London, England	0	1	1	16-year-old Frederick Sauri shot and wounded 16-year-old Manuel Coello at Forest House School, Woodford.
May 1913	Porrentruy, Switzerland	0	1	1	As a 12-year-old student relieved himself at a primary school, a 14-year-old classmate shot him with a revolver, wounding him.
20 June 1913	Bremen, Germany	5 (Note: One by falling)	21	26	Bremen school shooting: 29-year-old Heinz Schmidt fired shots inside St Mary's Catholic School, killing four people and wounding 21 others. Another student died accidentally as she evacuated.
9 October 1913	Szeged, Austria-Hungary	1	0	1	After he had been reprimanded by his teacher, Prof. Horvarth, for missing classes, Johann Skultety, a gymnasium student, barged into the classroom and fired with a revolver at the teacher, missing him. He committed suicide by shooting himself in the heart.
15 October 1913	Dublin, Ireland	1	0	1	23-year-old Trinity College Dublin student Edward R.M. Wright accidentally shot himself to death in his room.

=== 1920s ===
12 incidents.

Date	Location	Deaths	Injuries	Total	Description
1921
15 March 1921	Helsinki, Finland	1	0	1	A student brought a gun to a lyceum and accidentally shot another student in the stomach. The victim died in hospital.
1922
March 1922	Därstetten, Switzerland	0	1	1	A student accidentally fired a gun inside a classroom, grazing another student in the leg.
1923
November 1923	Neuchâtel, Switzerland	1	0	1	A student accidentally shot and killed a 21-year-old classmate at a school.
1924
September 1924	See District, Switzerland	0	1	1	A student accidentally fired a gun inside a classroom, wounding a girl.
December 1924	Zeist, Netherlands	0	1	1	A seventh-grade student at the Boys' School of the Brotherhood smuggled a revolver into the school and fired a shot inside a classroom, wounding another student.
1925
6 May 1925	Wilno, Poland	5 (Note: Including two perpetrators)	10	15	Wilno school massacre: 22-year-old Stanisław Ławrynowicz and 21-year-old Janusz Obrąpalski threw grenades and fired guns at their high school, killing three people and wounding ten others. Both assailants died in the attack.
1 July 1925	West Lavington, England	1	0	1	At Dauntsey's School, 15-year-old William John Butler was accidentally shot and killed by another student.
1926
November 1926	Tägerwilen, Switzerland	0	1	1	A student accidentally fired a gun in a classroom, wounding another student.
15 November 1926	Warsaw, Poland	1	1	2	A 19-year-old Stanisław Lampisz, a long-haired student in the third year of the State Secondary Commercial School for Boys in Powiśle, was suspended from school for one week after failing to comply with the orders of the 50-year-old headmaster, Mikołaj Stanisław Lipka, who had instructed students to cut their hair for reasons of hygiene and safety. After the suspension period, Lampisz returned to the school and asked to speak with Headmaster Lipka. When he was informed that the headmaster refused to meet him, Lampisz left the school building and remained in the vicinity. Later, as Lipka was leaving the school, the ambushing 19-year-old fired two shots at him on the staircase, striking him in the head and back. After realizing that Lipka showed no signs of life, Lampisz attempted to commit suicide by shooting himself in the chest with a small-caliber revolver. He survived the attempt and was subsequently sentenced on 26 May 1927 to five years of hard imprisonment.
1928
25 March 1928	Schuinesloot, Netherlands	0	0	0	G. W. Kaemingk, head of the Special School in Schuinesloot, encountered a man outside the school as Kaemingk was heading inside for a school meeting. When the man, who was apparently looking for a person who was not present, became angry and began vandalizing the school doors, Kaemingk went to intervene. The man fired a shot from a revolver, hitting a door, but striking no one. A 21-year-old suspect was detained.
December 1928	Marburg, Germany	0	1	1	A professor at the University of Marburg was shot several times by an unidentified gunman.
1929
February 1929	Hamburg, Germany	1	0	1	At a school in Altona, a student shot another student with a revolver.

=== 1930s ===
17 incidents.

Date	Location	Deaths	Injuries	Total	Description
1930
3 June 1930	Cambridge, England	3	0	3	19-year-old student Douglas Potts shot and killed tutor Sandy Wollaston and fatally wounded policeman Francis Willis before killing himself at King's College, Cambridge.
1931
February 1931	Sulgen, Switzerland	0	1	1	A student accidentally shot another student in a classroom.
5 March 1931	Pristina, Yugoslavia	0	1	1	A student named Ismailović shot and stabbed his teacher several times at a gymnasium after he had been expelled due to low grades. Ismailović was later arrested at a cemetery when he tried to hang himself.
1932
31 January 1932	Riom, France	1	1	2	At a girls' public school, the headmistress's husband fired a revolver, wounding a teacher, before killing himself.
May 1932	Wittlich, Germany	0	0	0	A student shot at a teacher at a secondary school, missing him. Law enforcement confiscated the gun used, and the shooter faced no charges.
10 May 1932	Leissigen, Switzerland	0	1	1	While he was playing with a revolver inside a schoolhouse, a 15-year-old student accidentally fired the gun, severely wounding another boy in the head.
1933
14 September 1933	Radernie, Scotland	0	0	0	A man recklessly shot at Radernie Public School classroom window while school children were inside the classroom.
25 October 1933	Warsaw, Poland	1	11	12	A student was killed and eleven others were wounded in a fight involving knives and guns at the University of Warsaw.
1935
16 September 1935	Palermo, Italy	2	0	2	A 20-year-old student named Maria Concetta Zerilli was shot dead inside the University of Palermo building. Beside her lay the body of a man. The fascist regime, committed to maintain order and security, imposed total censorship on the case. In 2025 Salvo Palazzolo, a journalist for La Repubblica, investigated on this forgotten case. Palazzolo pored over archives and documents, discovering that the girl was involved with a high-ranking member of the regime.
27 December 1935	Belfast, Northern Ireland	0	1	1	Jimmy Steele led an attempted Irish Republican Army raid on Campbell College to secure the arms inside the school Officers' Training Corps. The RUC at Strandtown was tipped off and the raid was unsuccessful. A gun battle took place at the gate lodge on Hawthornden Road in which Constable Ian Hay received five gunshot wounds, but survived.
1936
1 April 1936	Janikowo, Poland	2	2	4	36-year-old retired teacher and reserve officer Stefan Bykowski was dismissed from his position on 1 April 1936 due to poor performance evaluations; after leaving the premises of the two-class Primary School No. 1, he returned in the evening and shot 33-year-old teacher Michalina Kosmowska and the 26-year-old servant Pelagia Zalita, firing four accurate shots at them with a Browning pistol, after which he began firing indiscriminately at witnesses; police officers Dudek and Stefan Strzelczak arrived at the scene, and upon seeing Strzelczak, Bykowski fired two shots, seriously wounding him, then attempted to commit suicide, which was unsuccessful; following his release from prison on 24 September 1936, the proceedings against Bykowski were discontinued, and on 29 September 1936 he was admitted to a psychiatric hospital for the mentally ill, before being officially retired on 29 November 1936.
22 June 1936	Vienna, Austria	1	0	1	Professor Moritz Schlick was killed by former student Johann Nelböck with a revolver at the University of Vienna.
22 December 1936	Bury, England	1	0	1	14-year-old Norman Davis fired a shot inside a classroom at Bury High School, then shot himself to death. His death was ruled an accident, with a coroner's report stating it may have been a prank on the last day of term.
1937
25 January 1937	Nantwich, England	0	1	1	16-year-old student Howard Porter accidentally injured himself in the shin when he fired a revolver at Reaseheath School of Agriculture.
19 February 1937	near Kalinin, Soviet Union	1	0	1	16-year-old 7th-grade student Ilia Ageenko killed teacher Zoia Peshekhovna with a rifle (presumably Berdan rifle) at a village school.
1938
10 October 1938	near Wellington, England	1	0	1	21-year-old Lawry McLaughlan fatally shot himself by accident while practising at a rifle range at Harper Adams Agricultural College.
1939
24 June 1939	Tirpan, Bulgaria	4	0	4	A 15-year-old student killed three teachers with a revolver at a school after being expelled. The boy, who had already been expelled from three other schools during the year for bad behaviour, afterwards committed suicide.

=== 1940s ===
9 incidents.

Date	Location	Deaths	Injuries	Total	Description
1940
17 May 1940	Oxford, England	1	3	4	19-year-old University of Oxford student John Fulljames fired at other students from his window at University College, killing one student and wounding three others.
1945
1945	Edinburgh, Scotland	1	0	1	14-year-old Ian MacDonald died on 1 July of a wound sustained in a shooting accident at Daniel Stewart's College.
16 October 1945	London, England	0	1	1	As teacher Cyril Morris lectured students who had not completed their homework at William Morris School in Walthamstow, a student shot and wounded him. A 13-year-old was arrested.
1946
14 March 1946	London, England	0	1	1	As 19-year-old Bernard McAneny was playing with a revolver during a night class at the Hammersmith School of Arts and Crafts, the gun discharged, wounding 21-year-old Cyril Robinson in the leg.
1947
15 February 1947	Eccleshall, England	1	0	1	Standon Farm School shooting: Nine Standon Farm Approved School students conspired to murder their headteacher and stole rifles from the cadet armoury to do so. A teacher interrupted the burglary, causing one of the boys to shoot and kill him.
23 July 1947	Sneek, Netherlands	1	1	2	A 19-year-old went to a domestic science school to see his fiancée. When she proposed to break off the relationship, the 19-year-old shot her with a revolver, injuring her, before committing suicide.
1948
20 September 1948	Hemingford Grey, England	2	0	2	During school dismissal, 32-year-old Jan Michael Uramowski shot and killed 22-year-old teacher Sheala Anderson on the playground before fatally shooting himself.
1949
9 February 1949	Rotterdam, Netherlands	0	0	0	A pupil fired his father's gun by accident inside a classroom, striking no one.
12 June 1949	Agrigento, Italy	1	0	1	20-year-old student Giuseppe Di Carlo shot and killed a professor in the atrium of the Institute for Surveyors.

=== 1950s ===
14 incidents.

Date	Location	Deaths	Injuries	Total	Description
1952
26 May 1952	London, England	0	1	1	13-year-old Edward Wilson was shot and wounded when a student playing with a pistol at Cassland Road Secondary School in Hackney accidentally discharged the gun.
June 1952	Tilburg, Netherlands	0	1	1	A student fired a revolver in class, shooting another student in the stomach.
1953
16 February 1953	Rome, Italy	1	0	1	16-year-old Giuseppe Conte shot teacher Renzo Modugno after Modugno gave him a poor grade. Modugno died two days later.
1954
18 February 1954	Palermo, Italy	0	1	1	16-year-old Mario Pedi fired shots at teacher Giuseppe Coniglio at a school in Termini Imerese after Coniglio gave Pedi a poor grade. Coniglio was shot in the arm, but survived, while Pedi was arrested.
1955
29 March 1955	Milan, Italy	0	1	1	A 16-year-old student accidentally fired a shot, wounding another student.
1956
10 October 1956	Terrazzano, Italy	1	3	4	Two brothers went into a school carrying guns, dynamite and acid. They took 96 children and three teachers hostage for about six hours. They demanded 200 million lire for the release of their hostages or they would kill them. Using the children as shields, they fired shots at people outside the school. The hostage crisis ended when a teacher restrained the perpetrators. During the crisis, a rescuer was accidentally killed by police gunfire and three other people were shot and wounded.
1957
6 January 1957	Hveragerði, Iceland	1	0	1	Sigurbjörn Ingi Þorvaldsson shot and killed 19-year-old Konkordía Jónatansdóttir, his fiancée, at the State Gardening School.
24 May 1957	Naples, Italy	0	1	1	16-year-old Armando Pisacane shot and wounded teacher Maria Gregorio in their classroom at the "Alessandro Volta" Technical Institute before threatening two janitors with his pistol as he fled. He was sentenced to two years and five months in prison.
1958
11 February 1958	Lyamino, Soviet Union	7	6	13	Lyamino school shooting: 24-year-old Mikhail Tselousov fatally shot seven people and wounded six others at School of Construction N°6 as retaliation for perceived unfair treatment at his workplace. He was sentenced to death and executed one year later.
10 March 1958	Berlin, Germany	1	0	1	A 14-year-old student accidentally killed another student at a school in Kreuzberg.
15 March 1958	Tongeren, Belgium	1	0	1	5-year-old Jean-Perre Slijters shot and killed 5-year-old classmate Jules Cryns with his father's pistol in a classroom. Slijters had taken the gun from his father's van and came to school with the weapon to show his friends.
26 March 1958	Ashington, England	0	1	1	A 13-year-old was grazed by a gunshot in the schoolyard of Hirst Park County Secondary School.
1959
7 April 1959	Rotherham, England	2	0	2	33-year-old lecturer Bernard Walden shot and killed clerk Joyce Moran and former student Neil Saxton in the general office of Rotherham College, reportedly because Moran refused to marry him. He was executed in August 1959.
28 June 1959	Belgrade, Yugoslavia	0	1	1	A student shot and wounded his professor at a technical middle school.

=== 1960s ===
17 incidents.

Date	Location	Deaths	Injuries	Total	Description
1960
2 January 1960	Wageningen, Netherlands	0	1	1	A 33-year-old agricultural college student shot a teacher who he accused of failing him.
1961
4 March 1961	Kungälv, Sweden	1	6	7	Kungälv school shooting: A 17-year-old opened fire at a school dance, killing an 18-year-old and wounding six others.
15 March 1961	Gosfield, England	0	1	1	A teacher at Gosfield School fired a gun in the schoolyard, wounding a student.
28 June 1961	Versailles, France	1	0	1	A 15-year-old student accidentally killed a classmate with his father's pistol.
1962
2 April 1962	Reggio Calabria, Italy	0	0	0	17-year-old Pietro Modafferi, a student at the Scientific High School of Bovo Marina, attempted to shoot his Latin teacher, but the gun jammed. The teacher escaped before Moddafferi cleared the jam and fired three shots into the wall. He was disarmed by a teacher and arrested.
1963
26 January 1963	Naples, Italy	2	0	2	52-year-old teacher Luigi Lambiase shot and killed 35-year-old Olimpia de Rosa in her classroom before killing himself in front of pupils. De Rosa had rejected Lambiase's advances.
19 May 1963	Prijepolje, Yugoslavia	1	0	1	A 16-year-old student fatally shot a 42-year-old teacher who had rejected his reason for being absent from school. The teacher died ten days later.
1964
9 June 1964	Kragujevac, Yugoslavia	1	0	1	25-year-old professor Svetislav Gavrilovic was killed by a 19-year-old student after announcing the gunman had failed the class.
29 June 1964	Cumnor, England	0	0	0	As an intruder broke into a girl's dormitory at a finishing school, a loaded shotgun kept in the area following a prior intrusion was fired, hitting no one. A headmistress and student were treated for blunt injuries, while the intruder escaped.
17 July 1964	Bonn, Germany	2	0	2	A 24-year-old student shot and killed a 21-year-old student at the University of Bonn before committing suicide with cyanide.
20 October 1964	Catania, Italy	1	0	1	A man shot and killed a professor at a teacher training institute, accusing the victim of seducing his daughter.
1965
September 1965	Delémont, Switzerland	0	1	1	A 13-year-old student accidentally fired a revolver during recess, wounding a boy.
1966
27 January 1966	Saint-Jean-de-Monts, France	1	1	2	A 17-year-old expelled student shot and wounded a teacher at a high school before killing himself in the courtyard.
1967
1 November 1967	Dundee, Scotland	1	0	1	Dundee school shooting: Former student Robert Mone took teacher Nanette Hanson and a class of students hostage at St John's Roman Catholic High School. Mone fatally shot Hanson and sexually assaulted two girls before being arrested.
7 November 1967	Varese, Italy	1	0	1	12-year-old Jean-Paul Myttenaer was shot in the head and killed as he and his classmates played in a school courtyard.
1968
16 January 1968	Giengen, Germany	0	2	2	A 19-year-old failing student shot and wounded two teachers at a high school.
11 April 1968	Taurano, Italy	0	1	1	5-year-old Giuseppe Scibelli fired a pistol at his classmate Angelo Venezia in a kindergarten at the religious institute S. Maria delle Grazie, critically wounding him.

=== 1970s ===
23 incidents.

Date	Location	Deaths	Injuries	Total	Description
1971
March 1971	Rome, Italy	0	0	0	An unidentified gunman entered a classroom and ordered the teacher to say "long live the Duce." When the teacher did not, he fired two shots into the floor and fled by climbing the school wall.
1972
1972	Grangemouth, Scotland	0	1	1	16-year-old James Gallacher fired a rifle into a playground at Moray High School, wounding a boy taking driving lessons in the arm.
9 March 1972	Palermo, Italy	0	1	1	17-year-old Gaetano Grippi walked into the "Vittorio Emanuele" classical high school and shot his cousin, 16-year-old Antonella Compagno, before fleeing. Grippi was later arrested, while Compagno was taken to the hospital in critical condition.
9 October 1972	Zadar, Yugoslavia	1	1	2	Zadar school shooting: 19-year-old Milorad Vulinović killed his history teacher and wounded a sociology teacher at Zadar Gymnasium.
20 December 1972	Erlangen, Germany	3 (Note: Two by gunfire)	13	16	University of Erlangen–Nuremberg shooting: A student opened fire with a handgun at the University of Erlangen–Nuremberg, killing two people and wounding two others. Eleven other people were wounded in a fire set by the attacker, who himself died in the fire.
1973
23 January 1973	Milan, Italy	1	0	1	Student Roberto Franceschi was shot and killed during a clash between police and rioters at Bocconi University.
8 February 1973	Genoa, Italy	0	1	1	During riots, Roberto Grassi, a student at the "Giorgi" institute, was shot and wounded as he entered the school by Giuliano Ravera.
1974
2 February 1974	San Luca, Italy	1	0	1	35-year-old Domenico Antonio Pizzata, in charge of after-school activities, shot and killed 53-year-old teacher Silvio Stranges.
25 December 1974	Sofia, Bulgaria	8	8	16	Sofia shooting: A 17-year-old opened fire inside dormitories at Sofia University, killing eight people and wounding eight others before being arrested.
1975
16 October 1975	Heerenveen, Netherlands	0	0	0	A school caretaker found what he thought was a toy gun on the street and brought it to school. The gun went off inside the school, breaking a window.
1976
18 March 1976	Alton, England	0	0	0	A 16-year-old girl took 26 students at Amery Hill School hostage for nearly two hours. As police subdued the hostage-taker, the gun discharged into the ceiling, wounding one student with falling plaster.
30 March 1976	Voghera, Italy	0	2	2	A 15-year-old student brought a gun to school to show to classmates. It discharged in a classroom, wounding two students.
8 December 1976	Pietarsaari, Finland	0	0	0	19-year-old Peter Gustafsson armed with a handgun robbed a bank and engaged in a shootout with the police at a nearby school before taking a student hostage inside the school. The gunman eventually surrendered to the police.
1977
11 March 1977	near Yeovil, England	0	1	1	16-year-old Ian O'Malley was accidentally shot in the stomach at Huish Episcopi Academy. He had brought a shotgun to school for a project.
19 May 1977	Leningrad, Soviet Union	6	3	9	1977 Leningrad shooting: Anatoly Fedorenko killed six cadets and wounded two. He was also injured by one of the fatally wounded cadets. Sentenced to death.
1978
February 1978	Saint-Marcel, France	2	0	2	A 14-year-old student shot and killed his teacher with a pistol in a classroom before fatally shooting himself.
16 March 1978	Istanbul, Turkey	7	41	48	Beyazıt massacre: Seven students were killed and 41 injured in a gun and bomb attack at Istanbul University.
22 June 1978	Sparta, Greece	2	0	2	19-year-old Panagiotis Kakaletris opened fire at a lyceum, killing school principal Giorgos Blesios and gendarme Christos Agrafas. He was arrested the next day.
4 October 1978	Maastricht, Netherlands	0	1	1	A 17-year-old former student at Henric van Veldekecollege shot and wounded the school principal, who knocked the gun out of the shooter's hand before the teenager fled. The shooter surrendered later that day.
1979
1979	Camberley, England	0	0	0	An upset 16-year-old fired a shotgun into a school window.
25 January 1979	Madrid, Spain	0	3	3	Several students were injured, three by gunshots, as multiple far-right extremists attacked the law school of the Complutense University of Madrid.
February 1979	Belgrade, Yugoslavia	1	0	1	A 17-year-old student killed his 27-year-old teacher with his father's pistol inside a classroom.
11 December 1979	Turin, Italy	0	10	10	Members of Prima Linea intruded into a business administration school and briefly took students hostage before singling out five students and five teachers and kneecapping them.

=== 1980s ===
22 incidents.

Date	Location	Deaths	Injuries	Total	Description
1980
12 February 1980	Rome, Italy	1	0	1	Professor Vittorio Bachelet was shot and killed by members of the Red Brigades at the end of a lesson at Sapienza University.
19 March 1980	Milan, Italy	1	0	1	Magistrate Guido Galli was shot to death by Prima Linea members outside a classroom at the University of Milan.
29 April 1980	Madrid, Spain	0	1	1	A student was shot and multiple others assaulted as multiple far-right extremists attacked the law school of the Complutense University of Madrid.
1981
29 May 1981	Rome, Italy	0	1	1	Red Brigades members shot and wounded a teacher at the Centro di Formazione Professionale Teresa Gerini.
1982
30 March 1982	Genoa, Italy	2	0	2	Lamberto Torrini, a middle school teacher, shot and killed 14-year-old student Aurora Cusinatti before killing himself inside a classroom.
1983
3 June 1983	Eppstein, Germany	6	14	20	Eppstein school shooting: 34-year-old Karel Charva fatally shot three students, a teacher and a policeman and injured another 14 people using two semi-automatic pistols, before committing suicide.
21 June 1983	Frimley, England	0	1	1	While Surrey police were practicing shooting with live ammunition, a stray bullet struck 8-year-old Emma Breen as she played at Heather Ridge School, around 1,600 yards (1,500 m) away.
1984
25 January 1984	Cologne, Germany	1	1	2	Sabine S. Gehlhaar opened fire inside a classroom at the University of Cologne's Martin Buber Institute for Jewish Studies, killing professor Hermann Greive and wounding another professor before being overpowered and arrested.
6 March 1984	Bordeaux, France	0	1	1	18-year-old student Frédéric Gayoso shot and wounded another student randomly at Lycee Francois Magendie.
13 March 1984	Castres, France	2	0	2	A 15-year-old student shot and killed a teacher and himself at a private school after the teacher refused the student's explanation for his tardiness.
13 March 1984	Rome, Italy	1	0	1	32-year-old Maurizio Nobile, armed with a sawed-off pump-action shotgun, broke into the Ignazio Silone school and shot and killed 48-year-old caretaker Ernesto Chiovini before taking a teacher and 15 students hostage. After six hours, Nobile surrendered.
1985
27 March 1985	Rome, Italy	1	0	1	Professor Ezio Tarantelli was killed in a parking lot at Sapienza University by members of the Red Brigades.
12 October 1985	Turin, Italy	0	2	2	During a fight at a teacher's training school, a 15-year-old threw his bag, which contained a gun, to the ground; the gun discharged, wounding two students.
1987
7 February 1987	Moscow, Soviet Union	0	1	1	After a school party, a 28-year-old intoxicated teacher invited several students to his office and opened fire, wounding a boy.
March 1987	Bury, England	0	0	0	A teacher at Elton High School fired a shot into the ceiling, resulting in his suspension. He killed himself in September 1987 following a police search of his home relating to the shooting.
10 November 1987	Móstoles, Spain	0	0	0	A 16-year-old fired a shotgun inside his school after threatening his teacher and classmates.
December 1987	Moscow, Soviet Union	1	0	1	Grigory Kuts killed his physical education teacher with a TT pistol after classes.
1988
6 January 1988	Higham Ferrers, England	0	4	4	16-year-old Darren Lloyd Fowler opened fire with a shotgun at The Ferrers School, wounding two teachers and two students. He was detained for life.
15 November 1988	Keele, England	0	1	1	A 21-year-old student accidentally shot himself in the leg in a dormitory at Keele University while cleaning a pistol.
1989
25 January 1989	Rauma, Finland	2	0	2	Raumanmeri school shooting: A 14-year-old student shot and killed two classmates with his father's pistol at the Raumanmeri secondary school.
13 March 1989	Suresnes, France	3	0	3	During an argument between family members during dismissal at Paul-Langevin High School, a man fatally shot his half-brother and half-sister before killing himself.
14 December 1989	Winterthur, Switzerland	0	2	2	While preparing for a presentation on shooting at a vocational school, a student accidentally fired a rifle. The shot penetrated the wall and entered the adjacent classroom, striking two students.

=== 1990s ===
35 incidents.

Date	Location	Deaths	Injuries	Total	Description
1990
25 January 1990	Oberwil, Switzerland	0	1	1	A student brought a handgun to school and accidentally fired it, wounding a classmate.
10 April 1990	Cuneo, Italy	0	1	1	17-year-old Diego Messa was accidentally shot in the locker room of a technical institute as a student showed classmates his grandfather's gun.
27 November 1990	Heraklion, Greece	3	3	6	University of Crete student Giorgos Petrodaskalakis opened fire with a rifle in a lecture hall, killing professors Basilis C. Xanthopoulos and Stephanos Pnevmatikos and wounding three other people before fleeing. He hanged himself in a forest several days later and was discovered in July 1991.
1991
5 March 1991	Bristol, England	0	1	1	15-year-old Andre Crumpton opened fire inside a classroom at Colston's School, wounding housemaster Roderick Findlay before fleeing. Crumpton, who had apparently planned to kill eight people, was imprisoned for five years.
5 October 1991	Ivrea, Italy	0	1	1	A 12-year-old accidentally discharged his uncle's pistol in a classroom, wounding another student.
1992
23 March 1992	Nice, France	1	1	2	20-year-old Fabrice Marsici, a law student, slightly wounded a woman inside a lecture hall before killing himself.
21 May 1992	Amiens, France	1	0	1	20-year-old Alexis Lucet killed a 17-year-old classmate at Lycée Sacré-Cœur.
1 June 1992	Berlin, Germany	1	0	1	A janitor from Kepler High School had an argument with a man who after that the man returned armed and shot the janitor to death at the school.
13 August 1992	Dorum, Germany	1	1	2	41-year-old teacher Eva Lerp-Schulte was shot and killed by her estranged husband in a classroom. A pupil was grazed by gunfire.
1 September 1992	Ylikiiminki, Finland	0	0	0	A man armed with a revolver fired a shot inside the teachers' room and took a student counselor hostage at Ylikiiminki School.
16 October 1992	Angerlo, Netherlands	0	0	0	During a demonstration in a classroom, a policeman accidentally discharged a gun.
1993
6 October 1993	Hausleiten, Austria	1	1	2	A 13-year-old boy shot and wounded his school's principal after being caught smoking. The shooter then killed himself.
1994
2 March 1994	Moscow, Russia	1	2	3	a 17-year-old teenager entered the school number 8 armed with his father's gun and shot Dmitry Fedorov and injured two other students.
4 March 1994	Casal di Principe, Italy	0	0	0	As classmates were mocking a student, he pulled out a gun, which discharged, the shot hitting the wall of the classroom.
9 March 1994	Seixal, Portugal	1	1	2	An eleven-year-old boy, armed with his father's shotgun, shot at the courtyard of the primary school of Foros de Amora in Seixal, fatally hitting 9-year-old student Sérgio Martins and injuring another student.
5 April 1994	Aarhus, Denmark	3	2	5	Aarhus University shooting: A 35-year-old student shot and killed two people and wounded two others in two cafeterias at Aarhus University before killing himself.
24 October 1994	Dulverton, England	0	0	0	A 13-year-old student fired a shotgun several times at Dulverton Middle School before being arrested.
1995
1 February 1995	Geneva, Switzerland	0	0	0	A 22-year-old man took his ex-girlfriend hostage with an assault rifle at a business school. He fired a shot into the ground before a 30-minute standoff with police, ending with the suspect's surrender.
27 October 1995	Saransk, Russia	1	0	1	Professor Oleg Enikeev was teaching in the auditorium of the state university of Moldova when members of an armed gang entered the place and shot him to death.
1996
14 February 1996	Madrid, Spain	1	0	1	A member of ETA shot and killed Autonomous University of Madrid professor Francisco Tomás y Valiente in his office.
13 March 1996	Dunblane, Scotland	18	15	33	Dunblane massacre: 43-year-old Thomas Hamilton opened fire inside Dunblane Primary School, killing sixteen students and a teacher and wounding fifteen other people before killing himself.
14 August 1996	Vladikavkaz,Russia	2	1	3	On 2 August 1996, a disagreement occurred in a restaurant between two men. After 12 days, the two men met in the courtyard of the municipal school number 43 with a woman and another man and the perpetrator shot dead the man who had the conflict and the woman who accompanied them and injured the other.
7 October 1996	Brussels, Belgium	1	0	1	A 15-year-old student armed with a handgun killed a classmate.
1997
7 January 1997	Noisy-le-Sec, France	0	1	1	A 17-year-old student with a rifle shot and wounded another person at Lycée Professionel Moulin Fondu.
9 March 1997	Kamyshin, Russia	6	2	8	Kamyshin school shooting: First year cadet Sergei Lepnev of the Russian Military School opened fire on his commander and classmates, killing six and wounding two.
5 May 1997	Zöbern, Austria	1	1	2	15-year-old Helmut Z. went to his secondary school with a revolver and attempted to sexually assault a classmate. The shooter killed a teacher who intervened and injured a second teacher as he fled.
9 May 1997	Rome, Italy	1	0	1	Killing of Marta Russo: A 22-year-old Sapienza University student was shot and killed on campus. A man was convicted of involuntary manslaughter for the killing.
31 May 1997	Campobasso, Italy	0	1	1	19-year-old Francesco Felicita opened fire inside a classroom at a technical institute for surveyors, wounding another student. He was disarmed by a policeman.
1998
31 March 1998	Tourcoing, France	1	0	1	18-year-old Hassan Atrane was shot in the head by classmate Foued Zarati at Lycée Gambetta; he died the following day. Zarati said that Atrane had told him to fire a shot at him, saying the safety catch was on.
17 June 1998	Bryanston, England	0	1	1	Bryanston School student Michael Hobbes was shot in the chest on the school's firing range during an A-level physics experiment to calculate the speed of a bullet.
1999
11 January 1999	St. Gallen, Switzerland	1	0	1	A student's father shot and killed teacher Paul Spirig in a conference room at the Engelwies Realschule.
5 March 1999	Padua, Italy	3	1	4	A technician at the University of Padua opened fire on his bosses during a case meeting, killing one and wounding three (one person was grazed). Two of the wounded victims died of their injuries five and six years after the shooting.
3 June 1999	St. Petersburg, Russia	1	1	2	An armed man entered the pediatric medicine academy of the SAN Petersburg in the administrative block of the university and shot and killed a guard and injured an employee.
5 October 1999	Zagreb, Croatia	1	2	3	A man entered the school where his family members were and in the room where he was having a parents' meeting and killed a 38-year-old woman Ante Čuljak and injured another woman and his son at Sesvete Elementary School.
7 December 1999	Veghel, Netherlands	0	5	5	A 17-year-old student opened fire in a computer room at ROC De Leijgraaf in an attempted honor killing, wounding a teacher and four students.

== 21st century ==
=== 2000s ===
40 incidents.

Date	Location	Deaths	Injuries	Total	Description
2000
16 March 2000	Brannenburg, Germany	1	1	2	A 57-year-old director was shot by a 16-year-old student and later died in hospital. The student attempted suicide by shooting himself and went into a coma.
5 June 2000	Kristansend, Norway	2	0	2	A 33-year-old man who was a school teacher shot and killed a 28-year-old woman who he had a relationship with in the garage of the Kvadraturen videregående skole school, then committed suicide.
22 November 2000	Vienna, Austria	1	0	1	A man shot and killed a 38-year-old employee in the rectory of the University of Vienna.
24 November 2000	Pisa, Italy	1	1	2	Fabio Ciaralli shot and stabbed his ex-wife Barbara Novelli to death in her classroom at the University of Pisa before attempting suicide by stabbing himself.
2001
18 January 2001	Stockholm, Sweden	1	0	1	16-year-old Nicola Vasmatzis was shot and killed in a restroom by a 19-year-old student at Bromma secondary school.
9 March 2001	Sisak, Croatia	0	2	2	15-year-old student fired a Zastava M48 military rifle inside a classroom wounding a teacher & a student before holding classmates hostage.
19 May 2001	Pinerolo, Italy	2	0	2	38-year-old Grant Dunn, an English teacher at the Marie Curie Lycee, shot and killed 19-year-old student Emanuela Ferro, who he had a romantic interest in, in the school car park. Dunn shot himself to death at the scene.
8 June 2001	Varaždin, Croatia	2	0	2	A student shot dead his geography teacher Josip Medvedović in the courtyard of the Secondary School of Mining and Chemistry, Varaždin and committed suicide.
12 June 2001	Split, Croatia	0	0	0	Student fired a handgun in class after receiving a failing grade; nobody was hit.
16 December 2001	Kluczbork, Poland	2	1	3	A 62-year-old retired teacher, former headmaster of another school and hunter, Kazimierz J., during a break when the third lesson of a private post-secondary economic school was taking place at Vocational School Complex No. 1 named after Maria Skłodowska-Curie in Kluczbork, began a conversation with his 42-year-old wife, Joanna J. An argument broke out between them. After the argument, Kazimierz J. took out a kniejówka and fired one shot at Joanna, fatally wounding her in the left thigh. The perpetrator then ran out of the school and went to his car, from where he fired two shots at 37-year-old railway worker Marek Laszczyński, who was approaching from the schoolyard to help her. Laszczyński was shot in the abdomen and neck and died at the scene. Afterwards, the hunter got out of the car and committed suicide in the school courtyard by shooting himself in the head. As established during the investigation, the retired man suspected Laszczyński of having an affair with his wife, but it was later determined that there was no relationship between them.
2002
19 February 2002	Freising/Eching, Germany	4	1	5	Eching and Freising shootings: Adam Labus, 22 years old, armed himself with a pistol and homemade bombs. Labus went to his company where he previously worked in a taxi and shot two employees; the manager died at the scene and the foreman succumbed to his injuries later. Labus took the taxi again to go to a business school, where he killed the director and shot a teacher before shooting himself in the head and dying.
26 April 2002	Erfurt, Germany	17	1	18	Erfurt school massacre: 19-year-old expelled student Robert Steinhäuser shot and killed 16 people, including a policeman, before killing himself.
29 April 2002	Vlasenica, Bosnia and Herzegovina	2	1	3	Vlasenica school shooting: A 17-year-old student shot and killed his history professor and wounded his math professor before killing himself at Vlasenica High School.
10 October 2002	Lyubertsy, Russia	1	2	3	An armed man shot and killed principal Vadim Menis in the courtyard of school No. 10 and injured an employee and another man.
2003
May 2003	Schlosswil, Switzerland	0	1	1	As a pensioner fired a gun at crows in his field to scare them away, a bullet struck an 8-year-old student playing in a schoolyard.
2 July 2003	Coburg, Germany	1	1	2	Coburg shooting: A 16-year-old student shot and wounded his teacher before shooting himself dead.
25 August 2003	Hamina, Finland	0	0	0	A 17-year-old student fired a gun multiple times while barricaded on the roof of Vehkalahti Upper Secondary School. He surrendered to police.
2004
13 January 2004	The Hague, Netherlands	1	0	1	16-year-old student Murat Demir killed deputy director Hans van Wieren in the canteen of Terra College.
18 May 2004	Wasserleben, Germany	2	0	2	A man shot and killed his ex's current husband in the courtyard of the Grundschule Wasserleben school and committed suicide.
September 2004	Beslan, Russia	365-731	800+	1134+	Beslan school hostage crisis: Members of the Riyad-us Saliheen Brigade of Martyrs occupied a school and took students and faculty hostage. On the third day, Russian forces stormed the school. At least 334 people were killed and over 800 injured.
2005
7 March 2005	Rötz, Germany	0	0	0	A 14-year-old fired a gun at his teacher in a classroom before being overpowered by the teacher and arrested. No one was hurt.
22 April 2005	Tempo, Northern Ireland	0	1	1	An elderly man shot and wounded 5-year-old Darragh Somers as he was on the playground of St Patrick's Primary School.
22 June 2005	Orléans, France	1	0	1	A 22-year-old student at the University of Orléans killed a 20-year-old woman he was infatuated with in a classroom before fleeing. He was arrested close to the school.
12 July 2005	Bologna, Italy	1	0	1	32-year-old Domenico Bottari shot and killed 22-year-old student Riccardo Venier at the University of Bologna after he refused Bottari's advances.
23 December 2005	Yaroslavl, Russia	1	0	1	A businessman was shot dead in the courtyard of school number 36.
2006
20 November 2006	Emsdetten, Germany	1	8	9	Emsdetten school shooting: A student opened fire at his former school, wounding eight people by gunfire before killing himself. Twenty-nine people were injured when the shooter detonated smoke grenades as he roamed the building.
2007
11 March 2007	Loughborough, England	0	1	1	A man was shot in the abdomen after an argument at a concert hosted by Loughborough University.
6 July 2007	Kusel, Germany	1	1	2	Michael B., a 24-year-old man suffering from cancer, met at the bus stop with his ex-girlfriend, a 16-year-old student who didn't want to talk to him and ran away to school. Michael chased the student and shot her in the thigh while she was at the entrance to the institution. The teachers who realized what happened chased Michael and, when Michael realized this, he shot himself in the head with his pistol and died in the hospital.
7 November 2007	Jokela, Finland	9	1	10	Jokela school shooting: 18-year-old student Pekka-Eric Auvinen opened fire inside Jokela High School, killing six students and two faculty members and wounding another person before fatally shooting himself.
2008
22 May 2008	Khasavyurt, Russia	1	0	1	School principal Budun Sharapudinov was shot dead by a man in the schoolyard when he arrived for work.
23 September 2008	Kauhajoki, Finland	11	1	12	Kauhajoki school shooting: 22-year-old student Matti Juhani Saari shot and killed ten people and wounded another at the Kauhajoki School of Hospitality before fatally shooting himself. Police determined he was inspired by the Jokela High School shooting.
29 September 2008	Santarém, Portugal	1	0	1	A public security police agent shot and killed his 29-year-old wife Amélia Pais in the kindergarten facilities of the Association of Parents and Friends of the Mentally Disabled Citizen (APPACDM), the case occurred in front of the 7-year-old couple's son.
2009
7 January 2009	Budapest, Hungary	2	1	3	A principal and teacher were shot to death and a security guard wounded at a private primary school. The security guard and the finance director of the school, who had both recently been fired, were arrested.
23 January 2009	Tromsø, Norway	2	0	2	A man shot and killed a female trainee teacher and then fatally shot himself in the car park of a kindergarten. The shooting occurred just as children were arriving for school.
11 March 2009	Winnenden/Wendlingen, Germany	16	9	25	Winnenden school shooting: A former student opened fire at Albertville-Realschule and fled in a stolen car, where he opened fire at a car dealership. He killed himself in a shootout after being shot by police. In total, the perpetrator killed fifteen people and wounded nine others.
March 17, 2009	Udmurtia, Russia	1	0	1	A teacher at the Vocational School No. 34 shot and killed a co-worker in the school's carpentry workshop.
10 April 2009	Athens, Greece	1	3	4	OAED Vocational College shooting: A 19-year-old vocational school student opened fire inside the school and wounded a student. He wounded two people as he ran away before killing himself nearby.
16 April 2009	Vladikavkaz, Russia	1	0	1	An armed man entered High School 26 and shot his ex-wife to death in the school's computer room.
28 April 2009	Harstad, Norway	0	0	0	A 9-year-old student at Kanebogen primary school fired a shotgun twice in the playground before his gun was taken away by a teacher. No one was hurt.
26 November 2009	Pécs, Hungary	1	3	4	A 23-year-old student at the University of Pécs opened fire during a lecture, killing a student and wounding three other people before fleeing and surrendering at a local clinic.

=== 2010s ===
30 incidents.

Date	Location	Deaths	Injuries	Total	Description
2010
12 February 2010	Amadora, Portugal	1	0	1	A cadet accidentally shot another cadet, 21-year-old Pedro Joel Delgado, in the facilities of the Amadora military academy.
11 May 2010	Elbasan, Albania	2	0	2	19-year-old Endrit Llabaj shot and killed his 18-year-old girlfriend Gerta Baja at Mahir Domi High School. He killed himself as police pursued him on the outskirts of Elbasan.
2011
January 2011	Torre del Greco, Italy	0	1	1	59-year-old Fabrizio Panaro was shot and wounded by unidentified gunmen while working in the courtyard of the Domenico Morelli middle school. Students were present at the school, some in the courtyard.
29 April 2011	Saransk, Russia	1	0	1	a 54-year-old man shot and killed a 14-year-old student in the courtyard of school number 34.
2012
19 March 2012	Toulouse, France	4	4	8	Toulouse and Montauban shootings: 23-year-old Mohammed Merah opened fire at a Jewish day school in an Islamic terrorist attack, killing a rabbi and three children and wounding four other people. Merah was killed by police on 22 March.
30 March 2012	Orivesi, Finland	0	0	0	A 23-year-old man fired two shots with a flare gun, hitting his ex-girlfriend's father in the arm in an office building. After the incident, he left and drove to Orivesi High School, took his rifle, and went to the third floor, apparently after his ex-girlfriend. He then knocked on the door to the classroom and tried to shoot the teacher who opened the door, but the gunman's rifle didn't fire and the teacher was able to shut the door. The gunman then fired four rounds through the door but did not hit anyone. He was apprehended by police outside the school and the gunman dropped his rifle.
22 May 2012	Memmingen, Germany	0	0	0	A 14-year-old stole three of his father's firearms and fired multiple shots at school and on a sports field, striking no one. He surrendered after a several-hour standoff.
25 May 2012	Sankt Pölten, Austria	2	0	2	An armed 37-year-old man entered Volksschule Wagram and walked his two children out of the classroom. His 7-year-old daughter managed to escape unscathed, but he took his 8-year-old son to a cloakroom and shot him in the head. The father then fled from the school grounds in his car, and later killed himself after he crashed the car on a local farm road. The most likely motive for his actions is that he wanted to get revenge on his wife. The 8-year-old died two days later.
4 September 2012	Parempuyre, France	0	0	0	After two assailants assaulted a man outside the Jean-Jaurès primary school and fired a shot, the man ran inside the school courtyard. An attacker followed and fired two shots, one in the air and another at the school. The attackers were arrested.
25 December 2012	Nalchik, Russia	1	0	1	Armed men entered the dean's office at the State Agrarian University of Kabardino-Balkaria and shot Boris Zherukov to death
2013
24 April 2013	Stara zagora, Bulgaria	1	0	1	Sports school carpenter Todor Kableshkov was shot dead in the school yard.
15 June 2013	Vittoria, Italy	1	0	1	A school janitor shot and killed 54-year-old teacher Giovanna Nobile at the Istituto Comprensivo "F.Pappalardo". He attempted to flee the scene, but was tackled by another teacher and arrested.
4 December 2013	Shkozet, Albania	1	0	1	A 17-year-old student, named as Endrin Baraku killed a 15-year-old classmate with an automatic rifle at Beqir Cela High School. He surrendered in Durrës.
2014
8 January 2014	Pristina, Kosovo	1	1	2	Two men were arrested after a 14-year-old was shot and killed and another teenager wounded in the yard of the "Emin Duraku" school.
3 February 2014	Moscow, Russia	2	1	3	2014 Moscow school shooting: A 15-year-old student killed his teacher and held his class hostage before shooting two policemen, one fatally, as they arrived at the scene. The shooter eventually surrendered and was apprehended.
27 October 2014	Viljandi, Estonia	1	0	1	A 15-year-old student shot and killed Ene Sarap, his German language teacher at the Paalalinna School. Four other students were also present during the shooting. In 2015, he was sentenced to nine years in prison.
2015
23 April 2015	Istanbul, Turkey	0	2	2	A 19-year-old man fired at two students in a schoolyard, wounding them.
6 June 2015	Bijeljina, Bosnia and Herzegovina	1	0	1	a young man was shot dead in the courtyard of the elementary school knez Ivo od semberije by another boy.
30 November 2015	Saratov, Russia	1	2	3	during the karate class in a sport club at school № 62 a man armed with an illegally owned pistol shot dead another man, the 48-year-old Azamat Normanov, and wounded two others.
2016
17 October 2016	Togliatti, Russia	1	0	1	a man was shot dead in the courtyard of school number 74
2017
16 March 2017	Grasse, France	0	4	4	Grasse school shooting: A 16-year-old fired shots at Alexis de Tocqueville high school, wounding four people. Anti-terrorist commandos were sent to the scene and the shooter was arrested.
2018
29 January 2018	Nazaré, Portugal	1	0	1	A 40-year-old man fired shots in a schoolyard during a dispute between two families, killing a man. The incident occurred during school hours and students were present in the schoolyard at the time.
9 May 2018	Mistelbach, Austria	0	1	1	18-year-old Mario S. fired a shotgun at the Mistelbach school centre, wounding a 19-year-old. The gun jammed after the first shot, causing the shooter to flee. He was imprisoned for six years and committed to psychiatric care.
October 11, 2018	Uralmash, Russia	2	0	2	A man shot and killed his wife in the kindergarten facilities of number 371 after he committed suicide.
17 October 2018	Kerch, Crimea (Note: Russia (de facto), Ukraine (de jure))	21	73	94	Kerch Polytechnic College massacre: 18-year-old student Vladislav Roslyakov detonated a bomb inside Kerch Polytechnic College before opening fire on people. Twenty people were killed and 67 others wounded before the shooter killed himself.
18 December 2018	Rotterdam, Netherlands	1	0	1	A 31-year-old man shot and killed a 16-year-old girl in the bike rack that is on the grounds of the Rotterdam Faculty of Design.
2019
22 January 2019	Moissy-Cramayel, France	0	0	0	A 7-year-old student fired a gun in the playground at Grès elementary school, causing no injuries.
27 May 2019	Brześć Kujawski, Poland	0	2	2	An 18-year-old armed attacker, Marek Nowak, a former student of Primary School No. 1 named after Władysław Łokietek, arrived at the school and shot 11-year-old Oliwia Gorzycka three times, injuring her in the abdomen and back; she was also struck in the head by a firecracker. A 59-year-old school caretaker was also injured after being shot three times, with one bullet hitting her in the abdomen. The attack was stopped by school janitor Krzysztof Gorzycki, who managed to disarm Nowak, preventing further casualties. According to available information, Nowak had been undergoing psychiatric treatment and was fascinated by school attackers. On 20 September 2022, he was sentenced to 25 years of imprisonment; on 13 June 2023, the sentence was modified, allowing him to apply for conditional release after 20 years.
4 September 2019	Brest, France	0	0	0	During a brawl at the entrance of Dupuy-de-Lôme High School, someone fired a gun, striking nobody.
22 November 2019	Velika Plana, Serbia	0	0	0	46-year-old Goran Todorović, armed with a rifle, entered the Economics and Tourism School "Vuk Karadžić" and took a class hostage. He was overpowered by a teacher, firing two shots in the process.

=== 2020s ===
32 incidents.

Date	Location	Deaths	Injuries	Total	Description
2020
15 May 2020	Erdevik, Serbia	2	0	2	A man shot and killed the school principal and the school driver at Sava Šumanović elementary school,
2021
11 May 2021	Kazan, Russia	9	23	32	Kazan school shooting: 19-year-old former student Ilnaz Galyaviev killed nine people and wounded 23 others at Gymnasium N°175. He left the school as police arrived and was arrested.
20 September 2021	Perm, Russia	6	24	30	Perm State University shooting: 18-year-old student Timur Bekmansurov opened fire at Perm State University, killing six people and wounding 23 others before being shot by police and arrested.
13 October 2021	Leioa, Spain	0	0	0	A young man fired shots at the University of the Basque Country, hitting no one, before being arrested.
18 October 2021	Oktyabrsky, Russia	0	1 (indirectly)	1	A sixth-grader brought a gun into his school and fired two shots at a wall and a fiberglass door. An 11-year-old student was injured by shards of broken glass. The school principal convinced the shooter to give her the gun, after which the gunman was detained.
22 October 2021	San Severo, Italy	0	1	1	An 83-year-old man fired a pistol in the courtyard of the 'Petrarca-Padre Pio' secondary school, wounding a janitor in the head. The shooter, who claimed that he had fired by accident, was charged with attempted murder.
2022
24 January 2022	Heidelberg, Germany	2	3	5	Heidelberg University shooting: An 18-year-old student opened fire with a rifle and shotgun in a lecture hall at Heidelberg University, killing one person and wounding three others before killing himself.
26 April 2022	Veshkayma, Russia	5	1	6	Veshkayma kindergarten shooting: A 26-year-old man killed a man in woods before stealing his victim's gun and firing shots at a kindergarten, killing two children and a staff member and wounding another staff member. The shooter killed himself.
26 September 2022	Izhevsk, Russia	19	23	42	Izhevsk school shooting: A 34-year-old man shot at people inside his former school, killing eighteen people and wounding 23 others before killing himself.
2023
5 February 2023	near Epsom, England	3	0	3	39-year-old George Pattinson shot and killed his 45-year-old wife Emma, the headteacher of Epsom College, and their 7-year-old daughter Lettie before killing himself at their home in school grounds.
3 May 2023	Belgrade, Serbia	10	6	16	Belgrade school shooting: 13-year-old Kosta Kecmanović fired randomly at students and staff at Vladislav Ribnikar Model Elementary School, killing nine students and a security guard and wounding six other people before surrendering.
11 May 2023	Maggia, Switzerland	1	0	1	A school janitor was killed in the courtyard of his workplace by a man at the Centro Scolastico Ronchini school.
14 June 2023	Lukavac, Bosnia and Herzegovina	0	1	1	2023 Lukavac school shooting: A former student shot and wounded a teacher in the Lukavac Elementary School.
8 September 2023	Lohr am Main, Germany	1	0	1	A 14-year-old was shot dead on the grounds of the Staatliche Realschule Lohr am Main at Schulzentrum Lohr am Main.
28 September 2023	Rotterdam, Netherlands	1	0	1	2023 Rotterdam shootings: After killing a mother and daughter at a residence, a 32-year-old man shot and killed a teacher at the Erasmus University Medical Center. The shooter was arrested.
27 October 2023	Balatonföldvár, Hungary	0	0	0	A hunter took a rifle to his son's school, where his son accidentally fired the weapon in a classroom.
9 November 2023	Offenburg, Germany	1	0	1	Mateja Z., a 15-year-old student, shot twice at a classmate of the same age who died in the hospital. The student was talked into dropping the weapon by an adult and was arrested.
7 December 2023	Bryansk, Russia	2	5	7	Bryansk school shooting: A 14-year-old girl opened fire inside a classroom with a shotgun, killing another student and wounding five people before killing herself.
21 December 2023	Prague, Czech Republic	15	25	41	2023 Prague shootings: After killing his father at their home, 24-year-old student David Kozák opened fire inside the Faculty of Arts building at Charles University, killing thirteen people and wounding 25 others before killing himself. Another student fell to her death as she hid from the shooter.
2024
2 April 2024	Vantaa, Finland	1	2	3	Viertola school shooting: A bullied 12-year-old student shot at three other students in the Viertola school, killing a boy and wounding two girls. The shooter was arrested in Siltamäki, Helsinki.
7 May 2024	Istanbul, Turkey	1	0	1	Murder of Ibrahim Oktugan: Principal Ibrahim Oktugan was shot and killed by a 17-year-old expelled student.
21 August 2024	Sanski Most, Bosnia and Herzegovina	3	1	4	Sanski Most school shooting: 50-year-old janitor Mehmed Vukalić allegedly shot and killed three other employees of the Sanski Most Gymnasium before shooting himself. He survived his wound and was arrested.
4 September 2024	Stockholm, Sweden	0	1	1	Trångsund school shooting: A 14-year-old student was shot in the head by a 15-year-old classmate inside a school toilet at Trångsundsskolan. The victim survived with serious injuries. The perpetrator was arrested the same day and later sentenced to two years and two months of closed youth care for attempted murder, gross weapons offences, and conspiracy to commit murder.
16 October 2024	Istanbul, Turkey	0	0	0	34-year-old teacher Serdar Alagöz, armed with a gun and three knives, attempted to shoot the assistant principal at a school in Etiler, but his gun jammed. He fired his gun as he fled, but no one was injured. He was arrested by responding police.
7 November 2024	Saint-Florent-sur-Auzonnet, France	0	0	0	A man allegedly threatened his ex-partner with a knife outside a school during dismissal. The ex-partner's father fired a shot at the man that struck the school gate. Both men were arrested.
2025
4 February 2025	Örebro, Sweden	11	5	17	Örebro school shooting: A former student opened fire with multiple weapons at Campus Risbergska, killing ten people and wounding five others. The shooter killed himself.
5 February 2025	The Hague, Netherlands	1	0	1	A 16-year-old student at Hofstad Lyceum who was paid to shoot a person in the legs accidentally shot himself dead in a school toilet.
21 May 2025	Pozuelo de Alarcón, Spain	1	0	1	Andriy Portnov, 52, a former advisor to former Ukrainian President Viktor Yanukovych, was shot dead by unknown assailants in a car while dropping off his children at the entrance of an American school in Pozuelo. Andriy was fatally shot in the back and head, and the attackers subsequently fled the scene into a wooded area. The attack is suspected to have been motivated by a settling of scores.
10 June 2025	Graz, Austria	11	11	22	2025 Graz school shooting: A former student opened fire at the Bundes-Oberstufenrealgymnasium Dreierschützengasse, killing at least ten people and wounding 11 others before killing himself.
30 August 2025	Istanbul, Turkey	2	0	2	A 20-year-old man shot and killed a 15-year-old girl in a café on the campus of Boğaziçi University before committing suicide.
2026
11 February 2026	Anapa, Russia	1	2	3	2026 Anapa college shooting: A 17-year-old student shot and killed a security guard at a technical college and injured two people and after that was arrested.
12 October 2026	Aubagne, France	0	3	3	2026 Aubagne school shooting: A 14-year-old student shot and wounded three employees before being subdued.

== See also ==
School attacks in European countries:

- List of school attacks in Finland
- List of school attacks in Germany
- List of school attacks in Russia, including events that occurred in Siberia and other Asian parts of Russia, such as the Blagoveshchensk college shooting
- List of school attacks in Turkey, including events in the Asian part of Turkey like the Eskisehir University shooting
- List of school attacks in the United Kingdom

Other lists of school shootings:

- List of school shootings in Australia
- List of school shootings in Canada
- List of school shootings in the United States (before 2000)
- List of school shootings in the United States (2000–present)
