= Patrikeyevo =

Patrikeyevo (Russian: Патрикеево) may refer to several rural localities in Russia:

- Patrikeyevo, Kovrovsky District, Vladimir Oblast, village in Novoselskoye Rural Settlement, Kovrovsky District, Vladimir Oblast
- Patrikeyevo, Sudogodsky District, Vladimir Oblast, village in Golovinskoye Rural Settlement, Sudogodsky District, Vladimir Oblast
