= University of Erlangen–Nuremberg shooting =

1972 crime in Erlangen, Germany

- Location: 49.5986°N 11.0154°E; University of Erlangen–Nuremberg, Erlangen, West Germany
- Date: 20 December 1972
- Target: Students and staff of the Zoological Institute
- Attack type: School shooting, mass shooting, arson
- Weapon: Pistol
- Deaths: 3 (including the perpetrator)
- Injuries: 13
- Perpetrator: Robert Kausler
- Motive: Rejection by his former fiancée

The University of Erlangen–Nuremberg shooting was a school shooting and arson attack that occurred on 20 December 1972 at the University of Erlangen–Nuremberg in Erlangen, Bavaria, West Germany. Robert Kausler, a 27-year-old zoology student, opened fire at the university before setting fire to the institute. Two people were killed and thirteen others were injured. Kausler also died in the fire.

One of the victims was Frieda Goesswein, a student and Kausler's former fiancée.

== Background ==
The University of Erlangen–Nuremberg was founded by Margrave Friedrich of Brandenburg-Bayreuth, with its official opening taking place in Erlangen on 4 November 1743. It was renamed Friedrich-Alexander-Universität in 1769 in honour of Margrave Alexander of Brandenburg-Ansbach. The name "Erlangen-Nürnberg" was added in 1961 following the incorporation of the Nuremberg Commercial College for Business and Social Science.

In 1972, Robert Kausler was a 27-year-old student of zoology at the university. He had previously been engaged to Frieda Goesswein, who had ended their relationship before the attack. Reports described the attack in the context of the failed relationship, with the Hamburger Abendblatt attributing the deaths to "rejected love" and The Times describing Kausler as a "jilted" student.

== Attack ==
=== Shooting ===
Kausler entered a classroom of the Zoological Institute while students were waiting for the arrival of a professor to begin a lesson. He suddenly drew a pistol and opened fire, initially shooting at Goesswein and the people around her. As students attempted to flee, Kausler continued firing at them, changing the magazine of the weapon several times.

Goesswein was fatally shot in the heart. Another student, Karin Pikos, was also killed in the shooting.

=== Arson ===
After the shooting, Kausler set fire to the institute. The building was completely destroyed by the resulting fire. Kausler remained inside and died in the flames, his burned body was found alongside those of the two victims.

== Victims ==
Two people were killed during the attack, both of them being students of the institute. One of them was Frieda Goesswein, a student and Kausler's former fiancée. She was shot in the heart and died from her wounds.

Another student, Karin Pikos, was also killed in the shooting.

Thirteen other people were injured in the attack, with six of the injured reported to be in serious condition.

== Aftermath ==
The fire completely destroyed the Zoological Institute.

The institute continued its academic work after the attack. A paper published in June 1973 listed the II. Zoologisches Institut der Universität Erlangen-Nürnberg as its authors affiliation. Later publications from 1976 and 1977 listed the Zoological Institute at Bismarckstr. 10 in Erlangen.

== See also ==
- University of Erlangen–Nuremberg
- List of mass shootings in Germany
- List of school shootings in Germany
- List of school shootings in Europe
