= Grachov murder case =

1925 Soviet spree killing

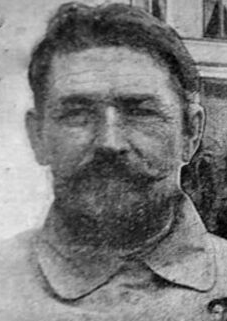
- A photo of Grachov from his trial
- Location: 57.9998°N 41.4944°E; Ivankovo, Sudislavsky District, Kostroma Governorate, RSFSR, Soviet Union
- Date: 26 July 1925
- Target: Villagers
- Attack type: Mass shooting, arson
- Weapons: Double-barreled shotgun; Fire
- Deaths: 11
- Injuries: 8
- Perpetrator: Grigory Grachov
- Motive: Resentment at land redistribution results, long-standing feud

The Grachov murder case was a spree killing that occurred on 26 July 1925 in Ivankovo, Sudislavsky District, Kostromskoy Uyezd, Kostroma Governorate, RSFSR, Soviet Union. Grigory Grachov, embittered by a long-time conflict with other villagers, set a fire to lure them into an ambush before opening fire, killing 11 and wounding 8.

== Background ==
Following the 1917 October Revolution, Vladimir Lenin declared the Decree on Land, which abolished private property and redistributed land among peasants. However, during the land redistribution process, Grigory Timofeevich Grachov (Note: Grachov was mistakenly referred to as Peter Grachov or Peter Grachoff in contemporary Western sources.) (Russian: Григорий Тимофеевич Грачев), a peasant from the village of Ivankovo, was unable to secure a particular plot of land he had been wanting, losing out to a neighboring farmer. It was the last straw in the long-lasting conflict with the co-villagers. Believing that he had not received his fair share, he began plotting revenge. Grachov had been previously accused of murder but was acquitted.

== Event ==
After selling all of his property and belongings and reportedly sending his wife to her relatives for a vacation, on the 26th of July Grigory Grachov burned down his neighbors' houses while they were working in the field. He then lay in wait to ambush them on their return to the village. When the peasants returned to put out the fires, Grachov shot at them, ultimately killing 11 people and injuring eight others. He additionally shot at the firefighters who arrived from a nearby town to put out the fires, before turning on the town's livestock and killing 8–12 horses. By the end of the massacre, 13 of the 14 households in Ivankovo had been burned to the ground.

== Aftermath ==
Following the attack, Grachov fled the scene, but was later caught by the local state militia. He was found to be mentally competent during his trial and was sentenced to 20 years in prison. He was released after serving 10 years, a mistake by officials as he was not subject to early release. His further life is unknown, though he was banned from living in Ivankovo for four years.

== See also ==
- List of mass shootings in the Soviet Union
