= Alan Johnston, Lord Johnston =

Alan Charles Macpherson Johnston, PC (13 January 1942 – 14 June 2008) was a Senator of the College of Justice in Scotland until his death in 2008 at the age of 66. He was appointed in 1994. He served as chairman of the Scottish Division of the Employment Appeal Tribunal from 1996 to 2005.

== Life ==
He was born in Stirling in central Scotland on 13 January 1942 the son of Alastair McPherson Johnston, Lord Dunpark (1915–1991). He was educated at Edinburgh Academy and Loretto College before winning a place to study law at Jesus College, Cambridge. He returned to Scotland to study Scottish Law at Edinburgh University and then trained as an advocate, passing the Bar in 1967.

He was Standing Junior Counsel to the Scottish Home and Health Department from 1974 to 1979 and served as an Advocate Depute from 1979 to 1982. He was appointed Queen's Counsel in 1980.

Lord Johnston was a chairman of Industrial Tribunals (1982–85) and of Medical Appeal Tribunals (1985–89). He was the treasurer (1977–89) and subsequently dean (1989–94) of the Faculty of Advocates.

Lord Johnston also received an honorary doctorate from Heriot-Watt University in 2001

Lord Johnston was seriously criticised for nor recusing himself for judging an appeal on a case originally judged by his father Lord Dunpark, where he clearly had a biased in the case.

He died in his home near Kelso in the Scottish Borders on 14 June 2008.

== Positions of note ==
- Dean and treasurer of the Faculty of Advocates
- Chairman of Industrial Tribunals in Scotland 1982 to 1985
- Chairman of the Medical Appeals Tribunal in Scotland 1985 to 1989
- Chairman of the Employment Appeal Tribunal in Scotland 1996 to 2005

== Family ==
He married Anthea Blackburn in 1966. They had three sons together.
