= Nanette Hanson =

British teacher (1941–1967)

Nanette Hanson AM
- Born: 1941; Bradford, Yorkshire, England
- Died: 1 November 1967 (aged 26); St John's Roman Catholic High School, Dundee, Scotland
- Occupation: Teacher
- Known for: Died defending children in her care, recipient of the Albert Medal

Nanette Hanson AM (1941 – 1 November 1967) was a British teacher at St John's Roman Catholic High School, Dundee, Scotland. She talked down Robert Mone during an armed siege, before being fatally wounded by him, and is credited with saving the lives of the twelve girls in her class for which she was posthumously awarded the Albert Medal.

== Personal life ==
Nanette Hanson was born in 1941, in Bradford, Yorkshire, the daughter of George (a police superintendent) and Mary Hall. In May 1967 she married Guy Hanson in Bradford, and the couple moved to Dundee, where Nanette had got a job teaching at St John's School. She is buried in St John's Churchyard, Ben Rhydding, Ilkley, Yorkshire.

== Murder ==
Hanson was taking a needlework class of twelve girls when Robert Mone, a soldier armed with a shotgun, entered her classroom. He told the girls to barricade the doors and herded them into a fitting room. He fired several rounds at the classroom door. Hanson engaged him in conversation and he asked for an acquaintance, Marion Young, to be brought to the school. Mone attempted to shoot Hanson, raped one of the girls and sexually assaulted another. Eventually, the two women persuaded him to let the girls go. Hanson and Young attempted to get him to give himself up, but at about 4.30pm he told Hanson, after ninety minutes, to close the blinds before shooting her in the back and fatally wounding her (she later died in hospital, aged 26). Hanson was pregnant with her first child at the time of her murder.

== Aftermath ==
The headmaster, Brother Bede, said: "Nanette is a heroine, a martyr who died for these children. It was due to her courage that a worse tragedy didn't follow." Hanson was subsequently awarded the Albert Medal for Lifesaving. Her citation reads:

"Mrs Hanson was taking a needlework class of twelve girls at St John's School when a soldier, armed with a shot gun, entered the classroom, ordered her and the girls to barricade the doors, and then herded them into a small fitting room which adjoined. During the period that followed the man fired several blasts from the shot gun at the classroom door, on the other side of which the headmaster and members of the staff had gathered. Mrs Hanson was then brought out of the fitting room and showing complete calm, engaged the man in conversation, during which he expressed a wish to see a young nurse and agreed that if she could be brought the children would be set free. Mrs Hanson persuaded those outside to leave her to handle the situation; this despite the fact that the soldier had already once attempted to shoot her at point blank range and would have done so had the gun not misfired. The nurse had meanwhile been brought to the school, and quite voluntarily entered the room in an attempt to pacify the man and secure the release of the girls. This was eventually accomplished through the joint efforts of Mrs. Hanson and the nurse who were then left alone in the room with the man trying to persuade him to give himself up. Before he did so, however, he shot Mrs. Hanson in the back killing her immediately."

Hanson was awarded the Sir James Duncan Medal in 1968 for outstanding bravery in assisting the police in Scotland.

Mone was never convicted of murdering Hanson or the alleged sex offences he committed as he was deemed insane and unfit to plead. Forty years after the crimes, his victims spoke out about the offences in a bid to keep him in hospital. One of the girls, Diane Martin, recalled that Hanson was trying to calm Mone down and get him to release the girls. "She never stopped trying to protect us," Martin said.

In 2000, Hanson was one of 13 recipients of the Victoria Cross, George Cross or Albert Medal honoured in her home town of Bradford when a gallery was set up in their honour in Bradford City Hall.
