= Patchway Community School =

Location
- Hempton Lane; Almondsbury, Gloucestershire, BS32 4AJ; England
- Coordinates: 51.5389°N 2.5689°W

Information
- Type: Academy
- Motto: Learning first, challenge for all
- Department for Education URN: 145124 Tables
- Ofsted: Reports
- Headteacher: Steve Kneller
- Gender: Mixed
- Age: 11 to 18
- Enrolment: 684
- Capacity: 1,429
- Colours: Black and Grey
- Website: http://www.patchwaycs.org.uk/index.asp

Patchway Community School is a mixed secondary school and sixth form located in Almondsbury in the English county of Gloucestershire.

Previously a community school administered by South Gloucestershire Council, Patchway Community School converted to academy status on 1 November 2013. However the school continues to coordinate with South Gloucestershire Council for admissions.

Patchway Community School offers GCSEs and BTECs as programmes of study for pupils, while students in the sixth form have the option to study from a range of A-levels and further BTECs.
