= Patrikeyevo, Kovrovsky District, Vladimir Oblast =

Patrikeyevo Патрикеево
- Village
- Location within Vladimir Oblast Location within Russia
- Coordinates: 56°11′N 41°07′E
- Country: Russia
- Region: Vladimir Oblast
- District: Kovrovsky District
- Time zone: UTC+3:00

Patrikeyevo (Russian: Патрикеево) is a rural locality (a village) in Novoselskoye Rural Settlement, Kovrovsky District, Vladimir Oblast, Russia. The population was 13 as of 2010.

== Geography ==
Patrikeyevo is located 32 km southwest of Kovrov (the district's administrative centre) by road. Dmitriyevo is the nearest rural locality.
