= Alexander Labutkin =

Soviet serial killer

- Born: Alexander Alekseevich Labutkin; 1910; St. Petersburg, Russian Empire
- Died: 1935 (aged 24–25); USSR
- Cause of death: Execution by shooting
- Other names: "The One-Armed Bandit" "The Shooter"
- Conviction: Murder
- Penalty: Death

Details
- Victims: 15
- Span of crimes: 1933–1935
- Country: Soviet Union
- State: Leningrad
- Weapon: Nagant M1895
- Date apprehended: March–April 1935

Alexander Alekseevich Labutkin (Russian: Алекса́ндр Алексе́евич Лабу́ткин; 1910 – 1935), known as The One-Armed Bandit (Russian: Однорукий бандит), was a Soviet serial killer and mass murderer, who committed 15 murders in the area of the Prigorodny settlement of the Leningrad Oblast between 1933 and 1935.

== Biography ==
Labutkin was born in 1910 in St. Petersburg to a working-class family. At the end of the 1920s, he got a job as a gunsmith at the Krasnoznamyonets arms factory. In 1930, while engaged in uprooting stumps with pyroxylin, Labutkin accidentally produced a premature detonation, as a result of which he lost his right hand. In this regard, he could no longer work as a gunner, and therefore he got a job as a steam conductor at the Okhta Combine in Leningrad. Labutkin was extremely passionate about fashionable things. According to the memoirs of his acquaintances, he was very fond of wearing a dark jacket and a wide-brimmed hat, which created an opinion that he was an important personality.

On 30 August 1933, Labutkin, disguised as a mushroom picker, took a Nagant M1895 revolver and went to the forest located behind the Powder plants in the area of Prigorodny village. There he met a company of two men and three women, after which he fired several shots at them. Four died on the spot, and one woman died after some time in the hospital, without having time to give the investigators any evidence. The bullets that the killer had used in committing the crime were made by his acquaintance from the elements of a ball bearing. From the crime scene, Labutkin took away items of insignificant value, which suggests that self-interest was not a driving force in his crimes.

On 2 December 1933, in the same forest, Labutkin shot two more people. He took a couple of valenki, food and several other items from the corpses. On 11 April 1934, he ambushed and shot down an elderly locksmith. He stole money and the suitcase with instruments from the murdered man, also pulling off the gold crowns from his teeth. His crimes were characterized by long pauses between the attacks. Six months later, on 13 November 1934, he shot a birdwatcher who was inspecting songbirds. Labutkin then stole a cage with captured birds in it. On 11 January 1935, Labutkin shot two married couples walking in the woods in the span of two hours. Again, he did not steal items of any special value from the crime scene. A month later, on 17 February 1935, Labutkin killed a lonely worker. He used his wife, Maria, to distract his last victims. On 18 March 1935, Labutkin made another attack on a couple. The man was killed, but the woman survived with slight injuries. She identified the murderer, and Labutkin was soon detained.

=== Trial and execution ===
The investigation into the Labutkin case was short-lived, as Labutkin himself confessed to committing 12 murders. In addition to Maria Labutkina, several others were also arrested on suspicion of concealing the killer's crimes. In the summer of 1935, a trial was held, during which the Special Council of the NKVD sentenced Labutkin to death, while the remaining defendants got long-term prison sentences. Soon after, Labutkin was executed by firing squad.

== See also ==
- List of Russian serial killers
- List of serial killers by number of victims

== Literature ==
- A. I. Rakitin: Socialism does not breed crime - Yekaterinburg: Cabinet Scientist, 2016 - 530 p.
