= 1977 Leningrad shooting =

Mass shooting in the Soviet Union

- Location: 59.9347°N 30.3351°E; Leningrad, Russian SFSR, Soviet Union
- Date: 19 May 1977
- Target: Cadets of the Leningrad Higher Political School of the Ministry of Internal Affairs of the USSR
- Attack type: School shooting, mass shooting
- Weapon: AK-style automatic rifle
- Deaths: 6
- Injuries: 3 (including the perpetrator)
- Perpetrator: Anatoly Fedorenko
- Defender: Sergey Mostakov
- Motive: Personal grievances against fellow cadets
- Sentence: Death

The 1977 Leningrad shooting was a school shooting that occurred on 19 May 1977 at the Higher Political School of the Ministry of Internal Affairs of the USSR in Leningrad, Russian SFSR, Soviet Union. Second-year cadet Anatoly Fedorenko opened fire on other cadets, killing six people and wounding two others. Fedorenko was also wounded by one of the cadets during the shooting.

Fedorenko was subsequently sentenced to death and executed in February 1979.

== Background ==
The Higher Political School of the Ministry of Internal Affairs of the USSR was established in Leningrad in 1968 on the basis of the Leningrad Military-Political School. The school began admitting cadets in September 1969 and trained officers for the internal troops and internal affairs bodies of the Soviet Union.

Anatoly Fedorenko was a second-year cadet at the school. On the night of 19 May 1977, he was serving as a member of a guard detail at the school.

According to later accounts, Fedorenko had developed grievances against several fellow cadets. Rakitin states that his immediate objective was to obtain weapons from the guardroom and then enter his company and kill cadets whom he particularly resented.

== Shooting ==
On the night of 19 May 1977, Fedorenko was serving in the guard detail at the school. According to a later account by former cadets, he asked permission to take his automatic rifle from the weapons room, claiming that he wanted to clean it after it had become wet in the rain. After obtaining the rifle, he loaded it and opened fire on the guard personnel.

Fedorenko first shot the guard commander and another cadet, and then fired at Sergey Mostakov, who was wounded and lost consciousness. Fedorenko continued through the guardroom, killing several members of the guard detail and seriously wounding cadets Vladimir Zhukov and Pavel Semenkov.

Mostakov regained consciousness and took an automatic rifle from the weapons rack. Although seriously wounded, he prepared to defend himself and the other survivors. Fedorenko subsequently shot Mostakov again, but Mostakov remained alive. When Fedorenko approached the wounded guard commander, Mostakov fired at him, seriously wounding him and bringing the attack to an end.

Six people ultimately died from their wounds, including Mostakov, who died on 23 May 1977. Fedorenko survived his wounds and was taken into custody.

== Victims ==
Six people died as a result of the shooting. They included members of the guard detail and cadets present in the guardroom. Sergey Mostakov, who was seriously wounded while attempting to stop Fedorenko, died from his injuries several days later.

Two other cadets, Vladimir Zhukov and Pavel Semenkov, were seriously wounded but survived. Fedorenko was also wounded when Mostakov returned fire.

== Arrest, trial and execution ==
Fedorenko survived the shooting after being seriously wounded and was taken into custody. An investigation into the shooting followed, and the head of the school, Major General Ivan Orlov, was removed from his position after the incident.

Fedorenko was sentenced to death. He was executed by shooting in February 1979, approximately nine months after the shooting.

== Aftermath ==
The shooting received little public attention at the time. According to later accounts by former cadets, the incident was not widely discussed publicly for many years. One account states that its author first encountered a public mention of the shooting almost 40 years after it occurred.

According to later accounts by former cadets, the shooting was initially attributed to unidentified “bandits”. The former cadets stated that Fedorenko was the actual attacker.

== See also ==
- Lyamino school shooting
- List of mass shootings in Russia
- List of school attacks in Russia
- List of school shootings in Europe
