= 2023 Lukavac school shooting =

School shooting in Bosnia and Herzegovina

- Location: Lukavac, Bosnia and Herzegovina
- Date: 14 June 2023
- Target: School staff
- Attack type: School shooting
- Weapon: Handgun
- Deaths: 0
- Injuries: 1
- Perpetrator: Gabrijel Mijatović
- Motive: Under investigation

The 2023 Lukavac school shooting was a school shooting that occurred on 14 June 2023 in Lukavac, Bosnia and Herzegovina. A 13-year-old former student entered a primary school and shot a teacher, who was seriously injured but survived.

The suspect had reportedly been expelled from the school prior to the attack and was arrested shortly after the shooting.

== Background ==
The perpetrator was a 13-year-old former student of the primary school in Lukavac, Bosnia and Herzegovina. He had previously been transferred to another school during the school year due to behavioral issues.

Local officials stated that the attacker was no longer a student at the school at the time of the shooting, having been removed earlier in the academic year.

The incident occurred during a period of heightened concern about school violence in the region following the Belgrade school shooting earlier in 2023.

== Shooting ==
The shooting took place on the morning of 14 June 2023 at the Osnovna škola "Lukavac Grad". According to authorities, the attacker entered the school armed with a handgun and sought out a member of staff.

He fired multiple shots, seriously injuring a teacher (identified in local media as Nedim Osmanović), who sustained a gunshot wound to the neck and was transported to the University Clinical Center in Tuzla, where he underwent emergency surgery and was initially in critical condition.

No students were physically injured in the attack. Police arrested the suspect shortly after the shooting and recovered the weapon.

Following the incident, classes across Tuzla Canton were suspended, and authorities launched an investigation into the circumstances of the attack.

== Trial ==
As the perpetrator was under the age of criminal responsibility under the laws of Bosnia and Herzegovina, he could not be prosecuted in the same manner as an adult. Proceedings focused on determining responsibility within the family and broader circumstances of the attack.

The attacker’s father was arrested on suspicion of illegal possession of weapons and neglect in securing the firearm.

In 2024, a court in Bosnia and Herzegovina sentenced the father to eight months in prison for offenses including illegal possession of weapons and child neglect. The case also raised questions about possible institutional failures, with reports indicating that police and authorities may have had prior information that was not adequately acted upon.

== See also ==
- 2014 Vilijandi school shooting - similar incident
- Belgrade school shooting - happened 1 month before this incident
- 2024 Istanbul school shooting - similar incident
