= Dundee school shooting =

1967 incident in Dundee, Scotland

Coordinates: 56°28′31″N 2°59′46″W

- Location: St John's Roman Catholic High School, Dundee, Scotland
- Date: 1 November 1967
- Attack type: School shooting
- Deaths: 1
- Injuries: 2
- Victims: Nanette Hanson, Marion Young
- Perpetrator: Robert Mone

The Dundee school shooting was a 1967 incident at St John's Roman Catholic High School in Dundee, Scotland.

== Shooting ==
On 1 November 1967, British soldier Robert Mone, absent without leave from his army unit and after drinking for days, entered a girls' needlework class at St John's High School wearing his uniform and armed with a shotgun. He held the 14- and 15-year-old pupils and their pregnant teacher, Nanette Hanson, captive for 90 minutes. Mone's motive is assumed to be revenge for his expulsion from the school.

After entering the classroom, Mone told the girls to barricade the doors and herded them into a fitting room. He fired several rounds at the classroom door. Police brought Mone's grandmother who unsuccessfully asked him to stop. Mone then requested that an acquaintance, 18-year-old nurse Marion Young, be brought to the school. During the standoff, Mone raped one girl, sexually assaulted another, and shot at both women, but the gun misfired. Hanson and Young persuaded Mone to release the girls. Young pleaded with Mone to allow Hanson to be taken to hospital, and Mone told her dismissively that she could do what she wanted. Mone was arrested and Hanson taken to the Dundee Royal Infirmary, where she died from her injuries. On 23 January 1968 Mone was found to be insane and sent to the State Hospital in Carstairs.

In 2017 a retired police officer claimed that a police sniper had Mone in his sights but was denied permission to shoot.

== Victims and honours ==
Nanette Hanson engaged Mone in conversation and he asked for Marion Young to be brought to the school. Eventually, the two women persuaded him to let the girls go. Hanson and Young attempted to get him to surrender but about 90 minutes into the attack he told Hanson to close the blinds and then shot her in the back, fatally wounding her. Young survived.

=== Nanette Hanson ===
Nanette Hanson AM (1941 – 1 November 1967) was a teacher at St John's RC High School. Hanson was born in 1941, in Bradford, Yorkshire, the daughter of George (a police superintendent) and Mary Hall. In May 1967 she married Guy Hanson in Bradford, and the couple moved to Dundee, where Nanette got a job teaching at St John's School. Hanson was pregnant with her first child at the time of her murder. She is buried in St John's Churchyard, Ben Rhydding, Ilkley, Yorkshire. The headmaster, Brother Bede, said: "Nanette is a heroine, a martyr who died for these children. It was due to her courage that a worse tragedy didn't follow."

She attempted to calm Mone during the siege before being fatally wounded by him. She is credited with saving the lives of the twelve girls in her class.

Hanson was posthumously awarded the Albert Medal, which later became the George Cross. In 1971 the Albert Medal was replaced by the George Cross, although Hanson's post-nominal letters remain AM as the change was only made to GC for living recipients choosing that option. Her citation reads:

Mrs Hanson was taking a needlework class of twelve girls at St. John's School when a soldier, armed with a shot gun, entered the classroom, ordered her and the girls to barricade the doors, and then herded them into a small fitting room which adjoined. During the period that followed the man fired several blasts from the shot gun at the classroom door, on the other side of which the headmaster and members of the staff had gathered. Mrs Hanson was then brought out of the fitting room and showing complete calm, engaged the man in conversation, during which he expressed a wish to see a young nurse and agreed that if she could be brought the children would be set free. Mrs Hanson persuaded those outside to leave her to handle the situation; this despite the fact that the soldier had already once attempted to shoot her at point blank range and would have done so had the gun not misfired. The nurse had meanwhile been brought to the school, and quite voluntarily entered the room in an attempt to pacify the man and secure the release of the girls. This was eventually accomplished through the joint efforts of Mrs. Hanson and the nurse who were then left alone in the room with the man trying to persuade him to give himself up. Before he did so, however, he shot Mrs Hanson in the back killing her immediately.

In 2000, Hanson was one of 13 recipients of the Victoria or George Cross honoured in her home town of Bradford when a gallery was set up in their honour in City Hall.

=== Marion Young ===
Marion Young GM (born 1949) was a student nurse in 1967. Young, 18 at the time, also attempted to talk down Mone and save the life of Nanette Hanson.

She was an acquaintance of Robert Mone's, who demanded that she be brought to the school. Young agreed to negotiate with Mone. His first words to her were: “You thought you were being a brave little girl? How did you know I wouldn’t blow your head off?” At one point, when Mone momentarily put the shotgun down, Young picked it up. Mone attacked her and took it back. After Mone shot Hanson, Young attempted to save her life.

For her actions at the school, Marion Young was awarded the George Medal at Buckingham Palace.

== Perpetrator ==
Robert Francis Mone (born 1948) was born in Dundee and grew up with his parents and two sisters. He was bullied by his father and claims to have been raped by a family friend when he was 12. He became depressed when his grandfather died and lived with his grandmother for a while. In 1964, he was expelled from St John's High School. He then joined the Gordon Highlanders and served in the British Army of the Rhine in Germany. He had previously attended St John's RC High School where the murders occurred. Mone's father, Robert Christopher "Sonny" Mone, murdered his aunt and two other women in Dundee after his son's conviction. In 1983, 3 1/2 years into his life sentence, Robert C. Mone was stabbed to death in Craiginches Prison by a fellow inmate.

Following the school shooting, on 23 January 1968 Mone was found to be insane and sent to the State Hospital in Carstairs.

In 1976 he and another man escaped from the State Hospital, Carstairs, killing three people in the process. On 30 November 1976, Mone broke out of Carstairs with his lover and fellow patient Thomas McCulloch, who had shot and wounded two employees at a restaurant in a dispute about getting too little butter for his roll. The two had planned the escape for six months and had assembled a rope ladder, weapons, fake ID and cash. They killed another patient, Ian Simpson, and a nursing officer, Neil McLellan, then climbed a barbed wire fence. They then killed a police officer, Constable George Taylor and stole his panda car. Hospital authorities took 40 minutes to raise the alarm.

Mone and McCulloch were apprehended near Carlisle in northern England, having changed to an Austin, after a high-speed chase down the A74. Four Scottish police vehicles were joined by reinforcements from Cumbria Constabulary, and they forced the fugitives onto a slip road of the M6 motorway where they crashed. Despite the police presence, they tried to seize a car that had stopped at the crash, before being restrained by police, three of whom were awarded the Queen's Gallantry Medal. In early 1977 Mone pleaded guilty to the murder of Taylor, and McCulloch to all three murders. They were imprisoned for life, with a recommendation from Lord Dunpark that they never be released, on 31 March. In May 1981, Mone mounted a rooftop protest over his conditions in HMP Perth.

Mone had six months added to his sentence in 1995 for assaulting a fellow prisoner. In 2002 his sentence was reduced to 25 years under the provisions of the European Convention on Human Rights (ECHR). In 2007, when he was allowed out on day release survivors of the 1967 incident, and politicians Jim McGovern and David McLetchie, argued that Mone should never be released, with McLetchie saying that the ECHR had "crippled the justice system". He was sent back to high security in Glenochil Prison in 2008 following fears that he was planning another escape. McCulloch was released in 2013, but as of October 2023, Mone remained in Glenochil. While imprisoned, he has studied law and philosophy, and transcribed books into Braille. He is Scotland's longest-serving prisoner.

== See also ==
- List of attacks related to secondary schools
- List of serial killers in the United Kingdom
- List of serial killers by number of victims
