= Lyamino =

Lyamino may refer to:

== Places ==
Lyamino (Russian: Лямино) is the name of several inhabited localities in Russia.

Urban localities

- Lyamino, Perm Krai, a work settlement under the administrative jurisdiction of the town of krai significance of Chusovoy in Perm Krai

Rural localities

- Lyamino, Kostroma Oblast, a village in Vlasovskoye Settlement of Oktyabrsky District in Kostroma Oblast; 58°45′N 46°47′E
- Lyamino, Nizhny Novgorod Oblast, a village in Nikolo-Pogostinsky Selsoviet of Gorodetsky District in Nizhny Novgorod Oblast; 56°37′N 43°42′E
- Lyamino, Yaroslavl Oblast, a village in Vereteysky Rural Okrug of Nekouzsky District in Yaroslavl Oblast

== Geology ==
- Lyamino Formation is an Upper Cretaceous fossiliferous formation in Moscow Region, Russia
