= Somercotes Academy =

Location
- Keeling Street; North Somercotes, Lincolnshire, LN11 7PN; England; 53.44681°N 0.13574°E

Information
- Type: Academy
- Established: July 1, 1964
- Local authority: Lincolnshire
- Department for Education URN: 142392 Tables
- Ofsted: Reports
- Headteacher: Jake Bailey
- Gender: Mixed
- Age: 11 to 16
- Capacity: 356
- Website: http://www.somercotesacademy.co.uk/

Somercotes Academy (formerly Birkbeck School) is a mixed secondary school located in North Somercotes, near Louth in Lincolnshire, England. It draws its pupils from largely deprived rural and coastal areas within a 20-mile radius, many travelling by bus for over an hour each way to and from school.

== History ==
It opened in 1964 as North Somercotes Secondary Modern School. The first headmaster was appointed in October 1963, Douglas Mercer Aegerter, who was the deputy headmaster of Weaverham County Secondary School in Cheshire, from January 1964. His son Nicholas was taking Physics, Chemistry and Biology A-levels at Sir John Deane's Grammar School in Northwich, and he had a teenage daughter Josephine, who attended the grammar school in Louth, taking A-levels in 1968. He moved to Saltfleetby.

The new school would take 240 students, also from nearby Fulstow and Grainthorpe. It opened on 1 July 1964, and had taken 22 months to build. The construction was supposed to take 20 months but was delayed by bad weather. It was built by Pulford Ltd of North Somercotes, and cost £133,000. The County Architect was Ronald Clark.

It was renamed after the Director of Education of Lindsey from 1936 to 1964, Frederick John Birkbeck (4 July 1901 - 24 October 1981), in October 1964. It was officially opened by Mr F. J. Birkbeck on Tuesday 20 October 1964, and it was unmodestly named after himself, John Birkbeck. He retired at the end of 1964, after 28 years as Director of Education for Lindsey from 1936. He had taken over from Maudson Grant, and had been deputy director of education for Derbyshire from 1933. He had taught history at Kingston Grammar School in 1924. The Bishop of Lincoln attended. A retirement ceremony for John Birkbeck at Lincoln Technical College on Saturday 14 November 1964.

It opened an evening institute for adult education, with classes in metalwork, accounts, woodwork, dressmaking, conversational French and upholstery. CSE exams would begin in 1967. John Birkbeck presented the prizes in November 1966. John Birkbeck died, aged 80, at Lindsey Cottage in Fovant in Wiltshire in 1981. He had been educated at Winchester, and took History at Brasenose College, Oxford. He had a daughter, Mary.

The BBC Radio 4 Any Questions? was broadcast from the school on Friday 26 June 1981, with Dick Taverne, Robert Key (politician), Dominic Le Foe, and Patricia Hewitt, Labour MP from 1997-2010 for Leicester West.

It faced possible closure in the mid-1980s. Mike Alger was headmaster from 1987, being deputy headmaster from 1982; he joined as head of maths in 1970. 45-year-old classics teacher David Tristram was headmaster from September 1997; he had previously taught at the Weavers in Northamptonshire.

It was previously a foundation school administered by Lincolnshire County Council, Birkbeck School converted to academy status in November 2015 and was renamed Somercotes Academy. The school is now part of the Tollbar Multi Academy Trust (which includes Tollbar Academy and Cleethorpes Academy). However Somercotes Academy continues to coordinate with Lincolnshire County Council for admissions.

== Curriculum ==
The school follows the National Curriculum in Years 7-9, setting students by ability in some subjects. In Years 10 & 11, it offers national diplomas in ICT, Creative & Media, Engineering and Hair & Beauty as an alternative to traditional GCSE courses, as well as a range of foundation courses and the extended project qualification.

In 2012, 42% of all pupils attained five GCSEs grade A* to C including English and mathematics, placing it in the bottom 40% of similar schools' results, and in the bottom 40% of all schools.

== Extracurricular activities ==
The school runs art, ICT, music and science clubs at lunchtime and after school, an after school fitness club, and offers the Duke of Edinburgh's Award Scheme to pupils.

It fields competitive sports teams in Badminton, Cricket, Football and Hockey.
