= Alastair McPherson Johnston, Lord Dunpark =

Scottish law lord

Alastair McPherson Johnston, Lord Dunpark (1915–1991) was a Scottish judge. A controversial and sometimes very lenient judge he made several important rulings in Scots Law such as Porchetta v Porchetta which established that a child's rights were superior to the rights of a father (or mother) and the child's welfare was the paramount issue.

== Life ==
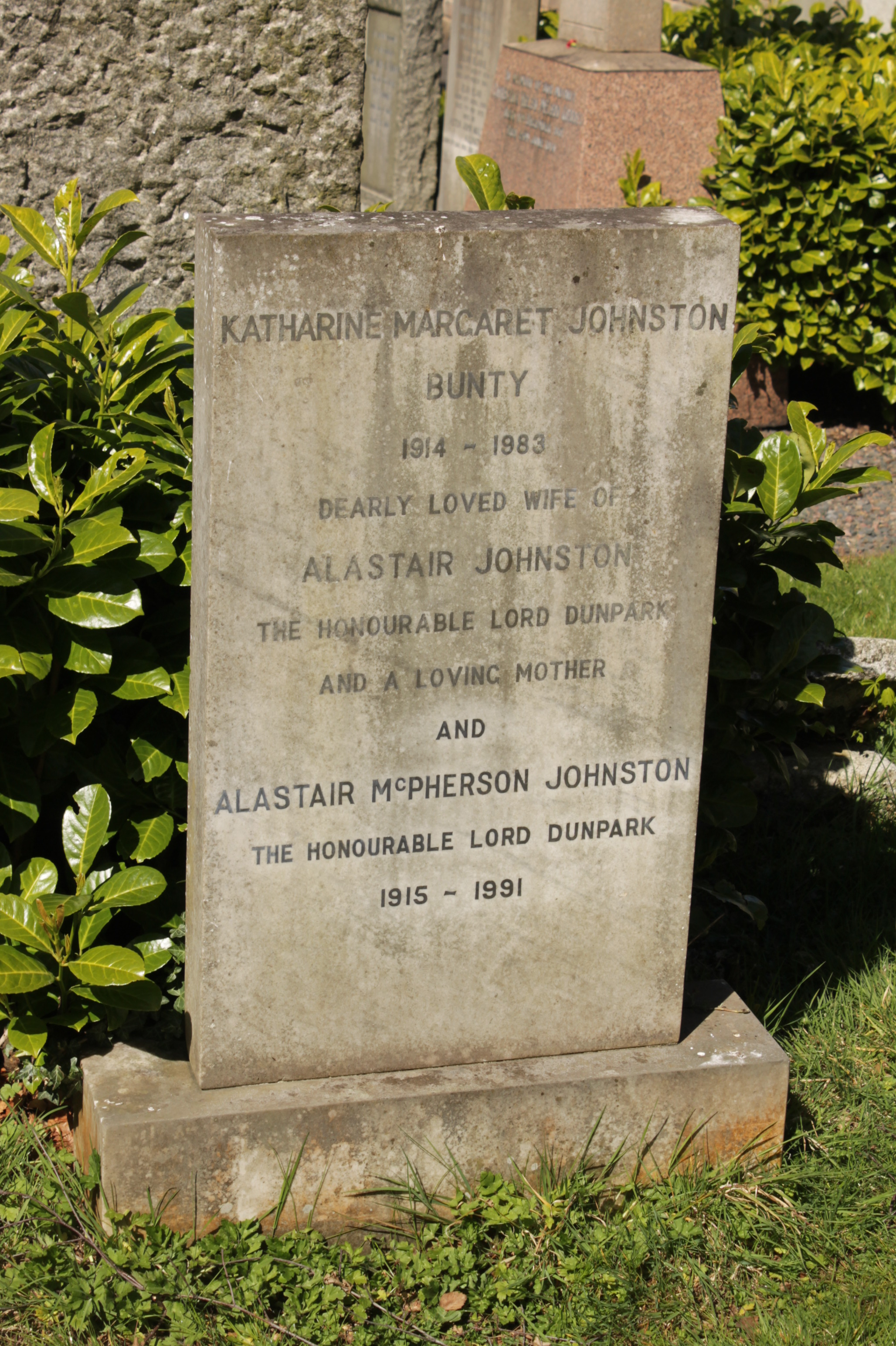
The grave of Lord Dunpark, Dean Cemetery

He was born in Stirling on 15 December 1915 the son of Rev Alexander McPherson Johnston and his wife Eleanora Guthrie Wyllie.

He was created a Senator of the College of Justice in October 1971 with the title of Lord Dunpark. One of his first roles was as a Commissioner on the Scottish Law Commission.

From 1969 to 1973 Lord Dunpark served as chairperson of the influential Edinburgh conservationist organisation the Cockburn Association.

He retired in 1990 aged 75, the maximum age for service as a judge in Scotland.

He died of prostate cancer in Edinburgh on 31 August 1991. He is buried in the modern extension to Dean Cemetery. The grave lies close to the south-east corner.

== Family ==
He married Katherine Margaret Mitchell (1914–1983), known as "Bunty". They were parents to Alan Johnston, Lord Johnston.

Following Bunty's death in 1985 he married Kathleen Elizabeth Sarah Welsh (1919–2003) of County Monaghan in Ireland, widow of John C Macfie of 17 Heriot Row.

== Publications ==
- An Introduction to the Law of Scotland (with JAD Hope)
