= Patrikeyevo, Sudogodsky District, Vladimir Oblast =

Patrikeyevo Патрикеево
- Village
- Location within Vladimir Oblast Location within Russia
- Coordinates: 55°57′N 40°37′E
- Country: Russia
- Region: Vladimir Oblast
- District: Sudogodsky District
- Time zone: UTC+3:00

Patrikeyevo (Russian: Патрикеево) is a rural locality (a village) in Golovinskoye Rural Settlement, Sudogodsky District, Vladimir Oblast, Russia. The population was 3 as of 2010. There are 3 streets.

== Geography ==
Patrikeyevo is located 17 km west of Sudogda (the district's administrative centre) by road. Kliny is the nearest rural locality.
