= 1958 Lyamino school shooting =

Mass shooting in the Soviet Union

Lyamino school shooting
- Location: 58.28083°N 57.71639°E; Lyamino, Perm Oblast, Russian SFSR, Soviet Union
- Date: 11 February 1958; 7:00 pm – 7:30 pm (UTC+4)
- Attack type: Mass shooting, school shooting
- Weapon: Small-caliber rifle
- Deaths: 7
- Injuries: 6
- Perpetrator: Mikhail Tselousov
- Defender: Ponosov (local district militsioner)
- Motive: Dispute with school officials and students
- Sentence: Death

The Lyamino school shooting was a mass shooting that occurred on 11 February 1958 at School of Construction No. 6 in Lyamino, Perm Oblast, Russian SFSR, Soviet Union. Mikhail Tselousov, a 24-year-old secretary of the school's Komsomol organization, opened fire with a small-caliber rifle, killing seven people and wounding six others. The victims included workers and students of the school. Tselousov was sentenced to death and executed in February 1959.

== Background ==
Mikhail Tselousov was a 24-year-old member of the Komsomol who worked as the secretary of the organization's branch at School of Construction No. 6 in Lyamino. According to later accounts, he had received complaints concerning his work and had been reprimanded by his superiors. These accounts also describe personal difficulties in his life before the shooting. Rakitin described the motive for the shooting as non-obvious. Later accounts connected the shooting with complaints about Tselousov's work and personal grievances.

== Shooting ==
On the evening of 11 February 1958, Tselousov, who was intoxicated, entered School of Construction No. 6. He broke into the offices of the school's director and secretary before going to the library, where he took a small-caliber rifle belonging to the local DOSAAF organization. He then left the school carrying the rifle.

After leaving the school, Tselousov fired several shots into the air. Two workers from the construction and installation organization GubakhTyazhStroy, who were returning from work, approached him. Tselousov shot both men, killing them.

Tselousov then went to the school's women's dormitory and opened fire after entering the building. He moved between the rooms, shooting at students inside. He remained in the dormitory for about ten minutes, during which several students escaped and raised the alarm.

A local district militsioner, Ponosov, arrived at the dormitory with a member of the local militsiya assistance brigade. Tselousov was leaving the building when Ponosov confronted and disarmed him, then proceeded to arrest him, ending the attack.

== Victims ==
Seven people were killed in the shooting. Two were workers from the construction and installation organization GubakhTyazhStroy, while the other five were students of School of Construction No. 6. Six additional students were wounded.

Two of the wounded students, Druzhkova and Chupina, later died in hospital, bringing the death toll to seven.

== Arrest, trial and execution ==
Following his arrest, Tselousov admitted responsibility for the killings and cooperated with the investigation. He was ultimately sentenced to death. An appeal to the Supreme Court of the RSFSR did not overturn the sentence, and a request for clemency submitted to the Presidium of the Supreme Soviet of the USSR was rejected. Tselousov was executed in February 1959.

== Aftermath ==
The shooting received little public attention at the time. A report by the Ministry of Internal Affairs of the USSR to the Central Committee of the Communist Party of the Soviet Union documented the killings, but the incident was not widely reported publicly. Later accounts have described the shooting as having been concealed from the wider public.

According to a later account, researchers investigating the shooting were unable to obtain the original case files from the Ministry of Internal Affairs, the Supreme Court and the State Archive of Perm Krai. The account states that the reconstruction of the shooting therefore relied on the MVD report published in 2013 and Alexey Rakitin's 2016 book, which drew on interrogation records and accounts from survivors.

== See also ==
- 1977 Leningrad shooting
- List of mass shootings in Russia
- List of school attacks in Russia
- List of school shootings in Europe
