= Standon Farm School shooting =

1947 School Shooting Incident in Eccleshall, Staffordshire, England

Coordinates: 52.920460°N 2.277370°W

Standon Farm Approved School shooting
- Location: Standon Farm Approved School, Eccleshall, England
- Date: 15 February 1947
- Target: To murder their headmaster, Thomas Dawson, and to escape from the school
- Attack type: School Shooting
- Deaths: 1
- Injuries: 0
- Victim: Peter Fieldhouse
- Perpetrators: Gerald Cawley, Frank Edward Gittings, Henry Jacobs, William Henry Smith

The Standon Farm school shooting was a school shooting in the United Kingdom in which nine boys planned the murder of their headteacher, Thomas Dawson. They stole rifles from the cadet armoury to do so. However, they were interrupted by as assistant gardening teacher, Peter Fieldhouse. Gerald Cawley, aged 15 years shot and killed him. Cawley and three other boys were convicted of murder. Five additional boys were convicted of conspiracy to murder.
