= St John's Roman Catholic High School =

St John's RC High School

Location
- Harefield Road; Dundee, DD3 6SY; Scotland; 56°28′31″N 2°59′47″W

Information
- Motto: Ad Caelos "To the Heavens"
- Religious affiliation: Roman Catholic
- Established: 1931; 95 years ago
- Founder: Marist Brothers
- Local authority: Dundee City Council
- Acting Head Teacher: Wendy Sinclair
- Deputy Head Teacher: David Cecil; Claire Lang; Nicola White
- Staff: 90 (on an FTE basis)
- Gender: Co-educational
- Age: 11 to 18
- Enrolment: 1,285
- Houses: Dunkeld; Jedburgh; Melrose; Balmerino; Lindores
- Colour
- Website: stjohnshigh.ea.dundeecity.sch.uk

St John's Roman Catholic High School is a co-educational Roman Catholic state secondary school in Dundee, Scotland. Established in 1931 by the Marist Brothers, a religious congregation under the patronage of the Virgin Mary, it succeeded earlier Catholic post-primary educational provisions in the city.

As of 2026, the school has an enrolment of approximately 1,285 pupils across S1 to S6. Although Catholic in outlook, it accepts pupils from all religious backgrounds. St John's receives the majority of its intake from six associated Catholic primary schools across west and central Dundee, and operates a pastoral house system named after historic Scottish abbeys.

The school delivers National Qualifications under Scotland's Curriculum for Excellence and is inspected by Education Scotland. Since 2012, St John's has also served as the regional Dundee hub for the Scottish Football Association's Performance School programme, combining academic study with elite youth football development.

== History ==
=== Founding and early years ===
The Marist Brothers arrived in Dundee in 1860, initially directing three Roman Catholic primary schools in the city (St Andrew's, Our Lady's Forebank, and St Joseph's), while secondary education for Catholic boys and girls was provided at Lawside Academy.

In 1916, managers of Dundee's Catholic schools invited the Brothers to establish a secondary school for boys, planning alterations to their house in Forebank. Although preparations were finalized by 1918, the implementation of the Education (Scotland) Act 1918 transferred diocesan schools to local education authorities, halting the original secondary plans.

In 1931, a new central school was established to cater to post-primary pupils not attending Lawside Academy. Named St John's (after John the Apostle), the school opened in buildings on Park Place previously occupied by Harris Academy, with the Marist Brothers taking administrative charge.

=== 1967 hostage incident ===
On 1 November 1967, 19-year-old former pupil Robert Mone entered a needlework classroom at St John's armed with a shotgun while absent without leave from the British Army. He held pregnant teacher Nanette Hanson and 26 pupils hostage for 90 minutes, during which he assaulted two pupils.

After Hanson and nurse Marion Young persuaded Mone to release the children, Mone shot and killed Hanson. He was apprehended, found insane at trial in January 1968, and sent to the State Hospital at Carstairs, from which he later escaped in 1976.

== Campus and developments ==
In November 2004, Dundee City Council approved an £11.5 million redevelopment plan for the Harefield Road campus. Reconstruction took place between October 2004 and October 2006, during which time pupils were temporarily decanted to the former Rockwell High School building on Lawton Road.

The project involved demolishing the original three-storey teaching block and replacing it with a four-storey facility housing a 25-metre swimming pool, fitness suite, games hall, drama studio, multi-purpose learning centre, and specialized teaching departments. The adjacent eastern block was renamed the Iona Block and refurbished for science and home economics facilities. The £12.5 million completed project was officially reopened by Cardinal Keith O'Brien on 15 February 2007.

In 2012, St John's was designated as the regional Dundee base for the Scottish Football Association's Performance Schools system, designed to support elite youth football development alongside standard academic curricula.

== House system ==
Pastoral care and inter-house activities at St John's are structured around a house system. Upon entry, pupils are allocated to one of five houses named after historic Scottish religious sites:

- Balmerino – Named after Balmerino Abbey in Fife.
- Dunkeld – Named after Dunkeld Abbey in Perthshire.
- Jedburgh – Named after Jedburgh Abbey in the Scottish Borders.
- Lindores – Named after Lindores Abbey in Fife.
- Melrose – Named after Melrose Abbey in the Scottish Borders.

Principal Teachers of Guidance oversee pupil welfare and academic progress within each house, supported by S6 House Captains who lead assemblies, mentoring programmes, and charitable initiatives.

== Associated primary schools ==
St John's forms part of a Catholic educational cluster in Dundee, receiving the majority of its S1 intake from six primary schools:

- Our Lady's RC Primary School
- SS Peter and Paul RC Primary School
- St Clement's RC Primary School
- St Joseph's RC Primary School
- St Mary's RC Primary School
- St Ninian's RC Primary School

== Academic performance and inspections ==
St John's RC High School is evaluated by Education Scotland, which assesses learning quality, pastoral care, and attainment metrics. Senior Phase pupils (S4–S6) sit National Qualifications administered by the Scottish Qualifications Authority (SQA), including National 5, Higher, and Advanced Higher exams.

== Notable former pupils ==
- Dick McTaggart (1935–2025), Olympic gold medalist boxer
- Ernie Ross (1942–2021), Labour Party politician and MP for Dundee West
- Robert Mone (born 1948), convicted murderer
- David Narey (born 1956), Scotland international footballer
- Jenny Marra (born 1977), Scottish Labour politician
- Michael Marra (born 1979), Scottish Labour politician
- Kieren Webster (born 1986), musician (The View)
- Kyle Falconer (born 1987), musician (The View)
- Scott Allardice (born 1998), professional footballer
- Logan Chalmers (born 2000), professional footballer
- Sam Hickey (born 2000), Commonwealth Games gold medalist boxer
- Lyall Cameron (born 2002), professional footballer
- Kerr Smith (born 2004), professional footballer

== See also ==
- List of schools in Dundee
- Education in Scotland
