= Crime in Serbia =

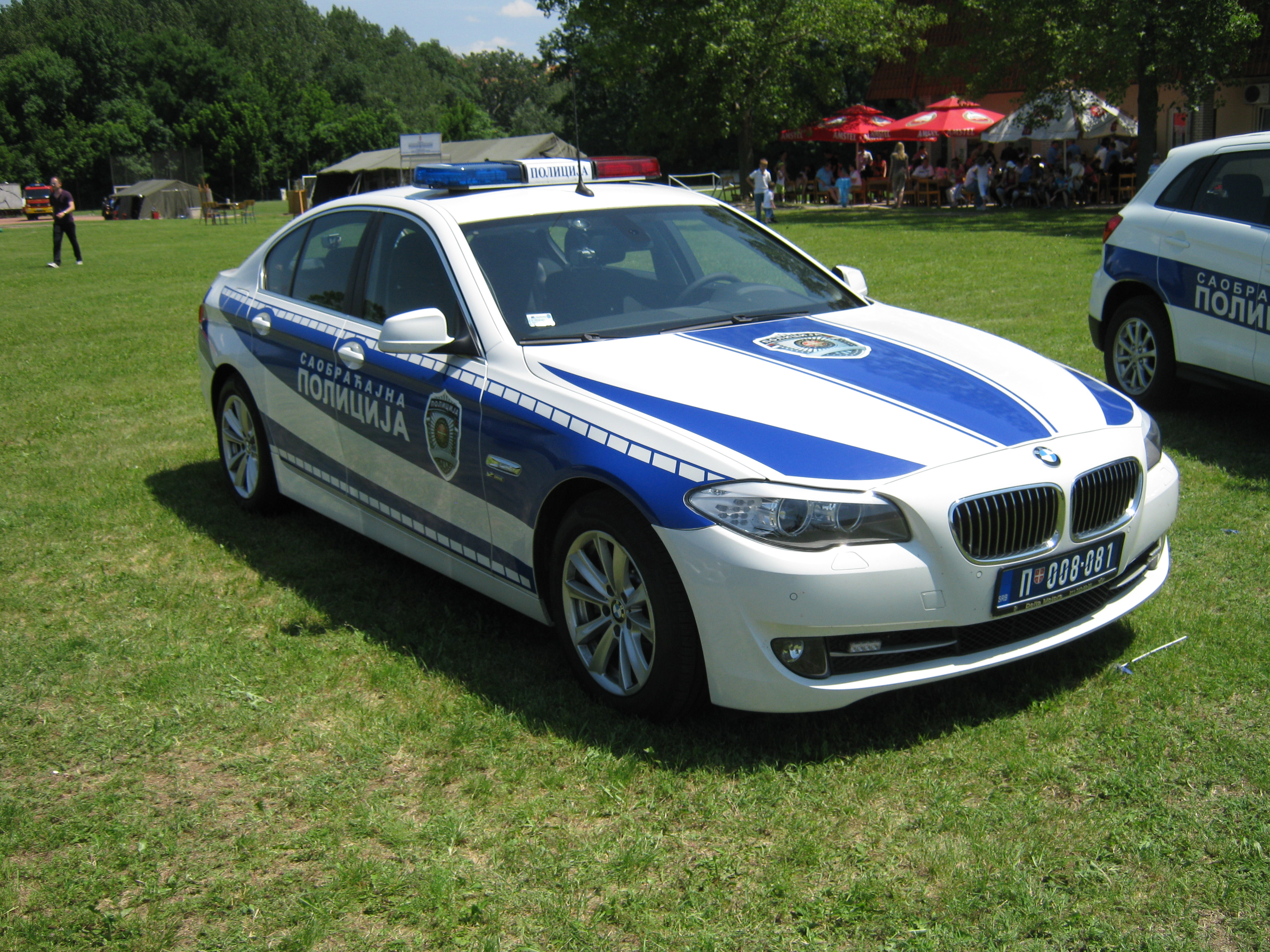
Serbian police patrol car

Crime in Serbia includes murder, organised crime, corruption, piracy, false bomb threats and mass shootings among others. It is combated by the Serbian police and other government agencies.

== Crime by type ==
=== Murder ===
In 2000, Serbia had a murder rate of 2.4. This increased in 2001 when the murder rate rose to 2.6, after which the murder rate started decreasing, reaching below 2.0 in 2003. In 2012, Serbia had a murder rate of 1.2 per 100,000 population, with a total of 111 murders. In 2020, Serbia's murder rate was 1.02.

=== Mass shootings ===
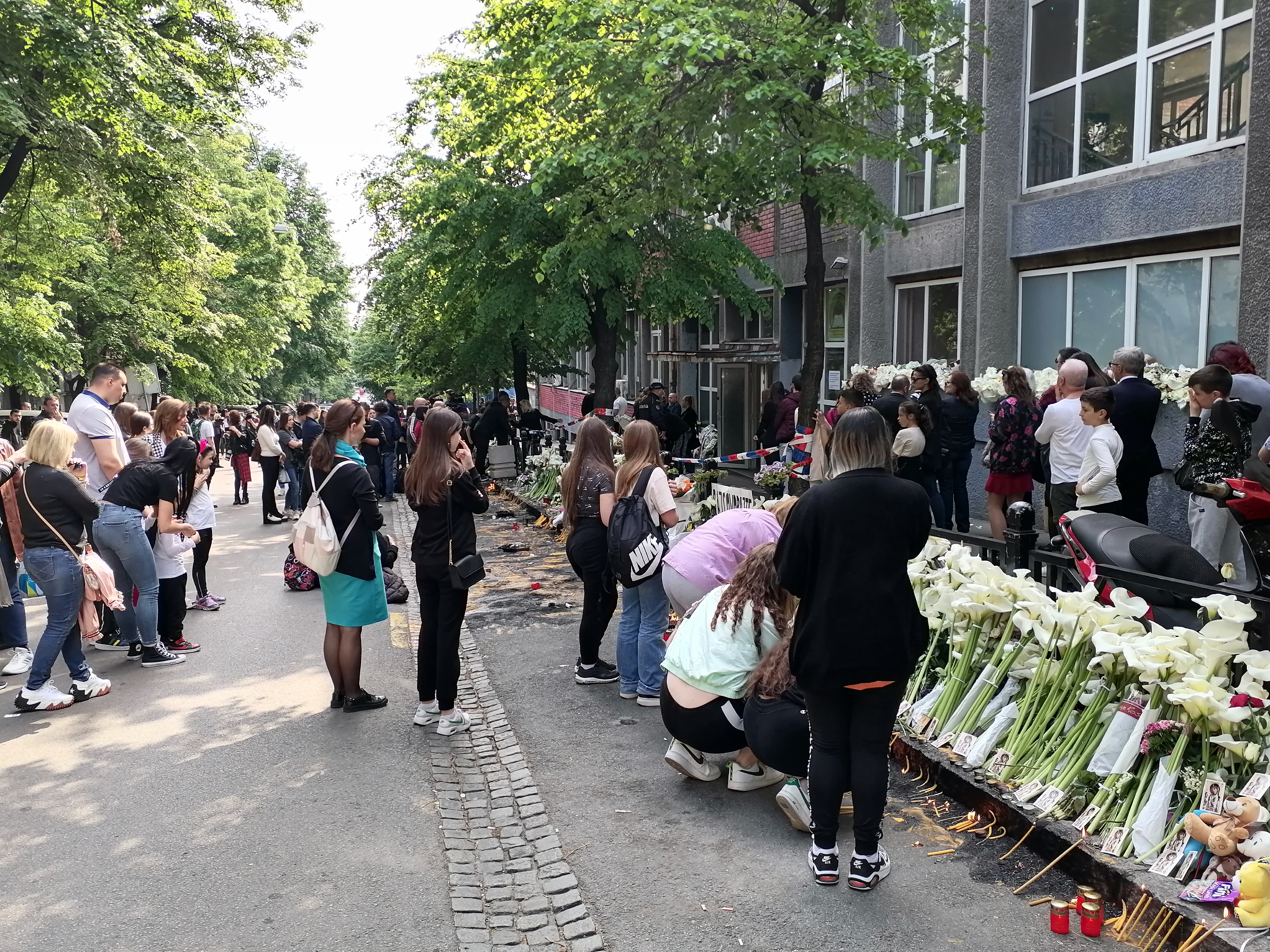
Flowers gathered by Serbians in tribute to those killed in the Belgrade school shooting

A number of mass shootings have occurred in Serbia. The first being the Paraćin massacre in 1987, where Aziz Kelmendi, a Kosovo Albanian conscript in the Yugoslav People's Army entered a military guard post and killed four soldiers and wounded five, before later being found dead from apparent suicide.

Mass shootings in Serbia continued to occur in the 1990s, 2000's, 2010's and 2020's, with each decade seeing at least two mass shootings. The deadliest, the 2013 Velika Ivanča shooting, saw 14 killed including the perpetrator.

In May 2023, two mass shootings took place in Serbia within a week, one of them being the Belgrade school shooting where nine people were killed and seven wounded, the other took place in a rural area south of Belgrade where eight people were killed and 14 wounded.

=== Organised crime ===
Serbian organized crime, sometimes called Serbian mafia (Serbian: Cpпска мафија, romanized: Srpska mafija), comprises various criminal organisations, that are either based in Serbia or composed of ethnic Serbs. Serbian criminals are active in the European Union (EU) countries. The organisations are primarily involved in smuggling, arms trafficking, drug trafficking, protection racket, illegal gambling, jewelry and gems theft, bodyguarding, and contract killing. The Mafia is composed of several major organised groups, which in turn have wider networks throughout primarily Europe.

The Yugoslav Wars prompted criminals a "way out" of economic disaster during the international imposed sanctions against Serbia. Serbian criminals have been recruited to state security forces, a notable example is Legija, a commander in the Arkan's Tigers which after the war was re-labeled as the JSO (Red Berets), he allegedly planned the murder of Prime Minister Zoran Đinđić.

In 2021, Serbia ranked 33rd in the Global Organised Crime Index, behind only Russia in terms of highest organised crime rate. According to the index, ″mafia style″ groups have significant protection by prosecutors, political figures and the media. The country was described as a place of origin, transit and destination for human trafficking, with trade also including illegal arms and drugs.

=== Corruption ===
Corruption levels are perceived to be high by surveyed residents of Serbia, and public trust in key institutions remains low.

Public procurement, public administration recruitment processes, mining and rail operations are sectors with a serious problem of conflict of interest. The European Commission has raised concern over Serbia's judiciary, police, health and education sectors that are particularly vulnerable to corruption. Transparency Serbia estimated in September 2016 that at least 374,000 cases of "petty corruption" in public services remain undiscovered every year. In 2022, Serbia scored 36 on Transparency International's corruption perception index, placing it at rank 101 out of 180 countries in terms of most corrupt countries in the world, meaning Serbia ranked as one of the nations with highest corruption rates in Europe.

=== Piracy ===
Piracy in Serbia increased in intensity during the 2000s and 2010s. Especially threatened is the shipping on the part of Danube between Belgrade and Smederevo. Most commonly, pirates will plunder bulk cargo such as oil, coke, metals, grains, sugar or fertilizers, but sometimes also remove cables and electric motors from the ships.

The confrontations of the pirates with the crews rarely escalate, with a single shipman murder recorded, in the late 2000s. This is, in part, because crews will often cooperate with the pirates, sell part of the cargo, then report the piracy to receive insurance money. Cases of cooperation of the pirates with the police have also been recorded.

The pirates will also often engage in smuggling fuel and other goods across Danube.

=== False bomb threats ===
False bomb threats are relatively common in Serbia. Since the police reacts to every bomb threat by searching the entire buildings for the possible bomb, most common targets are schools where students will phone in a threat to delay their exams, and courts where people expecting to lose a trial will phone in to delay it. Due to false bomb threats, the building of the High Court in Belgrade had to be evacuated more than 70 times in 2008.

Less common targets include those as diverse as Belgrade firefighters' headquarters, a residential building or Kraljevo public library.

Frequency of the false bomb threats was reduced in 2009, after a new law specified harsher, triplified, punishments.

=== Rape and sexual harassment ===
There is a low number of official complaints of sexual harassment in Serbia, though it has been reported that only a small number of women choose to report the crime, with experts saying the way the police and courts handle such cases discourages victims coming forward. The minimum sentence for rape in Serbia is five years in prison, which is higher than in several neighbouring countries, with this minimum sentence frequently being imposed. Many of those convicted of ″illicit sexual activity″ or sexual harassment avoid jail.
