= Mladenovac shootings =

Mladenovac shootings may refer to:

- Velika Ivanča shooting, in 2013
- Mladenovac and Smederevo shootings, in 2023
