= 2023 Belgrade shooting =

2023 Belgrade shooting refers to either of the following two mass shootings, separated by a single day (and otherwise unrelated):

- 3 May 2023 Belgrade shooting at an elementary school, better known as the Belgrade school shooting
- 4 May 2023 Belgrade shooting as part of the Mladenovac and Smederevo shootings – a multi-part event which occurred in Belgrade and elsewhere
