= Sefer =

Sefer may refer to:

- Sefer (Hebrew), a term for a book
- Antonio Sefer, Romanian professional footballer
- Sefer (given name)
- Sefer, Preševo, village in Serbia
- Šefer, South Slavic surname
