= Mladenovac and Smederevo shootings =

2023 spree shooting in Serbia

- Location: Dubona, Mladenovac, and Malo Orašje, Smederevo, Serbia
- Date: 4 May 2023; 3 years ago
- Target: General public
- Attack type: Drive-by shooting; mass shooting; spree shooting; massacre
- Weapons: Zastava M70AB2 assault rifle; Tokarev TT-33 pistol; three hand grenades: M52; M75; M79
- Deaths: 9
- Injuries: 13
- Perpetrator: Uroš Blažić
- Motive: Spreading fear
- Convictions: Blažić: Murder; Attempted murder; Criminal possession of a weapon; Kidnapping; Carjacking; Blažić's family: Blažić's father: Criminal possession of a weapon; Acts against public safety Blažić's first cousin: Criminal possession of a weapon

On the evening of 4 May 2023, a shooting spree occurred in the villages of Dubona and Malo Orašje, between Mladenovac and Smederevo, Serbia. Armed with an automatic assault rifle, the shooter opened fire from a car, resulting in the deaths of nine individuals, including an off-duty police officer, and leaving thirteen others injured. The perpetrator, 20-year-old Uroš Blažić, fled the scene but was apprehended the next day near Kragujevac.

Following the incident, Blažić's father, uncle, and first cousin were also taken into custody, facing charges related to criminal possession of a weapon. The uncle and first cousin were tried separately from the rest. The first cousin was found guilty and sentenced to 18 months in prison, while the uncle was acquitted. Blažić's father was also found guilty and sentenced to 20 years in prison.

Blažić was charged with murder, attempted murder, criminal possession of a weapon, kidnapping, and carjacking. On 12 December 2024 he was found guilty on all charges and was sentenced to 20 years in prison.

This incident occurred one day after the Belgrade school shooting. Both shootings caused mass protests in Serbia.

== Background ==
Despite strict gun laws, (Note: To own a gun in Serbia, citizens must prove a valid reason to own a gun, such as an ongoing threat to life or a legitimate need for hunting or sport shooting. They must submit a medical report to the Ministry of Internal Affairs, which then instructs the submitter's physician to report whenever any relevant changes in their health occur. The police may prohibit an individual's possession of a weapon when they assess that the owner could misuse it. Open carry is also not allowed; concealed carry permits are rarely issued and require proof of a threat to life.) Serbia has one of the world's highest gun ownership rates per capita. In 2021, with an estimated 39 privately owned guns per 100 people, Serbia was the third-ranked country globally in this statistic, behind the United States and Yemen. Along with a culture of gun ownership and many households keeping guns as war trophies from the 20th-century wars in the region, illegal weapons became particularly widespread in some Balkan countries following the Yugoslav Wars in the 1990s.

Mass shootings are rare in Serbia and the rest of the Balkans. There have been four earlier mass shootings in the 21st century: the 2007 Jabukovac killings, during which nine people were killed and five were injured; the 2013 Velika Ivanča shooting, which also occurred in Mladenovac and in which 14 people were killed; the 2016 Žitište shooting, in which five people were killed and 22 injured; and the Belgrade school shooting that occurred the day before, leading the Serbian government to propose stricter regulations on gun ownership.

== Shooting ==
Key locations prior, during, and after the shootings.
1 The shooter got in a quarrel with his friends in Mladenovac
2 He went to Šepšin for a rifle
3 He went to Malo Orašje where he shot 11 people
4 He went to Dubona where he shot 7 people
5 At the Mali Požarevac Tollbooth he seized a taxi
6 He ran off to Vinjište where he was arrested on the next day

The shooter, 20-year-old Uroš Blažić, quarreled with his friends at a football stadium in Mladenovac. After that, he drove to Šepšin, where he took weapons from his cottage. Then, he went by car to Malo Orašje, where at 10:32 p.m. he began his rampage. He shot 11 friends who were having a barbecue in the centre of the village, near the football field and the war victims' monument. Afterwards, he continued to Dubona. There, he first fired a pistol at several older adults who were repairing the fence, seriously injuring them. Then, he continued to the schoolyard, located next to the road, where he killed four young people with a rifle and then wounded several additional people, again with a pistol. All roads around Mladenovac towards Dubona and Šepšin were closed after the shooting. Blažić was allegedly alone while the shooting occurred.

External media

Images
- Uroš Blažić arrested, hms.ba

Video
- Suspect arrested for murders in villages near Mladenovac on YouTube (1:25)

After the shootings, Blažić left his car and stole another in Dubona, driving to the tollbooth near Mali Požarevac. There, he stopped a taxi driver from Smederevo who was driving a pregnant woman. Threatening them with a hand grenade, he demanded to be taken to a village near Kragujevac. Blažić reportedly let the pregnant woman out of the car more than half an hour later. The police issued a warrant for his arrest and searched for him in Mali Požarevac, where he was last seen after the shootings. The taxi then took him to Vinjište, near Kragujevac, where he hid himself and was eventually arrested.

According to Blic, the taxi driver told the Prosecutor's Office that he received a call from the dispatcher with a ride to the vicinity of Ub. While he was driving a female passenger, he turned off the highway at the Mali Požarevac tollbooth due to the presence of police vehicles. At around 11:30 p.m., Blažić entered the taxi driver's car, claiming he had a bomb. Blažić sat next to the woman, who was silent. At the toll booth, Blažić was disturbed by the presence of police officers and ordered the taxi driver to drive without stopping and with the fuse on. The woman lied to Blažić that she was pregnant, in order to try to get sympathy. After that, Blažić calmed down and asked the taxi driver to go to Mladenovac. The taxi driver convinced Blažić to take the woman to Ub to avoid suspicion. While driving, the taxi driver received a call from the dispatcher who asked about the murders, but the taxi driver replied that he did not know much. While driving, the woman's boyfriend called her on a phone, but Blažić warned her to be careful with what she said. The taxi driver heard Blažić say, "You will be fine; you just have to listen to me." The taxi driver tried to persuade Blažić to get out of the vehicle earlier so that the boyfriend would not become suspicious, but Blažić did not comply. When they arrived near Ub, Blažić warned the woman to watch what she was doing and not to report him so she would not have problems. Her boyfriend paid for the ride, and the woman exited the car. Blažić then ordered the taxi driver to turn off the meter and the tablet and to go to Kragujevac using side roads.

== Casualties ==
Casualties by location
Village	Deaths	Injured
Dubona	3	4
Malo Orašje	6	5
Unreported	0	3

Fatalities

Dubona

1. Kristina Panić, 19
2. Milan Panić, 21
3. Dalibor Todorović, 24

Malo Orašje

1. Nikola Milić, 14
2. Aleksandar Milovanović, 17
3. Lazar Milovanović, 19
4. Marko Mitrović, 18
5. Petar Mitrović, 25 (Note: P. Mitrović succumbed to injuries 50 days later in a hospital.)
6. Nemanja Stevanović, 21

— Various reports

Eight people were instantly killed in the shootings. Among the victims in Dubona was an off-duty police officer, aged 21; his 19-year-old sister; and a 25-year-old man. Two 15-year-old boys and three men, aged 18, 20, and 21, lost their lives in Malo Orašje. One of the wounded from Malo Orašje, a 26-year-old man, died more than a month later, on 23 June, bringing the number of deaths to nine.

According to the Ministry of Internal Affairs, fourteen others, including children, were injured. The injured were sent to University Hospital Center Dr Dragiša Mišović. The Minister of Health, Danica Grujičić, said all of the wounded were in a life-threatening situation. One injured girl had her hand amputated. However, some media outlets reported were thirteen injured, while others reported twelve.

== Emergency response ==
The Gendarmery, Special Anti-Terrorist Unit, and Helicopter unit were reported to have arrived at the villages of Mladenovac and Dubona. According to Serbian media, police officers set up checkpoints and stopped cars as they searched for the gunman. Helicopters, drones, and multiple police patrols were also dispatched to the area surrounding Dubona. Grujičić and the head of the Security Intelligence Agency, Aleksandar Vulin, reportedly travelled to the area. A blood donation for the wounded was organised by the Ministry of Health.

== Legal proceedings ==
=== Perpetrator ===
Blažić was brought to a police station in Smederevo on 5 May and was later ordered to be detained for 48 hours. He was charged with murder, criminal possession of a weapon, kidnapping, and carjacking. On 6 May, Blažić admitted to committing the acts and said he used an assault rifle and three pistols. He acknowledged his shootings of people he did not know to spread fear among villages. In his testimony, Blažić tried to justify his massacre by claiming that he suffered bullying in primary school and that the villagers "taunted him and plotted against him" and allegedly spoke severely about his father, including that he was a "criminal".

On 7 May, the High Court issued a judgment to take him in custody for 30 days. On 10 May, the rifle used in the shootings was found in Šepšin. On 25 May, Blažić was transferred to the Special Prison Hospital in Belgrade, where he underwent a mental status examination. On 2 June, his detention was extended for another 30 days. On 26 June, the court prohibited Blažić and his father and uncle from disposing of their property. On 30 June, Blažić's detention was re-extended for another 30 days. On 27 July, Blažić's detention was re-extended for three months.

His trial began on 23 August 2024. On 12 December he was found guilty of all charges and was sentenced to 20 years in prison, maximum sentence he was facing due to him being under 21 years of age at the time of the shooting. On 20 June 2025, verdict was confirmed.

=== Perpetrator's family ===
Blažić's uncle and grandfather were also arrested. The police found four bombs, a flare gun, a submachine gun, two silencers, a hunter's knife, and various ammunition in the house of Blažić's grandfather. Although they did not participate in preparing the incident or its execution, three members of Blažić's family were arrested on charges of criminal possession of weapons, including the father who is also charged for acts against public safety. These are the following persons:

Relation (Note: The interpersonal relationship with the suspect.)	Name	Born	Notes	Date apprehended	Current status	Ref.
Father	Radiša Blažić (Радиша Блажић)	1968/1969	Retired lieutenant colonel, Serbian Armed Forces	10 May 2023	Sentenced to 20 years (Served 3 years and 6 months so far)	
Maternal uncle	Undisclosed (Note: Blažić's uncle is refereed under initials G. G.)	1974	Owns the house in Vinjište, Stanovo, Kragujevac, where Blažić was arrested	24 May 2023	Acquitted	
First cousin	Undisclosed (Note: Blažić's first cousin is refereed under initials B. G.)	2003/2004	Son of Blažić's uncle	11 June 2023	Served his sentence (18 months)	

On 10 May, the police arrested Blažić's father, lieutenant colonel Radiša Blažić. They found several hundred bullets and two handguns in his house. The next day, the High Court issued a judgment to keep the father in custody for 30 days. On 8 June, his detention was extended for another 30 days. On 26 June, the Higher Public Prosecutor's Office in Smederevo ordered a mental status examination for the father. On 5 July, his detention was re-extended for another 30 days. On 27 July, the father's detention was re-extended for three months. In September, the higher public prosecutor's office in Smederevo expanded the investigation against the father due to the suspicion that he committed a criminal act against public safety.

On 26 May, the High Court also issued a judgment to keep the uncle in custody for 30 days because he would interfere with the proceedings by influencing the witnesses. His 30-day detention was re-extended twice; on 22 June and 21 July.

On 11 June, the police arrested Blažić's 19-year-old first cousin while the High Court issued a judgment to keep him in custody for 30 days. On 22 July, his detention was extended for another 30 days.

Blažić's uncle and first cousin were tried separately from Blažić and his father. Their trial started on 27 May 2024. On 19 June, first cousin was found guilty and sentenced to 18 months in prison, while uncle was acquitted. On 8 May 2025, verdict was confirmed.

Radiša Blažić was tried together with his son, and was found guilty on both charges. He was sentenced to 20 years in prison. On 20 June 2025, verdict was confirmed.

Forensic analysis, primarily the mobile device forensics, were slated to reveal whether Blažić had an accomplice.

=== Witnesses ===
According to Blic, at least 50 witnesses were scheduled to be brought in for questioning starting on 25 May. At the same time, the Higher Public Prosecutor's Office gave experts and psychiatrists a deadline to perform an expert examination of Blažić and submit their findings to the prosecutor's office within the next 30 days. On 30 May, the woman in the taxi that Blažić hijacked was heard before the Higher Public Prosecutor's Office in Smederevo, where she said that she faked her pregnancy after Blažić hijacked the vehicle because she was afraid that he would kill her. As of 29 June, 48 witnesses were brought in for questioning or gave their testimony, including family members of the victims, eyewitnesses, and others. Blažić's brother refused to testify.

== Perpetrator ==
Uroš Blažić
- Born: 11 October 2002 (age 24)
- Criminal charges: Murder; criminal possession of a weapon; kidnapping; carjacking
- Penalty: 20 years in prison
- Capture status: Detained

Details
- Date apprehended: 5 May 2023; 3 years ago

Uroš Blažić (Serbian Cyrillic: Урош Блажић; born 11 October 2002) is the perpetrator of the shootings.

According to neighbors, Blažić was known for his arrogant and aggressive behavior, as well as for the fact that he was never held accountable for his misdemeanors, since he was protected by his father. He has been a fan of a Serbian former criminal, Kristijan Golubović.

Blažić opened his criminal record several years ago. On 28 July 2019, a misdemeanour charge of insolent behaviour was filed against him after he used a chainsaw to cut the ramp used by a Dubona local to protect the entrance to his property. The tractor's front wheel, which the minor was driving, caused minor injuries to the person. Blažić also has an assault on a police officer in his file. As a minor, he drove a motorcycle, did not stop at the police officer's signal and hit him with his motorcycle. The police officer sustained shoulder and hip injuries. He passed two patrols, and the third one stopped him. An invitation was sent to report on 1 June 2020 to the juvenile police officer in Mladenovac. Then his motorcycle was temporarily confiscated.

His father is a retired lieutenant colonel of the Serbian Armed Forces. In 2022, Blažić passed all of the tests while enrolling at the Military Academy in Serbia. However, he did not pass the Military Security Agency (VBA) background check due to previous misdemeanour proceedings for violent behaviour.

=== Events during his imprisonment ===
On 17 June 2023, Blažić fought with another detainee after returning to the Smederevo detention from the Special Prison Hospital in Belgrade. After the argument, he physically attacked his cellmate, punching him in the face. On 7 July, the court sentenced him to a disciplinary penalty of visiting restrictions for all family members.

On 1 August, firefighters extinguished a fire at the cottage in Šepšin where Blažić had weapons stored prior to the attack. It is not known how the fire broke out. According to Blic, locals suspect that the fire was set. Also, the locals had been protesting for a long time, demanding that Blažić's family move out of the village.

== Aftermath ==
Interior Minister Bratislav Gašić and President of Serbia Aleksandar Vučić denounced the shooting as a terrorist act. At a press conference on 5 May, Vučić announced new measures and added that Blažić "will not see the light of day again", that "he will not get out of the prison", and that all people with weapons will undergo an audit. The new measures include a moratorium on gun permits, more medical and psychological checks on gun owners, and hiring 1,200 police officers in schools. He also announced that the new measures would "almost completely disarm Serbia". The measures were adopted by the government later that day.

On 23 May, President Vučić visited Dubona and Malo Orašje to meet with the victims' families On 13 June, the fortieth-day memorial service was held in Dubona and Malo Orašje.

On 8 May, the Serbian Ministry of Internal Affairs offered a one-month amnesty for surrendering illegal or unregistered weapons and ammunition. Initially set to end on 8 June, the call, known as Hand Over Your Weapons (Serbian Cyrillic: Предај оружје, romanized: Predaj oružje), had extended the deadline to 30 June. The ministry reported that citizens handed over 78,302 firearms, 4,085,000 rounds of ammunition, and 25,914 pieces of ordnance by the end of the call.

On 18 July, MP Marinika Tepić was elected as the chairperson of the National Assembly's Inquiry Committee to determine the facts and circumstances that led to the mass murders at the Belgrade school shooting and Dubona and Malo Orašj shootings.

=== Protests ===
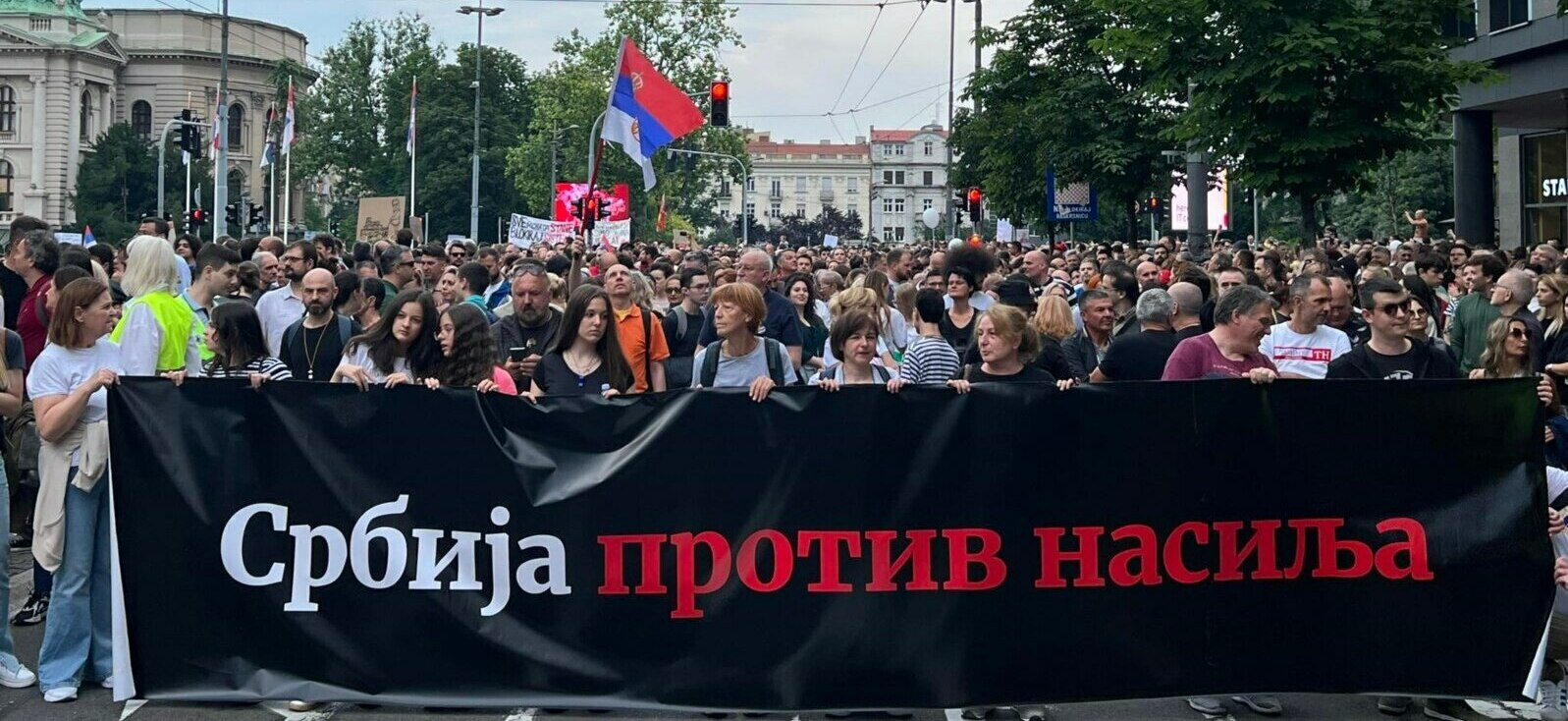
Demonstrators in Belgrade on 17 June carrying a banner with the inscription: "Србија против насиља" (translated to English: "Serbia Against Violence").

Following the shootings, opposition parties, namely the Ujedinjeni parliamentary group, People's Party, Do not Let Belgrade Drown, Together, Democratic Party, and Dveri, announced they would organise a protest against violence on 8 May. The protestors met in front of the country's parliament before marching in silence through the streets near Serbian government offices to demand the resignation of Vulin, Gašić, the Minister of Education Branko Ružić, and the council of the Regulatory Authority for Electronic Media, as well as cancelling programmes that promote violence and shutting down media and tabloids that publish false news and violate the Journalistic Code. In response, Prime Minister Ana Brnabić accused them of "politicising" the shootings. According to the organisers, the protest in Belgrade was attended by approximately 50,000 demonstrators. The second protest was held on 12 May; it began in front of the National Assembly of Serbia building while the demonstrators continued walking to the Gazela Bridge and ended at Sava Centar. Another "Serbia Against Violence" protest was held a day later in Kragujevac.

== See also ==
- List of massacres in Serbia
- List of rampage killers in Europe
- List of national days of mourning (2020–present)
