= Sefer (given name) =

Sefer is a masculine given name of Turkish origin. Notable people with the name include:

== Given name ==
- Sefer Aycan (born 1963), Turkish doctor
- Sefer Baygın (1942–2026), Turkish wrestler
- Sefer Daja (1897–1977), person from Tirana, Albania
- Sefer Emini (born 2000), Macedonian footballer
- Sefer Halilović (born 1952), Bosnian general
- Sefer Pasha (1798–1860), Circassian diplomat and military commander
- Sefer Reis (died 1565), Turkish privateer and Ottoman admiral
- Sefer Seferi (born 1979), Macedonian boxer
- Sefer Ali-Bey Sharvashidze (died 1821), Abkhaz prince
- Sefer Turan (born 1962), Turkish journalist and author
- Hoca Sefer, 15th-century Ottoman captain
