= Mihály Nyilas =

Serbian-Hungarian politician

Mihály Nyilas (Serbian Cyrillic: Михаљ Њилаш, romanized: Mihalj Njilaš; born 14 January 1962) is an ethnic Hungarian politician in Serbia. He was the mayor and Kanjiža from 2008 to 2014 and was a deputy prime minister of Vojvodina from 2014 to 2020. He is now a secretary of state in Serbia's ministry of justice. Nyilas is a member of the Alliance of Vojvodina Hungarians (Vajdasági Magyar Szövetség, VMSZ).

== Early life and career ==
Nyilas was born in the village of Orom in Kanjiža, Autonomous Province of Vojvodina, in what was then the People's Republic of Serbia in the Federal People's Republic of Yugoslavia. He completed primary school in his home village and secondary school in Subotica and graduated from the University of Novi Sad Faculty of Law. He was the head of the legal department at Budućnost Subotica in the 1980s, became a judge in civil litigation in 1990, and opened a law firm in 1993, specializing in civil and economic matters.

== Politician ==
=== Mayor of Kanjiža ===
Nyilas joined the VMSZ in 2008. The party contested the 2008 Serbian local elections at the head of the Hungarian Coalition (Magyar Koalíció, MK), and Nyilas received the second position on the coalition's electoral list for Kanžija. The MK won a majority victory with nineteen out of twenty-nine seats, and, when the assembly convened, Nyilas was selected as mayor. From 2010 to 2012, he also served as a member of the Chamber of Local Authorities in the Congress of Local and Regional Authorities in the Council of Europe.

He appeared in the second position on the VMSZ's list in the 2012 Serbian local elections. The list won a plurality victory with eleven seats and subsequently formed a new local coalition government; Nyilas was chosen for a second term as mayor.

=== Provincial cabinet minister ===
The Democratic Party (Demokratska stranka, DS) and its allies won a plurality victory in the 2012 Vojvodina provincial election and afterwards formed a coalition government with the VMSZ and the League of Social Democrats of Vojvodina (Liga socijaldemokrata Vojvodine, LSV). The government faced a crisis in 2014 and reconstituted the ministry in a new configuration with the same partners. Nylias was chosen as the VMSZ's representative in the new administration, becoming one of three vice-presidents (i.e., deputy prime ministers), with additional responsibilities for education, regulations, administration, and ethnic communities. In 2015, he announced that Vojvodina was ending the practice of holding Saturday classes for primary and secondary schools. In the same year, he announced a competition for schools to feature bilingual Serbian-English classes.

The Serbian Progressive Party (Srpska napredna stranka, SNS) and its allies won a majority government in the 2016 Vojvodina provincial election and formed a new administration. The VMSZ was included in the SNS's coalition, and Nyilas remained as his party's representative in government, maintaining the same ministerial responsibilities as before. He was the only minister from the outgoing DS-led administration to continue in office when the SNS took power.

Nyilas appeared in the twenty-ninth position on the VMSZ's list for the 2020 Vojvodina provincial election. This was too low a position for election to be a realistic prospect, and he was not elected when the list won eleven mandates. Following the election, he was succeeded by Zsolt Szakállas as the VMSZ's representative in the provincial ministry.

=== Secretary of State ===
In December 2020, Nyilas was chosen as a secretary of state in Serbia's ministry of justice.
