= Belgrade school shooting =

2023 mass shooting in Serbia

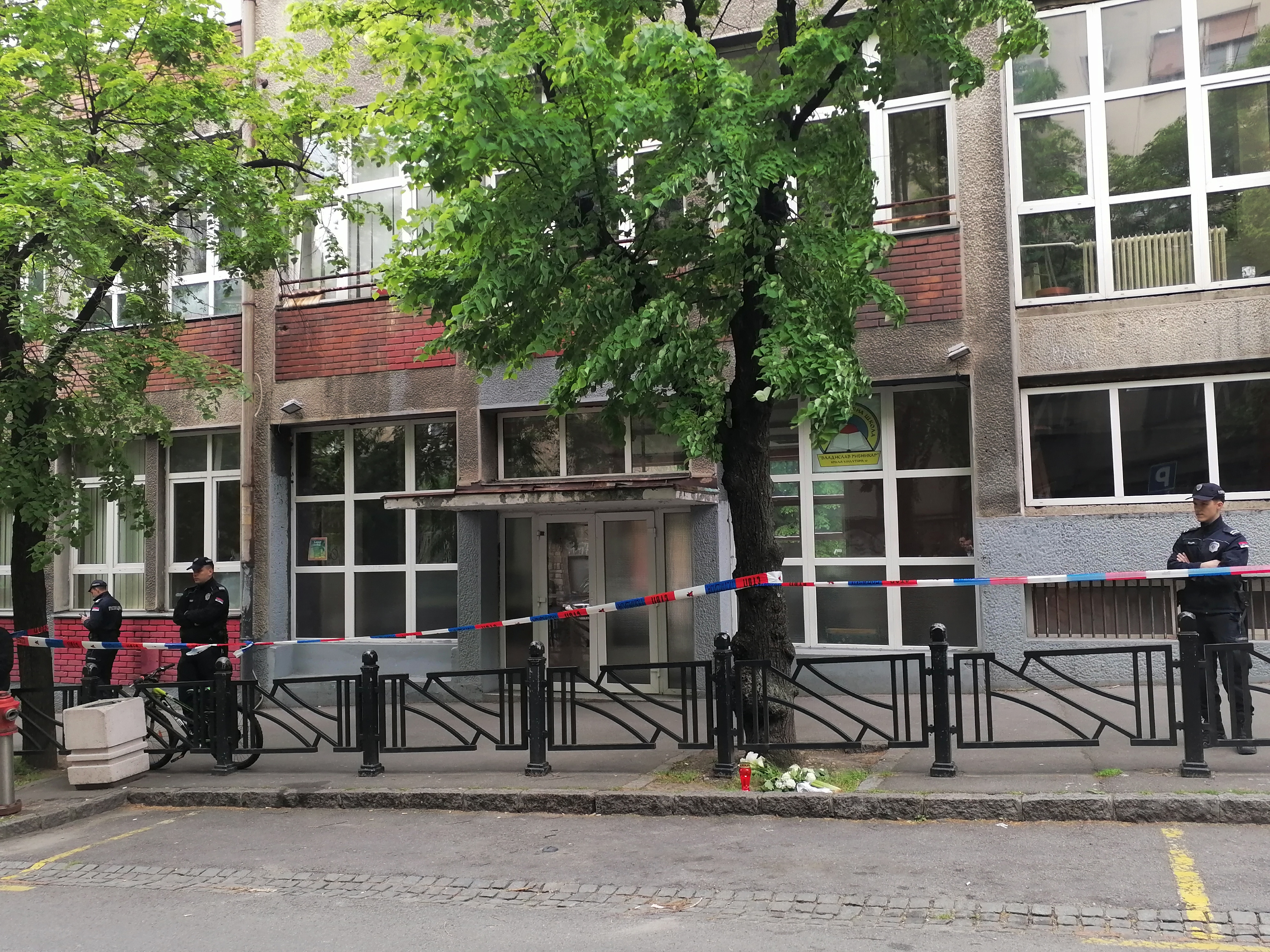
- Police in front of the school following the shooting.

- Belgrade (Belgrade)
- Location: 44°48′20″N 20°28′04″E; Vladislav Ribnikar Model Elementary School, Kralja Milutina 10, Krunski Venac, Vračar, Belgrade, Serbia
- Date: 3 May 2023; 3 years ago c. 08:40 – 08:42 (CEST, UTC+02:00)
- Target: Students attending and staff employed at Vladislav Ribnikar Model Elementary School
- Attack type: Mass shooting, school shooting, pedicide, mass murder
- Weapons: CZ-75 Shadow 2 semi-automatic pistol (9mm); Ruger MK III Standard semi-automatic pistol (.22LR) (unused); Molotov cocktails (unused)
- Deaths: 10
- Injuries: 6
- Perpetrator: Kosta Kecmanović
- Motive: Unknown
- Verdict: None
- Convictions: Kosta Kecmanović; None – age of criminal responsibility not met Vladimir Kecmanović: Acts against public safety; Child neglect; Miljana Kecmanović: Child neglect; Marinković and Ivanović: Making false statements
- Convicted: Vladimir and Miljana Kecmanović (Kecmanović's parents); Nemanja Marinković; Ratko Ivanović
- Litigation: 5 lawsuits

On the morning of 3 May 2023, a school shooting occurred at Vladislav Ribnikar Model Elementary School in the Vračar municipality of Belgrade, Serbia. The shooter, identified as 13-year-old Kosta Kecmanović, opened fire on students and staff, resulting in the deaths of ten individuals, including nine students and a security guard. Six others, five students and a teacher, also sustained injuries.

Kecmanović surrendered willingly and was taken into custody. However, due to his age being below 14, which falls below Serbia's age of criminal responsibility, he could not face legal charges. His father legally owned the firearms used in the incident. Since the apprehension, Kecmanović has been placed under the care of a psychiatric hospital located in Belgrade. Meanwhile, legal actions have been initiated against his parents. His father faced charges for acts against public safety, while the mother was charged with criminal possession of a weapon. Both parents were also later charged with child neglect. Their criminal trial began on 29 January 2024, and they were found guilty on 30 December. They were also found liable in five civil lawsuits.

The attack occurred one day before a separate mass shooting in Serbia. Both shootings caused protests in the country.

== Background ==
=== Serbia's gun laws and previous shootings ===
Despite strict gun laws, (Note: To own a gun in Serbia, citizens must prove a valid reason to own a gun, such as an ongoing threat to life or a legitimate need for hunting or sport shooting. They must submit a medical report to the Ministry of Internal Affairs, which then instructs the submitter's physician to report whenever any relevant changes in their health occur. The police may prohibit an individual's possession of a weapon when they assess that the owner could misuse it. Open carry is also not allowed; concealed carry permits are rarely issued and require proof of a threat to life.) Serbia has one of the world's highest gun ownership rates per capita. In 2021, with an estimated 39 privately owned guns per 100 people, Serbia was the third-ranked country globally in this statistic, behind the United States and Yemen. Along with a culture of gun ownership and many households keeping guns as war trophies from the 20th-century wars in the region, illegal weapons became particularly widespread in some Balkan countries following the Yugoslav Wars in the 1990s.

Mass shootings are rare in Serbia and the rest of the Balkans. There had been three earlier mass shootings in Serbia in the 21st century: the 2007 Jabukovac killings, during which nine people were killed, and five were injured; the 2013 Velika Ivanča shooting, in which 14 people were killed; and the 2016 Žitište shooting, in which five people were killed and 22 injured. In 2019, there was an attempted school shooting in Velika Plana, though the perpetrator was stopped after shooting two bullets into the ceiling. None of those shootings or the attempted shooting involved a child as the perpetrator.

=== School ===
Vladislav Ribnikar Model Elementary School (Serbian: Огледна основна школа „Владислав Рибникар”, Ogledna osnovna škola „Vladislav Ribnikar”) (Note: Named after Vladislav S. Ribnikar (1900–1955), Serbian journalist, director of Politika and Tanjug, and nephew of Vladislav F. Ribnikar.) is a public elementary school in Vračar, an affluent urban area and municipality of Belgrade. It was formed, as a project of Franco-Yugoslav friendship, in 1975, through a merger of two existing, adjacent elementary schools. The site of the modern school building had successively been the site of various historic schools dating back to the 18th century. One of the two predecessor schools (Slobodan Princip Seljo Elementary School) had been founded in 1966 as a home to the pilot educational project of teaching a foreign language – French – from the first grade on. Starting in the 1966–1967 school year, French was led by Professor Raymond Vaillier, who did not speak any Serbian. It later became the norm to provide foreign-language education to first-graders in the country. However, Vladislav Ribnikar remains noted as an elementary school focusing on French-language education.

About 1,000 students attend classes. The school provides bilingual education in Serbian and French, serving as a French immersion school teaching 50% of the curriculum in French for grades 7 and 8, and the French Ministry of Foreign Affairs grants it LabelFrancÉducation. Among Belgrade's elementary schools, it has enjoyed a somewhat higher level of recognition. It has, from time to time, been perceived as an "elite school".

There is a mural of the prince and the fox from the French novella The Little Prince on the school's wall. The mural was made by Serbian street art artist Andrej Josifovski in 2016.

== Shooting ==
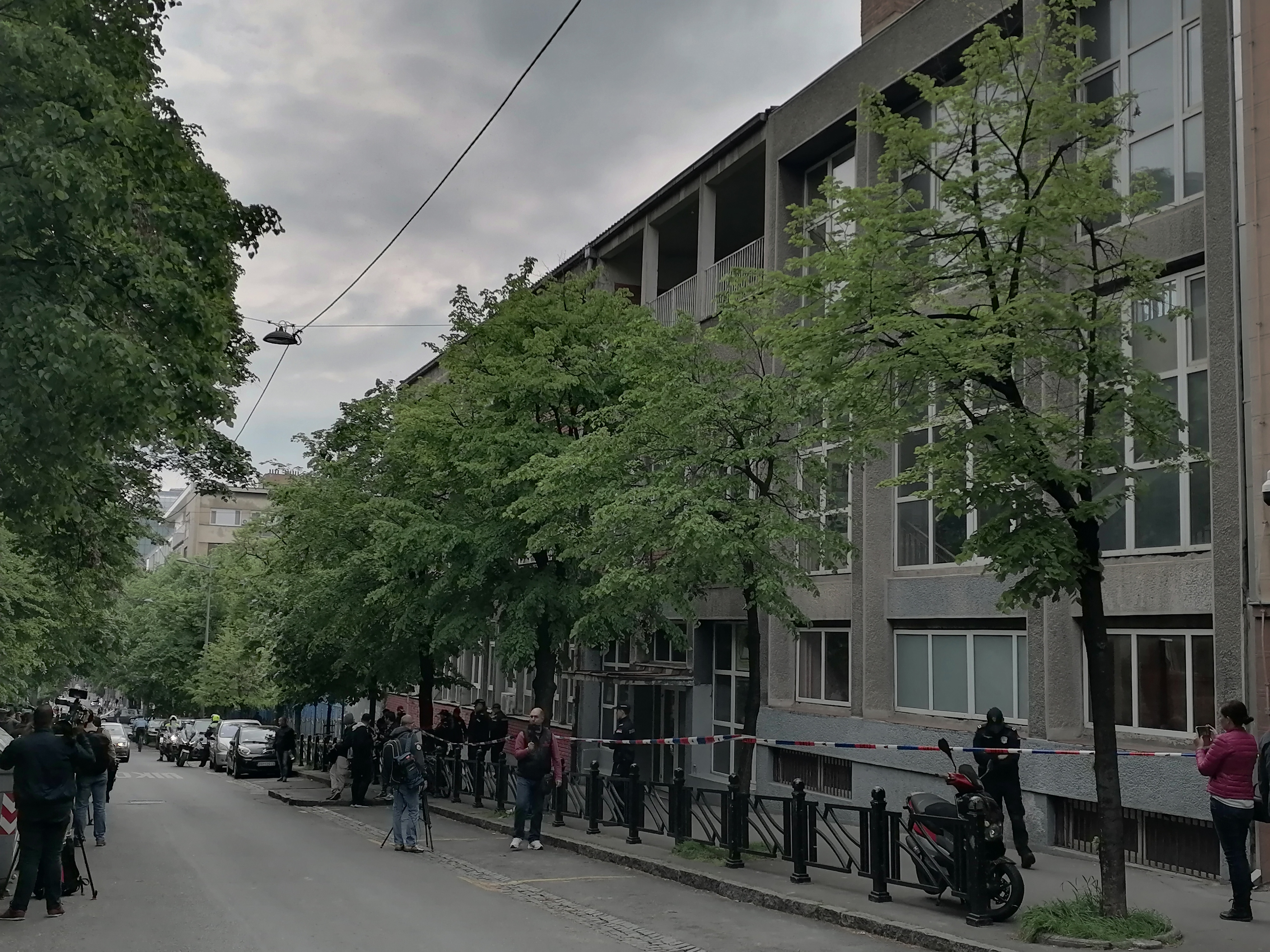
Vladislav Ribnikar school after the shooting on 3 May 2023

The shooting began at around 08:40 CEST on 3 May 2023. According to the Ministry of Internal Affairs, after entering Vladislav Ribnikar Model Elementary School, Kecmanović immediately pulled out a gun from his backpack and shot and killed the school's security guard. He then shot and killed two hall monitors that he saw in the hallway, both girls, (Note: Bojana Asović and Ana Božović) after which he reloaded his gun while heading for his classroom. Upon entering the classroom, Kecmanović shot the history teacher and then fired at numerous people, killing another seven, six of whom were girls; another five students were wounded. One student, Ema Kobiljski, confronted Kecmanović, causing 8 or 9 students to flee from the classroom. Kobiljski would later be remembered as the "heroine of the school of death." He then ran through the hallway and into the courtyard, where he contacted the police at 08:42, according to the ministry at a press conference. He had two pistols: a 9mm CZ-75 Shadow 2 and a .22 LR Ruger MK III Standard.

Students who fled in panic after the shooting found shelter in a company's premises behind the school. Njegoševa Street was closed down after the shooting. After the shooting, a blood donation for the wounded students was organized at the Transfusion Institute.

== Casualties ==
Fatalities

1. Angelina Aćimović, 14 (Note: Aćimović succumbed to injuries 12 days later in a hospital.)
2. Mara Anđelković, 13
3. Bojana Asović, 11
4. Ana Božović, 11
5. Andrija Čikić, 14
6. Adriana Dukić, 14
7. Ema Kobiljski, 13
8. Katarina Martinović, 12
9. Sofija Negić, 13
10. Dragan Vlahović, 53 (security guard)

— Various reports

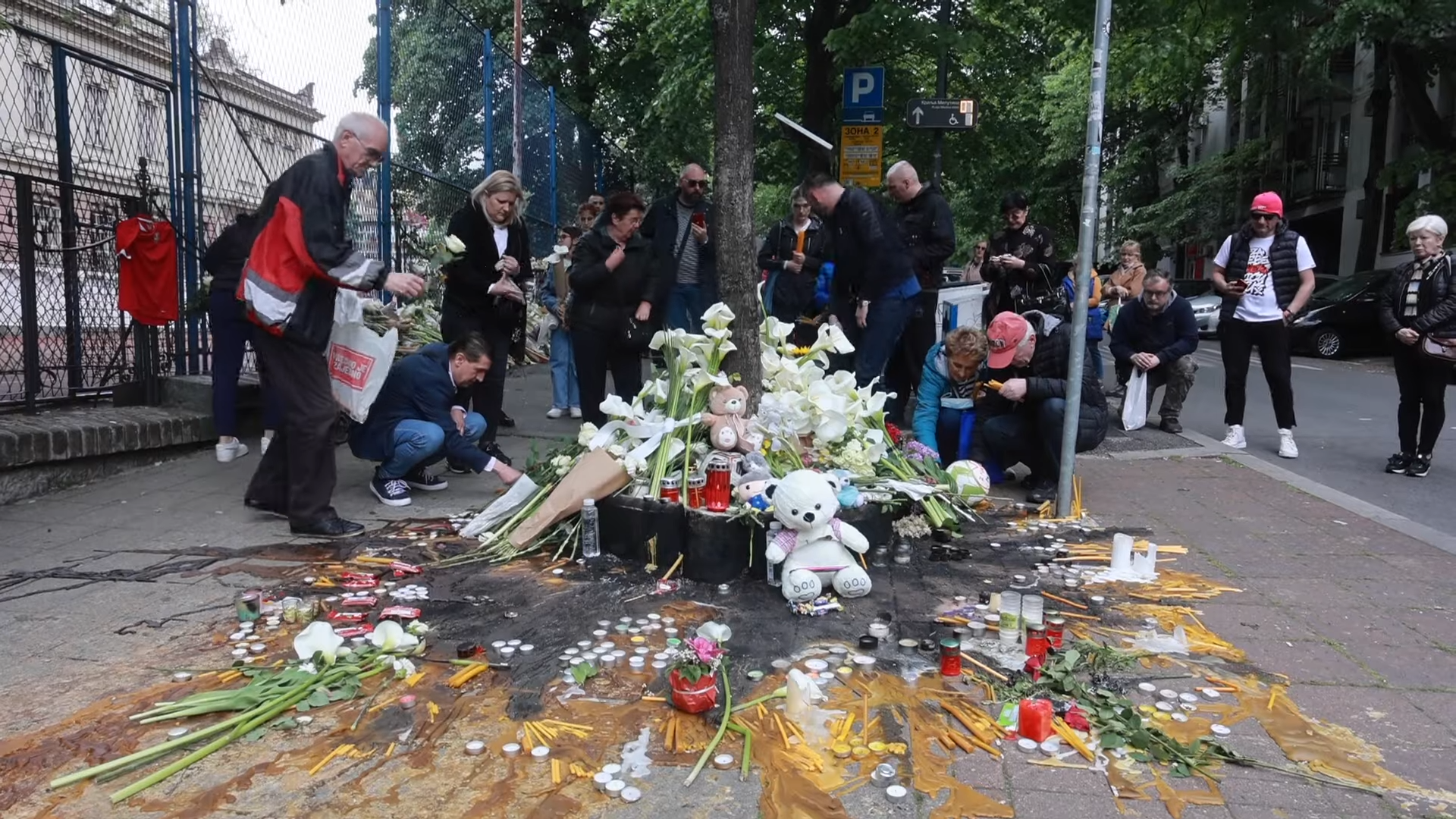
Memorial for the victims of the Belgrade School Shooting

The shooting resulted in the deaths of nine students – eight girls and one boy – and a security guard. According to the French foreign ministry, one of the deceased students, Adriana Dukić, was a French national. One girl, Ema Kobiljski, was the daughter of Dragan Kobiljski, a Serbian professional volleyball coach and former player.

In addition, six students and a teacher were injured. Of the injured, two boys and one girl were taken to the University Children's Clinic in Belgrade. The boys received gunshot wounds to their lower extremities. In contrast, the girl, who was also critically injured, received a severe head injury and had to undergo surgery. The boys and the teacher were later reported to be in stable condition. The critically injured girl, Angelina Aćimović, died of her wounds on 15 May despite urgent surgical intervention and intensive treatment measures, becoming the tenth victim in the shooting. The boy who was wounded in the spine had surgery in Chicago, Illinois, US, on 20 June 2023.

52-year-old history teacher Tatjana Stevanović, who was shot three times, underwent several surgeries at the Clinical Centre of Serbia in Belgrade. According to Večernje novosti, she is unable to walk or move her left arm. On 20 July, she was transferred to the Sokobanjska Rehabilitation Institute in Belgrade.

== Investigation ==
External media

Images
- The shooter's plan of the school and targeteted classrooms, Ringier
- The shooter's list of priority students (redacted), Ringier

Video
- Veselin Milić, head of the Belgrade Police Department, presented details about the shooting at a press conference on 3 May on YouTube (1:14)
- Chronology of the tragedy at the School in Vračar on YouTube (0:46)

Kecmanović surrendered to the police and was arrested; the police soon revealed his name to the public. The Higher Public Prosecutor's Office in Belgrade described him as a 13-year-old (born 30 July 2009) male seventh-grade student. At this age, he could not face criminal or misdemeanour charges due to the Juvenile Criminal Offenders and Criminal Protection of Juveniles Act setting the minimum age of criminal responsibility at 14; the case was referred to the Centre for Social Work. Within the school system, disciplinary action could result, at most, in moving the student to another school. (Note: Per the Law on foundations of the educational system and pedagogy. Permanent exclusion from primary education is not legally possible.)

According to the Ministry of Internal Affairs, Kecmanović had been planning the event for a month, selecting specific classrooms to target first and compiling a list of students to prioritize in the shooting. The ministry also reported that he had received training at a shooting range alongside his father, who legally owned the pistols used in the incident. Confirmed by the Kecmanović Trial, Kosta fired 45 rounds inside the classroom; however, he also fired 21 in the hallway, for a total of 66 shots fired during the shooting. Described as a quiet and academically successful student, he had recently joined the class which he targeted. The motive is currently under investigation by authorities.

Kecmanović was placed under the care of the Child and Adolescent Neurology and Psychiatry Clinic, a psychiatric hospital in Belgrade. After the Military Medical Academy had administered a drug test, he was – according to his father's attorney Irina Borović – found not to have been under the influence of psychoactive drugs. The judgment to keep the minor in the mental health institution is subject to periodic revision – conditionally pending parental consent (not as a strict requirement). As of 8 May, his mother granted permission. On 1 June, following an extraordinary school inspection, the government reported no school bullying against him. The Ministry of Internal Affairs reported that Kecmanović is under 24-hour police surveillance and any possibility of his escape from the clinic is impossible.

A few days after the shooting, Kecmanović's phone was sent for forensic examination in order to obtain new information. Kecmanović asked the staff of the psychiatric clinic where he is detained to give him a phone in order to communicate with his close online friend Luka Lekić.

On 23 May, the Higher Public Prosecutor's Office in Belgrade launched an investigation into the responsibility of the Partizan Practical Shooting Club, where Kecmanović allegedly practiced shooting with his father. The club's president Ratko Ivanović, however, claimed the younger Kecmanović had never practiced shooting at the club. Ivanović stated that while Kosta had joined his father on several occasions at the club, he had never entered the shooting range.

On 29 May, the Kecmanović's nanny was questioned by the police, where she told in detail everything she knew about his upbringing and habits. The school's psychologist and pedagogue were also questioned by the police, making in total five who were questioned, including family members and people who had or should have had close contact with him.

Forensics photos (Note: Taken after First-responders Arrived) were taken at the scene, but under Serbian Law they cannot be released, primarily because doing so would violate strict child protection laws and severely risk triggering a dangerous wave of copycat violence known as the "Werther effect."

=== Kecmanović's parents ===
Kecmanović comes from a prominent Belgrade family; his father Vladimir is a well-known radiologist, and his mother Miljana is an assistant professor of microbiology at the University of Belgrade.

Both parents were arrested shortly after the shooting; the father was detained and was questioned at a hearing on 5 May at the Higher Public Prosecutor's Office in Belgrade. During the hearing, he denied committing crimes. At the same time, the Higher Public Prosecutor's Office proposed to the High Court to keep the father in custody. According to the prosecutors, he trained his son in the handling of firearms by taking him to a shooting range, which is an activity "clearly not appropriate for his age", and he kept the guns in an improperly secured locker. He is being investigated as a suspect concerning the criminal offence of "grave acts against public security". The court approved his detention for 30 days. His 30-day detention was re-extended twice; on 2 June and 30 June. On 28 July, his detention was re-extended for three months. As of October, the Institute for Forensic Medicine in Belgrade did not submit the ballistics medical expertise, which is crucial for making a decision on indictment against the father.

On 22 May, the prosecutor's office began collecting evidence against the mother, suspecting her of criminal child neglect. During her testimony, the mother provided a detailed account of Kecmanović's upbringing, his physical well-being, his interactions with peers, and their familial dynamics. According to her statement, the mother asserted that she did not observe any abnormal behaviour in her son on the morning of the shooting, except for his sluggishness during breakfast and while getting ready. She further claimed that she dropped off her daughter at school and left her son home to prepare himself. Approximately one hour later, the mother received news of the shooting at the school. Initially, she informed the authorities that she believed her son had been injured in the incident and promptly rushed to the school, where she subsequently learned the truth.

The High Court in Belgrade prohibited the Kecmanović's family from disposing of their property in Belgrade: to the father on 14 June and to the mother on 23 June. On 24 June, the police detained the mother at the Prohor Pčinjski border crossing adjoining North Macedonia when she tried to leave the country with her daughter. Reportedly, the mother had planned to go on a short vacation with her daughter, following a recommendation from their therapist; she told investigators at first that she originally did not plan to move countries due to the situation that she was in. On 30 June, the High Court in Belgrade prohibited the mother from disposing of or mortgaging her property in Paraćin and Niš. On 12 July, the court ordered the National Bank of Serbia to transfer the money the father had at his disposal to the bailiff's deposit. The deposit, up to the amount of money of legal claims of the families of the murdered, will be in the bailiff's deposition, which he will keep until the conclusion of the proceedings. On 21 August, the Appellate Court in Belgrade confirmed the decisions of the High Court in Belgrade.

On 23 July 2024, Kecmanović's mother's car was confiscated by court order. This interim measure requested by the family members of the victims was the reason for the initiation of a civil action. In this regard, 27 members of the victims' families initiated a civil action in which they sued Kecmanović and his parents.

Criminal trial of Kecmanović's parents began on 29 January 2024. On 30 December, they were convicted for failing to secure the firearm used in the incident. Vladimir Kecmanović was sentenced to 14.5 years' imprisonment while Miljana Kecmanović was sentenced to three years. A gun instructor, Nemanja Marinković, who taught Kosta how to use a gun, received a prison term of one year and three months.

=== Kecmanović's questioning ===
Kecmanović was questioned on 18 July 2023 in the case against his father related to acts against public safety. The lawyers of the families of deceased students attended the questioning, three parents from two families, and the father's defence attorney, as well as the prosecutor who conducted the hearing. Kecmanović was heard via video link, and it lasted four hours. He was questioned by a psychologist at the psychiatric hospital, to whom the prosecutor asked questions through headphones.

According to Blic, Kecmanović gave answers to five questions:

1. Did his father mistreat him?
2. What was the relationship in the family between mother, father and sister?
3. Did his father take him to the shooting range?
4. Did his father teach him to shoot?
5. Did his father give him the passcode to the gun safe?

Kecmanović said his father did not provide him with first contact with firearms but by an instructor at the shooting range. His father taught him how to shoot, load the gun, and change cartridges. He also said that his father "admired how he shoots accurately". Furthermore, according to his father's attorney, he said that he had changed his mind and regretted committing the shooting, and if he could turn back time, he would not do it again. He did not give a specific reason for walking into the school with guns and firing shots at his peers. Also, he said his father had additional measures to secure firearms. The gun safe had a three-digit passcode. His father also had a passcode on the gun's trigger. He explained how he got guns in the safe and under the passcode. He said that he struggled for a long time to crack the codes and searched for a long time on how to obtain firearms. On the other side, according to Zora Dobričanin Nikodinović, the attorney of the family of one of the victims, he did say "some sentences that state like regret, but do not sound like that". Also, this attorney said there was no doubt that the guns were inadequately secured.

Kecmanović also said that he played the tactical shooter video game Valorant and got the idea when he watched a documentary film in which mass murder was mentioned. He also stated he watched a documentary about mass shooting at Columbine High School and researched it,claming it was the inspiration for the shooting he committed.Speaking about family relations during the hearing, he said the house had no special rules. There was no discipline except for the "mild discipline of confiscating the mobile phone". He and his sister were expected to be friendly and cultured. He described his relationship with his father as good and his mother as caring, compassionate, intelligent, and fair. He said his parents got along well and that now he misses his father, mother, sister, dog, and uncle.

== Civil lawsuits ==
On 21 July 2023, the family of one of the victims filed a civil lawsuit against Kecmanović's mother, seeking compensation for their child's death. They also filed lawsuit against Kecmanović himself, his father, school and Republic of Serbia. On 5 November 2025, verdict was announced, finding Kecmanović, his parents and school liable, and while Republic of Serbia was found not liable.

On 9 August 2023, the parents and family members of the victims, a total of 27 claimants filed a lawsuit against Kecmanović, his parents and school. The lawsuit was filed in civil proceedings for non-material damage compensation for mental pain suffered due to the death of a close person, as well as for the fear suffered. With this lawsuit, a monetary annuity was requested, that is, the future payment of a certain amount of money from the day of the judgment until the conditions for it last – in the name of future non-material damages for mental pain suffered due to the death of a close person. The preliminary hearing was held on 20 October 2023. Trial in that lawsuit ended on 30 December 2024, and verdict was announced on 19 March 2025. Kecmanović, his parents and school were all found liable and were ordered to pay to each person an amount ranging from 68 000 to 111 000 euros.

In January 2024, Tatjana Stevanović, a history teacher who was injured in the shooting, filed a lawsuit against Kecmanović's parents. Trial in Stevanović's lawsuit began on 24 June 2024 and ended on 25 April 2025. The verdict was announced on 21 May 2025, finding the parents liable and ordering them to pay 58 800 euros to Stevanović.

In February 2024, two more lawsuits were filed against Kecmanović's parents by parents of two children injured in the shooting, bringing the total number of civil lawsuits related to the shooting to five. Trial in first of these two lawsuits, in which Kecmanović himself and school were sued as well, began on 29 March 2024 and ended on 5 June 2025, with verdict being announced on 25 July 2025, finding Kecmanović, his parents and school liable. Trial in the second of these lawsuits began on 21 May 2024, and on the 31 December 2025, parents were found liable.

== Aftermath ==
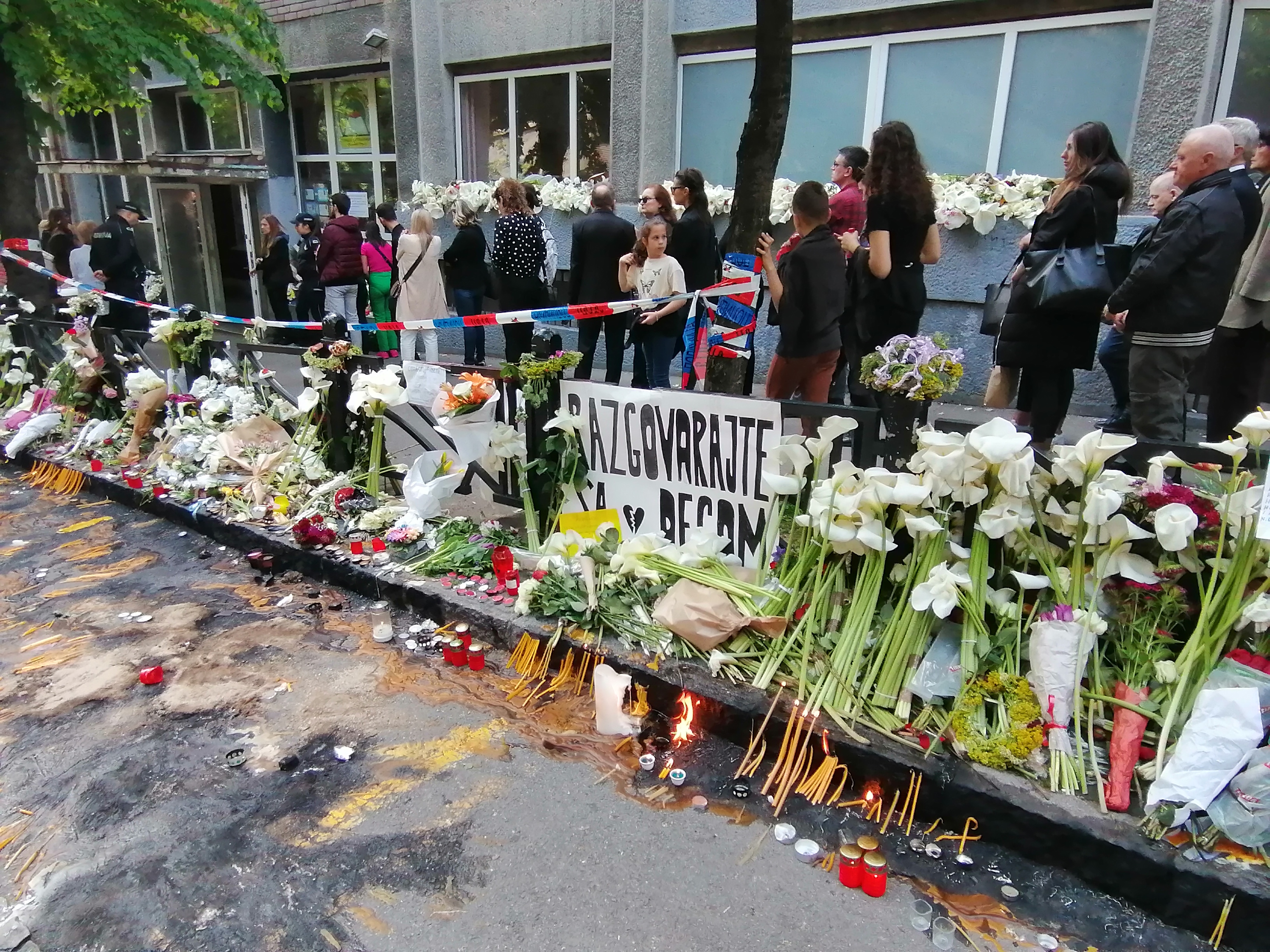
Flowers laid down in front of the Vladislav Ribnikar Model Elementary School after a shooting two days before. In addition, there is a sign with the inscription: "Razgovarajte sa decom" (translated to English: "Talk to the kids").

=== Official measures ===
President of Serbia Aleksandar Vučić addressed the public about the shooting later in the day, saying that he would propose new gun measures to the government, as well as lowering the minimum age of criminal responsibility from 14 to 12. The government adopted the policy agenda the next day. The new measures also included a moratorium on gun permits, more medical and psychological checks on gun owners, and hiring 1,200 police officers for schools.

At a press conference, Education Minister Branko Ružić announced three national days of mourning starting from 5 May and a suspension of classes for the rest of the day, while Health Minister Danica Grujičić announced that the Institute of Mental Health would activate two telephone counselling helplines and increase access to in-person counselling, for those who feel the need for psychological support. The National Theatre in Belgrade suspended all activities until 7 May. Vučić also cancelled his attendance at the coronation of Charles III and Camilla in London; in response, Charles III expressed his condolences.

On 11 May, the government formed the Peer Violence Prevention Council, headed by Prime Minister Ana Brnabić. The constitutive session of the council was held on 30 May. The council will focus on reducing peer violence.

A team of psychotherapists from Norway, who dealt with the trauma suffered by their citizens after the terror attacks committed by Anders Behring Breivik in 2011, will come to Serbia to help due to their similar experience.

==== Hand Over Your Weapons ====
On 8 May, the Serbian Ministry of Internal Affairs offered a one-month amnesty for surrendering illegal or unregistered weapons and ammunition. Initially set to end on 8 June, the call, known as Hand Over Your Weapons (Serbian: Предај оружје, Predaj oružje), had extended the deadline to 30 June. The ministry reported that citizens handed over 78,302 firearms, 4,085,000 rounds of ammunition, and 25,914 pieces of ordnance by the end of the call.

==== Inquiry Committee ====
On 18 July, MNA Marinika Tepić was elected as the chairperson of the National Assembly's Inquiry Committee to determine the facts and circumstances that led to the mass murders at the school shooting and Mladenovac and Smederevo shootings. However, three days later, National Assembly suspended further proceedings of the Inquiry Committee until the criminal proceedings were ongoing, following the request of the victims' families.

=== Continuation of classes ===
==== 2022–23 school year ====
More than 200 parents of students from the Vladislav Ribnikar Model Elementary School joined the initiative to suspend classes in the existing school building immediately and to conclude the 2022–23 school year on 3 May, when the shooting happened. On 22 May, the Vladislav Ribnikar School continued their classes for the first time after the shooting incident. Six police officers will be present in the school. Since 5 June, all students have been attending classes in the afternoon shift at Sveti Sava Elementary School.

On 1 June, the Government of Serbia announced that the 2022–23 school year ends on 6 June instead of 20 June. The government also said that schools can continue to work until 20 June for students who wish to do so. In that period, supplementary, additional and preparatory classes, classes in nature, as well as other forms of educational work, can be implemented to encourage students' social and emotional skills and activities on the topics of tolerance, empathy, togetherness, support and gratitude. They also said that all students unsatisfied with their success will have the opportunity to improve their grades at their request until 20 June. This decision shocked parents, students and professors as it came almost one month after the shooting without an announcement before. The decision was heavily criticised because of the way that it was announced, which unions called disrespectful to education workers. It was also criticised because it was vague and unclear how professors were supposed to conclude grades. Ana Dimitrijević from Forum of Belgrade's Gymnasiums called this decision hasty and humiliating.

==== 2023–24 school year ====
On 1 September, the 2023–24 school year began regularly as planned. At the Ribnikar school, works on the renovation of the school's interior and exterior facade, as well as two gymnasiums, are nearing completion. A questionnaire made by the Norwegian psychotherapists for assessing the degree of traumatic experience will be presented at the Ribnikar school.

Four months after the shooting, employees of the Ribnikar school planted ten cedar trees in pots in front of the school door in memory of the victims.

=== Kecmanović's further education ===
In August, Kecmanović's mother, according to Blic, addressed the institutions with a request to resolve the issue of further education of her two children, him and his younger sister, from 1 September. Also, online education is an option for him due to his placement under the care of the Child and Adolescent Neurology and Psychiatry Clinic.

On 21 August, the Vladislav Ribnikar School Teachers' Council decided to expel him from their school. However, the Education Minister Slavica Đukić Dejanović explained that it is not possible for the Teachers' Council to exclude a student from a school. Also, she added that Kecmanović could continue his elementary education in the Dragan Hercog Elementary School in Belgrade, the only school in Serbia which teaches students who cannot continue normal elementary education due to health problems. The school's director Zoran Aleksić confirmed that he will continue his education in the school and that it is yet to be determined which education model will be used in his case.

=== Protests ===
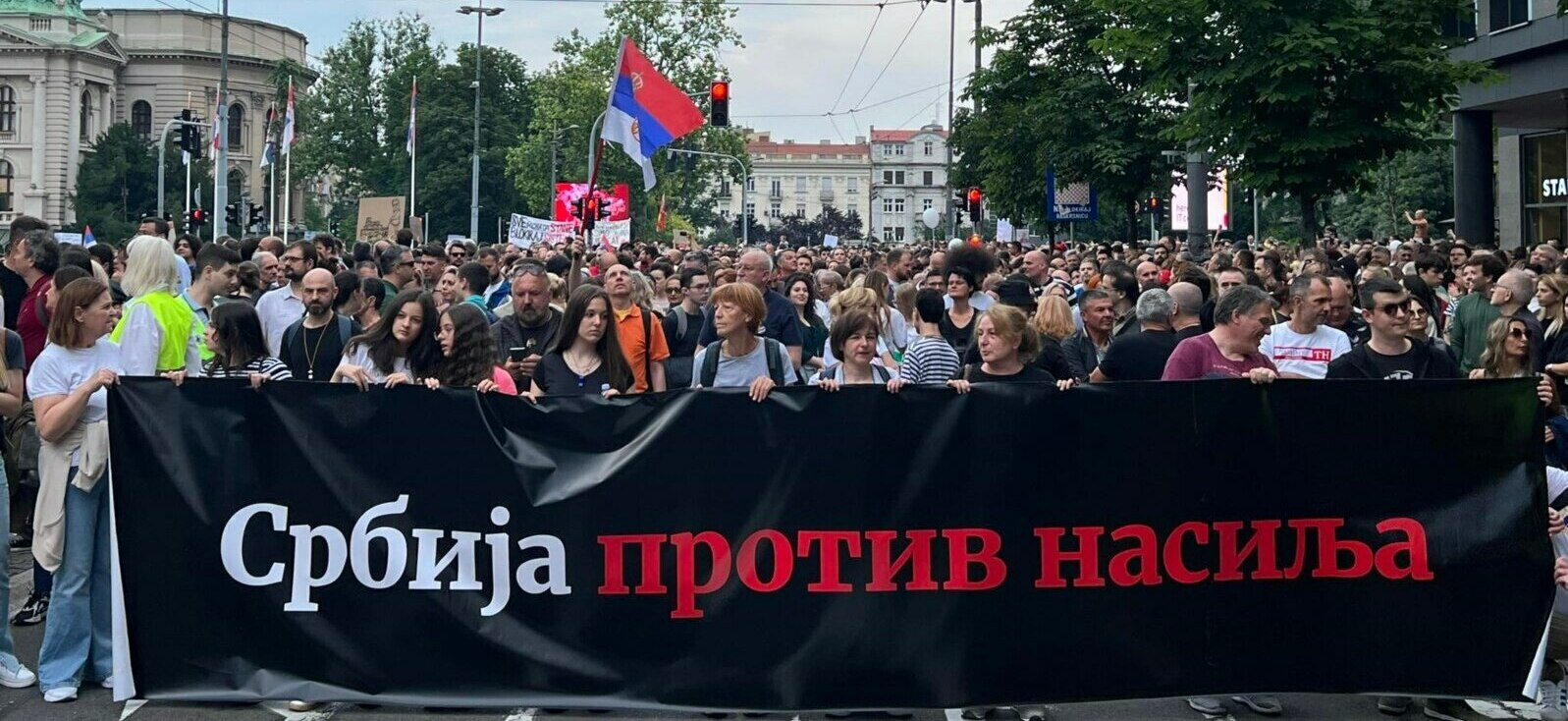
Demonstrators in Belgrade on 17 June carrying a banner with the inscription: "Србија против насиља" (transl. Serbia Against Violence)

Hundreds of citizens, including the parents of the elementary school students, had gathered in front and around the elementary school after the shooting. They later protested in front of the Ministry of Health and the Ministry of Education buildings, where they demanded Ružić's resignation. The protests grew larger the next day. Citizens in cities such as Novi Sad, Niš, Kragujevac, and neighbouring countries paid their respects on the day of the shooting.

Following the shootings, opposition parties, namely the Ujedinjeni parliamentary group, People's Party, Do not let Belgrade drown, Together, Democratic Party, and Dveri announced that they would organise a protest against violence on 8 May. The protestors met in front of the country's parliament before marching in silence through the streets near Serbian government offices to demanded the resignation of Vulin, Gašić, Ružić, and the Council of the Regulatory Authority for Electronic Media, as well as cancelling programmes that promote violence and shutting down media and tabloids that publish false news and violate the Journalistic Code. In response, Prime Minister Brnabić accused them of "politicising" the shootings. Tens of thousands of people gathered in Belgrade and several other cities in Serbia (Novi Sad, Kragujevac, Kraljevo, and Čačak) on 8 May for the "Serbia Against Violence" protest, reacting to two mass murders. According to the organisers, the protest in Belgrade was attended by approximately 50,000 demonstrators. The second protest was held on 12 May; it began in front of the National Assembly of Serbia building while the demonstrators continued walking to the Gazela Bridge, and it ended at Sava Centar. Another "Serbia Against Violence" protest was held a day later in Kragujevac.

=== Domino effect arrests ===
More than ten arrests were made in the first week following the shooting involving juveniles and/or school-related misdemeanours.

- On 5 May, a 13-year-old boy from Kruševac posted on his Instagram account that he planned to "repeat this massacre on Friday".
- On 6 May, the police brought in for questioning a minor who was filming herself on TikTok and making fun of the murders at the Vračar school.
- On 6 May, the police in Novi Sad arrested three boys who published photos of weapons they wanted to take to school.
- On 6 May, the police in Niš arrested a 17-year-old because he threatened on his Instagram account that "more than 30 people will be killed in Niš."
- On 6 May, the police in Sremska Mitrovica arrested a 22-year-old because he posted on social media that the subsequent shooting would be in Sremska Mitrovica.
- On 7 May, a man from the Belgrade suburb of Leštane was arrested after calling the police, stating that he would commit a copycat massacre.
- On 8 May, the police in Kikinda arrested an 18-year-old who posted a classroom drawing with bloody figures lying next to desks while one was holding an object similar to a handgun.
- On 9 May, the police in Subotica apprehended a boy who planned to commit a massacre with a bomb. The U.S. Federal Bureau of Investigation (FBI) found him.
- On 9 May, an 18-year-old from Kraljevo was arrested because he posted on social media that the Vračar shooter was released from custody and would come to kill half of the students in his school. The Kraljevo police also arrested two minor boys who posted photos from school on social media in which they were holding a handgun.
- On 9 May, the Montenegrin police in Žabljak apprehended a minor who supported the Vračar shooter on social media.
- On 10 May, the police in Sombor apprehended an 18-year-old who posted on social media and verbally confirmed that he would take an automatic rifle to his school.
- On 10 May, the police in Vrnjačka Banja apprehended a 15-year-old who threatened his classmates on social media.
- On 15 May, a 14-year-old female student cut a classmate with a knife in Zrenjanin. The police apprehended her mother.
- On 15 May, the police in Novi Sad apprehended a 14-year-old girl who threatened her classmates and glorified the shooter on social media.
- On 16 June, the police apprehended a man who left a baseball cap with a plastic bullet in front of the Ribnikar School during the fortieth-day memorial service.

From 3 May to 7 July, criminal charges were filed against 82 students over 14 years old for endangering safety and spreading panic and disorder through social networks. Of them, 29 were arrested and taken to judicial authorities for further action.

In addition to these arrests, on 18 May, the police evacuated students from the Stari Grad Electrical Engineering School in Belgrade following an unknown person threatening to come armed to the school.

=== Other ===
Slovenian NBA All-Star Luka Dončić, who is of partial Serbian descent, offered to pay the funeral expenses of the murdered. However, Belgrade's local administration later announced that it would do so instead.

The Serbian writer Vladimir Kecmanović found himself the target of attacks on social media after speculations emerged that his book Kad đavoli polete (transl. When the Devils Fly) was an inspiration to the underage shooter, who committed mass murder. The writer has the same first and last name as the shooter's father, and they are distant relatives.

In July 2023, T-shirts with the redacted shooter's face were advertised and sold on a well-known online shopping platform based in Morocco.

== Reactions ==
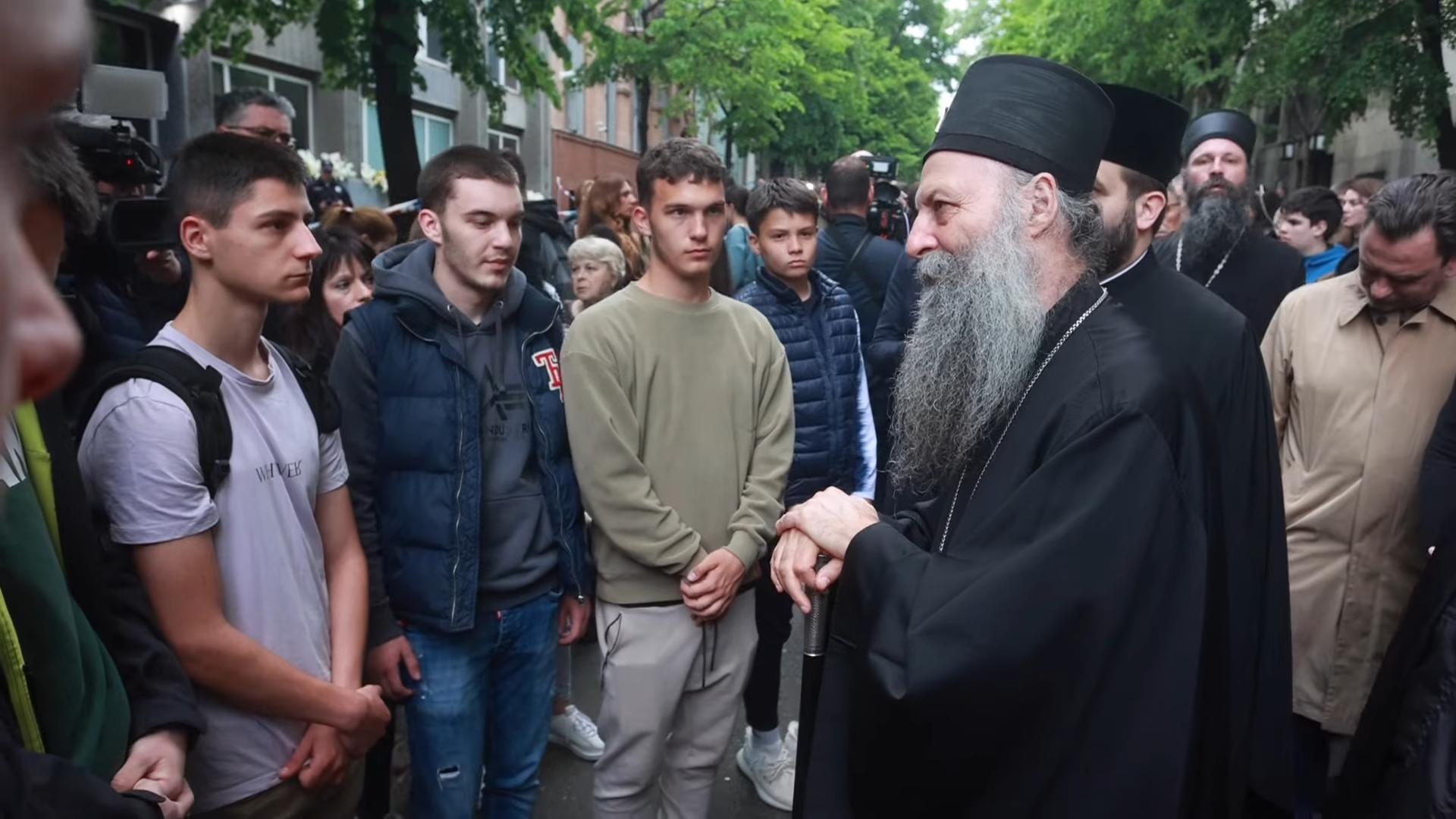
Serbian Patriarch Porfirije with students in front of the school

The UNICEF office in Serbia said that school "is not a place for violence of any kind". At the same time, the Serbian Patriarch Porfirije described it as a "catastrophe the likes of which had never happened to our people before". The Council of Ministers of Bosnia and Herzegovina declared 5 May a national day of mourning in the country following the shooting, while the Government of Montenegro declared 7 May a national day of mourning.

At the press conference, Ružić said, "A cancerous, pernicious influence of Internet video games, so-called Western values, is evident". Opposition parties called for his resignation due to the statement, including the Youth Initiative for Human Rights and the Independent Union of Educators of Serbia, which announced that it would suspend work in all schools from 4 May. The Education Trade Union of Serbia announced that it would organise a general strike starting on 5 May and called on the government to "create conditions for a normal and safe life of children and employees in the education system". Former education minister Srđan Verbić expressed his opposition to the dismissal of Ružić but said that "it would be good for the whole situation if he offered his resignation as a personal act". In contrast, former education minister Mladen Šarčević said the shooting "primarily occurred due to the carelessness of the parents". By the end of the three-day national mourning, on 7 May, Ružić had resigned from his position.

On 4 May, KK Partizan wore the full black uniform in the EuroLeague Playoff Game 4 in Belgrade, honouring the victims of the shooting. After his team won the Croatian Volleyball League for the 2022–23 season, the head coach of Mladost Zagreb, Ratko Peris, dedicated the title to Dragan Kobiljski's daughter killed in the shooting.

The Serbian Party Oathkeepers demanded an urgent session of the Education Committee at the National Assembly of Serbia, while the Movement for the Restoration of the Kingdom of Serbia called for "all reality shows that glorify violence" to be banned. The Mayor of Belgrade, Aleksandar Šapić, expressed his condolences, adding that the city government would "provide any kind of help the families need".

== See also ==
- List of massacres in Serbia
- List of youngest killers
- List of attacks related to primary schools
- List of national days of mourning (2020–present)
- List of school massacres by death toll
