= List of massacres in Serbia =

The following is a list of massacres in Serbia.

== List ==
Name	Date	Location	Deaths	Notes
Slaughter of the Knezes	23–29 January 1804	Valjevo	(c.) 80	Mass killing of Serb nobles by renegade Janissary officers.
Surdulica massacre	November 1915–February 1916	Surdulica	2,000–3,000	Mass executions of Serbian men by Bulgarian authorities.
Novi Sad killings	23–24 November 1923	Novi Sad	8	Spree killing.
Jablanica killings	19–20 July 1928	Jablanica	6	Spree killing.
Židije killings	24 April 1930	Židilje	5	Spree killing.
Pančevo executions	21–22 April 1941	Pančevo	36	Execution of Serbian civilians by the Wehrmacht.
Kruševac executions	23 September 1941 – 12 June 1944	Kruševac	1,642	Mass shootings of people by the German army.
Mačva massacres	24 September – 9 October 1941	Mačva region	c. 6,000	Serbian civilians killed in reprisals during anti-Partisan operations led by German, Ustaše and Hungarian forces.
Kraljevo massacre	15–21 October 1941	Kraljevo	c. 2,000	Mass execution of civilians by the German army.
Kragujevac massacre	20–21 October 1941	Kragujevac	2,778	Mass execution of Serbian men and boys by the German army.
Valjevo executions	27 November 1941	Valjevo	c. 300	Execution of at least 261 out of 365 Partisan POWs by Wehrmacht and Serbian collaborators. The Partisans were handed over to Germans by Mihailović's Chetniks with Pećanac Chetniks serving as intermediary.
Novi Sad raid	4–29 January 1942	Bačka region	3,000–4,000	Mass killings of civilians by Hungarian forces.
Bloody January of Banat	3-9 January 1942	Velika Kikinda, Petrovgrad, Mokrin, Dragutinovo, Banatsko Aranđelovo	159	Public exaction of hostages as reprisal for the killing of three Germans by the Partisans.
Žabalj massacre	6-9 January 1942	Žabalj	Hundreds	Massacre of civilians by Hungarian forces at Žabalj.
Gospođinci massacre	6-7 January 1942	Gospođinci	100	Massacre of civilians by Hungarian forces at Gospođinci.
Čurug massacre	6–9 January 1942	Čurug	900	Massacre of civilians by Hungarian forces at Čurug.
Đurđevo massacre	6-7 January 1942	Đurđevo	300	Massacre of civilians by Hungarian forces at Đurđevo.
Titel massacre	6-7 January 1942	Titel	60–80	Massacre of civilians by Hungarian forces at Titel.
Temerin massacre	7-9 January 1942	Temerin	37	Massacre of Jews by Hungarian forces at Temerin.
Bečej raid	27 January 1942	Bečej	215	Massacre of civilians by Hungarian forces.
Drugovac massacre	29 April 1944	Smederevo	72	Mass killing by the Yugoslav royalist Chetniks.
Srijemska Kamenica massacre	October 1944	Sremska Kamenica	196	Executions of civilians by Yugoslav Partisans.
Purges in Serbia	1944–1945	Serbia region	80,000–100,000	Yugoslav Communist war crime
Paraćin massacre	3 September 1987	Paraćin	5	Spree killing
Bačka killings	March 1993	Pačir, Subotica, Aleksandrovo, Bajmok	9	Spree killing.
Vranje shooting	3 June 1993	Vranje	8	Spree killing.
Leskovac shootings	26–27 July 2002	Leskovac	7	Spree killing.
Jabukovac killings	27 July 2007	Jabukovac	9	Spree killing.
Velika Ivanča shooting	9 April 2013	Velika Ivanča	14	Spree killing.
Kanjiža shootings	17 May 2015	Kanjiža	7	Spree killing.
Žitište shooting	2 July 2016	Žitište	5	Spree killing.
2019 Jabukovac massacre	9 August 2019	Jabukovac	4	Spree killing.
Belgrade school shooting	3 May 2023	Belgrade	10	School shooting.
Mladenovac and Smederevo shootings	4 May 2023	Mladenovac, Smederevo	9	Spree killing.

Crimes of World War I
Crimes of World War II

== See also ==
- List of massacres in Yugoslavia
- List of mass executions and massacres in Yugoslavia during World War II

== Sources ==
- Mitrović, Andrej (2007). Serbia's Great War, 1914–1918. West Lafayette, Indiana: Purdue University Press. ISBN 978-1-55753-477-4.
- Mojzes, Paul (2011). Balkan Genocides: Holocaust and Ethnic Cleansing in the 20th Century. Lanham, Maryland: Rowman & Littlefield. ISBN 978-1-4422-0665-6.
- Kay, Alex (2021). Empire of Destruction: A History of Nazi Mass Killing. United Kingdom: Yale University Press. ISBN 978-0300234053.
- Tomasevich, Jozo (2001). War and Revolution in Yugoslavia, 1941–1945: Occupation and Collaboration. Stanford, California: Stanford University Press. ISBN 978-0-8047-3615-2.
