= Daja =

Daja may refer to:

- Sefer Daja
- Daja Kisubo
