= Kanjiža shootings =

2015 mass shooting in Kanjiža, Serbia

- Location: Orom and Martonoš, Kanjiža, Vojvodina, Serbia
- Date: 17 May 2015
- Target: Relatives
- Attack type: Mass shooting, familicide
- Weapon: Shotgun
- Deaths: 7 (including the perpetrator)
- Injuries: 1
- Perpetrator: Rade Šefer

On 17 May 2015, Rade Šefer went on a killing spree in the villages of Orom and Martonoš, near Kanjiža, Vojvodina, Serbia. Šefer shot seven of his relatives, killing six and wounding one. A bystander then struck Šefer with a chair, after which he collapsed and was then strangled by his aunt's husband.

== Perpetrator ==
Rade Šefer (Serbian Cyrillic: Раде Шефер) was a 55-year-old who lived in Senta. He was an avid hunter and a member of the local hunting club, where he was one of its best scorers.

== Background ==
Rade Šefer did not like his son's wife and did not want them to marry. He blamed his ex-wife for this marriage, whom he was angry at for divorcing him the previous year. He was also angry that his son had planned to live in France after the marriage. Nevertheless, he was present at his son's wedding on 16 May 2015. He got very drunk at the wedding. At the wedding, he wanted to reconcile with his ex-wife, persuading her to return and arranging a scandal with her.

After the wedding, he followed the car of his ex-wife and younger son, and at about 4:30 a.m., he overtook them and blocked the road. He continued to quarrel with them and attacked them. The son called the police, and Šefer was arrested for violent behavior. He was released around 8 a.m. After that, he went home, took a gun and went to Orom.

== Shootings ==
In Orom, he shot his wife's parents in their home. Then he went to Martonoš. At about 10 a.m., he broke into the house and shouted, "Bitches, I'm going to kill you all." There were at least 20 people in the house who were there after the wedding party. There he shot and killed his son's wife, her parents, his ex-wife and wounded his wife's aunt in the shoulders and chest. When his son heard the shots and screaming and came to find out what was going on, Šefer aimed a shotgun at him and pulled the trigger, but failed to shoot him. The son ran away from him, and Šefer shouted, "Come back, bitch, and I'll kill you." While reloading, the wounded aunt's husband hit Šefer in the neck with a chair, after which he fell and his aunt's husband strangled him. The autopsy revealed that he was choking on blood. A lot of ammunition was found in his car.

== See also ==
- List of massacres in Serbia
- List of rampage killers (familicides in Europe)
