= Šefer =

Šefer is a surname. Notable people with the surname include:

- Bela Šefer (1899–1971), Yugoslav footballer
- Franjo Šefer (born 1905), Yugoslav tennis player
- Rade Šefer (c. 1960–2015), Serbian serial killer
