= Leskovac shootings =

2002 mass shooting in Leskovac, Yugoslavia

- Location: Leskovac, Jablanica District, Federal Republic of Yugoslavia
- Date: July 26 – July 27, 2002
- Attack type: Spree shooting
- Weapon: Zastava M70 automatic rifle
- Deaths: 8 (including the perpetrator)
- Injuries: 4
- Perpetrator: Dragan Čedić

Between July 26 and July 27, 2002, Dragan Čedić shot and killed seven people and wounded four others in Leskovac, Jablanica District, Yugoslavia.

== Shootings ==
On July 26, 2002, at 11:55 p.m. in Leskovac, Dragan Čedić shot and killed a man and wounded another with an automatic rifle at the Sedam billiard club. Five minutes later, he went to his wife's house. He first shot his wife and her sister, then shot another sister and her husband. He also shot a neighbor near the house and wounded another. Then he went to the house where his wife's aunt and mother lived. There he shot his wife's aunt and wounded her aunt's husband and son. The shootings ended at 12:20 a.m. on July 27, 2002. He fled after the shooting. Police searched for him for days, but could not find him. That night they found his car. People reported seeing him in various places, but none of these reports were actually true. His body was found in a forest near Leskovac on September 1, 2002, having shot himself with a pistol at about 11 a.m. on July 27. A pistol and a grenade were found near him.

== Perpetrator ==
Dragan Čedić.

Thirty-two-year-old Dragan Čedić (Serbian Cyrillic: Драган Чедић) lived in Leskovac, where graduated from the Higher Veterinary School. He rented a kiosk at a market selling contraband smuggled from Bulgaria. Colleagues described him as a calm man who had seizures, which became stronger over the years and were manifested by strong shocks of the head, and then loud screams. According to his wife's relatives, Dragan refused to see a doctor in Leskovac, but there is evidence that he consulted doctors in Belgrade. It is believed that for these reasons he was discharged from the army during the 1999 Kosovo War only about twenty days later. In the years leading up to the shooting, the police received several complaints against him. Dragan married a woman named Biljana nine years before the shooting, whose parents were against their wedding. They are survived by an eight-year-old daughter named Marija. Shortly after the wedding, Dragan became very jealous and dominant and often kept her in a room for days. She could not look out the window, nor did she dare to go to the phone, as he forbade her to contact anyone. When she resisted, he beat her. During one of his trips to Bulgaria in October 2001, Biljana and her daughter ran away from him. She took some personal belongings, several tens of thousands of dinars and rented a house with the money. In May 2002, Biljana returned home to her parents, after which she filed for divorce. Dragan was allowed to visit and take his daughter with him. Biljana accused him of physical violence. Police visited Biljana's parents' home several times and Dragan threatened to kill his father-in-law. For 8 years, Biljana's mother complained about Dragan to the police and various social services. He said he would kill his wife if she did not return to him. There was also information that Dragan was carrying a list of people he was going to kill and showing it to his friends.

== See also ==
- List of massacres in Serbia
