= Corruption in Serbia =

Corruption in Serbia describes the prevention and occurrence of corruption in Serbia. Corruption levels are perceived to be high by surveyed residents of Serbia, and public trust in key institutions remains low. Under Aleksandar Vučić, Serbia in 2025 reached its all time worst score in the Corruption Perceptions Index due to his increasingly authoritarian regime. Opposition to corruption in Serbia has led to the 2024–2026 Serbian anti-corruption protests.

== Dynamics ==
Public procurement, public administration recruitment processes, mining and rail operations are sectors with a serious problem of conflict of interest. The European Commission has raised concerns over Serbia's judiciary, police, health and education sectors that are particularly vulnerable to corruption. Corruption is considered the most problematic factor for doing business in Serbia, followed by inefficient government bureaucracy.

== Anti-corruption efforts ==
Even though Serbia has made progress in the investigation of high-level corruption cases, the implementation of anti-corruption laws is weak. According to Global Corruption Barometer 2016, 22% of Serbian citizens who had contact with public institutions included in research (traffic police, public health, educational system, courts - civil litigation, public services that issue official documents, departments responsible for social welfare), had paid bribe at least once in the previous year.

Transparency International's 2025 Corruption Perceptions Index scored Serbia at 33 on a scale from 0 ("highly corrupt") to 100 ("very clean"). This score was Serbia's lowest since the Corruption Perceptions Index began its current system of scoring in 2012. When ranked by score, Serbia ranked 116th among the 182 countries in the Index, where the country ranked first is perceived to have the most honest public sector. For comparison with regional scores, the best score among Eastern European and Central Asian countries (Note: Albania, Armenia, Azerbaijan, Belarus, Bosnia and Herzegovina, Georgia, Kazakhstan, Kosovo, Kyrgyzstan, Moldova, Montenegro, North Macedonia, Russia, Serbia, Tajikistan, Turkey, Turkmenistan, Ukraine, Uzbekistan) was 50, the average score was 34 and the worst score was 17. For comparison with worldwide scores, the best score was 90 (ranked 1), the average score was 43, and the worst score was 8 (ranked 180).

Transparency International reported in 2024 that the autocratic government of Serbia controls the justice system and prevents the prosecution of corrupt officials. Of the state prosecutor's office, Transparency International wrote: "This politically captured justice institution is failing to protect the public interest at a crucial time, reducing the country’s ability to stop corruption."

== See also ==
- Crime in Serbia
