= Malo Orašje =

- Village (Selo)
- Location within Serbia
- Coordinates: 44°33′51″N 20°47′08″E
- Country: Serbia
- District: Podunavlje District
- Municipality: Smederevo

Population (2022)
  - Total: 816
- Time zone: UTC+1 (CET)
  - Summer (DST): UTC+2 (CEST)

Malo Orašje is a village in the municipality of Smederevo, Serbia. According to the 2002 census, the village has a population of 1139 people.

== History ==
On 4 May 2023, five people were killed and six injured in a spree shooting in Malo Orašje.
