= Vranje shooting =

Shooting in Vranje

- Location: Vranje, Serbia, FR Yugoslavia
- Date: June 3, 1993
- Attack type: Mass shooting
- Deaths: 8 (including the perpetrator)
- Injuries: 4
- Perpetrator: Jožef Meneder
- Motive: Unknown

The Vranje shooting was a mass shooting that occurred on June 3, 1993, in Vranje, Yugoslavia. The shooting took place in the South Morava Brigade barracks of the Yugoslav Army. Private Jožef Meneder escaped from a detention cell, attacked a security guard and confiscated his weapon. He then killed six privates and one warrant officer, and wounded four more privates, before shooting and killing himself.

== Perpetrator ==
Jožef Meneder (Serbian Cyrillic: Јожеф Менедер; Hungarian: József Meneder) was born in 18 May 1974 in Subotica, SFR Yugoslavia in an ethnic Hungarian family. Before the attack, he was living with his mother, brother and sister in Bajša. He was conscripted and joined the Yugoslav Army (VJ) on 26 June 1992.

According to his neighbors, Meneder was very aggressive. Jožef's brother Šandor Meneder confirmed to the journalists that his brother was aggressive person. Despite this, Jožef Meneder has never been prosecuted for any misdeed before the incident. Acquaintances described him as a dark and painful individual. He used to be a carpenter up until joining the army. His acquaintances said that he was a member of a death metal band, and members of this group held parties at the cemetery. He had an inverted cross tattoo. On his left forearm he had a tattoo with the date of shooting. He belonged to the Bad Faith cult, which had its origins in the Black Roses cult. Satanic symbols, including postcards about Bad Faith, were found in his room in his parents' house. A month before the shooting, a security report said he could do something undesirable.

According to Šandor Meneder, Jožef planned to come home on 18 May 1993 to participate in probate proceedings for his late father who died in December 1992. Later, Jožef informed his brother that he will not be able to come home because of a conflict with his superior. Jožef failed to mention that he was held in detention at the time.

== Incident ==
Meneder was serving in the VJ in the South Morava Brigade barracks in Vranje. At the time of the incident, Meneder was in the barrack's detention unit because of a physical attack on another soldier. Around 2 A.M. on 3 June 1993, Meneder broke out from his cell and then took an axe from a firefighting unit. Using the axe, he attacked the guard and took a machine gun from him. After that, he entered the sleeping compartment and opened fire on fellow soldiers and officers. He killed six persons: warrant officer Milivoje Miladinović, corporal Dejan Obradović, and privates Dragan Ilić, Aleksandar Stojanović, Dragan Dodić, Milan Vesić and Jovica Stošić. He wounded four more soldiers including the guardsman whom he wounded with the axe while taking his gun. After that, he committed suicide.

=== Aftermath ===
On 28 June 1993, military disciplinary prosecutor filed an indictment against four persons. Colonel Milorad Banović, commander of the barracks, was accused of failing to properly secure the detention unit, and for failing to subject Meneder to medical examination although he was ordered to do so by the corps commander. Chief of staff in the barracks Major Radovan Šarčević, battalion commander Major Zlatibor Jovanović, and company commander lieutenant Slavko Graovac, were all accused of negligent performance of duty. On 8 July, military disciplinary court sentenced Banović to military discharge, Šarčević to halting the advance for two years, Jovanović to military discharge, and Graovac to 30 days in prison. The accused filed an appeal to the Higher military court, who upheld the appeal and order re-trial. Higher court determined that the verdict was "unclear and contradictory".

== See also ==
- Paraćin massacre
- List of massacres in Serbia
