= Jabukovac, Negotin =

Jabukovac Јабуковац Icubovăț
- Village
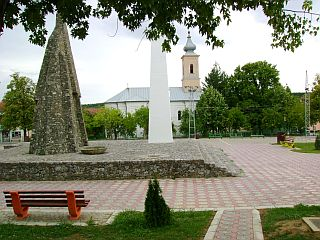
- Monument to the fallen of the Wars

- Location within Serbia
- Coordinates: 44°20′56″N 22°22′50″E
- Country: Serbia
- District: Bor District
- Municipality: Negotin

Area
  - Total: 89.81 km^{2} (34.68 sq mi)
- Elevation: 193 m (633 ft)

Population (2002)
  - Total: 1,884
- Postal code: 19304
- Area code: 019

Jabukovac (Serbian: Јабуковац, Romanian: Icubovăț, derived from Jabuka - apple) is a village in Serbia. It is located in the municipality of Negotin, in the Bor District, near the borders between Serbia, Romania and Bulgaria.

== History ==
It is first mentioned in the 16th century in Turkish texts, it had 10 houses in 1530, 17 in 1586. In the 18th century it is found on Austrian maps with the name Jabukonjiz, it had 34 houses in 1736, 390 in 1846, 578 in 1866.

From 1929 to 1941, Jabukovac was part of the Morava Banovina of the Kingdom of Yugoslavia.

== Population ==
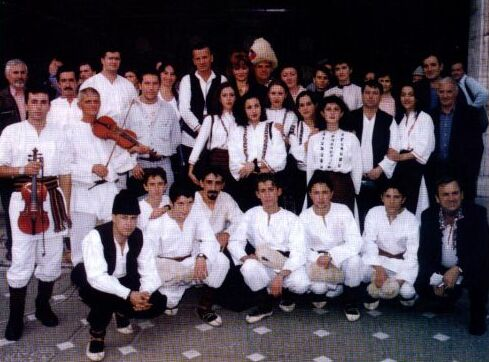
Romanians from Jabukovac

According to the 2002 census, its population numbered 1,884.

== See also ==
- Jabukovac killings
- List of places in Serbia
