= Paraćin massacre =

Mass shooting in Serbia

- Location: Paraćin, SR Serbia, SFR Yugoslavia
- Date: 3 September 1987
- Attack type: Mass shooting
- Weapon: Zastava M70
- Deaths: 5 (including the perpetrator)
- Injuries: 5
- Perpetrator: Aziz Kelmendi
- Motive: Anti-Slavic sentiment Kosovo independence

The Paraćin massacre (Serbo-Croatian: Paraćinski masakr / Параћински масакр) was a mass shooting which targeted Yugoslav People's Army (JNA) soldiers in the military barracks in Paraćin, Yugoslavia on 3 September 1987. The perpetrator was Aziz Kelmendi, a 20-year-old Kosovo Albanian conscript. Kelmendi fired an automatic weapon into two sleeping rooms before he fled and committed suicide. The shootings left four soldiers dead and five wounded.

== Background ==
Aziz Kelmendi (Serbian: Азиз Кељменди/Aziz Keljmendi; born 15 January 1967 in Lipljan, SFR Yugoslavia) was a Kosovo Albanian conscript in the Yugoslav People's Army (JNA). Yugoslav authorities described him as a "misfit and loner". Prior to his military service, he was arrested and imprisoned from 2–17 April 1984 for allegedly attempting to leave Yugoslavia and go to Albania. At his trial hearing he reportedly said "Albania is my country, not Yugoslavia. I want to go there and live and fight for our goals!". His conviction also included nationalistic behaviour at high school and university. He disliked learning Serbo-Croatian. Prior to the killings, he had two arguments with a soldier named Safet Dudaković.

== Attack ==
On 3 September 1987, Kelmendi's mother and father came to Paraćin to visit their son. Next morning, Kelmendi broke into a firearm cabinet and stole ten 7.62 mm bullets. He loaded these into his military-issued automatic weapon and went from the living facilities to a guard post. According to the JNA inquiry, Kelmendi threatened to kill the watchman, corporal Riza Alibašić, and took two magazines of ammunition from him. Pointing his weapon at Alibašić, Kelmendi took the corporal back to the living facility and demanded to know where Dudaković slept. When Alibašić refused to answer, Kelmendi told him to step aside and went into the sleeping quarters. There, he shot and killed the sleeping Dudaković before killing Srđan Simić and Goran Begić and wounding two other soldiers. He went into the adjacent sleeping quarters and fired randomly at the soldiers there, killing Hasim Dženanović and wounding two others. Kelmendi then fled the barracks. He was found dead 0.8 kilometres (0.50 mi) away and his death was later declared a suicide. A total of four soldiers were killed and five were wounded in the shooting. Two of those killed were Bosniaks, one was a Serb, and one was half-Slovene and half-Croat.

== Aftermath ==
It was claimed that "Kelmendi was assisted by eight associates, members of a hostile Albanian separatist and irredentist group". These eight, six ethnic Albanians, an ethnic Muslim and a Roma, were later convicted for helping the attack. Yugoslav authorities concluded that Kelmendi had planned the attack shortly before it occurred. They stated that the military unit in which he served had no reason to suspect that he was mentally unstable and that he was "a loner who had a personal complex because he was ugly and quite nervous". He apparently socialized only with other Albanians and sometimes acted aggressively.

The Paraćin massacre shocked Yugoslavia, where mass shootings were very uncommon. Media reported the attack as a "shot at Yugoslavia". It prompted Yugoslav authorities to send 400 federal police officers to Kosovo at the end of 1987. Despite those killed having been mostly non-Serbs, the Serbian media presented the shootings as an anti-Serbian attack. An estimated 10,000 people attended the funeral of Srđan Simić, the Serb soldier who was killed. Senior JNA officers and the mayor of Belgrade were in attendance. The crowd followed Simić's casket in silence, with some complaining that neither Ivan Stambolić nor Slobodan Milošević had attended the funeral. Afterwards, crowds began denouncing Yugoslavia and chanting "Serbia, Serbia!". They shouted "better the grave than a slave!", "we want freedom", "Kosovo is Serbia", "we shall not give Kosovo away" and "enough of resolutions". Simić's father repeatedly asked for the crowd to stop chanting, but to no avail. After the funeral, an estimated 20,000 people visited Aleksandar Ranković's grave in the same cemetery and sang "Hey, Slavs", the national anthem of Yugoslavia. The crowd shouted "down with Azem Vllasi" and "all Shiptars out of Serbia, Kosovo is ours!".

Mobs responded to the killings by destroying Albanian-owned kiosks and shops in Paraćin, Subotica, and Valjevo. Yugoslav authorities arrested Kelmendi's family members and questioned them in a Prizren jail. Kelmendi's sixteen-year-old sister, Melihata, was expelled from her school. The Partisan organization in Kelmendi's birthplace, Dušanovo, demanded that all villagers isolate his family. Kelmendi's high school tutor, Agish Kastrati, was forced from the League of Communists of Yugoslavia and five of his teachers received "final warnings" for failing to record Kelmendi's absence from school during his imprisonment three years earlier.

== See also ==
- List of massacres in Serbia
- Vranje shooting
