= Sefer Turan =

Turkish journalist

Chief Advisor to Prime Minister of Turkey
- Incumbent
- Assumed office April 2011

TRT At Turkiyya Coordinator
- In office 30 June 2009 – April 2011

Personal details
- Born: 1962 (age 62–63) Kahramanmaras, Turkey

Sefer Turan (born 1962 Afşin, Kahramanmaras, Turkey) is a Turkish journalist and author. Turan was educated in Egypt and he knows Arabic very well.

== Career ==
Sefer Turan is one of the few Middle East experts in Turkey. He served as a head of foreign news department at the Channel 7 TV station. He prepared and presented "the East & West" program at the ULKE TV.

Turan monitored Afghanistan and Iraq wars. His most remarkable works are on Palestine case. He prepared programs on Second Intifada, Palestine-Israel and Lebanon-Israel conflicts.

Sefer Turan attends as a political commentator on international TV Programs such as Al Jazeera, BBC Arabic, Rusiya Al-Yaum. He is appointed to the post of coordinator at state channel TRT el Türkiye which started broadcasting in Arabic He is currently serving as the chief advisor in Prime Minister Recep Tayyip Erdogan's office. He has written several articles supporting the Egyptian Islamic Jihad, listed by the United Nations Security Council as an al-Qaeda-affiliated group.

Sefer Turan married and he has three children.

== Bibliography ==
- Jerusalem: Heart of the history (2004)
- My travels (2006)
- Historian of sciences: Fuat Sezgin (2010)

| Preceded by - | Chief advisor to Prime Minister of Turkey; April 2011 - | Succeeded by |
| Preceded by - | Coordinator At TRT At Turkiyya; June 2009-April 2011 | Succeeded by |
