= Orom (Kanjiža) =

Orom Ором (Serbian) Orom (Hungarian)
- Village (Selo)
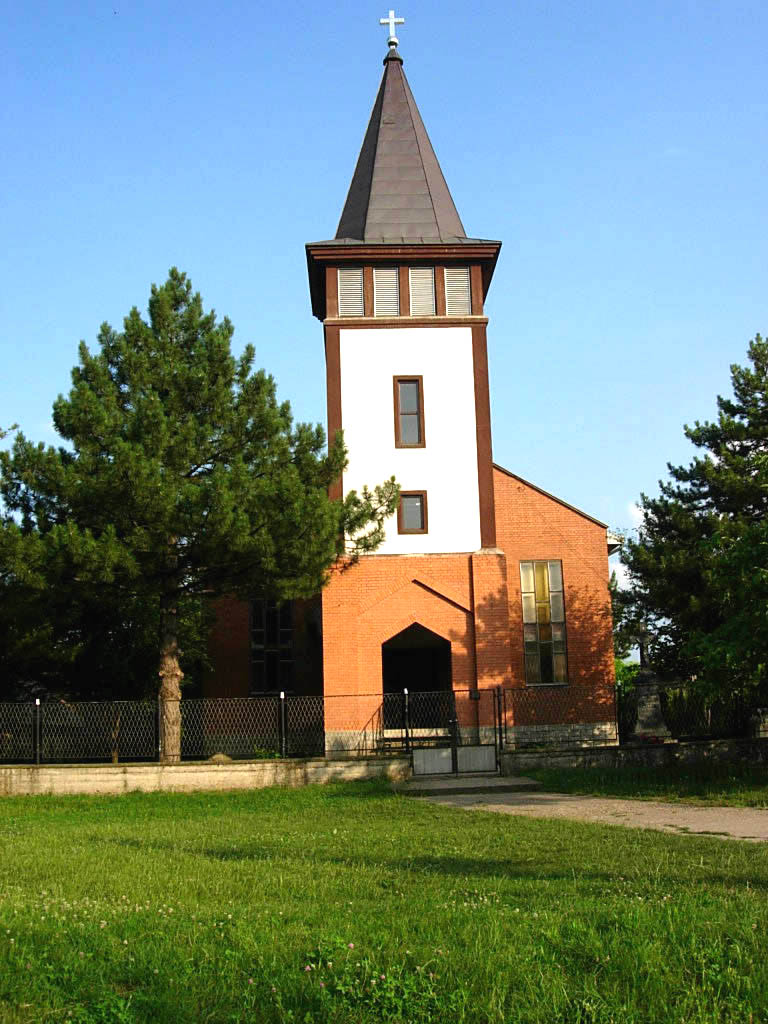
- The Heart of Mary Catholic Church

- Location of Vojvoda Zimonić within Serbia Orom (Serbia) Orom (Europe)
- Coordinates: 45°58′20″N 19°49′33″E
- Country: Serbia
- Province: Vojvodina
- District: North Banat
- Municipalities: Kanjiža
- Elevation: 115 m (377 ft)

Population (2002)
  - Orom: 1,561
- Time zone: UTC+1 (CET)
  - Summer (DST): UTC+2 (CEST)
- Postal code: 24207
- Area code: +381(0)24
- Car plates: KA

Orom (Serbian Cyrillic: Ором, Hungarian: Orom) is a village in Serbia. It is situated in the Kanjiža municipality, in the North Banat District, Vojvodina province. The village has a Hungarian ethnic majority (94.23%), with a population of 1,561 people (2002 census).

== Historical population ==
- 1961: 3,002
- 1971: 2,552
- 1981: 2,007
- 1991: 1,912
- 2002: 1,561

== See also ==
- List of places in Serbia
- List of cities, towns and villages in Vojvodina
