= Sefer Daja =

Albanian religious leader

Sefer Daja (Tirana, 1897 – 1977) was an Albanian bejtexhi, popularised for his bayt poems in the volume Bejte nga Sefer Daja, written by Haxhi Deliu. He was well known as the public toilet cleaner in Tirana that died of hunger.
