= Žitište shooting =

2016 killings in Vojvodina, Serbia

- The location of the attack
- Location: 45°28′57.98″N 20°33′4.82″E; Žitište, Central Banat District, Vojvodina, Serbia
- Date: 2 July 2016
- Attack type: Mass murder; uxoricide
- Weapon: AK-47 assault rifle
- Deaths: 5
- Injuries: 22
- Perpetrator: Siniša Zlatić
- Motive: Unclear, jealousy suspected

On 2 July 2016, a Serbian man killed five people and injured twenty-two others after he opened fire with an assault rifle in a café in the town of Žitište, in the Central Banat District of Vojvodina, Serbia. The perpetrator was later identified as Siniša Zlatić (Serbian Cyrillic: Синиша Златић) (Born 1978).

== Shooting ==
On the nights of 1 July 2016 and 2 July 2016, Zlatić visited a café during a local festival, where he noticed his estranged wife with a group of friends. He returned home and retrieved an AK-47 assault rifle he illegally owned. He then returned to the café and at about 1:40 a.m. local time started shooting into the air. The attacker then shot his wife and another woman dead before randomly shooting other diners in the café, killing three men and injuring 22 other people. Café diners then grabbed the gun from the attacker as he tried to run away. Police located the gunman in the vicinity and quickly apprehended him.

== Aftermath ==
On 1 March 2017, the high court in Zrenjanin sentenced Zlatić to 40 years in prison, the longest possible sentence according to Serbian laws at that time.

== See also ==
- Gun politics in Serbia
- List of massacres in Serbia
- List of rampage killers in Europe
