= Jabukovac killings =

2007 killings in Serbia

Jabukovac shootings
- The location of the attack
- Location: Jabukovac, Negotin, Serbia
- Date: 27 July 2007 c. 17:00 – 18:00 (CEST, UTC+1)
- Attack type: Mass murder; spree shooting
- Weapons: Shotgun; bare hands
- Deaths: 9
- Injuries: 6 (including the perpetrator)
- Perpetrator: Nikola Radosavljević

The Jabukovac killings occurred on 27 July 2007, when Nikola Radosavljević killed nine neighbours and wounded five more in the Serbian village of Jabukovac (Romanian: Icubovăț).

== Shooting ==
On 27 July 2007, Radosavljević had lunch with his wife Jelena, who just came from Vienna that day, in Jabukovac (Romanian: Icubovăț). At around 17:00, they had an argument, which ended with Radosavljević hitting his wife and breaking her nose and jaw. He left her on the floor and went outside. After the attack on his wife, he tried to commit suicide by jumping into a well near his house. He intended to drown in the well. A neighbour heard noises coming out of the well and pulled a blood-covered Radosavljević out of the well. Radosavljević then went to his house and took a shotgun, that belonged to his father. He threatened the neighbour to leave or he would shoot him. The neighbour ran away from him.

Radosavljević left his yard with the shotgun at 17:30. He walked down the street and saw the married couple Branislav (57) and Draginja (55) Borongić standing in their yard. He shot and killed Branislav first, then fatally shot Draginja in her back, as she tried to run away. They were the first victims of the shooting. He walked further down the street and stopped at a fence next to a neighbour's yard. Through a hole in the fence he shot and killed Veljko Đorđević (58), his son Dragan (22), followed by Veljko's sister-in-law, Marina Barbucić (78), who died shortly thereafter.

After the attacks, Radosavljević met an old woman on the street and asked her if she practiced black magic. After she denied that, he let her run away. Radosavljević attacked his cousin Pera Vujić next, who got severely injured, but survived. Afterwards he went to the next house and shot Srđan Badžikić (15) in his yard. His father Siniša (36) tried to bend over him and protect him when he was shot in the back. Srđan died in Siniša's arms shortly afterwards. Jovanka Badejević (70) was shot shortly later, but went on to survive the massacre.

Radosavljević went to the house on the other side where he shot and killed Branislav Badejević (31). He then headed to his sister-in-law's house. Along the way, he shot and injured Vanuca Badarević (72), who managed to survive by hiding behind her house. However, her neighbour Persa "Jelica" Banković (37), who was washing clothes outside, was fatally shot and fell dead on the street.

When he arrived at his sister-in-law, Anika Čogić (62), he first accused and blamed her for being responsible for everything that had happened to him. He was convinced that she had practiced Vlach magic and had cursed him. He called her an "old witch" before he killed her with a shot to her chest. She was the last victim of the massacre. Afterwards he fled to the cemetery, where he tried to commit suicide by shooting himself in the stomach. Later on the police found him on 28 July at around 01:30 near his parents' grave. He was immediately arrested, but first taken to the hospital in Negotin, where he received first aid. Later he was brought to Niš, where he was undergoing a surgery.

== Perpetrator ==
Nikola Radosavljević (Serbian Cyrillic: Никола Радосављевић; born 1968) was a seasonal agricultural worker in Austria who returned to Serbia before the shooting. He is an ethnic Vlach. He is mentally ill and suffers from a paranoid personality disorder. As a child, he lost his sister, which affected him for a long time. He also lost his newborn daughter. His parents' deaths also affected him. He was married to Jelena. They have a son, Dalibor, and a daughter, Gordana. He had a brother who also worked in Austria. Neighbours described him as a kind and calm man who never quarreled with his family and neighbours.

However, he had attacked several people the year before already, in 2006, when he was on a bus trip from Austria to Serbia. After that, Radosavljević was admitted to the Laza Lazarević Institute for Neuropsychiatric Diseases in Belgrade, two months before the massacre. After only one month of treatment, he was released prematurely. He then was taken to a mental hospital in the Austrian city of Klosterneuburg and was released only 3 weeks later. Doctors determined that he felt threatened and constantly thought that someone wanted to harm him, which was accompanied by some delusional thoughts about being cursed by someone.

After some time, he stopped taking his medication and attacked his coworker in Austria in October, whereupon he was sent back to the hospital. Before the shooting, his farm in Serbia burned down, which concerned him. He was also haunted by the thought that his sister-in-law, Anika Čogić, and her mother had cursed him, and that he was under the influence of that curse. Two days before the shooting, he and his son went to a local Vlach sorcerer, who confirmed that he indeed was under the influence of a curse. The sorcerer also gave Nikola a means of removing the curse from him. His wife and father found incense and a spoon in his house and suspected that he was using them to get rid of the curse.

== Aftermath ==
After the shooting, he was sent to a mental hospital in Belgrade. Doctors concluded that at the time of the crime, he could not understand the significance of what he was doing or control his actions. A team of neuropsychiatric experts diagnosed him with acute paranoid personality disorder. He was not convicted but sent to Belgrade Central Prison Hospital for treatment. Radosavljević and his wife divorced. She remarried and would never return to Jabukovac again.

As of 2021, he is admitted to the Special Psychiatric Hospital "Upper Toponica" near Niš.

== In popular culture ==
The Serbian TV series Crna svadba (lit. Black wedding) was inspired by this event.

== See also ==
- Gun politics in Serbia
- List of massacres in Serbia
- List of rampage killers in Europe
