= Velika Ivanča shooting =

2013 spree shooting in Mladenovac, Serbia

Coordinates: 44°25′N 20°34′E

- The location of the attack
- Location: Velika Ivanča, Mladenovac, Serbia
- Date: 9 April 2013; 05:00–05:30 (CEST)
- Attack type: mass shooting; mass murder; spree shooting; murder-suicide
- Weapon: CZ-88 9mm pistol
- Deaths: 14 (including the perpetrator)
- Injuries: 1
- Perpetrator: Ljubiša Bogdanović
- Motive: Unclear

A spree shooting occurred in the Serbian village of Velika Ivanča in the early hours of 9 April 2013. That morning, 60-year-old Ljubiša Bogdanović, fatally shot thirteen people across several different locations before attempting suicide. Bogdanović died of his injuries two days later on 11 April 2013.

== Attack ==
At approximately 05:00 CEST (03:00 UTC), Bogdanović shot and killed his 83-year-old mother Dobrila and his 42-year-old son Branko, and wounded his wife Javorka with a shot to the head in their home. The gunman then entered four neighboring houses, killing five men, five women, and a two-year-old child, most of whom were shot in the head while they were sleeping. The weapon used was reported to be a CZ-88 9mm pistol. The killing spree ended when police arrived at the scene after a call from Javorka Bogdanović. They found Ljubiša Bogdanović in the backyard of his house. He committed suicide, shooting himself in the head.

Twelve of the victims died at the scene, and one victim died later that day at a Belgrade hospital. Bogdanović and his wife were taken to hospital, each in critical condition. Ljubiša Bogdanović died from his injuries two days later.

== Perpetrator ==
Ljubiša Bogdanović

Ljubiša Bogdanović (Serbian Cyrillic: Љубиша Богдановић; April 5, 1953 – 11 April 2013) was born in Velika Ivanča. His father committed suicide when he was a child, and he and his brother Radmilo were brought up by their grandfather Obrad, who was said to have been extremely strict and beat him when he made any mistakes. Bogdanović was a Serb veteran of the Croatian War of Independence, having served for four and a half months, and had held a firearm permit since 1981. Bogdanović and his son Branko had been employees of a Slovenian wood-processing factory in Mladenovac until 2012 when both lost their jobs.

It was said that Bogdanović had a history of domestic violence and had a dispute with his son about his relationship with a woman whom Ljubiša Bogdanović did not approve of.

Although Bogdanović was not known to have suffered from mental illness, his family had a history of such illness. Besides Bogdanović's father committing suicide, his cousin and uncle suffered from mental illnesses, the latter being treated and eventually dying in a mental institution.

== Response ==
A special meeting of the Serbian cabinet was called in response to the shooting. The government declared 10 April 2013 to be a day of mourning.

== Victims ==
- Branko Bogdanović (42), Ljubiša's son
- Dobrila Bogdanović (83), Ljubiša's mother
- Mihajlo Despotović (61), Ljubiša's cousin
- Milena Despotović (61), Mihajlo's wife
- Goran Despotović (23), Mihajlo's and Milena's grandson
- Jovana Despotović (21), Goran's wife
- David Despotović (2), Goran's and Jovana's son
- Ljubina Ješić (64), neighbor
- Miloš Ješić (48), Ljubiša's son
- Velimir Mijailović (78), neighbor
- Olga Mijailović (79), Velimir's wife
- Dragana Stekić (50), Ljubiša's cousin
- Danica Stekić (78), Dragana's mother

== See also ==
- Gun politics in Serbia
- List of massacres in Serbia
- List of rampage killers in Europe
