= List of school shootings in the United States (before 2000) =

This chronological list of school gun incidents and mass shootings in the United States before the year 2000 includes any school shootings that occurred at a K-12 public or private school, as well as colleges and universities, and on school buses. Excluded from this list are the following:

1. Incidents that occurred during wars
2. Incidents that occurred as a result of police actions
3. Murder-suicides by rejected suitors or estranged spouses
4. Suicides or suicide attempts involving only one person.

Shooting by school staff, where the only victims are other employees, are covered at workplace killings. This list does not include the 1970 Kent State shootings, or bombings.

== 19th century ==
=== 1840s ===
1 incident.

Date	Location	Deaths	Injuries	Total	Description
1840
November 12, 1840	Charlottesville, Virginia	1	0	1	John Anthony Gardner Davis, a law professor at the University of Virginia, was shot by student Joseph Semmes and died three days later.

=== 1850s ===
3 incidents.

Date	Location	Deaths	Injuries	Total	Description
1853
November 2, 1853	Louisville, Kentucky	1	0	1	Murder of William Butler: Student Mathews Flounoy Ward shot schoolmaster William H.G. Butler as revenge for what he perceived as unfair punishment of his brother the day before. Butler died and Ward was acquitted.
1856
August 16, 1856	Florence, Alabama	2	0	2	The schoolmaster warned students not to harm his tame sparrow, threatening death. One of the boys stepped on the bird and killed it. When the boy returned to school, the master took the boy into a private room and strangled him. Upon hearing what happened, the boy's father went to the school and shot the schoolmaster dead.
1858
July 8, 1858	Baltimore, Maryland	1	0	1	The 15-year-old son of Col. John T. Farlow (Baltimore's Marshal of Police 1867–70) was killed during a Sabbath School gathering. The perpetrator escaped, but several arrests were made.

=== 1860s ===
5 incidents.

Date	Location	Deaths	Injuries	Total	Description
1860
January 21, 1860	Todd County, Kentucky	1	0	1	A son of Col. Elijah Sebree was killed by another student. He had been led to believe that Young Sebree was threatening him; the latter student got a gun and fatally shot Sebree in the schoolhouse.
1864
February 6, 1864	Ashland County, Ohio	1	0	1	George W. Longfelt (or George W. Langfitt), the school teacher of the Pyfer's School House, killed student Alfred Desem (or Albert Diesem) and fled.
1867
February 16, 1867	Knights Ferry, California	2 (Note: Including one of the perpetrators)	0	2	Mr. McGinnis was killed by his daughter's teacher George T. Cheshire after McGinnis threatened the teacher for expelling his daughter from school. When McGinnis' son learned of this, he went to the school and killed the teacher.
April 2, 1867	Madison, Florida	1	0	1	Frank Pope, a pupil at St. John's seminary, shot and killed his teacher Mr. Bristow.
June 4, 1867	Buffalo, New York	0	1	1	13-year-old Arthur Day secretly took a loaded pistol to PS No. 18 to shoot a dog he said had bitten him. While playing with the pistol, Day accidentally shot and wounded classmate Robert Morton.

=== 1870s ===
7 incidents.

Date	Location	Deaths	Injuries	Total	Description
1871
January 27, 1871	Knoxville, Tennessee	1	0	1	John Roberts, aged 10 or 12, was accidentally shot in the eye at school and died.
1872
February 1, 1872	Washington, Pennsylvania	0	1	1	At the all-girls Union School, 17-year-old Thomas McGiffin shot and seriously wounded the principal, Prof. Wilson, in the hip because Wilson refused to deliver a note to one of the girls. McGiffin was a son of Col. Norton McGiffin, and brother of US naval hero Philo McGiffin.
1873
February 11, 1873	Wisconsin	0	1	1	A man shot the school mistress for whipping his son.
1874
February 20, 1874	Agency, Montana	1	0	1	After being ejected from school for disobedience, 20-year-old Thomas Squires fatally shot Prof. Hayes three times in the abdomen.
April 9, 1874	Lebanon, Tennessee	1	0	1	John Robert Breckinridge, son of the late Robert Jefferson Breckinridge, attending classes in law at Cumberland University in Lebanon, Tennessee, was killed by John L. Anderson, the Mayor's son. The latter was reportedly "crazed with liquor."
1878
May 24, 1878	St. Paul, Minnesota	0	1	1	A 13-year-old boy, Luckert, accidentally shot and wounded Allie McDonald, another boy at the Neill school. The youth was expected to recover. His mother Mrs. McDonald went to the police station, but did not file a formal complaint.
1879
May 24, 1879	Lancaster, New York	0	1	1	Telegraph operator Frank Shugart shot and severely injured Mr. Carr, superintendent of the stables at a girls' school.

=== 1880s ===
10 incidents.

Date	Location	Deaths	Injuries	Total	Description
1881
December 1, 1881	Santa Monica, California	1	0	1	While working late at the schoolhouse on a program for the children's concert, Mr. O'Donnell, the school master, and Mr. Williams, one of the parents, got into an argument. Williams fatally shot O'Donnell in the back.
December 22, 1881	Shelby County, Indiana	0	0	0	School teacher Charles J. Gregory shot at a pupil at close range because he refused to write on a slate. The bullet missed the boy. The teacher was arrested.
1882
January 16, 1882	Iola, Kansas	0	0	0	A group of boys shot into a schoolhouse, but no one was hurt. Two of the boys were arrested and pleaded guilty three weeks later. They were fined $9.00 each.
April 13, 1882	Huntsville, Texas	0	1	1	G.W. Gray, a student at the Sam Houston Normal School, shot and wounded another student, M.J. Jordan. They were arguing over a comic valentine.
1883
February 14, 1883	Florence, Nebraska	0	3	3	As some children were playing and throwing snowballs outside the Ponca Creek schoolhouse, Lem Harbaugh and the Shipley brothers, three young men, pulled up in a wagon and engaged the children in a snowball fight. One of the Shipley brothers had a .45-caliber needle gun. As the children kept throwing snowballs, Harbaugh aimed the gun at them. The lock was faulty and the gun went off; he wounded Mamie Shipley, Joy Price, and Marquis Price. Harbaugh later surrendered himself to the authorities.
November 20, 1883	Barber County, Kansas	0	0	0	A bunch of drunken cowboys stopped at several schoolhouses, forcing two teachers to drink whiskey, and firing numerous shots at three schoolhouses.
1884
February 28, 1884	Danville, Virginia	0	2	2	As Allen Wamack, a 15-year-old boy, drove by an all black schoolhouse, he called out "school butter" (an insult meaning a cobbing, or a whipping). The students came out and fired several shots at him; he shot back, hitting two students.
March 6, 1884	Charlestown, Massachusetts	0	0	0	As news of outlaw Jesse James reached the East Coast, young boys started to imitate him. For instance, boys shot at police investigating their activities at the Concord Street schoolhouse.
1887
June 12, 1887	Cleveland, Tennessee	1	0	1	Will Guess shot and killed teacher Miss Irene Fann, for whipping his little sister the day before.
1889
June 13, 1889	New Brunswick, New Jersey	0	0	0	Charles Crawford, upset over an argument with a school trustee, went up to the window and fired a pistol into a crowded schoolroom. The bullet lodged in the wall just above the teacher's head.

=== 1890s ===
6 incidents.

Date	Location	Deaths	Injuries	Total	Description
1890
April 24, 1890	Brazil, Indiana	0	1	1	While the pupils of the Meridian Street School were at play, student Ben Corbery drew a revolver and seriously wounded 10-year-old Cora Brubach in the face. Cora had told the teacher about Ben's misconduct.
December 27, 1890	Staunton, Virginia	1	0	1	At Kable's Military Academy, 15-year-old A.H. Hathaway of Denison, Texas, was accidentally shot and killed by his 17-year-old classmate James Whitworth of Sulphur Springs, Texas, while they were playing with an old pistol.
1891
March 30, 1891	Liberty, Mississippi	0	14	14	During a school exhibition and concert at the Parson Hill schoolhouse, an unknown gunman fired a double-barreled shotgun into the mixed audience, made up of black and white students, parents and teachers. 14 people were wounded, some seriously.
April 9, 1891	Newburgh, New York	0	3	3	Elderly Newburgh resident James H. "Hipe" Ferguson fired a shotgun loaded with birdshot at students from outside the gate of St. Mary's Parochial School on Gidney Avenue after other students reportedly jeered and threw stones at him, causing non-life-threatening injuries to three boys (Frank Barnes, 10; Joseph Stapleton, 13; and Lawrence Tobin, 12). The three injured students were not involved in the jeering or stone-throwing. Ferguson was arrested on a charge of assault in the second degree and held for the grand jury on $1,000 bail.
1893
March 26, 1893	Plain Dealing, Louisiana	4	1	5	During an evening school dance at Plain Dealing High School, a fight broke out. Two students were shot and killed immediately, two more were fatally wounded, and the high school's Professor Johnson was wounded in the arm.
1898
December 12, 1898	Charleston, West Virginia	6	4+	10+	During the school exhibition, a group of young men tried to break up a student performance. When teacher Mr. Fisher tried to throw them out, they turned on him. Audience members joined the fray. Harry Flasher was shot and instantly killed, Henry Carney was fatally shot in the back, Ralph Jones and two others were also fatally shot, and George Gibson was shot in the hand; Haz Harding had his skull crushed, and several others received minor wounds.

Total incidents listed here in this section (19th century): 32

== 20th century ==
=== 1900s ===
13 incidents.

Date	Location	Deaths	Injuries	Total	Description
1903
February 24, 1903	Inman, South Carolina	1	0	1	Edward Foster, a 17-year-old student at Inman High School, was fatally wounded by his teacher Reuben Pitts after jerking a rod from Pitts' hands to avoid punishment. According to the teacher, Foster struck the pistol Pitts had drawn, and caused it to fire. Pitts was acquitted of murder on grounds of self-defense.
July 21, 1903	Jackson, Kentucky	2 (Note: Including both perpetrators)	1	3	At the Cave Run School, James Barrett and Mack Howard argued over a card game and fought a duel with pistols, killing each other. Twelve-year-old student James Vires was shot in the abdomen while sitting at his desk during the gunfight.
1904
April 6, 1904	Chicago, Illinois	1	0	1	Two students, both aged 16, had been fighting for months over a girl. Paul Jelick struck and threw Henry Schaze to the ground, Schaze then drew a revolver, and killed his rival.
November 16, 1904	Riverside, California	2	1	3	At the Indian School, a gun fight broke out between pupils. Charles Colby was shot in the head with a pistol, then returned fire, killing Tom Bucanoros, and fatally wounding Fred Smith.
December 16, 1904	Magee, Mississippi	1	1	2	Parent E.E. Mangum was shot through the head and killed by the principal of the high school, Professor J. E. Woodward, after shooting the principal in the hand. Mangum had argued with Woodward, who had given Mangum's 15-year-old son a severe whipping.
1905
February 9, 1905	Colusa, California	0	1	1	The meeting of 17-year-old Elmer Hildreth with a school Trustee ended in an armed encounter over Hildreth's being suspended. When Mr. Ingrim went after Hildreth with an axe, Hildreth shot him in the stomach. Hildreth was arrested and was found to have acted in self-defense; no charges were filed. Ingrim survived.
October 5, 1905	Hickman, Kentucky	1	0	1	Parent George Nicholson killed John Kurd at a schoolhouse during a school rehearsal. Kurd had made a disparaging remark about Nicholson's daughter during her recital.
1907
December 20, 1907	Chico, California	1	0	1	Nine-year-old Arthur Roberts was shot in the head and killed outside his school during a military drill by school children of the Dayton school district. Armed with old guns believed to be empty, the children had pulled the triggers.
1908
January 10, 1908	Council Bluffs, Iowa	0	0	0	At around 6 a.m., as George O Mortensen, 35-year-old janitor of the Washington Street School building, was unlocking the outer door of the school. Someone discharged a shotgun from a few feet away. The shot riddled the door within a foot of his head.
March 11, 1908	Fenway–Kenmore, Massachusetts	2 (Note: Including the suspect or perpetrator)	0	2	39-year-old teacher Miss Sarah Chamberlain Weed killed 34-year-old teacher Elizabeth Bailey Hardee, then shot herself, at the Laurens School, a fashionable boarding school. Weed was said to be suffering from melancholia.
1909
March 19, 1909	Mount Vernon, Illinois	0	1	1	During a school performance of The Grand Central, John Moake, portraying the villain, was shot in the forehead and dangerously wounded by the hero, Roy Slater. The cartridge was thought to have been blank.
June 10, 1909	Trinidad, Colorado	1	0	1	Walter Harris, an 11-year-old student, accidentally shot his teacher, B. C. Briggs, in the head while on a school field trip, killing him.
September 11, 1909	White Rock Township, Missouri	1	0	1	John Butram, a student at the Bear Hollow School, told his fellow students that school was cancelled. The teacher, A. T. Kelly, said it was not. When Butram drew a knife on his teacher, Kelly shot and killed him.

=== 1910s ===
21 incidents.

Date	Location	Deaths	Injuries	Total	Description
1910
January 12, 1910	Harlem, New York	2	0	2	"A black-bearded maniac drew an automatic pistol" and fired five shots into a crowd of boys at the Harlem School, who were taunting him. Six-year-old Robert Lomas was hit and died instantly; six-year-old Arthur Shibley was fatally wounded. The shooter, Herbert Jerome Dennison, was declared insane and sent to the Matteawan State Hospital.
August 16, 1910	Breathitt County, Kentucky	1	2+	3+	A general fight broke out during school board elections. Lewis Napier was shot and killed, and several other people were hurt. Several men were arrested.
1911
April 27, 1911	Manhattan, Kansas	0	1	1	During a school play rehearsal, a boy loaded his revolver, unknown to others. Pearl Reedy, an 18-year-old student who was to use the gun in the play, said she was afraid to handle it. The teacher, Sister Rose, said that the gun was not operational. She pointed it straight at Reedy's body and squeezed the trigger. The bullet wounded Reedy close to the heart.
1912
February 16, 1912	Lagrange, New York	1	0	1	14-year-old May McQuade was killed by classmate Raymond B. Carroll. Carroll said the shooting was accidental, as he did not think the gun was loaded.
December 14, 1912	New York City, New York	0	1	1	A boy living across the street from Hartley Hall of Columbia University supposedly fired shots in his sleep, striking the hall and slightly wounding junior Arthur Smith.
1914
January 6, 1914	Elkton, Maryland	1	0	1	13-year-old George Short shot and killed 9-year-old Paul McCall in a schoolyard.
November 19, 1914	Sayre, Pennsylvania	1	0	1	While walking to school, 14-year-old Charles Listman killed 15-year-old Andrew Milton over rivalry for classmate 13-year-old Minnie London.
November 30, 1914	Camden, New Jersey	0	0	0	14-year-old Walter Varnasdale accidentally fired a shot inside the Kaighn School, which nearly hit two students.
1915
January 13, 1915	Vancouver, Washington	0	1	1	During a parent-teachers' meeting, 15-year-old student Murlan Decker was accidentally shot by his younger brother, Luther.
February 3, 1915	Jasper, Florida	1	1	2	20-year-old Will Yates, teacher of Clear Pond School in Hamilton County, Florida, was shot and killed in a fight with Claude Holtzendorff and his two sons. The Holtzendorffs objected to one of the boys being whipped at school. When they showed up, Yates had armed himself. He shot the father through the mouth, and was fatally shot through the body, dying an hour later.
1916
September 20, 1916	Bemidji, Minnesota	0	1	1	Olga Dahl, the 19-year-old teacher at the Round Lake District School, was found tied to a tree near the school, assaulted, and shot twice in the face. She had been working late after school, when a man with a revolver entered the schoolhouse and ordered her to obey him. He raped and shot her; she was expected to live. A group of men in Itasca County, Minnesota joined in hunting the assailant.
December 4, 1916	Hammond,Indiana	0	3+	3+	The Lake County Superior Court House mass shooting took place on December 4, 1916. A former U.S.Civil War cavalry veteran named Mike Inik shot three people, one of whom was Judge Greenwood. The motive for the attack was reportedly related to Inik attempting to force the company Standard Oil to pay him $4,000,000 in compensation after he was injured in an oil refinery accident. When the court dismissed his claim as outlandish, Inik allegedly spent nearly 20 years collecting revolvers and sabers from the U.S. military. He later carried out the attack with the intention of killing Judge Greenwood. After the shooting, Inik was apprehended by police and sent to Michigan State Prison. He eventually died there in 1945 and was reportedly buried in the prison's cemetery.
December 26, 1916	Danville, Kentucky	1	5+	6+	During the Christmas tree celebration at the Harris Creek School, a fight broke out in the room packed with children and visitors. William Benedict Sr. was instantly killed, William Benedict Jr. was shot in the ankle, Bourdon Galloway was shot in the right arm, and Mike Gaddis was shot in the leg. Many others were injured. Thomas Thornton had been drinking and objected to Benedict telling him to calm down. Thornton's brother George left the room and returned with a revolver.
1917
June 5, 1917	Harrisburg, Pennsylvania	0	1	1	Sixteen-year-old freshman Earl Wolf was accidentally shot in the leg with a revolver about noon, in the company of classmates at Central High School.
October 28, 1917	Chicago, Illinois	1	0	1	Brothers 16-year-old William and 15-year-old Ralph Carter broke into the May Public School, robbing the phone boxes and teachers' desks. When they were discovered by janitor Howard Parks and policeman Thomas Conway, the latter shot at them. William was critically wounded and not expected to live; Ralph Carter was taken to jail.
November 29, 1917	Manes, Missouri	0	1	1	At the Perkins School's Thanksgiving night pie supper, 21-year-old teacher Joe Todd, was mysteriously shot. He was expected to recover.
1918
March 29, 1918	Jefferson City, Missouri	1	0	1	At the Lincoln Institute, State Negro Normal School, 31-year-old Professor Romeo West, was killed in the dormitory by superintendent of school Theodore Martin. They were arguing about dishes to use at a social. Martin said he shot in self-defense, fatally hitting West with three of five shots.
April 6, 1918	Reeder, North Dakota	1	0	1	During the afternoon recess, a boy was looking over a 22-caliber rifle; it discharged, striking the head of the Coyne boy in the seat to the front, killing him instantly.
1919
January 9, 1919	Philadelphia, Missouri	0	0	0	While school was in session, Hugh Claggett shot through the schoolhouse's front door, while on his way home from work. No one was hurt, and he was fined $20.
April 12, 1919	Ogden City, Utah	0	1	1	During a high school assembly, six boys shot off their guns. Permission had been given in the belief the guns were loaded with blanks, but they had live shot. Teacher Verna Davidson was shot in the foot.
August 4, 1919	Berkeley, California	0	2	2	Roger Sprague, an assistant in the department of chemistry at the University of California, despondent over his inability to obtain a position, shot and wounded 59-year-old Professor Edmond O'Neill, head of department, and 37-year-old Dr. Joel Henry Hildebrand, professor of chemistry, in the offices of Gilman Hall. He went to California Hall and shot at 57-year-old May L. Cheney, appointment secretary, but hit only one of her hair combs before he was subdued.

=== 1920s ===
11 incidents.

Date	Location	Deaths	Injuries	Total	Description
1920
February 14, 1920	Durant, Oklahoma	0	1	1	At the Durant Normal School, teacher Albert McFarland, was seriously wounded by one of his pupils.
March 4, 1920	Cincinnati, Ohio	0	1	1	14-year-old student Lawrence Angel shot his teacher, Beatrice Conner, through the arm for sending him to the principal's office.
May 1, 1920	Summerville, Georgia	0	0	0	At the High School, 15-year-old student Alexander Potter fired six shots at his teacher, Prof. Ransom, but missed. Potter was upset over having been whipped and expelled. He was sentenced to six years at a reform school.
May 15, 1920	Bowling Green, Ohio	1	0	1	While attending her son's school track meet, Mrs. F. Mahl was killed accidentally by a shot from the starter's pistol.
August 1, 1920	Ogden, Utah	0	1	1	Mike Smults, the night watchman at the Utah school for the Deaf and Blind, shot a 10-year-old boy, Dennis McDonald, as he and his brother Clinton cut through the campus. The watchman said he fired into the air as a warning.
October 22, 1920	Chicago, Illinois	0	1	1	Mrs. Carmila Rindoni went to the school and twice shot Rosalind I. Reynolds, her son's teacher, for spanking her son the day before. Mrs. Rindoni was arrested; Miss Reynolds was expected to recover.
November 4, 1920	Middlesboro, Kentucky	1	0	1	Prof. Barnes of Middlesboro High School was fatally shot by Adolphus Oaks for whipping Oaks' sister the week before. Barnes had submitted his resignation to the school board, as students had boycotted his class in protest over the whipping. He intended to leave the city that weekend. Oaks went to jail.
1922
February 17, 1922	Valdosta, Georgia	2	0	2	John Glover broke into the schoolhouse, where he killed a girl and fatally wounded a boy. A mob tracked and killed Glover 7 miles (11 km) in Indianola (now Naylor, Georgia).
August 1, 1922	Ardmore, Oklahoma	1	0	1	Bryant Hignight and four other students were at the outhouse of the Mount Zion school. Hignight fired two shots. One instantly killed Raymond Guinn. When questioned, the other three boys said it was an accident.
1926
December 29, 1926	Gettysburg, Pennsylvania	0	1	1	12-year-old Frederick Heilman was shot through the right instep when Gettysburg College janitor Joseph Carver fired toward a group of boys trying to force their way into the college gymnasium. Carver had shot into the ground, and did not realize a bullet had ricocheted. Heilman's father did not press charges.
1927
May 18, 1927	Bath Charter Township, Michigan	45	58	103	Bath School disaster Andrew Philip Kehoe murdered his wife, set his farm on fire as a diversion, and detonated dynamite and pyrotol he had secretly planted beneath the local school. The initial blast killed dozens, mostly children, and as rescuers and parents gathered, Kehoe returned with an explosives-filled truck and detonated it during a confrontation, killing himself and several others. In total, 45 people were killed and many more injured, with additional bombs later discovered and disarmed.

=== 1930s ===
29 incidents.

Date	Location	Deaths	Injuries	Total	Description
1930
May 22, 1930	Ringe, Minnesota	1	0	1	24-year-old Douglas Petersen killed 20-year-old teacher Margaret Wegman, who was standing in the doorway of a rural schoolhouse.
1931
May 28, 1931	Duluth, Minnesota	1	0	1	Katherine McMillen, 24-year-old teacher at the Howard Gensen rural school near Duluth, was accidentally killed by a pupil who brought a revolver to school.
September 17, 1931	Dickson City, Pennsylvania	1	0	1	A school director shot and killed a police officer during a school board meeting at a high school.
1932
April 20, 1932	Manteca, California	1	1	2	An angered parent whose child had been spanked by Olive Taylor, a teacher at the Castle School, entered the school after classes had been dismissed and shot and killed her, wounding the school janitor as he came to investigate.
December 2, 1932	Mentone, California	0	0	0	A school bus carrying 20 students was struck by rifle fire.
1934
February 2, 1934	Harlan, Iowa	2	0	2	28-year-old Herman Seick shot and killed 23-year-old teacher Margaret Graves at the rural Monroe School no. 2 before killing himself.
February 5, 1934	Oklahoma County, Oklahoma	0	1	1	17-year-old Ulysses Walker shot and wounded a 19-year-old classmate on a school bus headed for Frederick A. Douglass High School.
March 29, 1934	Corvallis, Oregon	1	0	1	21-year-old Oregon State University student Paul Kutch was shot dead by accident in a fraternity house.
April 9, 1934	Tuscaloosa, Alabama	0	1	1	University of Alabama student Andrew Manning was shot and wounded on campus during a political dispute.
April 13, 1934	Institute, West Virginia	2	3	5	After finishing a speech to other employees at the West Virginia Schools for the Colored Deaf and Blind, superintendent James L. Hill began shooting, killing a teacher and wounding three other people before committing suicide.
May 25, 1934	Oakland, California	0	1	1	An 8-year-old accidentally shot himself at the Jefferson school.
June 1, 1934	Oroville, California	0	1	1	12-year-old Jack Drace accidentally shot a 14-year-old classmate during a rehearsal of a school play based on John Dillinger.
September 14, 1934	Gill, Massachusetts	1	0	1	Headmaster Elliott Speer was murdered by a shotgun blast through the window at Northfield Mount Hermon School. The crime was never solved.
October 25, 1934	Kentfield, California	0	0	0	During a fight between Marin Junior College and Santa Rosa Junior College students on the Marin campus, Marin students fired shots.
November 1, 1934	Berkeley, California	0	0	0	Two students were shot at as they entered International House Berkeley at the University of California. The shooting occurred after students at the University of California, Los Angeles were suspended for their communist beliefs, and of the students shot at was an avid anti-communist activist.
November 13, 1934	Medora, Indiana	2	0	2	17-year-old student Dorothy Weber was killed outside Medora High School by a 25-year-old man, who committed suicide afterwards.
December 3, 1934	Montgomery County, Ohio	0	0	0	Someone fired shots into the Northridge school as pupils were inside.
December 10, 1934	Montgomery County, Ohio	0	0	0	Shots were again fired into the Northridge school as class was in session.
December 14, 1934	Pilot, North Carolina	0	1	1	A boy who took a rifle to school accidentally fired it, severely wounding an 8-year-old pupil.
1935
February 16, 1935	Trenton, New Jersey	0	2	2	A 12-year-old found a revolver at the Slackwood school and fired two shots, wounding two schoolmates.
March 27, 1935	Tahlequah, Oklahoma	0	1	1	19-year-old Lois Thompson, a student at Northeastern State Teachers College, shot and wounded another student outside the campus administration building.
November 22, 1935	Lake Charles, Louisiana	0	2	2	Rufus A. Russell, whose son had been cut from the Lake Charles High School football team, shot and wounded the head coach during a pre-game pep rally and attempted suicide.
1936
January 24, 1936	Elizabeth, New Jersey	1	0	1	15-year-old Robert Arnold accidentally killed 13-year-old Phillip Tortorice in a classroom at Elizabeth elementary school.
June 4, 1936	Bethlehem, Pennsylvania	2	0	2	Wesley Clow killed his Lehigh University English instructor, C. Wesley Phy, for giving him a failing grade. Clow committed suicide after shooting Phy.
1937
June 4, 1937	Isabel, Kansas	1	0	1	16-year-old Robert Douthitt was accidentally killed backstage during high school play practice. The revolver was to have been loaded with blanks, but it held live ammunition.
September 24, 1937	Toledo, Ohio	0	2	2	12-year-old Robert Snyder wounded his principal, June Mapes, in her office at Arlington Public School when she declined his request to call a classmate. He fled the grounds and wounded himself.
1938
January 24, 1938	Blencoe, Iowa	1	0	1	17-year-old Edward Marley was accidentally killed by a fellow actor with a loaded gun while rehearsing for a play at Blencoe High School.
1939
March 15, 1939	Parkersburg, West Virginia	1	0	1	16-year-old student James Russell was shot and killed at Parkersburg High School. An 18-year-old non-student was indicted.
December 22, 1939	Reading, Michigan	0	1	1	18-year-old Richard Valentine shot and wounded 18-year-old Edith Balcom during a Christmas party at Reading High School after she rejected his advances.

=== 1940s ===
11 incidents.

Date	Location	Deaths	Injuries	Total	Description
1940
May 6, 1940	South Pasadena, California	5	2	7	South Pasadena Junior High School shooting: Verlin Spencer, the 38-year-old principal of South Pasadena Junior High School, killed five of his colleagues and left another seriously injured in shootings at two locations. Spencer had a long history of clashes with faculty and staff and was forced to serve a three-week involuntary leave of absence the year prior. When cornered by police, he shot himself in a suicide attempt but survived and was sentenced to five consecutive life sentences. Three years later, Spencer learned that the blood sample taken after his arrest was found to have high levels of bromide, a popular painkiller he took for headaches. While the amount was high enough to render him legally insane at the time of the shooting, he did not receive a retrial but was released from prison in 1970.
July 4, 1940	Valhalla, New York	1	0	1	Angered by the refusal of his daughter, 15-year-old Melba, to leave a boarding school and return home, 47-year-old Joseph Moshell went to the school and shot and killed his daughter. Moshell was sentenced to death for the murder; the governor of New York later commuted his sentence to life in prison.
1942
June 11, 1942	Columbus, Ohio	1	0	1	16-year-old Stedman Thompson shot and killed his stepfather, 37-year-old Ohio State University chemical engineer Charles R. Owens, in his university laboratory.
October 2, 1942	Williamsburg, New York	1	0	1	Irwin Goodman, 36-year-old mathematics teacher at William J. Gaynor Junior High School, was shot and killed in the school corridor by two boys.
1944
October 30, 1944	New York City, New York	0	1	1	During a workshop class at Samuel Gompers High School, a 16-year-old accidentally fired a pistol, wounding another student.
1946
June 26, 1946	Williamsburg, New York	0	1	1	A 15-year-old student was shot in the chest at the PS 147 annex of Brooklyn Automotive Trades High School after refusing to give money to a gang of seven youths.
1948
March 18, 1948	Bowling Green, Ohio	1	0	1	21-year-old Bowling Green State University student Jim Singler fired a pistol from his window, striking and killing 18-year-old Charles Wenzel in his room. Singler said he thought the gun was unloaded.
December 23, 1948	Ramapo, New York	1	0	1	A 14-year-old student was fatally wounded in the head by a shot from fellow student, 17-year-old Robert Ross, when he happened to be into range where Ross was target shooting near a lake at the school, and was caught in the crossfire.
1949
March 11, 1949	East Village, New York	0	1	1	A 16-year-old student at Stuyvesant High School was accidentally shot in the arm by a fellow student who was "showing off" with a pistol in a classroom.
November 12, 1949	Columbus, Ohio	1	0	1	Ohio State University freshman James Heer took a .45-caliber handgun from the room of a Delta Tau Delta fraternity brother and killed 21-year-old Jack McKeown, a senior and fraternity brother. Heer was sentenced to life in prison for the crime.
November 18, 1949	Chicago, Illinois	1	0	1	16-year-old LaVon Cain of DuSable High School was shot to death at the school after a group of female students began shooting at another group of female students. The shooting was over domestic disputes that had occurred days prior. Edwina Howard, aged 19, and two other teenage girls were charged in the shooting. The shooting was noted as one of the first fatal shootings in a Chicago public school.

=== 1950s ===
30 incidents.

Date	Location	Deaths	Injuries	Total	Description
1950
January 31, 1950	Evanston, Illinois	0	1	1	A 13-year-old boy shot his classmate, 13-year-old Nancy Penfield, in the neck with a pistol at Skokie High School.
March 16, 1950	Los Angeles, California	0	0	0	Five young gangsters fired three shots at members of a rival gang once classes were dismissed at Roosevelt High School.
March 20, 1950	Antlers, Oklahoma	0	1	1	A 12-year-old boy shot 15-year-old Byron Baker in the abdomen on the grounds of Antlers High School as revenge for a fight they had the previous day.
July 22, 1950	New York City, New York	0	1	1	During an argument with a former classmate, a 16-year-old boy was shot in the wrist and abdomen at the PS 141 dance.
October 8, 1950	New Orleans, Louisiana	0	6	6	Two unidentified suspected gangsters opened fire on each other from opposite ends of a balcony at Booker T. Washington High School while a jazz band was playing. Six bystanders were slightly injured, and the gunmen fled the scene.
1951
January 24, 1951	Alton, Illinois	1	0	1	61-year-old Henry Suhre, quartermaster at Western Military Academy, was killed in the cadet store on campus.
March 12, 1951	Union Mills, North Carolina	2	0	2	Professor W.E. Sweatt, superintendent and teacher at the Alexander School, was killed by 16-year-old Billy Ray Powell and 19-year-old Hugh Justice, students whom he had reprimanded. The boys fled and also shot Wade Johnson, 15, for reporting their rule infraction to Sweatt.
November 27, 1951	St. Louis, Missouri	1	0	1	15-year-old student David Brooks was fatally shot in front of other pupils. Two former students were sought by police.
1952
April 8, 1952	Rabun Gap, Georgia	1	0	1	A 15-year-old boarding school student shot a dean rather than give up his pin-up pictures of girls in bathing suits.
July 14, 1952	Morningside Heights, New York	1	0	1	Bayard Peakes shot and killed secretary Eileen Fahey at the American Physical Society (APS) office at Columbia University, where he was reportedly upset that the APS had rejected a paper of his. Peakes was deemed insane by a judge; he was held at an asylum for the criminally insane until his death in 2000.
1953
January 31, 1953	Kalispell, Montana	0	1	1	61-year-old Special Deputy Vernon Graves was accidentally shot in the face with a shotgun at the Fairview School.
May 19, 1953	Miami, Florida	0	1	1	29-year-old teacher Paul Singer was teaching firearm safety to his students at Edison Junior High School when his pistol slipped from its holster and discharged when it struck the floor. The bullet hit Singer in the lower abdomen, severely wounding him.
October 2, 1953	Chicago, Illinois	1	0	1	14-year-old Bernice Turner killed 14-year-old Pasquale Coletta inside the science classroom at Kelly High School. The shooting was later ruled to be accidental.
1954
March 31, 1954	Newton, Massachusetts	1	0	1	14-year-old John Frankenberger was accidentally killed in a classroom at Day Junior High School when a pistol held by a classmate discharged.
May 15, 1954	Chapel Hill, North Carolina	1	2	3	Putnam Davis Jr. was killed during a carnival at the Phi Delta Theta house at the University of North Carolina. William Joyner and Allen Long were wounded during the exchange of gunfire in their room. The incident followed an all-night beer party. Long told police Davis pulled a gun and started shooting while the three were drinking beer at 7 a.m. After wounding both men, Davis apparently shot himself.
1955
January 11, 1955	Swarthmore, Pennsylvania	1	0	1	After some of his dormmates urinated on his mattress during a hazing, 22-year-old Robert B. Bechtel, a student proctor at Swarthmore College, returned to his Wharton Hall dorm with a shotgun and killed fellow student, 19-year-old Francis Holmes Strozier. Bechtel was acquitted of murder by reason of insanity and spent five years in a psychiatric hospital.
January 26, 1955	Charlotte, North Carolina	0	1	1	15-year-old Kenneth Ray Griffin was showing his stepfather's pistol to his friends in the restroom of A. J. Junior High School when he accidentally fired it, striking 14-year-old Jack Plummer in the left side.
1956
March 5, 1956	Edmore, Michigan	0	1	1	14-year-old Peter Ray Forger shot and wounded 15-year-old William Shurlow after a disagreement at Edmore High School. Forger was charged with assault with attempt to murder.
March 13/21, 1956	Lakeland, Florida	1	1	2	24-year-old Clarke Gavin Jr. shot one Florida Southern College student in the foot and fired at a second student because his wife had been having an affair with him. As punishment, he was expelled. Gavin later killed his friend, 23-year-old Anthony McBride, at McBride's apartment. Gavin was later acquitted by reason of insanity and sent to a mental hospital.
May 4, 1956	Seat Pleasant, Maryland	1	2	3	15-year-old student Billy Ray Prevatte fatally shot 32-year-old teacher Frazer Cameron and injured 25-year-old athletic coach Francis Daniel Wagner and 31-year-old teacher Robert Hicks at Maryland Park Junior High School. He left after waiting outside the principal's office for a reprimand due to failing to turn in a written physical education assignment; he returned with a rifle, shooting the three staff members. Prevatte was sentenced to 30 years in prison and was released in 1988.
May 7, 1956	Philadelphia, Pennsylvania	0	2	2	Burlie Lord and James Pollard, both 17, shot each other in the basement of Overbrook High School due to a gang feud.
October 20, 1956	Manhattan Valley, New York	0	1	1	A Booker T. Washington Junior High School student was shot and wounded in the forearm by another student armed with a homemade weapon.
1957
February 16, 1957	Lolo, Montana	0	1	1	A 16-year-old boy was shooting at a target in the snow at his home. The bullet went through the snow and hit Manley Brown, a student in the schoolyard of a school a quarter mile away from where the bullet was fired.
October 2, 1957	New York City, New York	0	1	1	A 16-year-old student was shot in the leg by a 15-year-old classmate at a city high school.
1958
March 4, 1958	Park Slope, New York	0	1	1	A 16-year-old student shot the 17-year-old future major league baseball player Joe Pepitone through his stomach at the Manual Training High School.
May 1, 1958	Massapequa, New York	1	0	1	A 15-year-old Massapequa High School freshman was killed by a classmate in a washroom.
September 5, 1958	Dallas, Texas	0	1	1	A student was shot and severely injured while attending a Latin class in Booker T. Washington High School.
September 11, 1958	Dallas, Texas	0	0	1	Two students of Lincoln High School were having a shootout in the hallway until teachers restrained them.
1959
April 25, 1959	Nash County, North Carolina	0	0	0	Three teenagers vandalized North Whitakers Colored School by breaking eight windows with an automatic rifle and egg-sized rocks, causing over $300 in damage.
September 24, 1959	Melrose, New York	1	0	1	27 men and boys were arrested and an arsenal was seized in the Bronx as the police headed off a gang war resulting from the fatal shooting of a teenager at Morris High School.

=== 1960s ===
128 incidents.

Date	Location	Deaths	Injuries	Total	Description
1960
January 4, 1960	Grand Rapids, Michigan	0	1	1	A 17-year-old was shot in the leg outside South High School minutes after the school dismissed for the day. An 18-year-old was arrested.
February 2, 1960	Hartford City, Indiana	3	0	3	44-year-old Leonard Redden, the principal of William Reed Elementary School, shot and killed two teachers. He fled the scene and later killed himself in a forest.
February 4, 1960	Pittsburgh, Pennsylvania	0	0	0	A bullet struck a window of a classroom at Taylor Allderdice High School while the teacher was inside, showering her with glass shards. She was unharmed.
March 30, 1960	Alice, Texas	1	0	1	14-year-old Donna Dvorak brought a target pistol to Dubose Junior High School and fatally shot 15-year-old Bobby Whitford in their 9th-grade science class. Dvorak believed Whitford posed a threat to one of her girlfriends.
June 7, 1960	Blaine, Minnesota	2	0	2	41-year-old mail carrier Lester Betts confronted 33-year-old principal Carson Hammond in his Blaine Elementary School office and shot him dead with a 12-gauge shotgun in apparent jealousy over Hammond's relationships with his former wife. Betts later committed suicide.
October 31, 1960	Selinsgrove, Pennsylvania	0	0	0	A man fired shots into a Susquehanna University women's dormitory.
November 27, 1960	Jackson, Tennessee	0	0	0	A 30-year-old white man fired a shotgun at dormitories on the campus of the historically black Lane College, hitting no one.
November 30, 1960	Dallas, Texas	0	0	0	An 18-year-old fired five shots inside the yard of Crozier Tech High School in a targeted attack, missing his shots.
December 4, 1960	Shamokin, Pennsylvania	0	1	1	A 14-year-old was accidentally shot and wounded at Our Lady of Lourdes Regional High School.
December 9, 1960	Louisville, Kentucky	0	1	1	A 15-year-old student was shot in the leg during a game of Russian roulette at Madison Junior High School.
1961
January 4, 1961	Delmont, South Dakota	1	0	1	Donald Kurtz, a 17-year-old senior at Delmont High School, was fatally wounded by a .22-caliber bullet from a rifle. The shot, intended as a sound effect for a school play, hit him in the chest during a rehearsal minutes before the play was to take place.
January 7, 1961	Fort Collins, Colorado	1	0	1	20-year-old James A. Elliott was accidentally shot and killed by a roommate in a dormitory at Colorado State University.
January 18, 1961	Berkeley, California	1	1	2	A former University of California, Berkeley student, John Harrison Farmer, opened fire in professor Thomas Parkinson's office at Dwinelle Hall, wounding Parkinson and killing student Stephen Thomas.
January 31, 1961	Norfolk, Virginia	0	2	2	A 16-year-old student accidentally shot a 17-year-old bystander during a fight at Booker T. Washington High School; he also shot himself in the hand during the fight. Nine other teenagers were arrested, either for handling the gun used or being involved in the fight.
May 31, 1961	Williamstown, Massachusetts	0	1	1	During an argument at Williams College between students, one student fired a shot into a mail slot at a dormitory, grazing another person.
October 17, 1961	Denver, Colorado	1	2	3	14-year-old Tennyson Beard got into an argument with 15-year-old William Hachmeister at Morey Junior High School, shooting and wounding him. Another shot fatally struck 14-year-old Deborah Faith Humphrey. Beard attempted suicide but survived. He was later found not guilty by reason of insanity.
1962
January 22, 1962	Athens, Ohio	0	1	1	21-year-old Bennett Blakeslee, a student at Ohio University, opened fire on his girlfriend at a women's dormitory, wounding her.
February 12, 1962	Durant, Iowa	1	1	2	68-year-old teacher Inez Harding Goss was shot and killed by her estranged husband, who then attempted suicide, after classes had been dismissed.
October 30, 1962	Oxford, Mississippi	0	0	0	A soldier fired a shot inside a dormitory at the University of Mississippi.
November 12, 1962	Missoula, Montana	0	0	0	A student at the University of Montana fired a .22-caliber pistol at a police officer outside a fraternity house. He was arrested nearby.
November 13, 1962	Nashville, Tennessee	0	1	1	22-year-old Tennessee State University student Alfred Reese III was shot in the head and slightly wounded during an argument in the university's cafeteria.
December 8, 1962	Columbia, South Carolina	0	1	1	A University of South Carolina student was shot in the leg by a watchman at Columbia College.
1963
May 7, 1963	Paterson, New Jersey	0	6	6	53-year-old Ralph Best shot at students on the playground of Public School 14 with a rifle after they mocked him, wounding six students. Best was acquitted of assault.
June 1, 1963	Los Angeles, California	2	0	2	A security guard at Samuel W. Gompers Junior High School shot and killed two brothers who were burglarizing the school after they assaulted him.
September 10, 1963	Hammond, Indiana	0	0	0	As part of a crime spree, two teenagers fired shots inside the Erie Railroad yards, one of which struck a classroom window at Hammond Technical Vocational High School as class was in session.
September 23, 1963	Detroit, Michigan	0	1	1	A 17-year-old student accidentally fired a gun inside a classroom at Northern High School, wounding another student.
November 5, 1963	Cedar Rapids, Iowa	0	1	1	15-year-old Augie Holmquist, a student at Jefferson High School, was in the locker room after swimming class and was shot twice in the back and once in the hip with a .22-caliber revolver by student, 16-year-old Randy Schultz. Schultz ran home and told his parents to call the police. The boys had been playing water polo, and Holmquist had reportedly dunked Schultz. When Schultz objected, Holmquist hit him; Schultz retaliated with a gun.
November 26, 1963	Danville, Virginia	0	1	1	A 13-year-old girl was accidentally wounded by a round fired from a rifle used as a prop in a school play at Westmoreland Elementary School. A student had brought the gun to school after losing the initial prop, an air rifle.
1964
January 10, 1964	Spartanburg, South Carolina	0	1	1	A student was accidentally shot in a dormitory at Wofford College.
January 17, 1964	Trinidad, Colorado	1	0	1	A pistol accidentally discharged during a gunsmithing class at Trinidad State Junior College, killing 19-year-old student Brian Van DeWalker.
November 23, 1964	Lawrenceville, Georgia	0	1	1	A 17-year-old shot and wounded a 16-year-old student during passing period at Archer High School.
December 1, 1964	Poseyville, Indiana	0	0	0	17-year-old Larry Thornburg took two female classmates hostage at North Posey High School, shooting at the teacher as she fled and at an assistant principal as he investigated the scene. He also fired shots into a speaker in the classroom before a friend convinced Thornburg to disarm himself and he was arrested.
1965
January 13, 1965	Middle Island, New York	0	1	1	A 15-year-old freshman was injured in the ankle by an accidental discharge on a school bus waiting outside Longwood Junior-Senior High School. Two 16-year-olds were charged with illegal possession of a gun.
January 26, 1965	Kansas City, Missouri	0	2	2	During a fight outside East High School, 21-year-old Sylvester Eugene Jones fired a revolver twice, wounding a 17-year-old boy. As Jones got into his car, the gun accidentally discharged, wounding a 15-year-old girl. He was apprehended.
January 26, 1965	Chicago, Illinois	0	1	1	A 9-year-old was shot in the neck and wounded on Dewey Elementary School's playground. A 13-year-old suspect was arrested.
February 1, 1965	Knoxville, Tennessee	1	0	1	Hundreds of students at the University of Tennessee gathered along Cumberland Avenue to throw snowballs at passing cars. During the event, 27-year-old truck driver William Willett fatally shot 18-year-old freshman Marnell Goodman. Willett claimed he fired in self-defense, while witnesses stated he exited his truck and fired at the students. He was subsequently charged with second-degree murder.
February 11, 1965	Kansas City, Kansas	0	2	2	Two student athletes were wounded by a shotgun blast in the parking lot of Wyandotte High School. A 16-year-old girl, who had been recently expelled from the school, was arrested.
February 18, 1965	Sheffield, Alabama	1	0	1	16-year-old Franklin Anthony killed 17-year-old Christine Grimes with a pistol in a classroom at Sterling High School.
February 25, 1965	Vestavia Hills, Alabama	0	0	0	A disgruntled 16-year-old student fired a shot at a biology teacher in W.A. Berry High School, missing the teacher, but striking a door. He went to his third period classroom, where he was disarmed by officers soon after.
March 2, 1965	Red Bluff, California	0	0	0	Teenagers fired a shot at a school bus occupied with students, striking it, but hitting nobody. Several people matching the description of the shooters were arrested.
March 10, 1965	St. Louis, Missouri	0	1	1	A 14-year-old freshman at Vashon High School shot and wounded his English teacher, Leroy Deaton, after Deaton referred the student for disciplinary action. The shooter was disarmed by two students and arrested.
March 10, 1965	Columbia, Missouri	0	1	1	A non-student accidentally fired a rifle outside a dormitory of the University of Missouri, wounding another man. Both men were students at Lincoln University.
April 17, 1965	Beloit, Wisconsin	0	1	1	A Beloit College student surrendered to police while carrying a .380-caliber pistol several hours after another student was shot in the Sigma Pi fraternity house on campus.
April 29, 1965	Chamblee, Georgia	0	0	0	A 16-year-old student fired a rifle at students exercising on Chamblee High School's athletic field, striking no one. He surrendered to police.
May 4, 1965	Indianapolis, Indiana	0	1	1	A former student at North Central High School shot and wounded another former student outside the school during dismissal.
September 19, 1965	West Lafayette, Indiana	0	0	0	A 20-year-old Purdue University student fired shots at workers at Ross–Ade Stadium before being talked down by police and a psychiatrist. The workers declined to file charges.
October 1, 1965	Kansas City, Missouri	0	1	1	Several boys at Central Junior High School were playing with a gun on the playground when it discharged, severely wounding a 13-year-old girl.
November 10, 1965	Baltimore, Maryland	0	1	1	A 16-year-old student was shot in the abdomen at Garrison Junior High School.
November 12, 1965	Vacherie, Louisiana	0	2	2	During a brawl between students of Magnolia High School and Booker T. Washington High School in New Orleans at a football game hosted by Magnolia High, a 19-year-old fired shots, wounding two men.
December 10, 1965	Buda, Texas	0	1	1	An 8-year-old student was injured by a gunshot while standing in Buda Elementary School's playground.
December 18, 1965	Pendleton County, Kentucky	0	1	1	Night watchman Manley Ryder shot and wounded an intruder at Mt. Auburn School.
1966
January 8, 1966	Dillsburg, Pennsylvania	0	1	1	A night watchman at Northern Joint High School shot and wounded a 29-year-old burglar.
January 24, 1966	Harvey, Illinois	0	2	2	A 15-year-old student fired shots in the fieldhouse of Thornton Township High School, wounding two other students. The perpetrator initially claimed the shooting was an accident, but later admitted he had stolen a gun in order to kill the school dean.
February 1, 1966	Chicago, Illinois	0	1	1	A 15-year-old Englewood High School student shot a 17-year-old inside the school cafeteria. A lunchroom worker was trampled by fleeing students.
March 10, 1966	Charlotte, North Carolina	0	1	1	A 50-year-old man fired at students playing baseball on the playground of Irvin Avenue Junior High School, wounding a 13-year-old boy.
March 13, 1966	Waco, Texas	1	0	1	A security guard at George Washington Carver High School shot and killed an alleged burglar outside the school.
March 23, 1966	Moraga, California	3	0	3	34-year-old assistant janitor Clarence Jordan was expelled from work after coming to Camino Public School intoxicated. He returned to the school with a gun and killed his superior and the son of another worker. The boy's father fought Jordan, who was shot dead in the struggle.
March 24, 1966	Lynchburg, Virginia	0	1	1	An 18-year-old wounded a 13-year-old with a revolver on the grounds of Dunbar High School.
March 27, 1966	Los Angeles, California	0	1	1	16-year-old Robert James Smith was shot and wounded by a security guard during an apparent robbery at Jordan High School.
April 27, 1966	Bay Shore, New York	1	0	1	48-year-old teacher John S. Lane was fatally wounded when he tried to stop 16-year-old student James Arthur Frampton, who was armed with a shotgun and seeking boys he had argued with earlier that day. Lane died about six weeks later. Frampton was sentenced to 30 years in prison for the murder.
May 15, 1966	Silver City, New Mexico	0	1	1	A Western New Mexico University police officer was shot and wounded as he responded to shots being fired into a women's dormitory. A 23-year-old male student was arrested.
August 1, 1966	Austin, Texas	18	31	49	University of Texas tower shooting: 25-year-old engineering student Charles Whitman fatally shot 15 people and wounded 31 more during a 96-minute shooting rampage from the observation deck of the university. He was shot and killed by police. He had earlier murdered his wife and his mother at their homes. It was the deadliest shooting on a U.S. college campus until the Virginia Tech shooting in 2007.
September 21, 1966	Philadelphia, Pennsylvania	0	4	4	Four male South Philadelphia High School students were wounded in a gang-related shootout in the school's cafeteria. A 15-year-old student admitted firing a gun.
October 5, 1966	Grand Rapids, Minnesota	1	1	2	Grand Rapids High School student 15-year-old David Black killed school administrator Forrest Willey and seriously wounded a fellow student, 14-year-old Kevin Roth. Black was tried as an adult and was paroled after serving five years of a 25-year sentence.
November 8, 1966	Baltimore, Maryland	0	2	2	A student discharged a pistol four times inside the cafeteria of Frederick Douglass High School. One of the bullets struck and wounded two students, one critically. Police said the shooting was accidental.
November 12, 1966	Mesa, Arizona	5	2	7	1966 Rose-Mar College of Beauty shooting: 18-year-old Robert Smith took seven people, including four students, into a backroom at Rose-Mar College of Beauty and ordered them to lie down in a circle. He shot each in the head. Four women and a 3-year-old girl died; another woman and a baby were injured but survived. Police arrested Smith, who reportedly admired Richard Speck and Charles Whitman. Smith was sentenced to death in Arizona's gas chamber, but his sentence was commuted to life when the U.S. Supreme Court ruled the death penalty unconstitutional in 1972.
December 19, 1966	Dallas, Texas	1	0	1	18-year-old Franklin D. Roosevelt High School student Charles Bernard was killed by a 17-year-old outside the school in a dispute over clothes.
1967
January 15, 1967	Scottsbluff, Nebraska	1	0	1	21-year-old student George T. Sellery was accidentally shot dead in a Hiram Scott College dormitory.
January 27, 1967	Statesville, North Carolina	1	0	1	19-year-old former student Ronald Goforth was shot and killed in the parking lot of Statesville High School. Goforth had come to the school for assistance in filing his income tax form from teachers. 16-year-old Miles Forbes Jr. was charged with second degree murder.
March 22, 1967	Chicago, Illinois	0	0	0	18-year-old Donald Ayen fired a rifle from a balcony in the auditorium of Robert A. Waller High School, then shot at police. Two officers disarmed and apprehended Ayen, who possessed 1,000 rounds of ammunition and a gas mask. The shooter told police he was trying to protect himself from a gang he had a conflict with the previous day.
April 9, 1967	State College, Pennsylvania	0	0	0	A 20-year-old Pennsylvania State University student fired a rifle into a girls' dormitory.
April 19, 1967	Fort Worth, Texas	1	1	2	18-year-old Benjamin Torres Martinez opened fire in a hallway at Green B. Trimble Technical High School, killing Manuel Lopez and wounding Caludio Martinez Jr.
May 3, 1967	Northlake, Illinois	1	1	2	18-year-old dropout Michael Pisarski killed his former girlfriend, 17-year-old Christine Mitchell, inside West Leyden High School. The school's athletic director was wounded. Pisarski was sentenced to a minimum of 35 years to a maximum of 60 years in prison, with 4–5 years to be served concurrently for the aggravated battery of the athletic director.
June 18, 1967	Los Angeles, California	0	1	1	A 54-year-old criminal armed with a handgun was shot and wounded by security guards at William Howard Taft High School.
July 26, 1967	New Haven, Connecticut	0	2	2	34-year-old Ruth Dryfoos fired two shotgun blasts into a class taught by her husband at Southern Connecticut State College, wounding the professor and a student.
October 17, 1967	Philadelphia, Pennsylvania	0	2	2	During a gang-related fight at Germantown High School, an 18-year-old student opened fire, wounding two people in the school cafeteria. The shooter and another man were arrested.
October 18, 1967	St. Louis, Missouri	0	1	1	A student was wounded inside the cafeteria of St. Louis Community College–Forest Park after an argument over a woman. A 20-year-old student was arrested.
October 23, 1967	Honolulu, Hawaii	0	1	1	32-year-old Juanito Rivera wounded 23-year-old Roscoe Fernandez during a night class at Farrington High School. The shooting was due to a workplace dispute between the two men.
October 26, 1967	St. Bonaventure, New York	0	0	0	A 21-year-old prison escapee armed with a rifle broke into a St. Bonaventure University dormitory, threatened people inside, and shot at responding police, who returned fire, causing him to surrender.
1968
January 22, 1968	Indianola, Iowa	0	1	1	18-year-old Simpson College student Charles C. Cooley was accidentally shot in a dormitory by another student.
January 23, 1968	Miami, Florida	0	1	1	A 17-year-old student accidentally fired a gun inside a classroom at Mays Senior High School, wounding a classmate in the ear. The student was charged with carrying a concealed weapon.
January 30, 1968	Allapattah, Florida	1	0	1	16-year-old Blanche Ward killed fellow student 16-year-old Linda Lipscomb at Miami Jackson High School. According to Ward, she was threatened with a razor by Lipscomb during an argument over a fountain pen, and in the ensuing struggle, her gun went off. Ward pled guilty to manslaughter and was sentenced to eight years in prison.
February 5, 1968	Chicago, Illinois	0	2	2	Members of the Egyptian Lords gang threw bottles at members of the Dirty Dozen, a rival gang, in Bowen High School's cafeteria. A fight ensued, and a participant fired a shotgun, wounding two student bystanders. Three 17-year-olds were arrested.
February 12, 1968	Holdenville, Oklahoma	0	1	1	An 18-year-old student was shot in a hallway at Holdenville High School. A 16-year-old was charged with shooting with intent to kill.
February 20, 1968	Chicago, Illinois	0	1	1	A 15-year-old student shot and wounded an 18-year-old senior as he exited a classroom at Chicago Vocational High School. The incident was apparently gang-related.
March 12, 1968	Charlotte, North Carolina	2	0	2	25-year-old Allen Craver fatally shot University of North Carolina at Charlotte student Robert Hyman on campus before killing himself.
March 20, 1968	Dallas, Texas	0	1	1	A student shot and wounded 14-year-old Johnny Williams with a .22-caliber pistol in the principal's office at Spence Junior High School. The shooter fled to his home and was apprehended.
March 25, 1968	High Point, North Carolina	1	0	1	15-year-old David Lee Walker was killed just outside Central High School by 15-year-old Gerald Locklear. Locklear was tried as an adult and was sentenced to 30 years in prison but was released after serving only 11.
May 22, 1968	Brownsville, Florida	1	1	2	Ernest Lee Grissom, a 15-year-old student at Drew Junior High School, seriously wounded a teacher and a 13-year-old student after he had been reprimanded for behavior. The student, Larry Jones, later died of his wounds.
June 10, 1968	Redwood City, California	0	1	1	A 15-year-old San Carlos High School student was showing a pistol to friends on a school bus when it discharged, wounding a 17-year-old in the back. The 15-year-old was charged with possession of a loaded gun and possession of marijuana.
August 8, 1968	Pasadena, California	0	1	1	A 14-year-old student was shot in the stomach at Washington Junior High School.
September 4, 1968	Chicago, Illinois	0	3	3	Two adult non-students and gang members opened fire inside Parker High School, wounding their target and two bystanders, all students.
September 20, 1968	Philadelphia, Pennsylvania	0	1	1	Three student gang members shot and wounded a 15-year-old student outside Olney High School's cafeteria. The shooters were taken into custody.
September 28, 1968	Chicago, Illinois	0	1	1	At Tilden High School, a violent clash between black and white students occurred when black students walked out of classes after a school pep rally was cancelled. Black and white members of neighborhood street gangs gathered in front of the school and began fighting; which resulted in a 16-year-old white student being shot.
October 1, 1968	Ypsilanti, Michigan	0	4	4	A 16-year-old student opened fire at a bus stop on the grounds of Willow Run High School after classes ended, wounding four other students.
October 7, 1968	Hartford, Connecticut	0	1	1	A 17-year-old Weaver High School student was injured in front of the school after dismissal.
October 10, 1968	Chattanooga, Tennessee	1	0	1	19-year-old James Braswell killed 17-year-old Lemone Ward inside Riverside High School. The shooter was arrested a few blocks away.
November 1, 1968	San Francisco, California	0	0	0	Galileo Academy of Science and Technology principal James Kearney was shot at in his office by a 16-year-old student, who was charged with attempted murder. The week previous, Kearney was attacked with a knife at a school dance as he tried to defuse a fight.
December 3, 1968	Wilkes-Barre, Pennsylvania	1	0	1	20-year-old Howard Moreida, a student at Wilkes College, was accidentally shot dead in a dormitory.
December 19, 1968	Fort Worth, Texas	0	1	1	A shooter wounded a 17-year-old student at I.M. Terrell High School during passing period.
1969
January 16, 1969	Republic, Pennsylvania	0	0	0	A 17-year-old fired multiple shots at Redstone Township Junior High School from outside the building. After walking towards a waste dump and firing more shots, he surrendered to police. He told officers he was angry with one of the teachers.
January 17, 1969	Westwood, California	2	0	2	Bunchy Carter and John Huggins, two student members of the Black Panther Party, were fatally shot during a student meeting inside Campbell Hall at the University of California, Los Angeles. Reportedly there was disagreement over who would control the school's African American Studies Center. The shooter, Claude Hubert, was never found; three other men were later arrested in connection with the shooting.
January 21, 1969	Louisville, Kentucky	0	0	0	A teenager fired a gun inside the auditorium of Shawnee Junior-Senior High School. Later that day, three shots were fired into the gym as classes were being held inside. A 16-year-old was charged with both shootings, as well as the wounding of a 68-year-old man that same day.
January 23, 1969	Washington, D.C.	1	0	1	45-year-old Cardozo Senior High School assistant principal Herman Clifford was killed in the school's hallway by 18-year-old Ronald Joyner while trying to stop him and two other youths who had robbed the school's bank.
January 23, 1969	Louisville, Kentucky	0	0	0	A student at Shawnee Junior-Senior High School accidentally fired a shot inside the principal's office. He explained that he had found a pistol he thought was unloaded on his way to school. No charges were filed.
February 1, 1969	Waterville, Maine	1	0	1	19-year-old Robert Merle Crowell died in an accidental shooting at a Colby College dormitory.
February 12, 1969	Mobile, Alabama	0	1	1	A teenager fired a rifle multiple times while students were playing football on the campus of Toulminville Junior High School, wounding a 14-year-old. A student who had reportedly fought with the wounded victim before was arrested.
February 13, 1969	Charlotte, North Carolina	0	1	1	A Johnson C. Smith University student accidentally shot himself in the foot during a fight.
March 8, 1969	San Francisco, California	0	0	0	A 21-year-old San Francisco State College student fired shots into two campus buildings.
April 8, 1969	Columbus, Mississippi	0	1	1	A student shot and wounded a classmate at Lee High School before disposing of his gun in a nearby pond.
April 14, 1969	San Francisco, California	0	1	1	A student at Woodrow Wilson High School was wounded by a pistol bullet as he entered a photography room.
April 17, 1969	Dayton, Ohio	0	1	1	A 17-year-old student shot another student, injuring him, during lunch hour at Dunbar High School. The shooter fled to his home, where he was arrested.
April 25, 1969	Chicago, Illinois	0	1	1	A 17-year-old student was shot when a racially motivated brawl erupted involving white and black students at Tilden High School. The brawl began in the school's auditorium and continued outside the school building. Eight Chicago police officers were injured and six students were charged with disorderly conduct in the incident.
May 10, 1969	Springfield, Ohio	1	0	1	21-year-old Wittenberg University student John C. Lobach was shot in the back and killed by a campus security guard. The guard and another officer apprehended Lobach after he reportedly was climbing on balconies of an all-women's dormitory to see his girlfriend. When Lobach attempted to escape, a guard fired a warning shot, striking Lobach.
May 13, 1969	Winston-Salem, North Carolina	1	0	1	13-year-old Ernest Napoleon Carter Jr. was accidentally killed by a 13-year-old classmate at Hanes Junior High School who was armed with a pistol. The shooter was charged with involuntary manslaughter. Carter's mother filed a lawsuit against the Winston-Salem/Forsyth County Board of Education for $50,000 in damages.
May 21, 1969	Pomona, California	0	0	0	A 21-year-old man who lived across the street from Pomona High School fired several shots at students on the athletic field.
September 19, 1969	Oakland, California	0	1	1	A 17-year-old student at Oakland High School was shot by a 15-year-old in a case of mistaken identity.
October 3, 1969	Nashville, Tennessee	0	1	1	A teenager was shot outside Southern Nash School, where a school dance was taking place. Seven teenagers were arrested for their connections to the shooting, which was reportedly gang-related.
October 6, 1969	Cleveland, Ohio	1	0	1	16-year-old East Technical High School student William Hamilton was shot and killed on the school's steps. 16-year-old Robert DeVaughn was arrested eight days later for the shooting.
October 8, 1969	Miami, Florida	0	1	1	An 11-year-old student was shot in the arm on the playground of North Carol City Elementary School. Police said the gunshot came from an unknown source outside of the school.
October 11, 1969	Houston, Texas	0	1	1	Two robbers assaulted and shot a University of Houston student twice on the college's campus, including in the head. The student survived and was listed in fair condition.
November 17, 1969	Los Angeles, California	0	1	1	A 16-year-old wounded a 17-year-old Gardena High School student during a fight in the school's cafeteria. He was arrested after surrendering to a teacher.
November 19, 1969	Tomah, Wisconsin	1	0	1	46-year-old Martin Mogensen, principal of Tomah Junior High School, was killed in his office by a 14-year-old boy. the student was determined to be in diminished capacity at the time of the shooting and was put into the Mendota State Hospital instead of being sent to jail and was released from the hospital in 1972.
November 20, 1969	Benton Harbor, Michigan	0	1	1	16-year-old Chester Dossett was seriously wounded after being shot in the shoulder by another student as Dossett left a classroom during dismissal at Benton Harbor High School. An 18-year-old student was charged with assault with intent to commit murder.
November 21, 1969	Eugene, Oregon	0	1	1	A 19-year-old student was shot by a 21-year-old man at the student union of the University of Oregon. The shooter fled the scene.
November 26, 1969	Los Angeles, California	0	1	1	A 16-year-old shot and injured an 18-year-old student at Locke High School. The shooter was arrested on suspicion of assault with intent to commit murder.
December 5, 1969	Hammond, Indiana	0	2	2	After a basketball game at Oliver P. Morton High School, someone fired a gun into a departing car containing students, wounding a student in the neck and grazing the driver. A teacher and several onlookers were also fired upon in a separate shooting.
December 15, 1969	Washington, D.C.	0	1	1	An 18-year-old Anacostia Senior High School student was accidentally shot in the chest by another student with a gun that had been illegally brought into the school by a non-student.

=== 1970s ===
58 incidents.

Date	Location	Deaths	Injuries	Total	Description
1970
January 5, 1970	Washington, D.C.	1	1	2	15-year-old Tyrone Perry was killed at Hine Junior High School and another student was injured.
January 5, 1970	Washington, D.C.	0	1	1	A 14-year-old student shot and wounded another boy at John Philip Sousa Junior High School.
February 11, 1970	Philadelphia, Pennsylvania	2	1	3	University of Pennsylvania professors 40-year-old Walter Koppelman and 45-year-old Oscar Goldman were shot by 33-year-old disgruntled graduate student Robert Cantor during a seminar. Cantor then took his own life. Koppelman died March 5 from his injuries, but Goldman recovered.
April 15, 1970	Pine Bluff, Arkansas	1	5	6	There was a shooting at Coleman High School resulting in five injuries and one death.
April 23, 1970	Wilmington, Delaware	1	0	1	A PS duPont High School, 17-year-old football player Derek A. Johnson, was shot and killed by teammate 16-year-old Carlton E. Thornton, who had confronted him to stop the bullying against his siblings. Thornton pleaded guilty to manslaughter and was sentenced to 10 years in prison but was released on probation after serving seven years.
September 24, 1970	Meridian, Idaho	1	0	1	15-year-old Charles Clegg was accidentally shot and killed in the parking lot at Meridian High School while he and friends examined a pistol.
September 28, 1970	Davenport, Iowa	0	0	0	A student fired a shot in the school bathroom at Central High School.
October 5, 1970	Pontiac, Michigan	0	4	4	Outside of Pontiac Central High School four students were wounded after a fight broke out among many students and one of the students drew a pistol and fired, no perpetrators had been identified.
October 19, 1970	Memphis, Tennessee	0	1	1	A 17-year-old shot and wounded a non-student at Booker T. Washington High School.
October 20, 1970	Nashville, Tennessee	0	1	1	A 13-year-old was charged after a 15-year-old student was shot in the leg at Washington Junior High School.
November 20, 1970	Chicago, Illinois	0	2	2	Two students were shot while standing in a second-floor hallway of Harlan High School. Fifteen-year-old Kenneth House was shot in the lower left abdomen and left in serious condition. 14-year-old Portia Walls suffered a superficial wound on her lower back. The incident was thought to have involved gang recruiting in the school.
1971
February 2, 1971	Philadelphia, Pennsylvania	1	0	1	56-year-old teacher Samson L. Freedman was killed by 14-year-old student Kevin Simmons as he left Morris E. Leeds School. Freedman had suspended Simmons earlier in the day for cursing in the hallway.
May 27, 1971	Benton Harbor, Michigan	0	1	1	At Benton Harbor High School, A 16-year-old male student was shot and injured due to a feud between students.
September 29, 1971	Petersburg, Virginia	1	2	3	14-year-old Edward Bell opened fire in a classroom at Peabody High School, killing another 14-year-old and wounding two other students. He was disarmed by a teacher and arrested.
November 3, 1971	Carlsbad, New Mexico	1	1	2	A mentally ill Vietnam War veteran and former Carlsbad Mid-High School student climbed into a tower on campus and shot into the street and at responding police, slightly wounding one deputy, then committed suicide.
November 11, 1971	Spokane, Washington	2	4	6	21-year-old former MIT student Larry J. Harmon, armed with a rifle, killed 68-year-old caretaker Hilary Kunzon, who came upon him wrecking St. Aloysius Roman Catholic Church, then fled onto the campus of Gonzaga University, where he wounded four more people before he was shot and killed by police. Harmon was described by his father as a religious fanatic claiming to have visions.
1972
January 24, 1972	Stow, Ohio	0	1	1	A 16-year-old student at Stow High School shot and wounded his chemistry teacher during an argument.
March 13, 1972	Tulare, California	0	1	1	At Tulare Western High School, student Albert Greenwood Brown brought a gun to school which he accidentally fired and grazed another student in the head.
May 4, 1972	Reno, Nevada	1	0	1	33-year-old Libby Booth Elementary school principal Virgil Ouren was shot three times with a 22-caliber pistol which killed him instantly. The shooter, sixth grade teacher 53-year-old Samuel Grinstead Knipmeyer fled to Mexico, then moved to California and finally to Bend, Oregon where he was arrested on October 26, 1977.
May 5, 1972	Indianapolis, Indiana	1	0	1	At Decatur Central High School sophomore student George Jenkins was shot to death in his classroom by his sister Mickey who was a senior student.
July 25, 1972	Manhattan, New York	0	1	1	Dean Henry S. Coleman, the dean of students for Columbia College, was shot three times by 20-year-old Eldridge McKinney at his office in Hamilton Hall. McKinney had been expelled and had gotten into an argument with Coleman, demanding to be reinstated before pulling out a pistol.
September 15, 1972	Saginaw, Michigan	0	2	2	At Saginaw High School, A 17-year-old male student shot two other 17-year-old male students at in the school hallway due to a longstanding argument between two of the students, the third student was an innocent bystander.
November 16, 1972	Baton Rouge, Louisiana	2	0	2	At Southern University during a peaceful protest, two African American students were shot and killed by white sheriffs deputies. The deputies who fired the shots were never identified.
November 27, 1972	Pontiac, Michigan	0	5	5	At Pontiac Central High School five students were wounded, one seriously when a crowd of students gathered around a 16-year-old white student who was being kicked and beaten up by black students when 16-year-old Roderick Bortón, another student pushed through the crowd and opened fire with a 22-caliber pistol, the fight and shooting were believed to be racially motivated.
1973
February 26, 1973	Richmond, Virginia	1	0	1	17-year-old Wayne Phillips was killed when he was caught between two youths who were fighting in the hallway of Armstrong High School.
October 19, 1973	St. Louis, Missouri	1	0	1	17-year old William Wiggins was accidentally shot and killed outside of the cafeteria of Beaumont High School.
November 6, 1973	Oakland, California	1	1	2	School superintendent Marcus Foster was killed and his assistant Robert Blackburn was wounded when members of the Symbionese Liberation Army opened fire on them as they exited a school board meeting. Two members of the SLA were later arrested and convicted of the crime. Both were sentenced to life in prison without the possibility of parole. The SLA had reportedly believed that Foster supported a measure to install police on school grounds and make students carry identification cards. In reality, Foster opposed both measures.
1974
January 17, 1974	Chicago, Illinois	1	3	4	52-year-old elementary school principal Rudolph Jezek Jr. was killed in his office by 14-year-old Steven Guy, a former student. Assistant principal Gordon Sharp and janitor Ezekiel Thomas were injured by gunshot wounds while 29-year-old 8th grade teacher Peter Smith was injured while escaping due to falling down a flight of stairs. Guy said to be angry about being transferred to a social adjustment center.
January 30, 1974	New Orleans, Louisiana	1	0	1	A 23-year-old Louisiana State University in New Orleans student fired shots inside a school library and took three hostages. After releasing them, he shot and killed himself.
March 22, 1974	Brownstown, Indiana	1	0	1	48-year-old James T. Blevins, athletic director at Brownstown Central High School, was fatally shot in the school parking lot by David L Fleetwood, a 17-year-old student waiting for him. He gave the police no motive. Fleetwood was convicted of voluntary manslaughter and sentenced to 2 to 21 years in prison.
October 4, 1974	Kent, Ohio	0	1	1	19-year-old McKeesport, Pennsylvania student Ray D. Gilmore was wounded in a scuffle with two men in his third-floor campus dormitory room at Kent State University. 26-year-old Benjamin F. Goodman and 22-year-old Carl Bell, who were not students, had their .32-caliber pistols taken and were wrestled to the floor by other students.
December 30, 1974	Olean, New York	3 (including a pregnant woman)	11	14	1974 Olean High School shooting: During a two-and-a-half-hour siege, 17-year-old honor student Anthony Barbaro, the best marksman on his rifle team, killed three adults, one pregnant, in and around his high school and wounded 11 others. He shot from the windows at the street and neighborhood. The school was closed for the Christmas holiday. Barbaro committed suicide in prison before he could stand trial.
1975
February 18, 1975	Poughkeepsie, New York	1	0	1	Marist College freshman Shelley Sperling was shot and killed in the dining hall by her ex-boyfriend, Louis Acevedo.
February 24, 1975	Penns Grove, New Jersey	1	1	2	24-year-old David Gary killed the 33-year-old Reverend Thomas Quinlan inside a classroom at St. James School. Quinlan was the school's principal. A teacher was also wounded. Gary was sentenced to life in prison for the crime.
March 18, 1975	St. Louis, Missouri	1	0	1	16-year-old Stephen Goods, a bystander, was killed during a fight between other teens. Three youths were convicted for the homicide.
September 11, 1975	Oklahoma City, Oklahoma	1	5	6	Student James Briggs killed fellow student Randy Truitt at Grant High School, wounding several others. Briggs was convicted of first-degree manslaughter by an Oklahoma County juvenile court jury the following year. A judge ordered Briggs committed to an unidentified, nonprofit institution in another state until he turned 18.
1976
February 9, 1976	Detroit, Michigan	1	0	1	Emma Tillman was shot and killed in her classroom in front of the children by her estranged husband Arthur Tillman at Woodward Elementary School who was sentenced to life in prison.
February 12, 1976	Detroit, Michigan	0	5	5	Intruders entered Murray-Wright High School, shooting and wounding five students after an apparent dispute over a girlfriend of one of the intruders.
February 19, 1976	Mid-Wilshire, California	1	9	10	1976 Computer Learning Center shooting: 18-year-old Neil Liebeskind of Chatsworth, California entered a Los Angeles computer school and opened fire on his class with a 12-gauge shotgun, killing 24-year-old Fernando E. Alcivar and wounding 6 others, in an attempt to kill another student. After Liebeskind left the classroom, he was confronted by an armed security officer, Howard Barnes, who ordered him to drop his weapon. Liebeskind shot and wounded Barnes, but Barnes and a second security guard returned fire and critically wounded Liebeskind with a shot to the neck. Liebeskind had previously been shot and wounded by a homeowner four years earlier while burglarizing a house in Woodland Hills, California. In January 1977, a jury found Liebeskind not guilty by reason of insanity and he was confined to a psychiatric hospital. The shooting disrupted a filming of the television series Jigsaw John.
July 12, 1976	Fullerton, California	7	2	9	1976 California State University, Fullerton massacre: 37-year-old Edward Charles Allaway, a custodian at the California State University, Fullerton library, shot and killed seven people and wounded two others in the library's first-floor lobby and at the building's Instructional Media Center (IMC), located in the basement. Allaway was convicted of murder, but a judge ruled him insane and ordered him confined to a mental institution.
November 10, 1976	Detroit, Michigan	1	0	1	A man entered the Burt Elementary School campus and walked into a second-grade teachers classroom then shot and killed The teacher Bettye McCaster who happened to be the shooters estranged wife who had transferred to the school from a different school in order to get away from her husband. The shooter, Al Junior Lewis was convicted of second-degree murder and sentenced to life in prison.
December 9, 1976	St. Louis, Missouri	0	0	0	An 11-year-old Fremont School student fired multiple shots within the school before fleeing and being taken into custody.
1977
April 7, 1977	Whitharral, Texas	1	0	1	High School principal M. O. Tripp was killed on the front steps of the school by 17-year-old student Ricardo Lopez for unknown reasons. Lopez was convicted of murder and subsequently sentenced to life in prison.
May 30, 1977	Hayward, California	2	0	2	Fred Moreno, An officer with the California State University, Hayward Police Department got into an argument with a sergeant and a patrolman following a call at a campus field station. The argument escalated, and the officer shot both men, killing them. Moreno was initially convicted of first and second degree murder but was retried and convicted of voluntary manslaughter resulting in a 5-year-to-life prison sentence.
November 19, 1977	Washington, DC	0	2	2	A young man wearing a hood and surgical mask shot and seriously injured the business manager of St. John's College High School during an attempted robbery.
December 2, 1977	Coral Gables, Florida	1	2	3	22-year-old University of Miami student Jeffery Sacks shot and wounded two men at his campus apartment, then went to his ex-girlfriend's residence and fatally shot himself.
1978
January 11, 1978	Hopkinsville, Kentucky	0	1	1	13-year-old student Andre Davis was wounded while watching a fight between two students in the front lobby of Christian County Middle School, one of whom had a gun. A 16-year-old was charged with the assault.
February 9, 1978	St. Albans, West Virginia	1	0	1	14-year-old Hayes Junior High School student Stuart Wayne Perrock killed 14-year-old schoolmate Arthur Clinton Smith. He subsequently fled the school, sparking a search that lasted several hours before he was arrested and he was tried as a juvenile.
February 22, 1978	Lansing, Michigan	1	1	2	After being taunted for his beliefs, 15-year-old Roger Needham, a self-proclaimed neo-Nazi, killed one student and wounded a second with a pistol at Everett High School. He was tried as a juvenile for the crime.
April 4, 1978	Dearborn, Michigan	0	1	1	At Fordson High School an 18-year-old student was shot in the head in a locker room by a 16-year-old student with a handgun.
April 26, 1978	South Dallas, Texas	1	0	1	38-year-old Woodrow Porter, a janitor at Paul Dunbar Elementary School, was killed by the 56-year-old grandmother of an eight-year-old who was allegedly spanked by Porter earlier.
May 18, 1978	Northwest Hills, Texas	1	0	1	13-year-old John Daniel Christian, son of Lyndon B. Johnson's former press secretary George Christian, killed his English teacher, 29-year-old Wilbur Grayson, with his father's rifle in front of approximately 30 classmates at Murchison Junior High School. Christian was arrested and charged but not prosecuted; he was committed to a mental hospital where he was treated for a period and released.
October 17, 1978	University City, Missouri	0	4	4	18-year-old Larry Ward and two companions were escorted from the halls of University City High School following a fight with 18-year-old student Carl Triplett. Ward ran back into the building with a gun and fired shots into a group, critically injuring Triplett in the chest and hip and wounding 17-year-old Angela Darden and 16-year-old Jennifer Pride. Ward sustained a head injury as he was tackled by assistant principal, Franklin McCallie. His companions grabbed the gun and fled.
October 17, 1978	Lanett, Alabama	0	1	1	13-year-old Robin Robinson was paddled by Lanett Junior High School principal Lewis Hoggs after having a disagreement with another student. Robinson left the school and returned with a .22-caliber handgun and shot Hoggs, grazing the top of his head. Robinson was arrested two hours later about two blocks from the school and was later charged in juvenile court.
1979
January 29, 1979	San Carlos, San Diego, California	2	9	11	Cleveland Elementary School shooting: 16-year-old Brenda Spencer opened fire on Grover Cleveland Elementary School from her home across the street, killing two adults and wounding nine people. Spencer was sentenced to 25 years to life and remains in prison.
April 16, 1979	Milwaukee, Wisconsin	0	1	1	17-year-old Timothy Stahle was critically wounded in the leg and upper thigh with shot gun pellets as he threw rocks at the windows of Wisconsin Lutheran High School. 28-year-old school janitor Kenneth B. Stein was arrested.
September 28, 1979	Charlestown, Massachusetts	0	1	1	15-year-old sophomore Darryl Williams was shot in the neck by a sniper during the halftime interval while standing with teammates and coach in the end zone of the Charlestown High School football field. The player for the predominantly black Jamaica Plain High School team was left paralyzed. A racial motivation was determined by Mayor Kevin White. 17-year-old white youths Joseph Nardone and Stephen McGonagle were charged with the shooting and received 10-year sentences.
October 3, 1979	Columbia, South Carolina	2	5	7	Mark A. Houston a sophomore student at University of South Carolina opened fire during a party at a fraternity house, killing two and injuring five. Houston was sentenced to two consecutive life terms plus an additional 76 years for the shooting.

=== 1980s ===
83 incidents.

Date	Location	Deaths	Injuries	Total	Description
1980
January 7, 1980	Stamps, Arkansas	1	0	1	16-year-old Evan Hampton, a freshman at Lafayette County High School, waited in a classroom for 19-year-old student Mike Sanders, whom he immediately killed. Hampton went to the principal's office, turned in the gun and waited for his arrest by police.
March 20, 1980	Dallas, Texas	1	0	1	49-year-old fifth-grade teacher Rosie Pearson was killed in J. Leslie Patton School by an unknown assailant.
March 26, 1980	Big Rapids, Michigan	1	0	1	Business professor Robert Brauer was killed in class by 20-year-old student Thomas Kakonis at Ferris State College, who had failed an exam in his class. Kakonis was the son of an associate dean at the college. Kakonis was found not guilty by reason of insanity.
October 31, 1980	Hueytown, Alabama	1	1	2	17-year-old Rudy Farmer pulled out a .22-caliber pistol and wounded a fellow student in the art room of Hueytown High School, then turned the gun on himself.
1981
January 27, 1981	Fayetteville, Arkansas	1	1	2	19-year-old former freshman James Howard Taylor brought a 12-gauge single-shot shotgun into the Delta Delta Delta sorority house on the University of Arkansas campus. He entered the house at 5:45 p.m. and terrorized an initiation dinner. After attempting to negotiate a surrender, he was shot and killed by police when he aimed his shotgun into the dining room.
April 17, 1981	Ann Arbor, Michigan	2	0	2	1981 Bursley Hall shooting: As students fled their rooms after a homemade firebomb set a minor blaze on the sixth floor hallway of Bursley Hall dormitory, 22-year-old psychology student Leo E. Kelly Jr. fired a sawn-off 12-gauge shotgun at his University of Michigan schoolmates at point-blank range. 19-year-old pre-medical student Edward Siwik and 21-year-old resident advisor Douglas C. McGreaham died in hospitals a few hours later. Kelly had been dismissed from UM once and was on the verge of another dismissal due to poor grades. In 1982, he was convicted on two counts of first-degree murder and sentenced to life in prison.
December 16, 1981	Portland, Oregon	2	0	2	Shortly before noon in Engineering Hall on the school's campus in north Portland, 34-year-old University of Portland night janitor John C. Holbrook killed 37-year-old engineering teacher Brian D. Massey before taking his own life.
1982
March 19, 1982	Las Vegas, Nevada	1	3	4	17-year-old Valley High School student Patrick Lizotte killed his teacher Clarence Pigott and wounded two students, before being shot and wounded by police. Lizotte was originally sentenced to life in prison without parole, but his sentence was reduced and he was paroled in 2017 after the passage of Nevada Assembly Bill 267, which “revises provisions concerning the sentencing and parole of persons convicted as an adult for a crime committed when the person was less than 18 years of age," in 2015.
April 5, 1982	Hot Springs, Arkansas	2	0	2	26-year-old Kelvin Ray Love, who was struggling academically, entered Garland Community College in Hot Springs, Arkansas, and shot dead his teacher, 38-year-old William "Buddy" Putnam, and fellow student Donald Schamp, 34, with a .357 magnum revolver. Love fired six shots during the incident before taking a female student hostage and forcing her to flee with him in her car. During the ensuing 125-mile high-speed chase, Love exchanged shots with pursuing patrol officers but no one was injured. The pursuit came to an end after Love crashed through a police roadblock and wrecked his vehicle; both he and his hostage survived unharmed. Love was later found guilty of two counts of capital murder and sentenced to life imprisonment without parole.
April 7, 1982	Littleton, Colorado	1	0	1	13-year-old Deer Creek Junior High School student Scott Darwin Michael was killed by 14-year-old classmate Jason Price Rocha. Rocha was tried as an adult and sentenced to 12 years in prison, plus one year of parole but was instead released in 1987 at the age of 20.
November 8, 1982	Hubbell-Lyndon, Michigan	0	2	2	Two students were accidentally shot in a hallway at Cooley High School when the shooter, another student, was showing off a handgun.
November 12, 1982	Jackson, Mississippi	2	0	2	18-year-old dropout James Hartzog killed his girlfriend, 17-year-old Faye Williams, in her algebra class at Wingfield High School. Hartzog then took his own life.
December 20, 1982	Detroit, Michigan	0	1	1	At Finney High School, a 15-year-old student was shot in the abdomen when three men entered the school and went to the hallway where the student was, demanded his jacket and after he gave it to them one of the men shot him anyway.
1983
January 20, 1983	Ballwin, Missouri	2	1	3	14-year-old Parkway South Middle School student David F. Lawler, sitting in a study hall classroom of 28 students, opened fire, killing Randall Koger and injuring Greg Saffo. Lawler then took his own life.
April 21, 1983	St. Louis, Missouri	0	1	1	18-year old Byron Puckett was accidentally shot in the abdomen after stepping between two fighting teens in the basement restroom of Beaumont High School.
May 16, 1983	Lake Highlands, Texas	1	0	1	Billy Conn Gardner, a friend of a food-service worker's husband, robbed the Lake Highlands High School cafeteria manager at gunpoint as she was counting the day's revenue in the office. Gardner shot her and took $1,600. Gardner was subsequently sentenced to death for the crime and was executed by lethal injection on February 16, 1995.
May 16, 1983	Brentwood, New York	1	2	3	After being fired from his job as a substitute teacher for fighting with a student, Robert O. Wickes entered Brentwood East Junior High School in Brentwood, New York, dressed in camouflage fatigues and armed with a semi-automatic .22-caliber rifle and over 100 rounds of ammunition, to get revenge on the student, 15-year-old Luis Burgos. Shortly after noon, Wickes entered a ninth-grade social-studies classroom inside the school and fired three shots at Burgos, hitting him twice in the stomach and hand, before taking the entire class of 18 students hostage. School principal William Howland was also shot and wounded by Wickes when Howland peered into the classroom. After firing four shots down the hall at responding police officers, Wickes barricaded himself inside the classroom and a standoff ensued. During the standoff, Wickes periodically released 17 of the 18 hostages before shooting himself in the head nine hours into the siege, dying in the hospital later that night. Both Burgos and Howland survived their injuries.
September 12, 1983	Detroit, Michigan	1	0	1	At Henry Ford High School, a 16-year-old student was fatally shot after a fight which was believed to be gang-related.
September 28, 1983	Greenville, Mississippi	1	0	1	16-year-old Willie Earl Reed fatally shot 16-year-old Robert Lee Merrill in a classroom at Coleman Junior High School. Reed was sentenced to life in prison for the shooting.
November 8, 1983	Highland Park, Michigan	1	0	1	At Highland Park High School a 15-year-old student shot and killed a 17-year-old student, the shooting is believed to be related to an earlier fight between the two students.
November 18, 1983	Harlem Park, Maryland	1	0	1	14-year-old Dewitt Duckett was shot in the neck and killed at Harlem Park Junior High School. Alfred Chestnut and Ransom Watkins, who were both 16 at the time, and 17-year-old Andrew Stewart were convicted of the murder and sentenced to life in prison. However, evidence was withheld from the defense that pointed to another suspect, 18-year-old Michael Willis, who witnesses said saw run away and ditch the gun; Willis died in 2002. The case was reviewed and the evidence that was withheld was recovered and used by the defense. Four teenage witnesses who testified against the three in the first trial recanted, saying they were pressured by police to change their stories. In November 2019, Chestnut, Watkins and Stewart were exonerated.
December 2, 1983	Crawfordsville, Indiana	0	1	1	17-year-old Calvin Dowell was shot during a senior economics class at Crawfordsville High School by fellow student 17-year-old Grant Carey in a dispute over a girl. The case was waived to adult court, and Grant was sentenced to six years in prison. Dowell survived the shooting but was paralyzed.
December 17, 1983	Ithaca, New York	2	1	3	Su Yong Kim took seven Cornell University students hostage at a dorm, including a woman who had rejected him. The gunman let all the hostages go except for the woman and her roommate, before shooting both. After fleeing the scene and being pursued by police the gunman shot himself in the head but survived. Kim was sentenced to 25 years to life.
1984
January 5, 1984	Baltimore, Maryland	0	1	1	One student who was arguing with 4 other students was injured on the Lake Clifton Eastern High School parking lot.
February 24, 1984	Los Angeles, California	3	12	15	49th Street Elementary School shooting: Tyrone Mitchell killed two people and wounded twelve others when shooting at students leaving 49th Street Elementary School. He then committed suicide.
April 18, 1984	Detroit, Michigan	1	0	1	13-year-old Kelly Crittendon was accidentally killed by two classmates in a classroom at the Precious Blood School.
May 11, 1984	Fresno, California	1	2	3	A 33-year-old student shot and wounded a teacher and a student with a revolver at Fresno City College. The student then killed herself with a shot to the head.
May 17, 1984	Pleasant Hill, Iowa	2	0	2	17-year-old student Todd Dunahoo killed 16-year-old Valerie Rockafellow in the hallway at Southeast Polk High School, then turned the gun on himself.
May 17, 1984	Houston, Texas	1	1	2	A 19-year-old student brought a handgun to a Booker T. Washington High School classroom, wounded a 17-year-old student, then committed suicide.
May 18, 1984	Norco, California	0	12	12	A 17-year-old student brought a shotgun on the Norco High School campus and fired a round in the air. Several students tackled the gunman and a second shot went off. A dozen students suffered minor injuries either from shot or the scuffle to secure the gun.
July 10, 1984	Detroit, Michigan	0	1	1	An 18-year-old was shot in the arm near the Mumford High School parking lot by mistake in a gang-related incident.
September 27, 1984	Harris County, Texas	0	1	1	On September 27, 28-year-old Samuel George shot at 13-year-old Curtis McGuffie with a .22-caliber rifle outside Bleyl Middle School in Houston, Texas. On the same day, George shot and wounded 10-year-old Joshua Baker Littell as he raised the American flag at Millsap Elementary School in Cypress, Texas. George told authorities he was "angry and upset with the world". He was charged with one count of attempted murder and two counts of assault with a deadly weapon.
September 28, 1984	North Richland Hills, Texas	0	1	1	1981 alumnus Barry Wayne Shaw returned to his alma mater Richland High School carrying a 9mm Uzi submachine gun, an AR-15 and a .45-caliber pistol looking for Ms. Ball, his English teacher. After some time, he gave up the hunt, yelled out "Homecoming, homecoming," and sprayed the school's foyer with 30 rounds of ammunition. None of the dozen or so students in the foyer was hit, though one was injured by flying debris. Principal Ray Williams arrived to confront him after Barry had fired his last shot. Barry threw both rifles at Ray, saying, "I did it." Ray had Barry sit down and wait for the police. Barry offered no resistance. It was later discovered that Barry had killed Dallas karate instructor Jimmy Glen Wilson and wounded Rudy Smedley earlier in the week with the submachine gun. He was charged with two counts of intent to commit murder, one count of retaliation and one count of murder. Shaw was sentenced to 44 years in prison for the murder and 15 for the attempted murder.
October 22, 1984	Detroit, Michigan	0	2	2	In the hallway of Central High School, two students, a male and a female (both 16) were shot during a fight.
October 24, 1984	Celina, Ohio	1	0	1	45-year-old Shirley Shindeldecker killed 54-year-old school-bus driver Gene Green as he stopped to pick up the son of Shindeldecker's estranged husband. After serving 19 months of her sentence, Shindeldecker was found not guilty by reason of insanity and released.
October 25, 1984	Detroit, Michigan	0	1	1	At Southeastern High School during a fight between a 17-year-old male and a 15-year-old male, a security guard grabbed the 17-year-old around the waist during which a gun that the 17-year-old was carrying fell out of his jacket pocket. It hit the security guard's foot, discharged and hit the 15-year-old male in the left leg.
1985
January 21, 1985	Goddard, Kansas	1	3	4	Armed with a rifle and a handgun, 14-year-old James Alan Kearbey killed principal James McGee and wounded two teachers and a student at Goddard Junior High School. Kearbey was released in 1991 but was arrested again in 2001 after being found with a gun; he was paroled in 2003.
September 27, 1985	Trotwood, Ohio	0	2	2	Two students were wounded by an accidental gunshot in a classroom at Trotwood-Madison Senior High School.
October 8, 1985	Baltimore, Maryland	1	0	1	One student who was arguing with 4 other students was killed on the Lake Clifton Eastern High School parking lot.
October 18, 1985	Woodbridge, Michigan	0	7	7	Murray-Wright High School shooting: During halftime of the homecoming football game between Northwestern and Murray-Wright high schools, a youth opened fire with a shotgun, injuring seven people including six students with whom he had fought earlier in the day.
November 26, 1985	Spanaway, Washington	3	0	3	Spanaway Junior High School shooting: Armed with a .22-caliber rifle, 14-year-old Heather Smith shot and killed 15-year-old Gordon Pickett, her ex-boyfriend, and 14-year-old Christopher Ricco outside the gymnasium at Spanaway Junior High School, before fleeing the school grounds. After a two-hour manhunt, she returned to the school. After a short standoff with police, she shot herself in the right temple; she died the following day.
December 3, 1985	Concord, New Hampshire	1	1	2	At Concord High School, 16-year-old dropout Louis Cartier entered the school with a shotgun and took two students hostage: 18-year-old Patrick Lena and 16-year-old Scott Hayes, before engaging in a standoff with responding police officers. After the gunman aimed his weapon at football coach Don LeBrun, Concord Police Officer Michael Russell shot Cartier in the head with his service revolver, wounding him. Cartier returned fire with one shotgun blast at police, wounding police officer Stephen McDonnell in the chin with a shotgun pellet, before being shot twice more in the chest by Russell and CPD Officer John Clark. Cartier died of his wounds the following day in the hospital; Officer McDonnell was treated and released.
December 10, 1985	Portland, Connecticut	1	2	3	After being suspended for refusing to take off his hat while at school, 13-year-old student Floyd Warmsley pulled out a firearm at Portland Junior High School, shooting and wounding the 53-year-old school secretary Lynn Haddad and killing 36-year-old janitor David Bangston.
1986
January 29, 1986	Baltimore, Maryland	1	0	1	At Lake Clifton High School a student who was being beaten up fatally shot his attacker.
March 6, 1986	Dolton, Illinois	0	1	1	52-year-old math teacher Norma Cooper was shot in the shoulder at Thornridge High School by one of her freshman students, who apparently had recently received poor grades. He was charged with attempted murder, unlawful use of a weapon and aggravated battery.
April 29, 1986	Senath, Missouri	1	0	1	Using a 20-gauge shotgun, 16-year-old Ritchie Overman shot and killed 15-year-old Leslie Lynn Wyatt in front of a classroom of students and teacher Sheila Adams at Senath-Hornersville High School.
May 9, 1986	Fayetteville, North Carolina	0	3	3	17-year-old student Major Ray Simmons shot and wounded three classmates, one critically, at Pine Forest High School with a .25-caliber handgun.
May 16, 1986	Cokeville, Wyoming	2	79 (Note: One by gunfire)	81	Cokeville Elementary School hostage crisis: 43-year-old former town marshal David Young and his 47-year-old wife Doris Young took 136 children and 18 adults hostage at Cokeville Elementary School. During the standoff, Doris accidentally detonated a bomb she was carrying, injuring herself and 73 others. David then shot and killed Doris, shot and wounded a teacher, and committed suicide.
December 4, 1986	Lewistown, Montana	1	3	4	14-year-old Kristofor Hans intended to shoot his French teacher, LaVonne Simonfy, at Fergus High School because of a failing grade. Instead, Henrietta Smith, who was substituting for Simonfy, was shot in the face and died. Hans fired several other shots as he fled, wounding vice principal John Moffatt, and two students. He then ran about a mile to his home, where he was arrested after the police surrounded his house. A classmate said Hans had repeatedly threatened to kill Ms. Simonfy, saying, "I'm going to blow Simonfy's head off." He was charged as an adult, convicted and sentenced to 206 years in prison. Hans was released in June 2015.
1987
January 23, 1987	Detroit, Michigan	0	1	1	A 15-year-old boy fired five shots in gym class at Redford High School, wounding 15-year-old Marcus Childress. The shooting stemmed from a fight of two groups of teenagers.
February 4, 1987	Northridge, California	2	0	2	35-year-old associate professor of computer science Djamshid (Amir) Asgari was confronted in the Engineering Building of California State University, Northridge by 25-year-old graduate student Fawwaz Abdin. Abdin was angry about a low grade Asgari had given him a year earlier, which caused him to be put on academic probation. After Asgari refused to change his grade, Abdin shot him twice, then fatally shot himself. Asgari later died at the Northridge Hospital.
February 13, 1987	Mayer, Arizona	1	2	3	After being caught with beer at the Orme School in Mayer, Arizona, 17-year-old Jarod Huskey went on a shooting rampage on the school campus, wounding two people, before being killed in a shootout with police.
March 2, 1987	De Kalb, Missouri	2	0	2	After constant teasing about his weight, 12-year-old honors student Nathan Faris killed 13-year-old classmate Timothy Perrin at Dekalb High School, then turned the gun on himself.
March 9, 1987	Compton, California	1	0	1	Compton Unified School District police officer Roosevelt Farrell was shot in the leg after confronting three juvenile intruders as he was patrolling the campus of Chester Adult School in Compton, California. Farrell died on March 16 from complications resulting from the wound. The 16-year-old gunman was arrested and charged with murder; two other youths were sought by police.
April 16, 1987	Woodbridge, Michigan	1	2	3	Murray-Wright High School second shooting: A ninth-grade student at Murray-Wright High School shot and killed 17-year-old Chester Jackson and wounded 17-year-old Damon Matthews and 18-year-old Tomeka Turner.
September 28, 1987	Lansing, Illinois	0	1	1	After being kicked off the soccer team for smoking on school grounds, 16-year-old student Blake Docter of Illiana Christian High School shot 44-year-old John Hoogewerf, the teacher who had reported him for smoking, in the chest. In September 1989, Docter was sentenced to spend the next 12 weekends in jail, was given a fine of $1,000 and put on 30 months of adult probation.
October 14, 1987	Chicago, Illinois	1	0	1	15-year-old freshman student Dartagnan Young of DuSable High School was shot to death in a third-floor hallway of the school by 16-year-old student Larry Sims. Sims, a documented gang member, had argued with Young the previous day about street–gang activity. Sims was convicted in 1994 of first degree murder and sentenced to 40 years in prison.
November 4, 1987	Detroit, Michigan	0	1	1	A 16-year-old male was shot while sitting in his car in the Southwestern High School parking lot when the shooter approached the victim, asked him for money then shot him when he told him he did not have any money.
1988
February 11, 1988	Largo, Florida	1	3	4	Pinellas Park Highschool shooting: 15-year-old students Jason Harless and Jason McCoy took stolen .38-caliber revolvers to Pinellas Park High School. Harless shot two assistant principals and a student teacher inside the school's cafeteria. 53-year-old Richard Allen died from his injuries; Nancy Blackwelder and intern Joseph Bloznalis were wounded. Harless was shot and wounded during a shootout with police outside the school; McCoy was later apprehended at a residence.
March 4, 1988	Detroit, Michigan	0	1	1	A 13-year-old girl played with a gun on the school bus and fired it by accident and injured a 12-year-old.
May 16, 1988	Fort Myers, Florida	0	1	1	14-year-old Jeremy Strong was shot and wounded by a 14-year-old Fort Myers Middle School student on a bus.
May 20, 1988	Winnetka, Illinois	2	5	7	1988 Winnetka attacks: 30-year-old Laurie Dann killed eight-year-old Nick Corwin inside Hubbard Woods School. Five additional students were wounded. Dann later committed suicide after taking hostages in a nearby home.
June 16, 1988	Detroit, Michigan	0	1	1	A 14-year-old male student and a 15-year-old male student got into a fight at Joy Middle School, after the fight the younger one went home, retrieved a handgun then went back to the school and shot the older boy at the school stairwell.
June 30, 1988	Oahu, Hawaii	0	1	1	17-year-old 'Aiea High School student Romel Castro shot his summer school teacher who survived.
July 10, 1988	Milwaukee, Wisconsin	0	1	1	25-year-old Robin Jenkins was shot in the elbow after a basketball game turned violent at Siefert Elementary School. A 28-year-old man was taken into custody the following day.
August 31, 1988	Detroit, Michigan	0	1	1	At Central High School, A 17-year-old male student was shot in the left arm and right leg while he was in one of the hallways in a gang-related shooting.
August 31, 1988	Anderson, South Carolina	1	0	1	35-year-old principal Dennis Ray Hepler was robbed at gunpoint by Kevin Dean Young, William Henry Bell, and John Glenn on the grounds of West Franklin Street Elementary school. Young, 20, fired a fatal shot from the .25-caliber pistol into Dennis' back. After Hepler fell to the ground, Bell fired another shot into his head. In 1989, Young was sentenced to death for the murder, and in 2000 was executed by lethal injection. Bell was also sentenced to death, but the sentence was commuted in 2017 to life with parole. Glenn was convicted of armed robbery and accessory to murder and sentenced to 35 years in prison. A fourth man who acted as the getaway driver, Arthur Ray Jones, pleaded guilty to an accessory charge and was sentenced to 10 years in jail, with all but 7 1/2 months suspended.
September 2, 1988	South Dallas, Texas	0	2	2	Two groups of teens fired handguns at each other across Lincoln High School's parking lot. Caught in the crossfire were 15-year-old Mark Lee and LaSonya Betts, striking Lee in the hip and Betts in the abdomen. A 17-year-old male former student of Lincoln was arrested in connection with the shootings.
September 22, 1988	Chicago, Illinois	5	2	7	After killing 41-year-old John Van Dyke of Lisle, Illinois and 26-year-old Robert Quinn of Franklin Park, Illinois at a nearby auto parts store called Comet Auro Parts, 40-year-old Clem "Clemmie" Henderson entered Moses Montefiore Academy, where he shot and killed the school custodian. Henderson then shot and killed police officer Irma Ruiz and wounded her partner, Greg Jaglowski, as they confronted him. Despite being shot in both legs, Jaglowski managed to return fire, killing Henderson. The last victim includes 34-year-old Arthur Baker, a custodial worker at Montefiore and injured Laplose Chestnut.
September 26, 1988	Greenwood, South Carolina	2	9	11	1988 Oakland Elementary School shooting: 19-year-old James William Wilson entered Oakland Elementary School and started firing shots in the cafeteria, wounding two students and a teacher. After reloading his gun in a girls' restroom, he was confronted by teacher Kat Finkbeiner, who tried to stop him; she was wounded twice. He then entered a third-grade classroom and shot toward the students, killing eight-year-old Shequila Tawoon Bradley and Tequila Maria Thomas and wounding five others. Wilson was convicted of murder and sentenced to death.
October 3, 1988	Mascotte, Florida	0	1	1	9-year-old Leah Wilbanks was shot twice by an unknown gunman at Mascotte Elementary School during P.E. class from behind the school fence. The shooter fled and was never arrested.
October 4, 1988	Jacksonville, Florida	0	5	5	Eight teachers, 20 students, and 13 cheerleaders were leaving Ribault Junior High School after a football game when their bus was pelted with gunfire and rocks. The bullets and rocks struck the bus on the drivers side, with the bullets penetrating all the way through the bus. Five girls suffered minor injuries from broken glass.
October 4, 1988	Baton Rouge, Louisiana	0	0	0	33-year-old Evelena B. Moore, a special-education teacher at Galvez Elementary, opened fire on cafeteria worker Beatrice Hills in the school's parking lot. Hills was not injured. Police arrested Moore and charged her with attempted second-degree murder. Moore was back at work the next day. Superintendent Ralph Ricardo said that the school board had no provisions to dismiss a teacher charged with attempted murder, and therefore Moore was allowed remain on the job until pleading guilty or being convicted of the charge.
October 5, 1988	Baltimore, Maryland	0	1	1	In the Southwestern Senior High School 1st floor hallway, a 17-year-old boy fired a shot at someone but missed and hit a 15-year-old girl.
October 6, 1988	Mobile, Alabama	0	1	1	Arilyn Jean Lelande, 29, invaded 35-year-old teacher Angela Jean Brown's sixth-grade classroom, pointed a handgun at the children and told them to move back. Lelande, Brown's sister, demanded money from Brown before firing several shots at her, hitting her at least once in the abdomen and leaving her in serious condition. Lelande was arrested and charged with first-degree assault.
October 9, 1988	Sacramento, California	1	0	1	15-year-old Serrocko James Henry, a Sacramento High School sophomore, and 12-year-olds Edell Story, Jerry Wilson, and DeVon Johnson-Curry were taking turns using a baseball bat to smash windows at the school, tripping the school's alarm. Police arrived and encountered the children in a dimly lit hallway, Story still carrying a baseball bat. Henry was shot in the chest and killed. The other three boys were detained for questioning and then released to their parents. The sheriff declared the shooting a justifiable homicide.
November 22, 1988	Abilene, Texas	0	1	1	16-year-old student Mason Staggs shot Cooper High School teacher Rick Maloney in the face with a pistol, severely injuring him. Staggs surrendered to police two hours later, pleaded guilty and was sentenced to 14 years in prison.
December 16, 1988	Virginia Beach, Virginia	1	1	2	At Atlantic Shores Christian School, 16-year-old student Nicholas Elliott shot two teachers with a Mac-10 9-millimeter machine pistol, killing 41-year-old Karen Farley and critically wounding 37-year-old Sam Marino, then began firing on a classroom full of students before the gun jammed; no students were hit. He was sentenced to life plus 114 years in prison with 15 years before parole.
1989
January 17, 1989	Stockton, California	6	32	38	Stockton schoolyard shooting: 24-year-old Patrick Edward Purdy fatally shot five children and wounded 32 others at the Cleveland Elementary School before taking his own life. The victims were children of refugees from Southeast Asia. Purdy had a history of violence, alcoholism and drug addiction, and criminality.
February 10, 1989	Kearns, Utah	0	0	0	At Thomas Jefferson Junior High School, a 12-year-old boy fired a handgun at a vice principal, William Crumbaugh. No one was injured.
February 23, 1989	Chester Township, Ohio	0	0	0	A 16-year-old West Geauga High School student accidentally fired a shot on a school bus carrying over 20 students.
September 19, 1989	Kalihi-Palama, Hawaii	1	0	1	A gang-related shooting at Farrington High School left 18-year-old Edilberto Asuncion dead in the parking lot. Primary shooter Efron Renon was convicted of Convicted as the principal shooter of attempted murder in the first degree, murder in the second degree, and carrying a firearm on his person without a license and the secondary shooter Renato Paet was convicted accomplice to murder in the second degree.
December 5, 1989	McKeesport, Pennsylvania	1	1	2	While riding the school bus, 16-year-old Serra Catholic High School student Robert Butler shot 16-year-old schoolmate Adam Ference in the back of the head before fatally shooting himself. Ference was in critical condition but survived.

=== 1990s ===
160 incidents.

Date	Location	Deaths	Injuries	Total	Description
1990
January 11, 1990	Newport News, Virginia	0	2	2	Two shooters fired at three people near Huntington Middle School. Stray rounds hit two students inside the school.
February 13, 1990	Batesburg-Leesville, South Carolina	0	0	0	A 15-year-old student fired a shot on the playground of Batesburg-Leesville Middle School. He was disarmed.
March 27, 1990	Brooklyn, New York	0	1	1	A black youth was taunted with racial slurs by three white youths in the stairwell of a public school in the Bensonhurst area of Brooklyn. A 14-year-old was then shot and slightly wounded because he had acted as peacemaker when the same boys clashed with another black teen the month before.
April 23, 1990	Jacksonville, Florida	0	0	0	A student fired two shots inside a classroom at Mayport Junior High School but was disarmed by a visiting parent.
May 1, 1990	Tallahassee, Florida	0	0	0	At least five shots were fired at students outside on the playground at Fairview Middle School.
May 15, 1990	Bozeman, Montana	2	0	2	19-year-old Montana State University student Brett Byers entered the dorm room of James Clevenger and Brian Boeder, both also 19, while they were sleeping and fatally shot both of them with a sawed-off shotgun. He was convicted of two counts of deliberate homicide and sentenced to 165 years in prison. Byers was denied parole in 2007, 2015, and 2020.
August 26, 1990	Sunrise Manor, Nevada	1	0	1	Minutes before the first bell on the first day of school at Eldorado High School in Las Vegas, 15-year-old Curtis Collins shot 16-year-old Donnie Lee Bolden Jr. in the neck, killing him in the crowded high school cafeteria. Collins was released from prison in 2005 on permanent parole.
September 11, 1990	San Antonio, Texas	0	3	3	Three students were wounded when gang-related gunfire broke out at Sam Houston High School. 17-year-old John Campbell was wounded in the right foot, 18-year-old Larry Johnson was wounded in the right thigh and calf, and a 16-year-old received a chest wound. 18-year-old Kenneth Wolford and two other male students were arrested and charged.
September 21, 1990	Indianapolis, Indiana	0	3	3	A 13-year-old girl was shot in the head while riding the school bus to John Marshall Junior High School. Two other students were injured by flying glass.
October 31, 1990	Durham, North Carolina	0	0	0	A 13-year-old student was arrested after he fired a shot on the grounds of Brogden Middle School.
1991
April 23, 1991	Compton, California	1	0	1	A teenager fired a handgun at a security guard who had chased him and three friends off the grounds of Ralph J. Bunche Middle School. He missed and killed 11-year-old student bystander Alejandro Vargas.
May 1991	Grand Prairie, Texas	0	0	0	A student fired several shots into a door at the principal's office of Andrew Jackson Middle School.
May 16, 1991	Kansas City, Kansas	0	2	2	A boy and girl were injured when a teenage boy fired a gun toward a crowd in the Coronado Middle School cafeteria. Police said the shooting was gang-related.
September 18, 1991	Crosby, Texas	1	0	1	17-year-old Arthur Jermel Jack was killed by 15-year-old LaKeeta Cadoree in the cafeteria at Crosby High School.
September 18, 1991	Austin, Texas	0	0	0	A student at the University of Texas at Austin attempted to kill university president William Cunningham, but was disarmed during a struggle in which a shot was fired.
November 1, 1991	Iowa City, Iowa	6	1	7	1991 University of Iowa shooting: 28-year-old former graduate student Gang Lu killed four members of the University of Iowa's faculty and a research student and seriously wounded another student. 47-year-old professor of physics and astronomy Christoph K. Goertz, 45-year-old associate professor of physics and astronomy Robert Alan Smith, 44-year-old chairman of the physics and astronomy department Dwight R. Nicholson, 56-year-old associate vice president for academic affairs Dr. Theresa Anne Cleary were shot in the head and died the following day, and 27-year-old research investigator in physics and astronomy Dr. Shan Linhua. 23-year-old Miya Rodolfo-Sioson, Dr. Cleary's temporary student receptionist in the grievance office, survived but was left paralyzed from the neck down. Lu then shot himself in the head and died shortly after police arrived.
November 5, 1991	Port Huron, Michigan	0	1	1	A 13-year-old student fired at a classmate at Holland Woods Intermediate School, wounding a bystander.
November 25, 1991	Brooklyn, New York	1	1	2	During an argument between two teens at Thomas Jefferson High School, three shots were fired and a stray bullet killed a third, uninvolved 16-year-old student. Teacher Robert Anderson, who was approaching to intervene, was critically wounded. 14-year-old shooter Jason Bentley was sentenced to three to nine years in prison.
1992
January 27, 1992	Jacksonville, Florida	0	0	0	A student fired a shot into the ceiling at Fort Caroline Middle School and was arrested.
January 29, 1992	Kent, Ohio	0	1	1	26-year-old graduate student Sarah Smith was shot and wounded in the chest as she was waiting for her husband to pick her up at Kent State University.
January 29, 1992	Jacksonville, Florida	0	2	2	16-year-old Gerald Smith shot and wounded two 19-year-old students after an argument at William M. Raines High School.
February 26, 1992	Brooklyn, New York	2	0	2	Thomas Jefferson High School second shooting: 15-year-old Kahlil Sumpter killed students Tyrone Sinkler, 16 and Ian Moore, 17 in the school's second-floor hallway. In 1993, he was sentenced to 6 2/3 to 20 years in prison. He was released on parole in 1998.
March 5, 1992	Obetz, Ohio	0	1	1	At Hamilton Middle School, 12-year-old Gordon W. Dye Jr. shot his bully, 14-year-old Gregg Johnson, in the head with a .22-caliber pistol in the school cafeteria. Johnson survived, and Dye was released to his parents and put on house arrest.
March 9, 1992	Lancaster, Pennsylvania	1	0	1	At Carter MacRae Elementary School, 13-year-old student Ricardo Cruz fired a handgun at another classmate but missed and accidentally shot and killed 18-year-old Debbie Rivera. Cruz was sentenced to life without parole for the shooting but was resentenced in 2017 to 25 years to life and was immediately paroled.
March 13, 1992	Oxon Hill, Maryland	0	0	0	A student fired a shot at another teenager inside Potomac High School.
March 31, 1992	Algiers, Louisiana	1	0	1	15-year-old Jomo-Kenyetta Joseph was shot in the head and killed at O. Perry Walker High School during an early morning scuffle involving 10 boys from two rival neighborhoods. Herman Tureau, 15, fired the fatal shot and was sentenced to life in prison without parole but was resentenced and paroled.
April 23, 1992	Bloomington, Indiana	3	0	3	Indiana University graduate student Susan Clements was shot to death in her dorm by a former boyfriend before he committed suicide. A friend who attempted to intervene, Steven Molen, was also shot and critically injured; he died several days later.
May 1, 1992	Olivehurst, California	4	10	14	1992 Lindhurst High School shooting: Former student 20-year-old Eric Houston killed three students and a teacher, and wounded nine students and another teacher before surrendering to police. Houston was later sentenced to death and remains on California's death row.
September 11, 1992	Amarillo, Texas	0	7	7	Following a pep rally at Palo Duro High School, 17-year-old Randy Earl Matthews shot and wounded seven students with a .22-caliber pistol. Matthews had attended the school for nine days when the incident occurred and was believed to have been bullied at his previous school. Matthews was charged with one count of attempted murder, five counts of aggravated assault, and one count of unlawfully carrying a weapon onto school grounds. He was convicted and served eight years.
September 18, 1992	Houston, Texas	0	2	2	Calvin Bell, the parent of a student at Piney Point Elementary School, began shooting inside the school office when he was told his son was being held back. He shot and wounded two responding police officers before his gun jammed and he surrendered.
October 19, 1992	The Bronx, New York	0	3	3	Two 14-year-old girls and a 16-year-old boy were shot outside a Bronx high school, the apparent result of a dispute between the gunman and the boy. The girls were bystanders.
November 4, 1992	Detroit, Michigan	0	6	6	Six students at Finney High School were grazed by buckshot after three ski-masked gunmen opened fire in a crowded hallway.
November 4, 1992	Detroit, Michigan	0	3	3	A 14-year-old was in custody for shooting three Foch Middle School students as they passed by the Marcus Garvey Academy.
November 4, 1992	Detroit, Michigan	0	1	1	In the third school shooting of the day in Detroit, 16-year-old DeWayne Boyd was hit in the chest when shots were fired at two Mumford High School students, one of which escaped injury after a bullet struck the student's wallet.
November 20, 1992	Chicago, Illinois	1	2	3	15-year-old freshman DeLondyn Lawson of Tilden High School was shot to death in a hallway on the school's second floor by 16-year-old student Joseph White. The shooting was ruled gang-related. In addition to killing Lawson, White, a documented gang member, wounded two other students.
December 14, 1992	Great Barrington, Massachusetts	2	4	6	1992 Bard College at Simon's Rock shooting: Wayne Lo, a Taiwanese-born American, opened fire at Bard College at Simon's Rock. He killed student Galen Gibson and Spanish professor Ñacuñán Sáez, also wounding four people. Lo was sentenced to life in prison without parole for the murders.
1993
January 6, 1993	Brentwood, New York	0	1	1	Former student Matthew Hunter was shot and wounded by two gunmen during a basketball game between Brentwood High School and Sachem High School over a dispute about the theft of a gold chain.
January 6, 1993	Washington, Pennsylvania	0	0	0	An 18-year-old man accidentally fired a handgun during a basketball game at Washington High School.
January 18, 1993	Grayson, Kentucky	2	0	2	1993 East Carter High School shooting: 17-year-old Scott Pennington, a student at East Carter High School, fatally shot his 48-year-old English teacher, Deanna McDavid, and 52-year-old head custodian Marvin Hicks. Pennington was sentenced to life in prison without parole for 25 years.
January 21, 1993	Los Angeles, California	1	1	2	A Fairfax High School student who brought a handgun to school to protect himself accidentally fired the weapon, killing 16-year-old Demetrius Rice and wounding another teenager.
February 2, 1993	Palmdale, California	0	0	0	A teenage shooter fired multiple shots at Juniper Middle School.
February 11, 1993	Fort Worth, Texas	0	0	0	A 14-year-old suspended from William James Middle School shot at substitute teacher Mary Pierce, but missed. The gun jammed when he tried to shoot again, causing him to flee; he was later arrested.
February 19, 1993	Beech Grove, Indiana	0	0	0	A 15-year-old student at Beech Grove Middle School fired a shot in the air inside the school cafeteria.
February 22, 1993	Reseda, California	1	0	1	15-year-old Robert Heard fatally shot 17-year-old Michael Shean Ensley in the corridor of Reseda High School's science building. Released in 2011 and re-arrested for his wife's murder in 2012.
February 24, 1993	Milford, Michigan	0	1	1	A person fired at two school buses, striking one. An 8-year-old was injured by shattered glass.
March 9, 1993	Gahanna, Ohio	0	0	0	16-year-old Cornell Stewart fired shots into the ceiling of Gahanna Lincoln High School's cafeteria, then brandished his gun at people nearby before fleeing and being arrested. 16-year-old Eric Williams also fired a gun into the ground during the same incident.
March 15, 1993	Gastonia, North Carolina	0	0	0	A 17-year-old non-student fired a shot in the air in the parking lot of Hunter Huss High School.
April 12, 1993	Oklahoma City, Oklahoma	0	0	0	A man fired from a car at students entering Northwest Classen High School. One round went through a hallway and impacted a classroom door.
April 15, 1993	Acushnet, Massachusetts	1	0	1	44-year-old David Taber entered Ford Middle School and took three hostages. During the hostage crisis, Taber killed school nurse Carol Day. Taber was found not guilty of the murder by reason of insanity. Released in 2015. re-arrested in 2017 for assaulting his father.
May 4, 1993	Des Moines, Iowa	0	0	0	A high school student fired shots during a fight outside Callanan Middle School after classes had been dismissed, but while students were still in the area.
May 14, 1993	Irving, Texas	1	0	1	17-year-old Max Alexander Martinez shot and killed 17-year-old Jose Balderas with a .38-caliber revolver in a hallway in Nimitz High School during a dispute over girls. Martinez was sentenced to life in prison and was eligible for parole in 2008 but remains incarcerated as of 2020.
May 24, 1993	Pennsburg, Pennsylvania	1	0	1	15-year-old student Jason Smith killed 16-year-old Michael Swann, another student who had bullied him at Upper Perkiomen High School. He was charged as an adult and sentenced to between 12 and 25 years in prison.
May 24, 1993	Fort Lauderdale, Florida	0	0	0	According to police, a 20-year-old man trespassed on the campus of Dillard High School and shot at a student near the cafeteria, but missed.
May 26, 1993	Memphis, Tennessee	0	0	0	A non-student shot at a teacher at Melrose High School, missing him.
May 27, 1993	Memphis, Tennessee	0	1	1	At Melrose High School, the same suspect from the previous day shot and wounded an 18-year-old student.
May 27, 1993	St. Claude, Louisiana	1	0	1	17-year-old Shon Williams fired 10 shots in the Frederick A. Douglass High School schoolyard, killing 15-year-old student Gerald Dordain. He was originally sentenced to life in prison without parole but has now been resentenced and released.
July 8, 1993	Ogden, Utah	1	3	4	Student Mark Duong, a senior at Weber State University, opened fire with a semi-automatic handgun at a grievance hearing. Duong wounded three, including a police officer; the officer returned fire and killed Duong. Duong was attending the grievance hearing due to an accusation of sexual harassment by a female classmate.
August 31, 1993	Santa Cruz County, California	0	0	0	A 16-year-old shot at a school bus carrying Aptos High School students.
September 1, 1993	White Pigeon Township, Michigan	0	0	0	A 21-year-old man fired shots into a school bus operated by White Pigeon Community Schools.
September 2, 1993	Junction City, Kansas	0	1	1	A 15-year-old boy fired a gun at a male student in the cafeteria after an argument between the two. A 14-year-old girl who was not involved in the fight was non-fatally struck in the head.
September 3, 1993	Houston, Mississippi	0	0	0	Two 16-year-olds fired shots at a football game hosted by Houston High School.
September 7, 1993	Los Angeles, California	0	1	1	A 15-year-old non-student bystander was shot and wounded on the first day of classes during a fight at Susan Miller Dorsey High School.
September 7, 1993	Jefferson County, Kentucky	0	0	0	An 11-year-old Newburg Middle School student pointed a gun at other students aboard a school bus before firing a shot out of the window.
September 7, 1993	Roxboro, North Carolina	0	0	0	A 16-year-old Southern Middle School student fired a gun in the air outside the school.
September 7, 1993	Plainview, Texas	0	2	2	Two students were wounded in the parking lot at Plainfield High School.
September 17, 1993	Darien, Illinois	1	0	1	15-year-old Phillip Powell killed 17-year-old Barrett Modisette at the Hinsdale South High School parking lot. Powell, a self-described gang member, was tried as an adult and sentenced to 37 years in prison.
September 17, 1993	Sheridan, Wyoming	1	4	5	29-year-old Kevin Newman opened fire with a 9mm Ruger P85 handgun on a group of 30 middle schoolers on a soccer field outside Central Junior High School. Newman fired 23 shots and wounded four students before committing suicide. A suicide note left by Newman indicated extreme mental disturbance and his belief that he was an "evil person". He had been discharged from the Navy 10 days earlier and had a history of misdemeanor offenses.
September 21, 1993	Lawndale, California	0	1	1	A 17-year-old Leuzinger High School student was shot and wounded by alleged gang members outside the school.
October 15, 1993	Rocky Mount, North Carolina	0	0	0	Two shots were fired at a school bus carrying Northern Nash High School students, one striking the vehicle.
October 18, 1993	Gadsden, Alabama	0	0	0	A gang-related shooting occurred at Emma Sanson High School.
October 19, 1993	Mount Olive, North Carolina	0	2	2	A 12-year-old student fired a gun at Mount Olive Middle School, causing superficial injuries to two classmates.
November 4, 1993	New Britain, Connecticut	1	0	1	18-year-old Miguel DeJesus was shot and killed on the steps of New Britain High School. Rival gang members, 24-year-old Maurice Flanagan and 23-year-old Thomas Mejia, were convicted and sentenced to 15 years in prison.
November 4, 1993	Covert Township, Michigan	0	0	0	Several teenagers pointed a gun at students outside Covert High School and fired shots on school property.
November 8, 1993	Siler City, North Carolina	0	0	0	A gun was accidentally fired inside a classroom at Chatham Middle School.
November 11, 1993	Grand Rapids, Michigan	0	0	0	A 13-year-old Northeast Middle School student accidentally fired a shot during dismissal.
November 11, 1993	Cleveland, Ohio	0	0	0	A 17-year-old East Technical High School student fired shots inside the cafeteria in a gang-related shooting.
November 12, 1993	McComb, Mississippi	0	0	0	Two McComb High School students fired a revolver in the school parking lot.
November 24, 1993	Fort Lauderdale, Florida	0	0	0	17-year-old Dillard High School student Marvin Jones fired a shot at an assistant principal after she suspended him. He fled the scene and was later arrested.
December 1, 1993	Wauwatosa, Wisconsin	1	0	1	21-year-old former student Leonard D. McDowell shot 46-year-old associate principal Dale Breitlow three times in a hallway of Wauwatosa West High School. McDowell was found guilty of the murder and was sentenced to life in prison. His sentence was upheld by the state Court of Appeals in April 1997.
December 8, 1993	Long Beach, California	0	1	1	16-year-old Carrell Burgess was shot in the knee by a 17-year-old outside Woodrow Wilson Classical High School.
December 11, 1993	Springfield, Massachusetts	0	0	0	A 15-year-old Springfield Central High School student accidentally fired a shot in a hallway.
December 15, 1993	Los Angeles, California	0	1	1	A 17-year-old student was shot and wounded outside Chatsworth High School by two robbers after he refused to give them his backpack.
December 17, 1993	Chelsea, Michigan	1	2	3	Stephen Leith, a disgruntled Chelsea High School teacher, shot and killed the school district's superintendent and wounded a principal and another teacher. Leith was sentenced to life without parole.
December 17, 1993	Roselle, New Jersey	0	0	0	A 20-year-old man fired a shot at other people outside Abraham Clark High School shortly after classes were dismissed.
1994
January 24, 1994	Columbia, South Carolina	1	0	1	18-year-old Floyd Eugene Brown shot fellow Eau Claire High School student 17-year-old Earnest Dunlap following an argument the week before. Brown was arrested shortly after at his home. A jury later acquitted Brown of murder.
January 31, 1994	Blue Ridge, Washington	1	0	1	24-year-old Darrell Cloud, a former student at Whitman Middle School in North Seattle, Washington killed 45-year-old teacher Neal Summers, who had sexually abused Cloud since he was 13. Cloud served nine years in prison. He later received a $250,000 settlement in a civil suit against Seattle Schools, charging that Summers had not been adequately supervised.
February 7, 1994	Fort Myers, Florida	2	0	2	48-year-old former Cypress Lake Middle School special ed teacher Larry Ray Shelton went to the Lee County School District office to talk with superintendent 57-year-old James A. Adams, then shot Adams six times with a .38-caliber handgun, killing him. Larry then left the building, walked to a nearby parking lot and committed suicide.
February 8, 1994	Osborn, Michigan	1	0	1	In the student parking lot of Osborn High School, 19-year-old special ed student Steven Watkins was shot in his car by an unknown assailant and died from his injuries.
February 10, 1994	Forward Township, Pennsylvania	0	1	1	A bullied student fired a shot aboard a school bus, then chased a 14-year-old boy outside the bus and shot him in the arm.
February 14, 1994	Belmont, California	1	0	1	At Carlmont High School Edwin Sims, 15, and Gile W., 15, were arguing about who had the bigger gun when Sims pulled out a BB gun while Gile W. pulled out a real gun and killed Edwin. The boys had a history of feuds with one another.
February 18, 1994	Spartanburg, South Carolina	0	1	1	24-year-old Roosevelt Johnson was shot in the leg after a basketball game at Spartanburg High School.
March 1, 1994	Boonville, Missouri	2	0	2	33-year-old Dante D. Hayes, hunter and ex-convict, killed 58-year-old cafeteria manager Richard Vancena and 33-year-old cook Robin Michelle Coleman in the mess hall of Kemper Military School and College. Hayes was drunk and looking for his wife Anna, with whom he had had a fight the night before. No students were harmed. Hayes was later convicted of two counts of murder and sentenced to life without parole.
March 3, 1994	Ensley, Alabama	0	1	1	At Ensley High School, Disciples gang member Walter Westbrook II, 17 years old, shot 15-year-old Andre Allen, a member of the Crips. Allen survived, but Westbrook was convicted of attempted murder and sentenced to 20 years in prison.
March 9, 1994	Washington, D.C.	0	1	1	At Eastern High School, 17-year-old Cornell Andrew Cheeks Jr. shot 17-year-old Jeremy Cook. Cheeks fled the school and turned himself in to police. Cook survived his injuries.
March 15, 1994	Goose Creek, South Carolina	1	2	3	While watching a fistfight between students after class at Goose Creek High School, 18-year-old Michael Ryan Spann was shot and killed by a student who attended another school and two other individuals were injured. .
March 23, 1994	Ballard, Washington	1	1	2	At Ballard High School during a drive-by shooting, 16-year-old Melissa Fernandez was fatally shot and a 16-year-old male student received minor injuries. The shooting was believed to be gang-related. Later in the year, police arrested Brian Ronquillo, 16, and Cesar Sarausad, 19, for the shooting. Brian, the trigger man, was convicted of first degree murder and was sentenced to 52 years in prison; Cesar, who drove the car, was convicted of second degree murder and was sentenced to more than 27 years in prison. Both men have since been released from prison.
April 5, 1994	Austin, Texas	0	2	2	At McNeil High School, a student brought a 9mm pistol to the school and showed it off to a classmate. As he did the gun fired, shot through a wall and injured two students. Three 16-year-old boys were arrested for the incident.
April 8, 1994	Upper Marlboro, Maryland	0	1	1	At Largo High School, 45-year-old arts teacher Barrington Miles was shot in the chest in the boys' restroom by 17-year-old student Warren Emmanuel Graham. Graham had stolen a 9mm semiautomatic Beretta pistol from his police officer father that morning in an attempt to sell it to students. He fled the school and was arrested at a friend's house. Graham was convicted in adult court of intent to murder, possession of a firearm on school property and use of a firearm in the commission of a felony.
April 12, 1994	Butte, Montana	1	0	1	10-year-old James Osmanson, teased because his parents had AIDS, brought a gun to school and tried to shoot his bully but missed and killed another student, 11-year-old Jeremy Bullock, on the playground of Margaret Leary Elementary School. Osmanson was sent to a private residential treatment center. In 2016, James Osmanson, whose name had changed at that point, was convicted of possessing child pornography and given probation.
April 19, 1994	Washington, D.C.	1	0	1	At Eliot Junior High School, 21-year-old Louis Edward Lehear was shot to death. the murder was never solved.
April 21, 1994	Nashville, Tennessee	1	0	1	14-year-old Jeremy Bryant accidentally shot and killed 13-year-old Terrence Murray at J.T. Moore Middle School with a revolver a friend let him hold.
April 21, 1994	North Miami, Florida	1	0	1	At North Miami High School, 18-year-old Tyhno Rock was showing his friends a .380-caliber semiautomatic pistol at lunch, then accidentally fired at 18-year-old Edvard Alvonor's chest; Alvonor died two days later.
July 21, 1994	Ardmore, Pennsylvania	1	0	1	At the Ardmore Child Care Center, 40-year-old teacher Diane Morse was killed by her former friend, 36-year-old Arcelia Trumaine Stoval, who had a history of mental illness. Stoval was convicted of first degree murder and is serving a life sentence.
July 24, 1994	Manchester, Pennsylvania	1	0	1	A feud between Scott Walker, 15, and Randy Hawkins, 19, climaxed when Walker shot Hawkins to death on the Manchester Elementary School basketball court. Walker was originally sentenced to life without parole for the shooting, but was resentenced on April 26, 2018, to 35 years to life.
July 25, 1994	Ottumwa, Iowa	1	0	1	At Ottumwa High School, 16-year-old Michael Coffman shot and killed 15-year-old Jeramy Wayne Allen after the two boys argued earlier that day. Coffman was originally sentenced to life without parole for the shooting, but was resentenced in February 2017 to life in prison with chance of parole.
October 5, 1994	Folsom, Louisiana	0	0	0	A 13-year-old Folsom Junior High School student fired shots from a .22-caliber pistol and waved his gun around on school grounds before being subdued and arrested.
October 12, 1994	Greensboro, North Carolina	1	1	2	After being suspended for smoking, 16-year-old Nicholas Atkinson returned to Grimsley High School with a 9mm pistol. After wounding assistant principal Bill Whites, Atkinson took his own life.
October 17, 1994	Chicago, Illinois	0	1	1	A 16-year-old female student was accidentally shot in the thigh outside Hubbard High School when a teenage boy who lived in the neighborhood rode past on a bicycle and fired into a crowd. It is believed the shooting was meant for rival gang members.
November 7, 1994	Wickliffe, Ohio	1	4	5	1994 Wickliffe Middle School shooting: 37-year-old former student Keith A. Ledeger killed 41-year-old custodian Pete Christopher at Wickliffe Middle School and wounded 47-year-old assistant principal Jim Anderson, 47-year-old police officer Thomas Schmidt, and 50-year-old teacher Lowell Grimm. He then exchanged shots with police before being injured and taken into custody. Ledeger was sentenced to 57 years in prison and died in prison of natural causes in 2011.
December 14, 1994	Albany, New York	0	1	1	Ralph J. Tortorici, 26, military veteran and psychology major at the State University of New York at Albany, held a large lecture hall full of students hostage. Tortorici, armed with a .270-caliber rifle with more than two dozen rounds of ammunition and a hunting knife, walked into the ancient history class of Hans Pohlsander, saying, "Don't worry. Nobody move. You guys are getting held hostage." The standoff ended when Tortorici had his gun taken away by 19-year-old student Jason McEnaney, who was shot in the leg, groin, and abdomen in the exchange. Tortorici, who suffered from a well-documented history of mental illness, argued during the hostage crisis that the government had implanted a control chip in his head during a procedure at Albany Medical Center. He committed suicide in 1999 in prison while serving a 15 1/2-year sentence.
1995
January 6, 1995	Washington, D.C.	1	0	1	16-year-old Antar A. Hall, a sophomore at Cardozo High School, was fatally shot at an entrance to the school, allegedly by a 14-year-old freshman with whom he had been arguing.
January 12, 1995	Seattle, Washington	0	2	2	A 15-year-old student at Garfield High School left school during the day and returned with his grandfather's handgun. He wounded two students.
January 26, 1995	Chapel Hill, North Carolina	2	2	4	Wendell Williamson, A 26-year-old law student shot four people, two fatally, on and near the University of North Carolina at Chapel Hill campus. Williamson was found Not Guilty by Reason of Insanity.
January 30, 1995	Pleasant Grove, Texas	0	0	0	A 13-year-old Fred F. Florence Middle School student fired a handgun repeatedly inside the school before barricading himself in a room for almost two hours. He was arrested.
February 8, 1995	Chadron, Nebraska	0	1	1	A 7th-grade student walked into a classroom and shot 35-year-old Andy Pope, a social studies teacher in the upper chest at Chadron Middle School.
March 27, 1995	Detroit, Michigan	0	3	3	At Pershing High School, a student was shot in the hallway. Later the same day, a student was shot in the hallway of Denby High School and a student was shot by the security desk at Redford Union High School. All shootings were initially believed to be gang-related.
August 29, 1995	Laredo, Texas	1	0	1	Armed with a sawed-off shotgun, 12-year-old Jonah Inverson shot and killed 12-year-old Elizabeth Rivera in a restroom at Memorial Middle School. Rivera had allegedly turned down Inverson's request for a date. Iverson was imprisoned until age 21 for his crime.
September 12, 1995	Memphis, Tennessee	1	0	1	At Cypress Junior High School 15-year-old student Torenzo Maurice Bell and his friend jumped Columbus Coffer another 15-year-old student who retaliated with a gun and shot Bell who later died.
September 14, 1995	Olathe, Kansas	2	4	6	During a football game at Olathe North High School, a student from Shawnee Mission North High School drove by and fired at students with a .22-caliber Jennings semiautomatic handgun, killing an Olathe North student and the student's cousin.
September 29, 1995	Tavares, Florida	1	0	1	14-year-old student Keith E. Johnson killed 13-year-old Joey Summerall at Tavares Middle School with a handgun he had stolen from his neighbor's home. He was convicted and sentenced to life in prison without the possibility of parole but has since been resentenced is on community supervision.
October 12, 1995	Blackville, South Carolina	2	1	3	1995 Blackville–Hilda High School shooting: Suspended student 16-year-old Toby R. Sincino killed 56-year-old math teacher Phyllis Senn and wounded 38-year-old math teacher Johnny Thompson before committing suicide at Blackville-Hilda High School.
October 13, 1995	St. Louis, Missouri	0	0	0	A Beaumont High student shot at a school bus that was taking other students to Lindbergh High School after gang signs were exchanged.
November 15, 1995	Lynnville, Tennessee	2	1	3	1995 Richland High School shooting: 17-year-old James Rouse killed student Diane Collins and teacher Carolyn Foster at Richland High School and seriously wounded another teacher with a rifle. Rouse was later sentenced to life in prison without parole.
1996
January 19, 1996	Washington, D.C.	1	0	1	Two masked gunmen killed 14-year-old Damion Blocker in a stairwell at Winston Education Center. One shooter, 16-year-old Darrick Evans, was sentenced to 41 years to life in prison and the other William Arnell Batchelor Jr pled guilty to involuntary manslaughter and received probation.
January 29, 1996	Semmes, Alabama	0	1	1	A 14-year-old Semmes Middle School student opened fire with a pistol, wounding another student.
February 2, 1996	Moses Lake, Washington	3	1	4	1996 Frontier Middle School shooting: 14-year-old Barry Loukaitis killed a teacher and two students and wounded another student when he opened fire on his algebra class.
February 8, 1996	Palo Alto, California	1	1	2	At Mid-Peninsula High School, 16-year-old Douglas Bradley drove onto the basketball court of his Palo Alto high school, tossed a handful of money out of the car window and then opened fire on students who had hurried over to grab the bills. One student was injured; Bradley then committed suicide.
February 22, 1996	Savannah, Georgia	1	0	1	At Jenkins High School, 15-year-old Keith Antwone Green shot and killed 17-year-old Dwayne Cedric Martin and aerved 14 years in prison before being parole in 2011. Green was later sentenced to life without the parole for the murder of his girlfriend.
February 29, 1996	St. Louis, Missouri	2	1	3	30-year-old Mark Boyd hired 23-year-old Malik Nettles to kill 15-year-old Kyunia Taylor as she rode on a school bus to Beaumont High School. Taylor was pregnant with Boyd's child; a baby girl was delivered by emergency caesarean section, but died 23 days later. The bus driver was also shot but survived. Both Boyd and Nettles were convicted of murder. Boyd was sentenced to 26 years while Nettles was sentenced to life without parole.
May 14, 1996	South Jordan, Utah	1	1	2	On a school bus bound for Bingham Middle School, 15-year-old student Justin Allgood shot and wounded the bus driver and started driving the bus himself. He led police on a high-speed chase before crashing into a house. Allgood then committed suicide.
July 26, 1996	Franklin Hills, California	0	2	2	Two students were shot and injured in a stairwell at John Marshall High School.
August 15, 1996	San Diego, California	3	0	3	1996 San Diego State University shooting: At San Diego State University, 36-year-old graduate student Frederick Martin Davidson killed three professors - 32-year-old Chen Liang, 44-year-old D. Preston Lowrey III, and 36-year-old Costas Lyrintzis - whom he believed were involved in a conspiracy against him. Davidson was sentenced to serve three life terms without parole.
September 17, 1996	State College, Pennsylvania	1	2	3	19-year-old Jillian Robbins killed one student and injured two outside Pennsylvania State University's HUB–Robeson Center. Robbins was sentenced to between 30 and 60 years in prison.
September 25, 1996	Decatur, Georgia	1	2	3	16-year-old David Dubose Jr. killed English teacher Horace Morgan on the steps of Dekalb Alternative School. Dubose was found not guilty by reason of insanity and was committed indefinitely to a state mental hospital.
October 9, 1996	Sherwood, Arkansas	1	0	1	14-year-old Willis Ward Johnson killed 20-year-old James Earl Routt as they rode a school bus. He pleaded guilty to first-degree murder and was sentenced to 46 years in prison.
October 16, 1996	West Lafayette, Indiana	2	0	2	18-year-old Jarrod Allan Eskew killed 27-year-old Jay Severson, his Wiley Hall dorm counselor, and himself after being found with drugs the previous day.
1997
January 27, 1997	West Palm Beach, Florida	1	0	1	14-year-old Conniston Middle School student Tronneal Mangum fatally shot 14-year-old classmate John Pierre Kamel over a $40 debt. He was originally sentenced to life in prison, later reduced to 40 years and again to 25 years.
February 19, 1997	Bethel, Alaska	2	2	4	1997 Bethel Regional High School shooting: 16-year-old student Evan Ramsey killed Bethel Regional High School principal Ron Edwards and 15-year-old student Joshua Palacios and wounded two other students. After a brief shootout with a responding police officer, Ramsey surrendered. He was later sentenced to 198 years in prison.
March 17, 1997	Detroit, Michigan	1	0	1	Kenny Baumgart, 16, was shot and killed by 16-year-old Darrell Hagerman while walking away from a dispute in the Pershing High School parking lot. Hagerman was convicted of second degree murder and a weapons charge, and sentenced to 25 to 50 years in prison. He was released March 30, 2022.
October 1, 1997	Pearl, Mississippi	3	7	10	1997 Pearl High School shooting: 16-year-old Luke Woodham murdered his 50-year-old mother, Mary, at home before killing his ex-girlfriend, 16-year-old student Christina Menefee, and 17-year-old student Lydia Kaye Dew, then wounding seven others at Pearl High School. Woodham was sentenced to life in prison.
October 15, 1997	Palmetto, Florida	0	1	1	After an argument between them the day before, 13-year-old Brandon Hartsoe took a .38 revolver from his mother's dresser drawer and shot 13-year-old Lincoln Middle School classmate Trent Murray in the back, causing serious injury, then continued to fire three more shots in the general area of other students. Hartsoe was sentenced in 1998 to serve until his 18th birthday.
December 1, 1997	West Paducah, Kentucky	3	5	8	1997 Heath High School shooting: Three students were killed and five wounded by 14-year-old Michael Carneal as they participated in a prayer circle. Carneal was sentenced to life in prison with the possibility of parole after 25 years.
December 15, 1997	Stamps, Arkansas	0	2	2	Concealed in a wooded area on school grounds, 14-year-old Joseph "Colt" Todd wounded two students as they were entering Stamps High School.
1998
March 24, 1998	Craighead County, Arkansas	5	10	15	1998 Westside Middle School shooting: 13-year-old Mitchell Johnson and 11-year-old Andrew Golden killed a teacher and four students and wounded 10 others as Westside Middle School emptied during a fire alarm intentionally set off by Golden. Both shooters were sentenced to confinement until their 21st birthdays.
March 25, 1998	Daly City, California	0	0	0	A 13-year-old student brought a .25-caliber handgun to Fernando Riviera Intermediate School and fired one shot at the school principal who was inside the courtyard, hitting a wall about 20 feet away from him. The shooter quickly ditched the gun and calmly walked to his math class, and was arrested. He told police he was not aware of the Jonesboro, Arkansas school shooting one day prior, which was on the mind of students, teachers, and parents of students. The shooting was motivated by the boy being angry by being sent home.
April 8, 1998	Twin Falls, Idaho	0	0	0	A man fired shots at Sawtooth Elementary School as he drove by.
April 9, 1998	Pocatello, Idaho	0	0	0	14-year-old Mitchell Gushwa, armed with two handguns, took hostages at The Alternate School, firing a shot into the ceiling as he did so. After trading his handguns to police in exchange for food, he surrendered.
April 15, 1998	Grand Terrace, California	0	0	0	A 15-year-old student armed with a semi-automatic handgun fired shots inside a classroom at The Advocate School, a school for special needs students. He was subdued by staff and arrested.
April 24, 1998	Edinboro, Pennsylvania	1	3	4	1998 Parker Middle School dance shooting: 14-year-old student Andrew Wurst fatally shot 48-year-old teacher John Gillette and wounded two students and another teacher at an 8th-grade graduation dance. He is serving a 30- to 60-year sentence in a prison for young offenders.
May 19, 1998	Fayetteville, Tennessee	1	0	1	18-year-old Jacob Lee Davis shot 18-year-old Robert Creson at Lincoln County High School in a dispute over a girl. Davis received a life sentence on July 29, 1999, and will be eligible for parole in May 19, 2049.
May 21, 1998	Springfield, Oregon	4	25	29	1998 Thurston High School shooting: After killing his parents at home, 15-year-old Kip Kinkel drove to Thurston High School, where he killed two students and wounded 25 others. After pleading guilty, he was sentenced to 111 years in prison.
June 15, 1998	Richmond, Virginia	0	2	2	14-year-old student Quinshawn Brooker wounded 45-year-old basketball coach and history teacher Gregory Carter and 74-year-old Head Start volunteer Eloise Wilson in the hallway of Armstrong High School.
September 29, 1998	North Miami, Florida	0	3	3	Two teenagers shot and wounded three people at North Miami Senior High School before fleeing.
December 10, 1998	Detroit, Michigan	1	0	1	52-year-old Professor Andrzej Olbrot was killed by 48-year-old graduate doctoral student Wlodzimierz Dedecjusat at Wayne State University. Dedecjusat was sentenced to life in prison.
1999
January 8, 1999	Carrollton, Georgia	2	0	2	15-year-old Andrea Garrett was found dead and 17-year-old Jeff Miller seriously wounded in the girls' restroom at Central High School as part of a suspected suicide pact. Miller died the next day.
April 16, 1999	Notus, Idaho	0	1	1	15-year-old Shawn Cooper of Notus, Idaho took a 12-gauge shot gun to school and started firing, injuring one student and holding the school hostage for about 20 minutes.
April 20, 1999	Columbine, Colorado	16 (Note: Including a victim who died in 2025.)	23	39	Columbine High School massacre: 18-year-old Eric Harris and 17-year-old Dylan Klebold, students at Columbine High School, killed 12 students and one teacher. They injured 21 additional people, and three more were injured while attempting to escape the school. The pair committed suicide in the library after a brief gunfight with police at the end of the massacre. It was the deadliest mass shooting at a high school in U.S. history until it was surpassed by the Stoneman Douglas High School shooting in February 2018.
May 20, 1999	Conyers, Georgia	0	6	6	15-year-old student Thomas "T.J." Solomon Jr. wounded six students at Heritage High School. A 15-year-old girl was hospitalized in critical condition, and the other victims suffered from non-life-threatening injuries. Solomon initially faced up to 351 years of prison if convicted of aggravated assault and other charges. In 2000, he was found guilty but mentally ill and was sentenced to 40 years in prison and 65 years of probation. Paroled in 2016.
November 19, 1999	Deming, New Mexico	1	0	1	13-year-old Victor Cordova Jr. fatally shot 13-year-old Deming Middle School schoolmate Araceli Tena. Cordova said he had intended to commit suicide but was jostled by others and his gun moved. He could not be charged as an adult as he was under 14, so he received the maximum sentence for a juvenile: a minimum of two years in prison, with a maximum of being held until his 21st birthday. In December 2003, he was released to his aunt and uncle to live with them in Colorado.
December 6, 1999	Fort Gibson, Oklahoma	0	6	6	13-year-old Seth Trickey opened fire in the courtyard of his middle school using a gun brought from home. While there were no fatalities, several students felt sparks from the bullets hitting the building walls. Five were injured, including a girl who was shot in the face. He was tried as a juvenile and released in March 2005.

Total number of 20th century incidents listed here: 544

== See also ==
- Enoch Brown school massacre (1764), the earliest school shooting in recorded American history
- List of school shootings in the United States by death toll
- List of school shootings in the United States (2000s)
- List of school shootings in the United States (2010s)
- List of school shootings in the United States (2020s)
- List of school shootings in Canada
- List of school shootings in Europe
- List of school-related attacks
- Mass shootings in the United States
- List of mass shootings in the United States
- List of unsuccessful attacks related to schools
