= White Rock Township, McDonald County, Missouri =

Township in McDonald County, Missouri, U.S.

Coordinates: 36.5489°N 94.2528°W

White Rock Township is an inactive township in McDonald County, in the U.S. state of Missouri.

White Rock Township was established in 1867, and named for deposits of white limestone within its borders.
