= Bursley Hall =

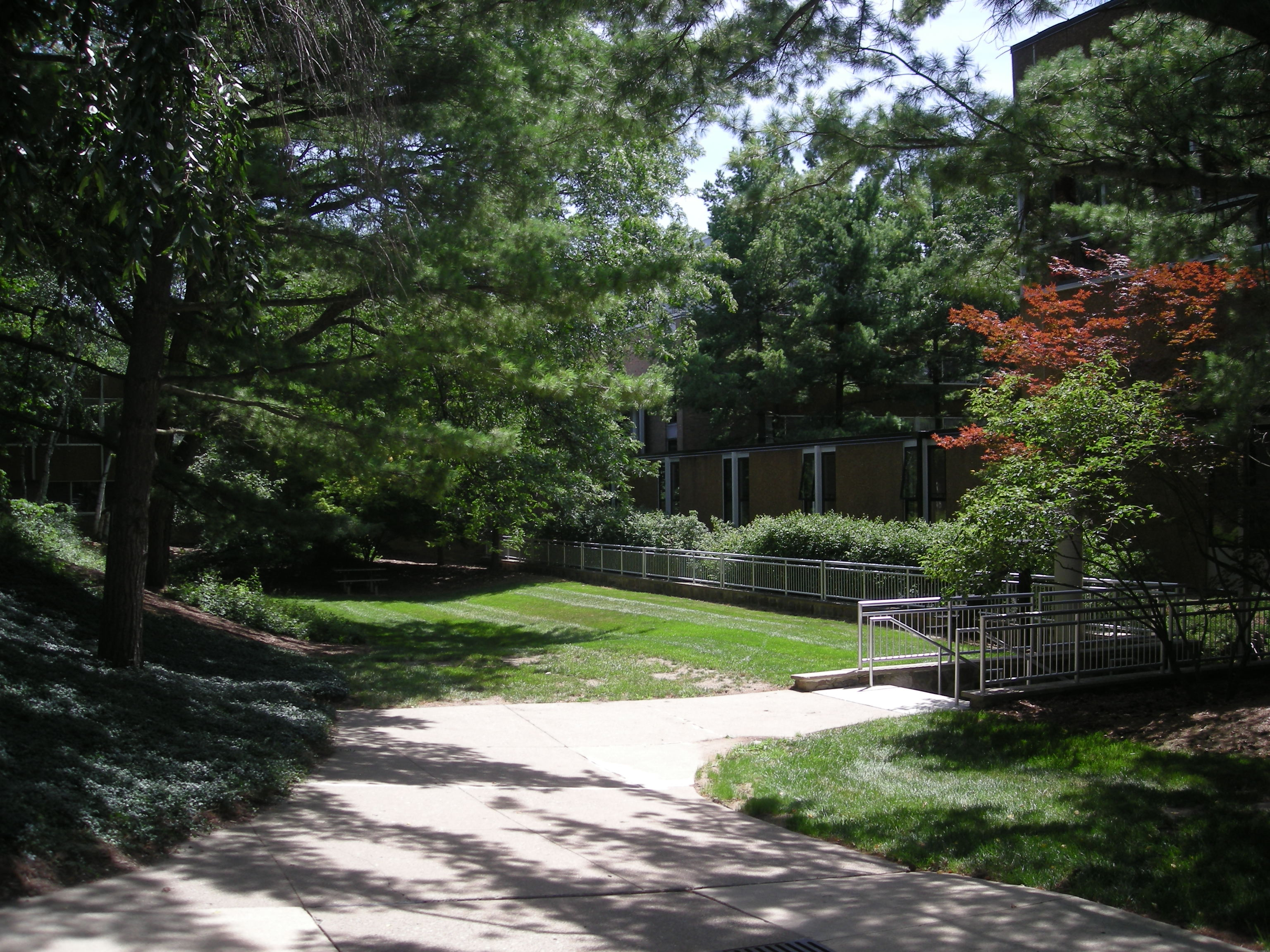
- Interactive map of the Bursley Hall area

General information
- Type: Residence Hall
- Location: Ann Arbor, Michigan, 1931 Duffield St.
- Coordinates: 42.2937°N 83.721°W
- Opened: October 5, 1967
- Owner: University of Michigan

Website
- www.housing.umich.edu/node/409

Bursley Hall is a University of Michigan residence hall located on the University of Michigan North Campus in Ann Arbor, Michigan. It is the largest dormitory at the University of Michigan, housing approximately 1,300 students.

Bursley Hall is named after Joseph Aldrich Bursley (1877-1950) and his wife, the former Marguerite Knowlton. Bursley was a U-M faculty member and administrator from 1904 to 1947. He served as professor of mechanical engineering, the first dean of men and dean of students. At the time of its opening on October 5, 1967, Bursley Hall was the newest residential complex at the University of Michigan and it remained so until 2010, when North Quad Residential and Academic Complex was opened on the University's Central Campus. Although the building has seen a number of upgrades, much of its original construction remains in place.

Bursley includes a convenience store, the Blue Market, and a dining hall that serves all University of Michigan students. Bursley's dining hall underwent extensive renovations to the seating areas in 2014, followed by a $4.5 million renovation to the 4,700 square foot food service area in the summer of 2016. This renovation reconfigured the service area to include five distinct food service stations, each dedicated to a particular type of cuisine.

In January 2015, the Sustainability Cultural Indicators Program (SCIP) began an experiment in Bursley Hall to increase composting opportunities beyond the dining hall and to educate students about composting and sustainability. Robert Marans, co-principal investigator of SCIP, says that composting opportunities will likely expand to other residence halls on the campus if the experiment in Bursley is successful.

== 1981 murders ==
The sixth floor of Bursley Hall was the site of a double-shooting that occurred on April 17, 1981. The morning of April 17, 22-year-old Leo Kelly Jr., a junior Psychology major at the University, threw several Molotov cocktail fire bombs down the sixth-floor hallway of Bursley's Douglas wing, igniting fires and triggering the building's fire alarms. Kelly had doused himself in flaming liquid but remained uninjured in the blasts. As students evacuated the building, Kelly retrieved a sawed-off shotgun from his room and then fired between two and five rounds at fleeing students. 19-year-old University freshman Edward Siwik, who was the fire marshal for his floor and was attempting to wake fellow students, and 21-year-old senior Douglas McGreaham, a fifth floor Resident Advisor attempting to assist with the evacuation, were shot in the chest and back, respectively, each dying from his wounds.

A veteran of the United States Air Force and an honor student from a Detroit high school, Kelly had no previous criminal record prior to the shootings. Kelly was a member of Omega Psi Phi fraternity, which had been implicated in a non-fatal shooting at Bursley the month prior. Kelly was arraigned on April 18, 1981 in Washtenaw County's 14th District Court where he entered a plea of not guilty by reason of insanity. Although Kelly's motive remained unclear throughout his trial, his lawyer indicated that he had been taking medication to treat an infection at the time of the shooting. On June 21, 1982, after a week-long trial, a jury sentenced Kelly to life in prison, and he is currently serving his term at Carson City Correctional Facility.
