= List of school shootings in the United States (2000s) =

This chronological list of school shootings in the United States in the 2000s includes school shootings in the United States that occurred at K–12 public and private schools, as well as at colleges and universities, and on school buses. Included in shootings are non-fatal accidental shootings. Excluded from this list are:

1. Incidents that occurred as a result of police actions
2. Murder–suicides by rejected suitors or estranged spouses
3. Suicides or suicide attempts involving only one person.
4. Shootings by school staff, where the only victims are other employees that are covered at workplace killings.

== Number of US school shootings by year with casualties ==
Year	Total number of shootings	Total number dead (including the shooters)	Total number wounded (including the shooters)	Total mass murders (4 or more deaths, not including the shooters)
2000	20	6	3	0
2001	6	5	17	0
2002	6	8	7	0
2003	5	6	7	0
2004	21	1	6	0
2005	11	13	16	1
2006	13	10	15	1
2007	10	41	35	1
2008	15	17	30	1
2009	10	4	20	0
Total	117	111	156	4

== 2000 ==
20 incidents.

Date	Location	Deaths	Injuries	Total	Description
January 10, 2000	Flint, Michigan	1	0	1	During a fight between students, the shooter fired two shots that missed his target.
January 13, 2000	Albuquerque, New Mexico	0	0	0	A fight in the Albuquerque High School parking lot resulted in shots being fired.
January 20, 2000	Asheville, North Carolina	0	0	0	During a basketball game at Erwin High School, a bullet from a high-powered rifle hit the wall. Four teenagers were arrested for the shooting, and the shooter was also charged with conspiracy and making bomb threats.
January 26, 2000	Merced, California	1	0	1	At Alicia Reyes Elementary School, an ongoing dispute escalated into gunfire.
January 26, 2000	Omaha, Nebraska	0	1	1	During a fight between two students, one student fired a gun at the other student, but missed and hit another uninvolved student.
February 10, 2000	Yeadon, Pennsylvania	0	0	0	A gun was fired during a fight, and missed; the shooter also pointed the gun at the principal, and it misfired.
February 14, 2000	Chicago, Illinois	0	1	1	At Duke Ellington Elementary School, a gun accidentally discharged in the bathroom, and the bullet went through the wall and hit a student in a classroom.
February 29, 2000	Flint, Michigan	1	0	1	Killing of Kayla Rolland: At Buell Elementary School, a 6-year-old boy fatally shot 6-year-old girl classmate Kayla Rolland. To date, the boy is the youngest documented fatal school shooter.
April 6, 2000	Hugo, Oklahoma	0	1	1	At Hugo High School, a fight between two mothers during a track meet resulted in a shooting that injured a third woman.
April 10, 2000	Tucson, Arizona	0	1	1	At La Cima Middle School, a teacher shot herself and blamed the shooting on a student who did not exist.
May 10, 2000	Sierra Vista, Arizona	2 (Note: Including the suspect or perpetrator)	0	2	A man killed his estranged wife in a preschool classroom at Carmichael Elementary School, then killed himself.
May 26, 2000	Lake Worth, Florida	1	0	1	13-year-old honor student Nathaniel Brazill was sent home for throwing water balloons, but returned to his Lake Worth Middle School with a family pistol. He fatally shot teacher Barry Grunow, who was popular at the school.
July 17, 2000	Renton, Washington	0	0	0	A student jumped on a cafeteria table, fired one shot into the ceiling, then ordered students to go to the stage, but they fled. Then the shooter fled.
August 28, 2000	Fayetteville, Arkansas	2	0	2	2000 University of Arkansas shooting: 36-year-old James Easton Kelly, a PhD candidate in Comparative Literature at University of Arkansas, killed 67-year-old John R. Locke, the English professor overseeing his coursework. Kelly had been dismissed from this PhD program for lack of progress toward his degree. Kelly shot Locke three times before committing suicide in the director's office, which campus police had isolated.
September 5, 2000	Bidwell, Ohio	2	0	2	At Bidwell Porter Elementary School, a cafeteria worker was murdered by her estranged husband, who then went home and killed himself.
September 18, 2000	Mount Healthy, Ohio	0	0	0	A 14-year-old student fired a gun into the ceiling inside a classroom at Mount Healthy North Junior High School. After a 25-minute standoff, the shooter surrendered to a police officer.
September 26, 2000	New Orleans, Louisiana	0	2	2	13 year-olds Darrel Johnson and Alfred Anderson were initially charged with attempted first-degree murder in the shooting of 15-year-old William Pennington. Pennington, after being shot, gained control of the gun and shot Johnson in the back. Charges were later reduced to aggravated battery. To prevent violence, Carter G. Woodson Middle School had students pass through metal detectors at the time. A 13-year-old student, who had recently been expelled for fighting, slipped the weapon, a .38-caliber revolver, through a chain link fence.
October 5, 2000	Minneapolis, Minnesota	0	2	2	At Minneapolis North High School, two people were shot after a homecoming dance.
December 1, 2000	San Diego, California	0	1	1	A 15-year-old Junipero Serra High School student who showed off a handgun on campus and threatened to shoot a classmate ended up accidentally shooting himself, causing minor injuries.
December 21, 2000	Miami, Florida	1	0	1	At Norland Elementary School, two teens shot and killed an armored car guard and stole money.

== 2001 ==
7 incidents.

Date	Location	Deaths	Injuries	Total	Description
January 3, 2001	San Francisco, California	0	1	1	At Balboa High School, one 15-year-old student was shot in the hip when a student showing it off had the gun discharge somehow, wounding the other person while inside a classroom. The victim was hospitalized in fair condition and then subsequently in good condition.
February 2, 2001	Detroit, Michigan	0	3	3	At Osborn High School, two students and a teacher were grazed by gunfire after a student fired a gun in their classroom.
March 5, 2001	Santee, California	2	13	15	Santana High School shooting: 15-year-old student Charles Andrew Williams killed two students, 14-year-old Bryan Zuckor and 17-year-old Randy Gordon, at Santana High School. In total, he wounded thirteen others. Williams was arrested and convicted of murder and attempted murder. He was sentenced to life with the chance of parole after serving 50 years.
March 7, 2001	Williamsport, Pennsylvania	0	1	1	14-year-old student Elizabeth Catherine Bush wounded fellow student Kimberly Marchese in the cafeteria of Bishop Neumann High School. Bush was released in 2004.
March 22, 2001	El Cajon, California	0	6	6	18-year-old former student Jason Hoffman opened fire at Granite Hills High School, injuring five people before being shot and wounded by a police officer. He was convicted of assault and sentenced to prison, where he committed suicide in October 2001.
March 30, 2001	Gary, Indiana	1	0	1	17-year-old Donald Ray Burt Jr. fatally shot Neal Boyd IV with one bullet to the head in a parking lot outside Lew Wallace High School. Burt was sentenced to 57 years in prison.
May 16, 2001	Parkland, Washington	2	0	2	40-year-old music instructor and organist James D. Holloway was shot multiple times with a .22-caliber handgun at Pacific Lutheran University by a 55-year-old man from Tacoma. The shooter was not a student or employee of the university, and he also killed himself. The victim was apparently chosen at random, as the shooter had a personal dispute with a different staff member who was not on campus that day.

== 2002 ==
7 incidents.

Date	Location	Deaths	Injuries	Total	Description
January 15, 2002	New York City, New York	0	2	2	17-year-old Vincent Rodriguez wounded two students at Martin Luther King, Jr. High School in Manhattan with a semi-automatic pistol. He retaliated against the people who had harassed his girlfriend. In February 2003, Rodriguez was sentenced to ten years in prison on charges of assault and attempted assault.
January 16, 2002	Grundy, Virginia	3	3	6	Appalachian School of Law shooting: Recently dismissed graduate student 42-year-old Peter Odighizuwa killed three people at the Appalachian School of Law: 42-year-old dean Anthony Sutin, 41-year-old professor Thomas Blackwell, and 33-year-old student Angela Dales. Three other students were also wounded. In 2005 Odighizuwa received three life sentences and an additional 28 years without the possibility of parole.
February 20, 2002	Milwaukee, Wisconsin	1	0	1	16-year-old Washington High School student, Joseph Johnson Jr., was killed by then 22 years old Phillip D. Jackson Jr., when violence erupted between rival supporters in the parking lot, after a basketball game against Vincent High School.
October 7, 2002	Bowie, Maryland	0	1	1	In the Beltway sniper attacks, one victim of several was 13-year-old Iran Brown, who was wounded as he arrived at Benjamin Tasker Middle School in Bowie, Maryland. His aunt, a nurse who had just dropped him off, rushed him to a hospital emergency room. Despite serious injuries, Brown survived the attack. The shooters, Lee Boyd Malvo and John Allen Muhammad, were later convicted of numerous unrelated murders committed during their killing spree. Muhammad was executed in 2009, while Malvo was sentenced to life in prison.
October 28, 2002	Tucson, Arizona	4	0	4	2002 University of Arizona shooting: Failing nursing college student and Gulf War veteran, 40-year-old Robert Stewart Flores Jr., killed three assistant professors of nursing at the University of Arizona; this included 50-year-old Robin Rogers, 44-year-old Cheryl McGaffic, and 45-year-old Barbara Monroe. Flores finished by turning the gun on himself.
October 29, 2002	Jersey City, New Jersey	0	1	1	A 15-year-old student was shot in the abdomen and wounded inside the basement of Lincoln High School during an argument with another student. Another 15-year-old student was arrested and charged with attempted murder.
December 13, 2002	Carson, Washington	1	2	3	13-year-old Wind River Middle School student Tony Fiske fired a rifle round into a classroom, wounding two students with broken glass. Fiske was found dead of a self-inflicted gunshot wound in a forest across from the school the following day.

== 2003 ==
5 incidents.

Date	Location	Deaths	Injuries	Total	Description
April 2, 2003	Washington, D.C.	0	1	1	A 10th-grader was shot in the leg near Cardozo High School in Columbia Heights, resulting in a three-hour lockdown at six D.C. public schools to allow for police to search for possible gunmen.
April 14, 2003	New Orleans, Louisiana	1	3	4	John McDonogh High School shooting. 18-year-old Steven Williams, and 17-year-old James Tate, opened fire with an AK-47 and a handgun in the gymnasium of John McDonogh High School, killing a 15-year-old student and wounding three female students. Williams was sentenced to life imprisonment, and Tate to 15 years.
April 24, 2003	Red Lion, Pennsylvania	2	0	2	14-year-old student James Sheets entered Red Lion Area Junior High School armed with his stepfather's pistols. He killed the school's principal, Eugene Segro, before killing himself.
May 9, 2003	Cleveland, Ohio	1	3	4	2003 Case Western Reserve University shooting: On May 9, 2003, Biswanath Halder, a 62-year-old business school alumnus of Case Western Reserve University, killed a graduate student, wounded a professor, and wounded another student using a semi-automatic rifle. He held the building and its nearly 100 occupants hostage for seven hours. He exchanged fire with police and SWAT officers several times during the incident before being wounded and apprehended by a SWAT team. He was sentenced to life in prison.
September 24, 2003	Cold Spring, Minnesota	2	0	2	2003 Rocori High School shooting: 15-year-old John Jason McLaughlin shot 15-year-old freshman Seth Bartell and 17-year-old senior Aaron Rollins at Rocori High School. Rollins was killed immediately, and Bartell died from his wounds 16 days later. McLaughlin was sentenced to life in prison with the chance of parole in 2038.

== 2004 ==
22 incidents.

Date	Location	Deaths	Injuries	Total	Description
January 15, 2004	Pomona, California	1	1	2	At Pomona High School, a female student was accidentally shot with a .22-cal pistol.
February 2, 2004	Washington, D.C.	1	1	2	Thomas J. Boykin was acquitted of the murder of 17-year-old James Richardson, a football player at Ballou High School in Southeast Washington, though the jury hung on lesser charges. An 18-year-old student was also grazed in the leg by a bullet. Boykin later pled guilty to manslaughter.
February 3, 2004	Houston, Texas	0	1	1	At Youens Elementary School, a student accidentally shot himself after showing off a gun to classmates.
February 9, 2004	East Greenbush, New York	0	1	1	16-year-old Jon W. Romano, in East Greenbush, New York, fired two rounds from a shotgun before wounding a teacher with a third at Columbia High School. He was tackled by the assistant principal and charged with one count of attempted murder. Since the shooting, Romano was released in 2020, was severely injured in a sword attack in 2022, and has gained a following on TikTok.
February 11, 2004	Philadelphia, Pennsylvania	1	1	2	A 10-year-old boy was killed, and a security guard was injured at T M Peirce Elementary School during a shootout between drug deals.
February 13, 2004	Dayton, Ohio	0	2	2	Two people were injured in a gang-related drive-by shooting at Saledad Enrichment Action Charter High School.
March 5, 2004	Los Angeles, California	0	1	1	At Colonel White High School, a student was shot during a carjacking.
May 4, 2004	Houston, Texas	0	0	0	At Kashmere High School, multiple shots were fired.
May 7, 2004	Randallstown, Maryland	0	4	4	Two students were charged with a school shooting that arose from a dispute after a basketball game at Randallstown High School. Four people were injured, two seriously. One student was paralyzed from the waist down.
May 12, 2004	Merced, California	0	2	2	At the East Campus Educational Center, a 19-year-old man and a 17-year-old girl were injured in a gang related shooting
May 24, 2004	Salt Lake City, Utah	2	0	2	At West High School, a man shot and killed his estranged wife, who was a cafeteria worker.
May 24, 2004	Biggs, California	0	1	1	At Biggs High School, a teen was shot near the halftime show of a homecoming football game.
June 9, 2004	Oakland, California	0	2	2	At Castlemont High School, two students were shot in a gang-related drive-by shooting.
September 24, 2004	Indianapolis, Indiana	2	0	2	A Butler University Police officer was shot and killed by a man near Hinkle Fieldhouse after a report of a suspicious individual. Police later located the gunman and fatally shot him.
October 2, 2004	Grand Island, Nebraska	0	1	1	A man shot another man at Jefferson Elementary School.
October 12, 2004	Sunnyvale, California	2 (Note: Including both of the perpetrators or suspects)	0	2	At Lakewood Elementary School, two men fatally shot each other in a dispute over a woman.
October 21, 2004	Baltimore, Maryland	0	2	2	Two brothers were shot at Thurgood Marshall High School when other students were fighting over a girl.
October 22, 2004	Hayward, California	1	0	1	A man was killed in the parking lot of Tyrrell Elementary School.
November 15, 2004	Gary, Indiana	0	1	1	At Brunswisk Elementary School, two men got into an argument, which escalated into gunfire, which injured a mother caught in the crossfire.
November 16, 2004	Beaufort, South Carolina	0	1	1	At Battery Creek High School, a student was shot during a basketball game.
November 17, 2004	Apopka, Florida	0	1	1	A 14-year-old student fired a shot in the bathroom of Apopka Memorial Middle School.
December 31, 2004	Richmond, Texas	1	1	2	At Richmond State School, a food service employee was paralyzed after being shot by a co-worker who later committed suicide.

== 2005 ==
19 incidents.

Date	Location	Deaths	Injuries	Total	Description
February 8, 2005	Chicago, Illinois	0	1	1	An 18-year-old student at Bowen High School was shot in the leg as she left the school around 2:30 p.m.
March 2, 2005	Dover, Tennessee	1	0	1	14-year-old Jason Clinard killed his bus driver, 47-year-old Joyce Gregory, as she stopped to pick him up. Gregory had earlier reported Clinard for using snuff on the school bus. Clinard was given a life sentence. but he appealed his conviction; in October 2023, the court ruled he had poor legal representation at trial and likely never should have been tried as an adult and was immediately released.
March 17, 2005	Los Angeles, California	1	0	1	A girl was fatally shot outside Locke High School.
March 21, 2005	Red Lake, Minnesota	8	9	17	Red Lake shootings: 16-year-old student Jeff Weise drove to Red Lake Senior High School armed with his grandfather's police weapons. Weise killed five students, one teacher, and one security guard, and wounding seven others, before entering a gunfight with police officers, which resulted in his suicide. Minutes earlier, he killed his grandfather and his grandfather's girlfriend at their home, where he had been living, at the Red Lake Indian Reservation.
April 7, 2005	Canton, Texas	1	7	1	A father of a student at Canton High School went to the school and shot the coach for cutting his son from all sports. He was sentenced to 20 years in prison for his crimes.
April 27, 2005	Reserve, Louisiana	0	0	0	A student at Leon Godchaux Junior High School accidentally fired a gun in his pocket.
May 4, 2005	Shreveport, Louisiana	1 (Note: Including one of the perpetrators)	0	1	At Booker T Washington High School a student accidentally shot himself in the leg with a gun in his pocket.
July 18, 2005	Newark, New Jersey	1	2	3	After breaking up a fight between a group of youths at Weequahic High School, Special Officer Dwayne Reeves was shot and killed, and his partner was wounded in the hand by two men who pulled up alongside him in a car. Despite being wounded, Reeves' partner was able to return fire and hit one of the suspects in the stomach. The gunman was convicted of manslaughter and, in 2007, was sentenced to 30 years in prison and was paroled in 2019.
August 2005	Saginaw, Michigan	0	0	0	At Arthur Hill High School, a drive-by shooter fired three shots from a shotgun and blew out the back window of a car in the school parking lot after school let out.
September 1, 2005	Anchorage, Alaska	0	0	0	At Dimond High School, a shots were fired during a fight in the parking lot.
September 8, 2005	Richmond, California	1	0	1	A 28-year-old new parolee was found shot to death on the grounds of John F. Kennedy High School.
September 13, 2005	Chicago, Illinois	0	1	1	At Harlan Community Academy High School, a fight broke out between two 15-year-old boys in the gymnasium. Christopher Huff took out a pistol, shooting the other youth in the leg. A police officer on duty at the school arrested the gunman. The shooter was charged as an adult with aggravated battery with a firearm.
September 24, 2005	Saginaw, Michigan	0	1	1	At Saginaw High School, two students, a 15-year-old and a 14-year-old, were shot at during a drive-by shooting. They were leaving a homecoming dance.
October 11, 2005	Farmington, Michigan	0	0	0	At Farmington High School, a 17-year-old male brought a disassembled shotgun to the school. The shooter brought the shotgun to the school in three pieces, assembled it in the bathroom, and then shot it at the ceiling. No one was injured. At Plantation Elementary School inside Saginaw High School, a 15-year-old male was shot in the chest by another 15-year-old male.
October 19, 2005	San Bernardino, California	0	1	1	A student at San Gorgonio High School was shot after being dropped off at the school.
October 27, 2005	Fresno, California	1	0	1	A man was fatally shot at in a staff parking lot of Birney Elementary School.
November 8, 2005	Jacksboro, Tennessee	1	2	3	2005 Campbell County High School shooting: Inside the Campbell County High School office, 15-year-old Kenneth Bartley shot the school's then principal, Gary Seale. He shot assistant principals Ken Bruce and Jim Pierce. Bruce later died from his wound. Bartley was sentenced to 45 years in prison, with a chance of parole after 29 years.
November 16, 2005	San Antonio, Texas	1	0	1	A school police officer shot and killed an 18-year-old male who allegedly attempted to run down the officer as he attempted to stop the suspect and another male from stealing a car in a middle school parking lot.
December 6, 2005	Detroit, Michigan	0	1	1	At Central High School, an 18-year-old former student was shot and injured in a vestibule.

== 2006 ==
20 incidents.

Date	Location	Deaths	Injuries	Total	Description
January 13, 2006	Longwood, Florida	1	0	1	A 15-year-old male middle school student named Christopher Penley was shot by the SWAT team after pulling out a gun out in class at Milwee Middle School, briefly taking another student hostage, and running through the school. The student, who police said was suicidal and threatening to kill himself, was isolated in a restroom where he was shot by the SWAT team after he reportedly raised the gun at a deputy. The gun was later found to be a pellet gun fashioned after a 9mm handgun, which is what the police later reported as believing what he actually had in his possession. The 15-year-old died from his injuries the next day, according to reports.
January 13, 2006	Pinson, Alabama	1	0	1	Marcus Alexander, 17-year-old male high school junior was shot in the neck and groin during a fight with Brandon Ray Daniels, a 20-year-old male high school senior in the parking lot of Pinson Valley High after a basketball game between Pinson Valley High and Erwin High School. Deputies arrested Daniels in the parking lot after the incident.
February 9, 2006	Tampa, Florida	1	0	1	Three teenagers shot and killed a former University of South Florida employee as he left a residence hall where he had been visiting his fiancée.
February 23, 2006	Roseburg, Oregon	0	1	1	14-year-old freshman Vincent Wayne Leodoro shot 16-year-old student Joseph Monti four times in the back with a handgun at Roseburg High School. Leodoro left the school campus and was confronted by six police officers near a restaurant. He threatened suicide but was persuaded to surrender. He was found guilty of attempted murder and assault in July 2006, and was sentenced to be held in prison until he turns twenty five years old.
March 14, 2006	Reno, Nevada	0	2	2	2006 Pine Middle School shooting: In the hallway of Pine Middle School, 14-year-old James Scott Newman injured two 14-year-old classmates, Alexander Rueda and Kenzie McKeon, with a revolver belonging to his parents. Two students received minor wounds. A physical education teacher subdued Newman. The youth was arrested and charged as an adult for attempted murder, use of a deadly weapon, and use of a firearm by a minor. He later pleaded guilty to charges of two counts of battery with a deadly weapon, and was sentenced as a juvenile. Newman was sentenced to house arrest until he completed two hundred hours of community service.
May 5, 2006	Miramar, Florida	1	0	1	A 19-year-old male was shot in the head with a single gunshot and died following a fight in the parking lot of Parkway Academy during a school dance.
June 5, 2006	Los Angeles, California	0	1	1	17-year-old Augustine Contreras was shot and killed in the Venice High School parking lot during a fight as school was dismissing. The incident occurred following a dispute involving gang ties and a robbery attempt involving students.
June 8, 2006	Gary, Indiana	0	1	1	A 21-year-old male was shot and killed in the parking lot of Wirt high school during a graduation ceremony. Two brothers, ages 28 and 18, were arrested. Police indicate that incident stemmed from an ongoing feud between the suspects and victim.
June 15, 2006	Detroit, Michigan	0	1	1	At Pershing High School, a 16-year-old boy was shot in the back by four men after the men drove up to him and shot him outside the school.
July 31, 2006	Tampa, Florida	2	0	2	A married couple were found shot to death in the parking lot of a middle school.
August 24, 2006	Essex Junction, Vermont	2	3	5	Christopher Williams, 26, shot his girlfriend's mother, Linda Lambesis, 57, at her home, and from there he went to Essex Elementary School, where Andrea, his girlfriend, worked. After he arrived at the elementary school, which was not in session at the time, he shot and killed Mary Alicia Shanks, 56, and shot Mary Snedeker, 52, nonfatally. He left the school and allegedly shot Chad Johansen, 26, non-fatally. He then turned the gun on himself, but did not die as a result. Williams was sentenced to life in prison without parole in 2008.
August 30, 2006	Hillsborough, North Carolina	1	2	3	After fatally shooting his father, Rafael Castillo, 18-year-old Alvaro Castillo drove the family minivan to his former high school. He opened fire, wounding two students. He was reportedly obsessed with the Columbine High School massacre and had written an email to the current Columbine High School principal before committing his own crime. he was sentenced to life without parole.
September 2, 2006	Shepherdstown, West Virginia	3	0	3	49-year-old Douglas W. Pennington, killed himself and his two sons, 26-year-old Logan P. Pennington, 24-year-old Benjamin M. Pennington, during a visit to the campus of Shepherd University.
September 17, 2006	Pittsburgh, Pennsylvania	0	5	5	Five Duquesne University basketball players were shot early Sunday morning during an apparent act of random violence on campus, leaving three hospitalized — two of them in critical condition.
September 22, 2006	Washington, D.C.	0	1	1	Eugene Huff, 17, and an unnamed 16-year-old male sophomore were arguing at one of Cardozo High School's entrances. The fight climaxed when Eugene pulled out a handgun and shot his classmate in the leg. The shooting was captured on the school's surveillance system, and witnesses said they heard as many as seven shots.
September 27, 2006	Bailey, Colorado	2	0	2	Platte Canyon High School hostage crisis: 53-year-old drifter, Duane Roger Morrison, walked into Platte Canyon High School and took six girls hostage. During the ensuing siege, Morrison sexually assaulted all of the girls. When a SWAT team stormed the classroom, Morrison killed 16-year-old Emily Keyes, then took his own life after being shot and wounded by police.
September 29, 2006	Cazenovia, Wisconsin	1	0	1	2006 Weston High School shooting: Eric Hainstock, a 15-year-old freshman, entered Weston High School and aimed a shotgun at a social studies teacher before it was wrestled from him by a school custodian. Hainstock then shot the high school principal, who died later that afternoon. Hainstock was convicted of murder and is serving a life sentence.
October 2, 2006	Nickel Mines, Pennsylvania	7	4	11	West Nickel Mines School shooting: 32-year-old milk truck driver, Charles Carl Roberts IV, killed five Amish girls and wounded five others before killing himself in an Amish school in the hamlet of Nickel Mines, in Bart Township, Lancaster County.
October 9, 2006	Joplin, Missouri	0	0	0	13-year-old student Thomas White fired one shot from a MAK-90 rifle at a hallway ceiling at Memorial Middle School. The gunshot struck a water pipe, and nobody was injured. He also tried repeatedly to shoot principal Stephen Gilbreth at near-point-blank range as Gilbreth ushered him out of the school. Joplin police say the attempt was foiled by an improperly seated ammunition magazine in the rifle. The principal was not injured. White was tried as an adult on charges of assault and firearms possession, and in 2009, he was sentenced to ten years in prison.
December 12, 2006	Erdenheim, Pennsylvania	1	0	1	16-year-old Shane Halligan fired several shots into the ceiling of a hallway at Springfield Township High School before shooting himself to death.

== 2007 ==
11 incidents.

Date	Location	Deaths	Injuries	Total	Description
January 3, 2007	Tacoma, Washington	1	0	1	18-year-old student Douglas S. Chanthabouly, killed 17-year-old Samnang Kok, in the hallways of Henry Foss High School following a personal disagreement. In 2009, Chanthabouly was sentenced to 23 years in prison on a charge of second-degree murder.
January 4, 2007	Detroit, Michigan	1	0	1	At Northwestern High School, a 14-year-old girl was shot in her left leg when two men in a car shot at her as she was standing with a group of students.
March 6, 2007	Midland, Michigan	1	1	2	At H.H. Dow High School, 17-year-old David Benjamin Turner shot his 17-year-old ex-girlfriend Jessica Forsyth as they were in the school parking lot after Turner had called Forsyth and asked her to meet him at the school so he could return some of her stuff. Forsyth and her mother drove to the school. When she got out of the car, Turner pulled out a gun, shot her, and then committed suicide by shooting himself in the head.
March 7, 2007	Compton, California	0	1	1	During an argument with several non-students and students, a student was shot in the elbow and wounded in the eating area at Centennial High School. The shooting occurred an hour after classes were dismissed, and students in after-school activities were sent home.
April 16, 2007	Blacksburg, Virginia	33	23 (Note: 17 by gunfire)	56	Virginia Tech shooting: A 23-year-old student, Seung-Hui Cho, armed with two pistols, a Glock 19 and a Walther P22, killed thirty-two students and faculty members at Virginia Tech and wounded another seventeen students and faculty members in two separate attacks before committing suicide. The first attack was on the second floor of West Ambler Johnston Hall, where he shot a young girl and another student who came to help. He then changed his clothes, recorded multiple videos stating that he "had to do it for his brothers and sisters", and made several pictures of himself with hammers, large knives, and guns. He then chained the doors of Norris Hall shut and shot and killed thirty more students and staff. He also shot seventeen more students and staff, wounding them. Six more students were also wounded from non-gunshot injuries as they jumped out of the windows to flee the shooter. He was described as extremely quiet and lonely. During the rampage, he wore a black T-shirt, a russet vest, a backward baseball cap, black military cargo pants, black boots, and grip gloves. The incident is the third-deadliest mass shooting by a lone gunman after the Orlando nightclub shooting and the 2017 Las Vegas shooting, and the deadliest school shooting, in modern U.S. history.
May 10, 2007	Detroit, Michigan	0	2	2	Two 17-year-olds were outside Henry Ford High School when four people in a car opened fire at them. Police believe the shooting was gang-related.
August 4, 2007	Newark, New Jersey	3	1	4	
September 21, 2007	Dover, Delaware	1	1	2	Two 17-year-old Delaware State University freshmen were shot on campus. One died 32 days later on October 23, from critical injuries sustained in the attack. A suspected perpetrator, Loyer D. Braden, a freshman from East Orange, New Jersey, was arrested and charged with attempted murder; the charges were dismissed in May 2009.
September 28, 2007	Oroville, California	0	3	4	Greg Wright, a 17-year-old Las Plumas High School student, opened fire twice with a handgun inside a classroom, and took 30 students and a teacher hostage. Ten to fifteen minutes later, Wright let go all but three female students, who were held captive for another 70-80 minutes before police arrested Wright without any violent intervention. The three suffered scrapes and bruises, but were not hit by any gunfire. Wright was sentenced to nearly two decades in prison.
October 10, 2007	Cleveland, Ohio	1	5	6	2007 SuccessTech Academy shooting: in downtown Cleveland, 14-year-old student Asa H. Coon shot two students and two teachers in the halls and classrooms on the fourth floor of the building. Coon then moved to another room on the same floor, where he fatally shot himself.
November 7, 2007	Miami Gardens, Florida	0	1	1	At Miami Carol City Senior High School, a robber shot a teacher, who had been smoking a cigarette outside the campus building. The 18-year-old robber stole the teacher's wallet and was later arrested. The teacher survived the shooting.

== 2008 ==
16 incidents.

Date	Location	Deaths	Injuries	Total	Description
January 23, 2008	Jonesboro, Arkansas	0	1	1	Arkansas State University offensive line-man 20-year Alfred Louis was grazed in the lower left leg when someone fired several rounds from a 9mm handgun at a residence hall. He was treated at a local hospital. Charges were later dismissed against the person accused of firing the shots.
February 4, 2008	Memphis, Tennessee	0	1	1	At Hamilton High School, a student shot a 16-year-old student in the leg during a classroom argument over rap music. The victim's injury was not life-threatening.
February 8, 2008	Baton Rouge, Louisiana	3	0	3	Latina Williams, a 23-year-old nursing student at Louisiana Technical College, killed two classmates and herself in a second-floor classroom.
February 11, 2008	Miami Gardens, Florida	0	1	1	43-year-old 11th grade algebra teacher, Sergio Miranda, was shot by 19-year-old Patrick Lively, outside Miami Carol City Senior High School during a robbery but was expected to survive. In 2011, Lively received a life sentence.
February 11, 2008	Memphis, Tennessee	0	1	1	Following a feud that started off campus earlier in the week, a 19-year-old senior was shot by a 17-year-old sophomore during a gym class held in the cafeteria with about 75 other students at Mitchell High School, before handing the gun to a coach, making no attempt to flee. The victim suffered at least two gunshot wounds and was in critical condition; the suspected shooter was in custody. "He walked up to him, shot him, and made a statement to the coach that 'It's over now,' ", said principal, Daniel Ware.
February 12, 2008	Oxnard, California	1	0	1	Murder of Larry King: 14-year-old Brandon McInerney shot 15-year-old Lawrence "Larry" King twice in the head in the computer laboratory of E.O. Green Junior High School. McInerney was apprehended in a nearby neighborhood. King, who was openly homosexual, died two days later. McInerney was initially charged with a hate crime, but that charge was dropped. McInerney pleaded guilty to second-degree murder and was sentenced to 21 years in prison.
February 14, 2008	DeKalb, Illinois	6	21	27	Northern Illinois University shooting: 27-year-old Steven Kazmierczak, shot multiple people with a shotgun in a classroom of Northern Illinois University, killing five and injuring 21, seventeen of them by gunfire, before taking his own life. Kazmierczak was not enrolled at the university, but had attended in the years before the attack.
February 27, 2008	Little Rock, Arkansas	0	1	1	33-year-old James Earl Matthews was shot in the stomach and buttocks at close range with a handgun on the University of Arkansas at Little Rock campus. He survived. Gerald Pride Jr. was sentenced to 20 years on multiple charges.
March 6, 2008	Mobile, Alabama	1	0	1	18-year-old Jajuan Holmes, a recently suspended Davidson High School student, fired a shot into the ceiling of the school's gym during a school assembly before killing himself.
August 14, 2008	Federal Way, Washington	1	0	1	26-year-old Omero Mendez was waiting at the Lakota Middle School campus to pick up his girlfriend's son. He was confronted by 16-year-old Luis F. Cosgaya-Alvarez and two of his friends, driving in an SUV. Cosgaya-Alvarez flashed gang signs at Mendez and shot him once in the head. Mendez later died of his injuries. Cosgaya-Alvarez was arrested a few days later in Seattle and was charged with murder. Cosgaya-Alvarez pleaded guilty to murder and weapon enhancements and was sentenced to eighteen years in prison.
August 21, 2008	Knoxville, Tennessee	1	0	1	At Central High School, 15-year-old Jamar Siler killed 15-year-old Ryan McDonald. In 2011, Siler was sentenced to thirty years in prison after pleading guilty to murder in a plea agreement.
September 2, 2008	Willoughby, Ohio	0	0	0	A 15-year-old student brought a handgun into South High School, and shot two rounds, one into the ceiling and one shattering a trophy case. The student then put the gun to his head. Then Assistant Principal Jeff Lyons talked the student out of doing any harm.
October 13, 2008	Universal City, Texas	1	0	1	A librarian shot and killed a co-worker in the Northeast Lakeview College library.
October 16, 2008	Detroit, Michigan	1	3	4	16-year-old Christopher Walker was killed, and three other teenagers were seriously wounded during a drive-by shooting near Henry Ford High School, soon after classes let out. Three teenagers were arrested and charged in connection with the shooting. The shooter, 15-year-old William Morton, was sentenced to life without parole, and Devon Bell was sentenced to forty-two years of prison.
October 26, 2008	Conway, Arkansas	2	1	3	2008 University of Central Arkansas shooting: Four young men fatally shot two students, 18-year-old Ryan Henderson, and 19-year-old Chavares Block, and wounded a 19-year-old campus visitor in the leg, outside the Arkansas Hall dormitory of University of Central Arkansas.
November 12, 2008	Fort Lauderdale, Florida	1	0	1	15-year-old Amanda Collette, was killed in the hallway at Dillard High School. The shooter, 15-year-old Teah Wimberly, was sentenced to twenty-five years in prison on a first-degree murder charge.

== 2009 ==
12 incidents.

Date	Location	Deaths	Injuries	Total	Description
January 9, 2009	Chicago, Illinois	0	5	5	After attendees were leaving a basketball game at Dunbar High School, a truck pulled over, and someone inside fired shots at the crowd, wounding five people, three critically. 18-year-old Georgio Dukes was arrested and charged a week later with five counts of felony aggravated battery with a firearm. Police believe that the attack was gang-related.
January 20, 2009	Mount Morris Township, Michigan	0	4	4	Four people, ranging in age from 16 to 20-years-old, were shot and injured in the parking lot of Beecher High School after a basketball game.
February 17, 2009	Detroit, Michigan	0	3	3	At Central High School, a 17-year-old male shot a 19-year-old male, who shot a nearby 18-year-old after the teenagers had been involved in a fight.
April 10, 2009	Dearborn, Michigan	2	0	2	28-year-old Henry Ford Community College student Anthony Powell shot and killed 20-year-old Asia McGowan in a classroom before killing himself.
April 26, 2009	Hampton, Virginia	0	3	3	18-year-old Odane Greg Maye, a former student of Hampton University, followed a 43-year-old pizza delivery man into his former dormitory. Armed with three guns, Maye wounded the deliveryman, then the dorm monitor. Lastly, Maye shot himself in a suicide attempt. He survived and was convicted of two charges of malicious wounding, two counts of using a gun in a felony, burglary, and shooting in an occupied building. He was sentenced to 14 years in prison in November 2009 and ordered by a judge to pay more than $62,000 in restitution to his victims for lost wages.
May 18, 2009	Cambridge, Massachusetts	1	0	1	20-year-old Jabrai Copney, 23-year-old Jason Aquino, and 19-year-old Blayn Jiggetts, of New York City, invited 21-year-old Justin Cosby, of Cambridge, into a Harvard College dormitory. After trying to rob him of one pound (450 g) of marijuana, they shot him. The victim, Cosby, was pronounced dead early the next day. Copney turned himself in three days later and was convicted of murder and sentenced to life without parole. His partners pleaded guilty to armed robbery and manslaughter, with Jiggetts being sentenced to 9 to 12 years in prison and Aquino being sentenced to 18 to 20 years in prison. His girlfriend, 21-year-old Brittany Smith, pleaded guilty to accessory after the fact, firearm possession, and misleading a grand jury and was sentenced to 3 years in prison.
May 18, 2009	Larose, Louisiana	1	0	1	15-year-old Larose-Cut Off Middle School student, Justin Doucet, carried his backpack to a restroom, where he put on camouflage clothes and took out a semi-automatic handgun before storming into a nearby classroom. He attempted to shoot a teacher, Jessica Plaisance, but the gun did not fire. He returned to the restroom and shot himself in the head, dying a week later of his wounds.
June 16, 2009	San Francisco, California	0	3	3	After students were let out of International Studies Academy on the first day of summer school classes, a man left a car. He opened fire, wounding three people, including a 17-year-old female student. An 18-year-old man was arrested for being an accessory to the crime.
June 24, 2009	Parkersburg, Iowa	1	0	1	Coach Edward Arthur Thomas, the football coach at Aplington–Parkersburg High School, was shot and killed in the school's weight room by a former player.
September 3, 2009	San Bruno, California	0	1	1	A 20-year-old student was wounded in the parking lot of Skyline College after an argument between him and other men. The college campus was placed on lockdown. Three San Francisco residents, 18-year-old Germaine B. Benjamin, 20-year-old Dimaryea J. McGhee, and 18-year-old Jacori W. Bender, were each arrested and charged with felony firearm offenses.
October 14, 2009	Hollywood, California	0	1	1	A 16-year-old girl was shot in the hip within two blocks of Helen Bernstein High School, where classes had just ended for the day. It was believed by authorities to have stemmed from gang violence, and that the girl shot was not an intended target.
October 16, 2009	Myrtle Beach, South Carolina	1	1	2	At Carolina Forest High School, a 16-year-old male student lunged at a school resource officer with a knife. After a struggle, the officer fatally shot the student.

== See also ==
- List of school shootings in the United States by death toll
- List of school shootings in the United States (before 2000)
- List of school shootings in the United States (2010s)
- List of school shootings in the United States (2020s)
- List of school shootings in Europe
- Lists of school-related attacks
- List of mass shootings in the United States
- List of unsuccessful attacks related to schools
