= List of school shootings in the United States by death toll =

Notable school shootings in the U.S.

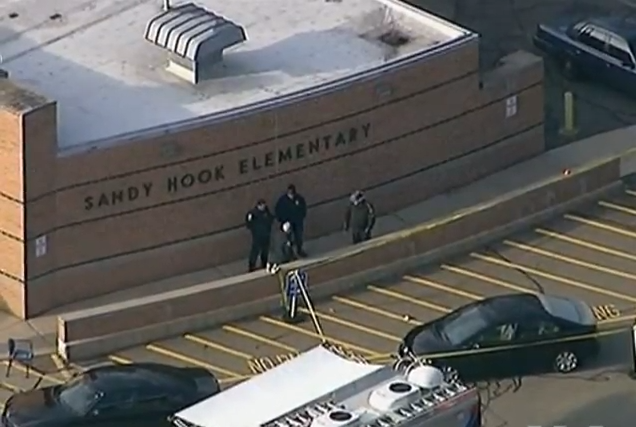
Sandy Hook Elementary School shooting

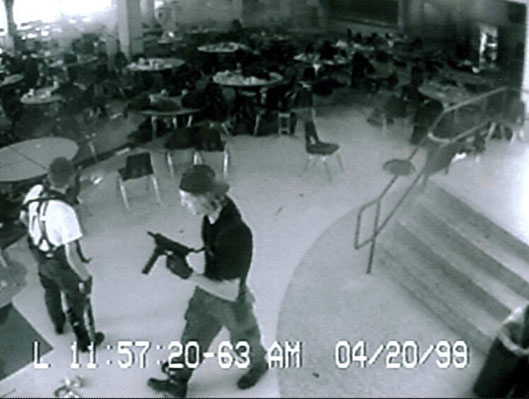
Columbine High School massacre

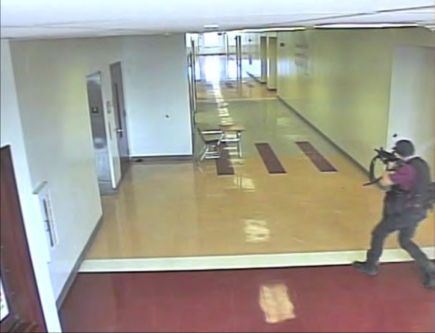
Parkland high school shooting

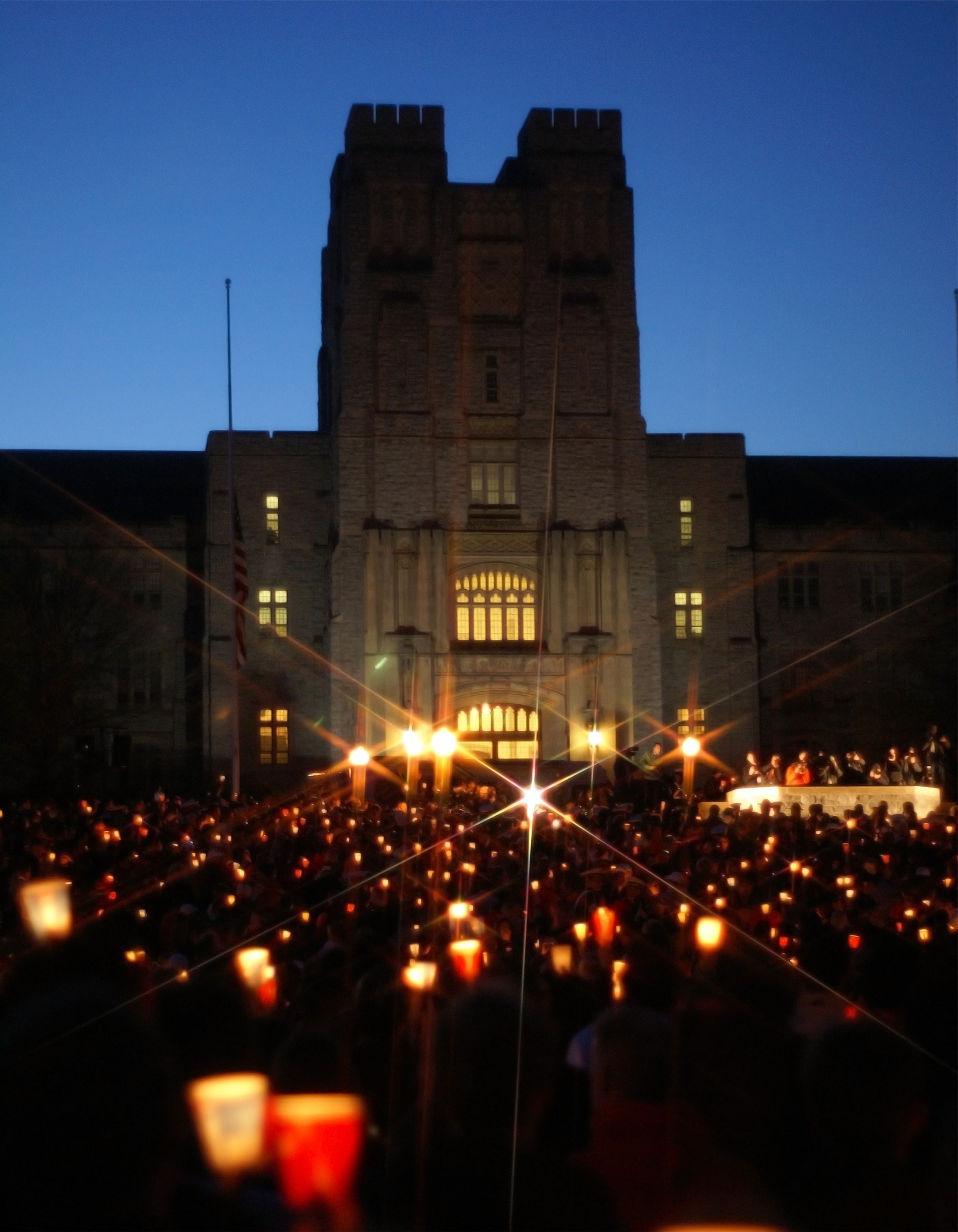
Virginia Tech shooting

This article lists school shootings in the United States for which separate articles exist. The entries are organized first by the number of fatalities, and then by the number of injuries and date of occurrence. Incidents listed here occurred at a variety of institutions, including elementary schools, middle schools, high schools, colleges, universities, and trade schools.

School shootings have occurred in the United States since the mid-19th century, although they were relatively uncommon until around the late 20th century. From the 1960s through the 1980s, fatal school shootings occurred infrequently, with most involving one or two victims. Since the 1990s, however, the frequency and lethality of such incidents have increased, coinciding with a broader rise in mass shootings. The Columbine High School massacre of 1999, which resulted in 16 deaths, including the perpetrators, is often cited as a turning point in media coverage and public perception of school shootings. It influenced subsequent security policies and cultural discussions around youth violence.

School shootings in the United States by death toll (with four or more fatalities including perpetrators)

The deadliest school shooting in US history took place on April 16, 2007, at Virginia Tech in Blacksburg, Virginia, where 33 people, including the perpetrator, were killed and 23 others injured. Other high-fatality incidents include the Sandy Hook Elementary School shooting in 2012 in Newtown, Connecticut, with 28 deaths (including the perpetrator and his mother); the Robb Elementary School shooting in 2022 in Uvalde, Texas, with 22 deaths (including the perpetrator); and the Parkland high school shooting in 2018 in Parkland, Florida, which left 17 dead. These incidents are among the deadliest school shootings in United States history.

Between 2000 and 2022, more than 300 school shootings occurred in the United States, although only a small fraction resulted in multiple fatalities. While the majority of incidents involve fewer than three deaths, a small number of high-profile cases account for a significant proportion of fatalities. Mass-casualty events have occurred more frequently at high schools and universities than at elementary schools, although some of the deadliest shootings, such as Sandy Hook and Robb Elementary, involved younger students.

The recurrence of school shootings has generated debate over a range of issues, including firearms legislation, mental health care, media coverage, and school security measures. Responses have included the implementation of school resource officers, lockdown and active-shooter drills, metal detectors, and, in some states, laws permitting school staff to carry firearms. Legislative proposals at both the federal and state levels have varied, from expanded background checks and age restrictions to measures allowing armed teachers.

== List ==
This table is organized first by deaths, then injuries, and then dates.

List of school shootings by death toll
Date	Location	Deaths	Injuries	Description
April 16, 2007	Blacksburg, Virginia	33 (Note: Including the perpetrator)	23 (Note: 17 from gunfire, 6 from jumping out of windows)	Virginia Tech shooting: 23-year-old student Seung-Hui Cho killed thirty-two students and faculty members in two separate attacks on the campus of Virginia Tech and then committed suicide. In a dorm room, he first shot one student, then another who came to help; two hours later, he went to a school building, where he barricaded the main entrance and opened fire into several classrooms, killing twenty-seven students and five faculty members and wounding seventeen others.
December 14, 2012	Newtown, Connecticut	28	2	Sandy Hook Elementary School shooting: 20-year-old former student Adam Lanza killed twenty-six other people and himself at Sandy Hook Elementary School. He had first killed his mother at their home before taking four of her guns and driving to his former elementary school. He killed twenty first-grade children aged six and seven, along with six adults, including four teachers, the principal, and the school psychologist. Two other people were injured. Lanza killed himself as police arrived at the school.
May 24, 2022	Uvalde, Texas	22	21 (Note: 18 directly, including the perpetrator's grandmother at her home; 3 minor injuries during civilian conflicts with police)	Uvalde school shooting: 18-year-old former student Salvador Ramos killed twenty-one people at Robb Elementary School. He had first shot and wounded his grandmother at their home before driving to the school. Ramos entered a pair of adjoining classrooms and killed 19 students aged nine and eleven and two teachers. He was killed by law enforcement after remaining in the classroom for more than an hour. Eighteen other people were injured by gunfire, and two officers received minor injuries.
February 14, 2018	Parkland, Florida	17	18	Parkland high school shooting: 19-year-old former student Nikolas Cruz killed 17 people at Marjory Stoneman Douglas High School. Prior to the shooting, he had been expelled from the school. Armed with a semi-automatic rifle, Cruz activated the fire alarm, and opened fire on students and staff in Building 12. Fourteen students and three staff members were killed, and 17 others were injured. Cruz blended in with the fleeing students and was arrested about an hour later in a nearby residential area near Coral Springs. He later pleaded guilty to 17 counts of murder and 17 counts of attempted murder.
August 1, 1966	Austin, Texas	16 (Note: Including an unborn infant) (Note: In addition, two others were killed by stabbing)	31	University of Texas tower shooting: 25-year-old engineering student and former U.S. Marine Charles Whitman killed 16 people in Austin, Texas. Earlier that day, he murdered his wife and mother at their homes. He then ascended the clock tower at the University of Texas at Austin, killing three people inside the tower before opening fire from the observation deck. Over the next 96 minutes, he killed 12 more people and wounded 31 others. Whitman was shot and killed by police. Apart from remaining the deadliest shooting at a college campus until the Virginia Tech shooting in 2007, this was also the deadliest American mass shooting altogether for nearly 18 years until the San Ysidro McDonald's massacre.
April 20, 1999	Columbine, Colorado	16 (Note: Including both perpetrators) (Note: Including a victim who died in 2025)	23 (Note: 20 by gunfire, 3 from trying to escape)	Columbine High School massacre: 18-year-old Eric Harris and 17-year-old Dylan Klebold, students at Columbine High School, killed twelve students and one teacher; after killing two students in the schoolyard and fatally wounding a teacher in the hallway, they killed the rest of their victims in the school library. They also wounded 21 additional people (twelve in the library and nine elsewhere), started fires, and engaged in several gunfights with police, though no one was hit in these exchanges. Another three people injured themselves attempting to escape the school. The pair committed suicide at the end of the massacre. In 2025, one of the injured, Anne Marie Hochhalter, died from the injuries she sustained in the shooting.
July 26, 1764	Greencastle, Pennsylvania	11	1	Enoch Brown school massacre: Perhaps the earliest shooting to happen in school or college property in what would become the United States was the notorious Enoch Brown school massacre during the Pontiac's War. Four Delaware (Lenape) American Indians entered the schoolhouse near present-day Greencastle, Pennsylvania, and shot and killed schoolmaster Enoch Brown and nine children (reports vary). Only one child survived. However, this incident may only incidentally be considered a school shooting because only the teacher was shot, while the other victims were killed with melee weapons.
May 18, 2018	Santa Fe, Texas	10	14	2018 Santa Fe High School shooting: 17-year-old student Dimitrios Pagourtzis opened fire at Santa Fe High School, killing ten people and injuring at least thirteen others. He was armed with a shotgun and a .38 caliber revolver, both stolen from his father. Pagourtzis was taken into custody by law enforcement at the scene. Authorities later found multiple improvised explosive devices and pipe bombs planted around the school.
March 21, 2005	Red Lake, Minnesota	10	9	2005 Red Lake shootings: 16-year-old student Jeff Weise killed his grandfather and grandfather's girlfriend at their home, where he had been living, at the Red Lake Indian Reservation. He then drove to Red Lake Senior High School. Armed with his grandfather's police weapons, Weise killed five students, one teacher, and one security guard, and wounded at least nine others, before committing suicide after being wounded in a shootout with police.
October 1, 2015	Roseburg, Oregon	10	8	2015 Umpqua Community College shooting: Christopher Harper-Mercer, a 26-year-old student at Umpqua Community College, entered a classroom on the Roseburg campus and opened fire. He killed eight students and one instructor and injured eight others. Witnesses reported that Harper-Mercer initially asked students about their religious beliefs before shooting, suggesting a deliberate targeting of individuals. During the attack, he barricaded the classroom door and moved between rooms, firing at multiple people. Law enforcement officers arrived quickly, and Harper-Mercer engaged in a brief exchange of gunfire before taking his own life.
May 23, 2014 (Note: Sources classifying the Isla Vista attacks as a school shooting: ABC News, ABC13 Houston, Anadolu Agency, Associated Press, Atlanta News First, CNN, Fox 26 Houston, NBC 7 San Diego, NBC10 Boston, PBS, Sky News, Deseret News, Los Angeles Daily News, New York Daily News, Rolling Stone, Salon.com, The Conversation, The Times of India, Westword.)	Isla Vista, California	7 (Note: 3 by stabbing; 4 by gunfire, including the perpetrator)	14 (Note: 7 by gunfire, 7 struck by motor vehicle)	Isla Vista attacks: 22-year-old former college student Elliot Rodger first attacked his two roommates and their friend in his apartment, ambushing and stabbing them to death one at a time as they arrived at different times. After the stabbings, he drove around Isla Vista, California, near the campus of the University of California, Santa Barbara (UCSB), shooting at people and using his vehicle to ram others, ultimately killing three more people by gunfire before committing suicide with a gunshot to the head. The attacks ended with six people getting killed, all of whom were University of California, Santa Barbara, students.
October 2, 2006	Nickel Mines, Pennsylvania	7	4	West Nickel Mines School shooting: Charles Carl Roberts IV, a 32-year-old milk truck driver, entered the West Nickel Mines School, an Amish one-room schoolhouse in Pennsylvania, armed with a handgun and several magazines of ammunition. He took ten girls' hostage before opening fire, killing five female students aged 6 to 13 and injuring five others. One of the injured later died from her injuries in 2024. Roberts subsequently committed suicide at the scene. After the shooting, K-Y Jelly, a lubricant often used as an aid to sexual intercourse, was found in the schoolhouse among Roberts' belongings, possibly suggesting an ulterior motive for the incident.
April 2, 2012	Oakland, California	7	3	2012 Oikos University shooting: 43-year-old One L. Goh was accused of shooting dead seven students with a handgun and wounding three others at Oikos University, a Christian college. He fled the scene, stealing a victim's car, and was apprehended hours later nearby. Goh was charged with seven counts of murder. In January 2013, Goh was determined to be mentally unfit for trial and committed for treatment. On July 14, 2017, Goh was sentenced to seven consecutive life sentences plus 271 years in prison, all without any possibility of parole. In March 2019, Goh died in prison.
July 12, 1976	Fullerton, California	7	2	1976 California State University, Fullerton massacre: 37-year-old custodian Edward Charles Allaway opened fire at the California State University, Fullerton library on July 12, 1976. He killed seven people and wounded two others in the first-floor lobby and in the Instructional Media Center located in the basement. Allaway was later arrested at his home after the shooting.
March 27, 2023	Nashville, Tennessee	7	2	2023 Nashville school shooting: 28-year-old Aiden Hale (formerly known as Audrey Elizabeth Hale), a former student of The Covenant School, entered the institution armed with three firearms: a LeadStar Arms Grunt-15 5.56mm/.223 caliber semi-automatic AR pistol, a KelTec Sub 2000 9mm caliber carbine, and a Smith & Wesson M&P Shield 2.0 9mm caliber semi-automatic pistol. Hale shot through a glass door to gain entry to the school and proceeded to the second floor, where he killed three 9-year-old students and three staff members. He was fatally shot by responding police officers approximately 14 minutes after the initial 911 call.
January 17, 1989	Stockton, California	6	31	Stockton schoolyard shooting: On January 17, 1989, 24-year-old Patrick Edward Purdy opened fire outside Cleveland Elementary School in Stockton, California, targeting a playground filled with children. Purdy fatally shot five students and injured 31 others, most of whom were children of Southeast Asian refugees. He used an AK-47-style rifle and was armed with additional firearms during the attack and committed suicide at the scene. The shooting was the deadliest elementary school attack in U.S. history at the time and remained the largest until the Sandy Hook Elementary School shooting in 2012.
February 14, 2008	DeKalb, Illinois	6	21	2008 Northern Illinois University shooting: 27-year-old Steven Kazmierczak, a former student not enrolled at the time, entered a lecture hall in Cole Hall armed with a shotgun and a .22-caliber semi-automatic pistol. He opened fire on students and faculty, killing five and injuring 21, before dying by suicide at the scene. Investigators found notes and photographs indicating careful planning. Kazmierczak had a history of mental health issues, including depression and anxiety, and had received psychiatric treatment. The attack prompted immediate campus lockdowns and led to reviews of university security protocols, emergency response procedures, and mental health support policies.
November 14, 2017	Rancho Tehama, California	6	18	Rancho Tehama shootings: 43-year-old Kevin Neal injured one student at Rancho Tehama Elementary School and fatally shot five adults at several locations. The secretary heard the gunfire near the school and ordered the school to go on lockdown. After a custodian and the teachers put it into action, Neal rammed a truck into the gate of the school and fired at the classrooms, hitting one student when a bullet pierced the wall. Neal fatally shot himself after sheriff's deputies rammed his vehicle during a pursuit.
July 7, 2016	Dallas, Texas	6	11	2016 shooting of Dallas police officers: After killing four police officers during a protest, a gunman fled into the nearby El Centro College and got into a shootout with officers, wounding two, before firing out of a window and killing a fifth police officer. After an hours-long standoff, police killed the gunman with a bomb robot.
June 7, 2013	Santa Monica, California	6	4	2013 Santa Monica shootings: 23-year-old John Zawahri began a killing spree at his home. After killing his 55-year-old father, Samir "Sam" Zawahri, and 25-year-old brother, Chris Zawahri, he set the house ablaze. Dressed all in black with body armor and wielding an AR-15-type semi-automatic rifle, Zawahri carjacked 41-year-old Laura Siska, shooting 50-year-old Debra Fine as she attempted to intervene, before forcing Siska to drive to Santa Monica College. Upon arriving on the college campus, Zawahri began shooting at passing vehicles, including a police car and a city bus, leaving three people with minor injuries. Zawahri next targeted a Ford Explorer, killing the driver, 68-year-old campus groundskeeper Carlos Navarro Franco, and fatally wounding the passenger, his 26-year-old daughter Marcela Diaz-Franco, a student at the college, who died two days later. 68-year-old Margarita Gomez, who was collecting cans outside the library, died after being shot in the abdomen and chest. Zawahri opened fire on students who were trying to run away. It ended at the college library where he opened fire on students studying for finals, before being fatally wounded in an exchange of gunfire with responding police officers.
December 5, 2023	Austin, Texas	6	3	2023 Central Texas shootings: 34-year-old Shane James Jr. killed his parents in Bexar County, then committed multiple shootings in Austin, including injuring a school resource officer outside Northeast Early College High School (which triggered a lockdown), a double homicide in a residential area, injuring a cyclist, and injuring another officer during a burglary response. James was arrested after a police chase.
November 1, 1991	Iowa City, Iowa	6	1	1991 University of Iowa shooting: 28-year-old former graduate student Gang Lu killed four members of University of Iowa's faculty and a research student, and seriously wounded another student. 47-year-old professor of physics and astronomy Christoph K. Goertz, 45-year-old associate professor of physics and astronomy Robert Alan Smith, 44-year-old chairman of the physics and astronomy department Dwight R. Nicholson, and 56-year-old associate vice president for academic affairs Dr. Theresa Anne Cleary were shot in the head and died the following day, and 27-year-old research investigator in physics and astronomy Dr. Shan Linhua. 23-year-old Miya Rodolfo-Sioson, Dr. Cleary's temporary student receptionist in the grievance office, survived but was left paralyzed from the neck down. Lu then shot himself in the head and died shortly after police arrived.
March 24, 1998	Craighead County, Arkansas	5	10	1998 Westside Middle School shooting: 13-year-old Mitchell Johnson and 11-year-old Andrew Golden carried out a shooting at Westside Middle School. Golden set off a fire alarm to evacuate students from classrooms, and the pair opened fire with rifles and handguns as people exited the building. They killed a teacher and four students and wounded ten others. The attack was carried out by two of the youngest school shooters in U.S. history.
October 24, 2014	(Washington (state)) Marysville, Washington	5	3	2014 Marysville Pilchuck High School shooting: 15-year-old freshman Jaylen Fryberg opened fire in the school cafeteria of Marysville Pilchuck High School. He fatally shot four students and wounded one other before committing suicide. The shooting was sudden and occurred during lunchtime, targeting peers with whom Fryberg had social connections. Investigators found that Fryberg brought a handgun to school, and the attack lasted only minutes, ending when he took his own life.
October 15, 2026	Bend, Oregon	5	2	2026 Silver Rail Elementary School shooting: 16-year-old John Griffin opened fire with a shotgun at a truck outside Silver Rail Elementary School before shooting his way inside the school. He was killed by a 36-year-old parent who entered the school with his own firearm and engaged the shooter. Three students and a teacher were killed and two other people were wounded.
November 12, 1966	Mesa, Arizona	5	2	1966 Rose-Mar College of Beauty shooting: 18-year-old Robert Benjamin Smith took seven people hostage at Rose-Mar College of Beauty and ordered them to lie down in a circle. He shot each in the head. Four women and a 3-year-old girl died; a woman and a baby were injured but survived. Police arrested Smith, who reportedly admired Richard Speck and Charles Whitman.
May 6, 1940	South Pasadena, California	5	2	1940 South Pasadena Junior High School shooting: Outraged by his dismissal following conflicts with other staff, 38-year-old Verlin H. Spencer shot and killed 62-year-old superintendent of the South Pasadena city schools George C. Bush, 50-year-old principal of South Pasadena High School John E. Alman, and 52-year-old School District business manager Will R. Speer. He then attempted to kill Bush's secretary, 32-year-old Dorothea Talbert; she was struck near the shoulder. He later shot and killed 45-year-old art teacher Ruth Sturgeon, with whom he had been in conflict, fatally wounding her in the chest and, following an intense struggle, 35-year-old mechanical arts teacher Verner V. Vanderlip, another with whom he had a grievance. Spencer was cornered by police as he attempted to escape through the school cafeteria; as one officer aimed, Spencer pressed the .22 caliber automatic pistol against his right side and fired twice, critically wounding himself. Police later found a suicide note from Spencer to his wife, Polly. He survived his wounds and was tried for murder. Pleading guilty to all charges, he received 5 consecutive life terms. He was discharged from California's Department of Correction in 1977, aged 75. Verlin Spencer died January 11, 1991.
September 22, 1988	Chicago, Illinois	5	2	1988 Chicago shootings: 40-year-old Clem "Clemmie" Henderson killed store owner, John Van Dyke and employee, Robert Quinn at a nearby auto parts store, and injured nearby garbage man, Laplose Chestnut Jr. Henderson then approached Moses Montefiore Academy, where he shot and killed the school custodian, Arthur Baker, who was outside of the school. Henderson then entered the school, where he shot and killed police officer Irma Ruiz and wounded her partner, Greg Jaglowski. Despite being shot in both legs, Jaglowski managed to return fire, killing Henderson.
May 21, 1998	Springfield, Oregon	4	25	1998 Thurston High School shooting: 15-year-old Kip Kinkel killed his parents at their home before driving to Thurston High School in Springfield, Oregon, armed with a .22-caliber semi-automatic pistol. Once on campus, he opened fire in classrooms and hallways, targeting students at random. Two students were killed, and 25 others were wounded, some critically. The attack caused chaos as students and staff attempted to flee or hide during the shooting. Kinkel was eventually subdued by students. He later pleaded guilty to multiple counts of murder and attempted murder and was sentenced to 111 years in prison.
December 30, 1974	(New York (state)) Olean, New York	4	11 (Note: 7 by gunfire, 4 others from flying glass fragments)	1974 Olean High School shooting: 17-year-old student Anthony F. Barbaro entered Olean High School and proceeded to the third-floor student council room. He broke out windows and opened fire on people in the street below. Four people were killed, including a woman who was eight months pregnant, and eleven others were wounded, seven of them by gunfire.
May 1, 1992	Olivehurst, California	4	10	1992 Lindhurst High School shooting: Former student 20-year-old Eric Houston killed three students and one teacher and wounded nine other students and a teacher before surrendering to police.
May 4, 1970	Kent, Ohio	4	9	Kent State shootings: During protests of the Vietnam War at Kent State University, armed National Guard Soldiers opened fire on unarmed students, killing four people.
September 4, 2024	(Georgia (U.S. state)) Winder, Georgia	4	9	2024 Apalachee High School shooting: 14-year-old freshman Colt Gray carried out a shooting at Apalachee High School. The attack lasted approximately six minutes, during which Gray used an AR-style semi-automatic rifle to fatally shoot two students and two teachers, and wound nine others. Two teachers and seven students suffered gunshot injuries. Gray then surrendered to school resource officers inside the building.
December 13, 2025	Providence, Rhode Island	4 (Note: Including the perpetrator and another victim who both died off campus)	9	2025 Brown University shooting: Brown University is a prestigious Ivy League university in the College Hill neighborhood of Providence, Rhode Island. On December 13, 2025, during the second day of the final examination week for the fall semester, a lone gunman entered Barus and Holley Room 166, killing two students and wounding nine others as they attended a review session for the Principles of Economics course in preparation for final exams. Investigators believe that the same gunman later fatally shot Nuno Loureiro, a physics professor at Massachusetts Institute of Technology, in his apartment on December 16. The shooter was identified as Claudio Manuel Neves Valente, a 48-year-old man who was in the physics PhD program at Brown from 2000 to 2001 and attended the same university as Loureiro in Portugal. He was later found dead in a storage unit, off campus on December 18.
November 30, 2021	Oxford, Michigan	4	7	2021 Oxford High School shooting: 15-year-old student Ethan Crumbley opened fire with a 9mm semi-automatic pistol at Oxford High School. Four students were killed and seven others, including a teacher, were wounded; with one of the injured victims later dying from their injuries at the hospital. Crumbley was taken into custody without incident. The firearm used in the attack had been purchased days earlier by his father. He later pleaded guilty to murder and terrorism charges and was sentenced to life imprisonment without parole.
February 13, 2023	East Lansing, Michigan	4	5	2023 Michigan State University shooting: 43-year-old Anthony Dwayne McRae, opened fire on the Michigan State University campus in East Lansing, Michigan. He killed three students and wounded five others before fleeing the scene. Several hours later, McRae died by suicide when confronted by police.
December 6, 2023	Las Vegas, Nevada	4	3	2023 University of Nevada, Las Vegas shooting: 67-year-old Anthony Polito, who had previously worked at the University of Nevada, Las Vegas as an adjunct professor, opened fire on the campus. He killed three faculty members and injured three other people, including two responding police officers. Polito was shot and killed by other responding officers at the scene.
October 28, 2002	Tucson, Arizona	4	0	2002 University of Arizona shooting: Failing nursing college student and Gulf War veteran 40-year-old Robert Stewart Flores, Jr. killed three assistant professors of nursing at the University of Arizona, 50-year-old Robin Rogers, 44-year-old Cheryl McGaffic, and 45-year-old Barbara Monroe, before turning the gun on himself.
August 27, 2025	Minneapolis, Minnesota	3	30 (Note: Includes one person who sustained a non-gunshot wound.)	2025 Annunciation Catholic Church shooting: A gunman opened fire at Annunciation Catholic School during morning mass, killing two and injuring 30 others.
February 8, 1968	Orangeburg, South Carolina	3	28	Orangeburg Massacre: On the night of February 8, 1968, approximately 200 African American students gathered on the campus of South Carolina State College to protest the segregation of the All-Star Bowling Lane. During the demonstration, South Carolina Highway Patrol officers opened fire on the crowd, killing three students—Samuel Hammond Jr., Henry Smith, and Delano Middleton—and injuring 28 others. The incident, known as the Orangeburg Massacre, marked the first instance of college students being killed by police during a protest in the United States.
February 24, 1984	Los Angeles, California	3	12	49th Street Elementary School shooting: Tyrone Mitchell killed two people and wounded twelve others when shooting at students leaving 49th Street Elementary School. He then committed suicide.
October 1, 1997	Pearl, Mississippi	3	7	1997 Pearl High School shooting: 16-year-old Luke Woodham murdered his 50-year-old mother, Mary, at home before killing his ex-girlfriend, 16-year-old student Christina Menefee, and 17-year-old student Lydia Kaye Dew, then wounding seven others at Pearl High School. Woodham was sentenced to life in prison.
October 24, 2022	St Louis, Missouri	3	7	2022 Central Visual and Performing Arts High School shooting: A 19-year-old man armed with a semi-automatic rifle entered the Central Visual and Performing Arts High School just after 9 am and opened fire. At least two people were killed, and seven others were injured. The shooter was killed in an exchange of gunfire with police.
December 1, 1997	West Paducah, Kentucky	3	6	1997 Heath High School shooting: Three students were killed and six wounded by 14-year-old Michael Carneal as they participated in a prayer circle. Carneal was sentenced to life in prison with the possibility of parole after 25 years.
January 4, 2024	Perry, Iowa	3	6	2024 Perry High School shooting: One student was killed, and four other students and three staff members were injured. The principal later died of his injuries. The shooter, a 17-year-old student at the school, committed suicide.
December 16, 2024	Madison, Wisconsin	3	6	2024 Abundant Life Christian School shooting: One teacher and two students (including the shooter) were killed and six others were injured after a shooting at Abundant Life Christian School.
January 16, 2002	Grundy, Virginia	3	3	2002 Appalachian School of Law shooting: Recently dismissed graduate student 42-year-old Peter Odighizuwa killed three people at the Appalachian School of Law: 42-year-old dean Anthony Sutin, 41-year-old professor Thomas Blackwell, and 33-year-old student Angela Dales. Three other students were also wounded. In 2005 Odighizuwa received three life sentences and an additional 28 years without the possibility of parole.
February 12, 2010	Huntsville, Alabama	3	3	2010 University of Alabama in Huntsville shooting: During a biology department meeting, 44-year-old professor denied tenure Amy Bishop opened fire, killing three and wounding three others. Bishop was pushed out of the room by the survivors when her gun ran out of ammo. After being arrested without incident outside the building, she denied that the shooting even happened. In 1986, Bishop shot and killed her brother in Braintree, Massachusetts, which local police ruled an accident. In 1993, Bishop and her husband were questioned after a pipe bomb threat incident toward her lab supervisor.
February 27, 2012	Chardon, Ohio	3	3	2012 Chardon High School shooting: 17-year-old Thomas "T. J." Lane fired ten shots from a semi-automatic handgun at a group of students sitting in the cafeteria. He killed three boys (one 16-year-old died immediately, two the day after) and wounded three others. Lane was arrested early the next morning standing near his car. He was charged as an adult with murder, attempted murder, and firearms offenses. In March 2013, he was sentenced to three life sentences without parole.
November 14, 2019	Santa Clarita, California	3	3	2019 Saugus High School shooting: Five people were shot, two fatally, at a courtyard of Saugus High School. The shooter, a 16-year-old male student, attempted suicide by shooting himself in the head. He was taken into custody and died the next day during hospitalization. The gun used was suspected by police to be a privately made firearm.
November 13, 2022	Charlottesville, Virginia	3	2	2022 University of Virginia shooting: A student at the University of Virginia shot several students, killing three. The gunman was a former member of the university's football team, and several of the victims, including all three of the deceased, were current members of the team.
February 2, 1996	(Washington (state)) Moses Lake, Washington	3	1	1996 Frontier Middle School shooting: 14-year-old Barry Loukaitis killed a teacher and two students and wounded another student when he opened fire on his algebra class.
April 10, 2017	San Bernardino, California	3	1	2017 North Park Elementary School shooting: Cedric Anderson, age 53, of Riverside, California, died of a self-inflicted gunshot wound after shooting and killing his estranged wife, Karen Elaine Smith, age 53, in a classroom. An eight-year-old student was also fatally shot, and a seven-year-old student was injured.
November 26, 1985	(Washington (state)) Spanaway, Washington	3	0	Spanaway Junior High School shooting: Armed with a .22-caliber rifle, 14-year-old Heather Smith shot and killed 15-year-old Gordon Pickett, her ex-boyfriend, and 14-year-old Christopher Ricco outside the gymnasium at Spanaway Junior High School, before fleeing the school grounds. After a two-hour manhunt, she returned to the school. After a short standoff with police, she shot herself in the right temple; she died the following day.
August 15, 1996	San Diego, California	3	0	1996 San Diego State University shooting: At San Diego State University, 36-year-old graduate student Frederick Martin Davidson killed three professors - 32-year-old Chen Liang, 44-year-old D. Preston Lowrey III, and 36-year-old Costas Lyrintzis - whom he believed were involved in a conspiracy against him. Davidson was sentenced to serve three life terms without parole.
June 1, 2016	Los Angeles, California	3	0	2016 UCLA shooting: Mainak Sarkar, age 38, a Ph.D. student, killed his former professor, William S. Klug, age 39, a professor of mechanical and aerospace engineering, in an engineering building at UCLA. Sarkar then killed himself. Sarkar, who lived in Minnesota, also killed his ex-wife, Ashley Hasti, age 31, in her Brooklyn Park, Minnesota home.
December 7, 2017	Aztec, New Mexico	3	0	2017 Aztec High School shooting: William Atchison, 21-year-old former student sneaked into Aztec High School disguised as a student and hid in a washroom with a Glock 9mm handgun in his bag. He retreated after being spotted by a school custodian who chased him shouting "active shooter" and "lockdown". Atchinson killed two students who were caught in the hallway before he killed himself. He had been investigated in 2016 by the FBI when he asked "where to find cheap assault rifles for a mass shooting" on an online forum.
September 30, 1962	Oxford, Mississippi	2	300+	Ole Miss riot of 1962: During riots opposing the court-ordered enrollment of James Meredith, segregationist protesters clashed with federal marshals and U.S. Army troops on the University of Mississippi campus. Gunfire was exchanged during the unrest, resulting in the deaths of two civilians and injuries to hundreds, primarily law enforcement personnel.
May 16, 1986	Cokeville, Wyoming	2	79	1986 Cokeville Elementary School hostage crisis: David and Doris Young took 154 hostages (136 children and 18 adults) using firearms and a gasoline bomb. After a two-and-a-half-hour standoff, the bomb was accidentally detonated. Doris Young was severely injured, and David Young then shot and killed her before fatally shooting himself. No hostages were killed, though 79 sustained injuries, mostly from burns and smoke inhalation.
May 21, 1969	Greensboro, North Carolina	2	27	1969 Greensboro uprising: Civil rights uprising sparked by student election disputes at Dudley High School escalated into riots with exchanges of gunfire between protesters/students and police/National Guard on A&T campus; 2 killed (including student Willie Grimes) and dozens injured in shoot-outs from May 21 to May 25.
January 23, 2018	Benton, Kentucky	2	18	2018 Marshall County High School shooting: Gabriel Ross Parker, a 15-year-old male student shot 16 people in the lobby at Marshall County High School and caused non-gunshot injuries to four others. Two 15-year-old students died: one killed at the scene, another died of wounds at Vanderbilt Medical Center.
June 6, 2023	Richmond, Virginia	2	17	2023 Richmond shooting: Seven people were shot, two fatally, after a high school graduation ceremony was held on the campus of Virginia Commonwealth University.
March 5, 2001	Santee, California	2	13	2001 Santana High School shooting: 15-year-old student Charles Andrew Williams killed two students, 14-year-old Bryan Zuckor and 17-year-old Randy Gordon, at Santana High School. In total, he wounded thirteen others. Williams was arrested and convicted of murder and attempted murder. He was sentenced to life with the chance of parole after serving 50 years.
May 15, 1970	Jackson, Mississippi	2	12	Jackson State killings: During a student protest addressing racial tensions and the Vietnam War, law enforcement officers opened fire on the campus of Jackson State College. Two students, Phillip Gibbs and James Green, were killed, and at least twelve others were injured. The event is known as the Jackson State killings and is recognized as a notable instance of campus unrest in the United States during this period.
January 29, 1979	San Diego, California	2	9	Cleveland Elementary School shooting: On January 29, 1979, a gunman opened fire at Grover Cleveland Elementary School in San Diego, California, United States. The principal and a custodian were killed; eight children and a police officer were injured. A 16-year-old girl, Brenda Spencer, who lived in a house across the street from the school, was convicted of the shootings. Charged as an adult, she pleaded guilty to two counts of murder and assault with a deadly weapon, and was sentenced to life in prison with a chance of parole after 25 years. As of 2025, she is still in prison.
September 26, 1988	Greenwood, South Carolina	2	9	1988 Oakland Elementary School shooting: 19-year-old James William Wilson Jr. entered the school during lunch, opened fire in the cafeteria, reloaded in a restroom, then continued into a classroom. He killed two 8-year-old students (Shequila Bradley, who died at the scene; Tequila Thomas, who died three days later) and wounded nine others, including students, a first-grade teacher, and a physical education teacher.
September 27, 2006	Bailey, Colorado	2	7 (Note: Via sexual assault)	2006 Platte Canyon High School hostage crisis: 53-year-old drifter, Duane Roger Morrison, walked into Platte Canyon High School and took six girls hostage. During the ensuing siege, Morrison sexually assaulted all of the girls. When a SWAT team stormed the classroom, Morrison killed 16-year-old Emily Keyes, then took his own life after being shot and wounded by police.
April 17, 2025	Tallahassee, Florida	2	7	2025 Florida State University shooting: Phoenix Ikner, a 20-year-old student and stepson of a sheriff’s deputy, opened fire outside the Student Union building with a handgun. Two people were killed and six others wounded by gunfire; additional individuals were injured while fleeing. A shotgun the shooter carried failed to discharge.
May 20, 1988	Winnetka, Illinois	2	5	1988 Winnetka attacks: Laurie Dann, a 30-year-old woman with a history of mental illness, entered a second-grade classroom and opened fire, killing 8-year-old Nicholas Corwin and wounding five other children. She then took a family hostage, injuring one person before fatally shooting herself.
December 14, 1992	Great Barrington, Massachusetts	2	4	1992 Bard College at Simon's Rock shooting: Wayne Lo, a Taiwanese-born American, opened fire at Bard College at Simon's Rock. He killed one student and a professor and wounded four people. Lo was sentenced to life in prison without parole for the murders.
April 30, 2019	Charlotte, North Carolina	2	4	2019 University of North Carolina at Charlotte shooting: A shooter on the University of North Carolina at Charlotte campus shot six people, killing two and injuring four on the last day of classes. Riley Howell, a student in the classroom, was credited with stopping the shooter.
September 28, 2016	Townville, South Carolina	2	3	2016 Townville Elementary School shooting: Three students and a teacher were wounded after 14-year-old Jesse Osborne opened fire at Townville Elementary School. The perpetrator's father was found dead at his home soon after the shooting. One of the victims, six-year-old Jacob Hall, died 3 days after the shooting.
February 19, 1997	Bethel, Alaska	2	2	1997 Bethel Regional High School shooting: 16-year-old student Evan Ramsey killed Bethel Regional High School principal Ron Edwards and 15-year-old student Joshua Palacios and wounded two other students. After a brief shootout with a responding police officer, Ramsey surrendered. He was later sentenced to 198 years in prison.
October 21, 2013	Sparks, Nevada	2	2	2013 Sparks Middle School shooting: 12-year-old seventh-grade student Jose Reyes opened fire with a handgun at the basketball courts of Sparks Middle School, injuring one student in the shoulder. Michael Landsberry, a teacher and veteran, tried to intervene and was killed by Reyes. Reyes also wounded a student trying to help the teacher. Reyes then committed suicide by shooting himself in the head. The shooting happened before classes, and the school was evacuated and was closed for the week.
January 22, 2025	Nashville, Tennessee	2	2 (Note: 1 by gunfire, 1 by facial injury from a fall)	2025 Antioch High School shooting: A 17-year-old male student shot and killed a 16-year-old girl and injured another student in the cafeteria of Antioch High School. Another student received a facial injury from a fall.
March 12, 2026	Norfolk, Virginia	2	2	2026 Old Dominion University shooting: 36-year-old Mohamed Bailor Jalloh attacked a Reserve Officers' Training Corps (ROTC) group, yelling "Allahu Akbar" while opening fire. One ROTC instructor was killed and two ROTC cadets were critically injured before Jalloh was fatally stabbed as other members of the ROTC group subdued him.
October 12, 1995	Blackville, South Carolina	2	1	1995 Blackville–Hilda High School shooting: Suspended student 16-year-old Toby R. Sincino killed 56-year-old math teacher Phyllis Senn and wounded 38-year-old math teacher Johnny Thompson before committing suicide at Blackville-Hilda High School.
November 15, 1995	Lynnville, Tennessee	2	1	1995 Richland High School shooting: 17-year-old James Rouse killed a student and teacher at Richland High School and seriously wounded another teacher with a rifle. Rouse was later sentenced to life in prison without parole.
October 26, 2008	Conway, Arkansas	2	1	2008 University of Central Arkansas shooting: Four young men fatally shot two students, 18-year-old Ryan Henderson, and 19-year-old Chavares Block, and wounded a 19-year-old campus visitor in the leg, outside the Arkansas Hall dormitory of University of Central Arkansas.
January 18, 1993	Grayson, Kentucky	2	0	1993 East Carter High School shooting: 17-year-old Scott Pennington, a student at East Carter High School, fatally shot his 48-year-old English teacher, Deanna McDavid, and 52-year-old head custodian Marvin Hicks. Pennington was sentenced to life in prison without parole.
August 28, 2000	Fayetteville, Arkansas	2	0	2000 University of Arkansas shooting: 36-year-old James Easton Kelly, a PhD candidate in Comparative Literature at University of Arkansas, killed 67-year-old John R. Locke, the English professor overseeing his coursework. Kelly had been dismissed from this PhD program due to a lack of progress toward his degree. Kelly shot Locke three times before committing suicide in the director's office, which had been isolated by campus police.
September 24, 2003	Cold Spring, Minnesota	2	0	2003 Rocori High School shooting: 15-year-old John Jason McLaughlin shot 15-year-old freshman Seth Bartell and 17-year-old senior Aaron Rollins at Rocori High School. Rollins was killed immediately, and Bartell died from his wounds 16 days later. McLaughlin was sentenced to life in prison with the chance of parole in 2038.
November 10, 2024	Tuskegee, Alabama	1	17	2024 Tuskegee University shooting: One person was killed and 16 others were injured after a shooting during a homecoming event on the Tuskegee University campus.
May 7, 2019	Highlands Ranch, Colorado	1	8 (Note: 6 by the perpetrators, 2 by private contractor security)	STEM School Highlands Ranch shooting: A school shooting was reported at STEM School Highlands Ranch, around 1:50 p.m, two shooters targeted separate locations and killed a student and injured eight more before being arrested.
February 19, 1976	Mid-Wilshire, California	1	7	1976 Computer Learning Center shooting: 18-year-old Neil Liebeskind of Chatsworth, California entered a Los Angeles computer school and opened fire on his class with a 12-gauge shotgun, killing 24-year-old Fernando E. Alcivar and wounding 6 others, in an attempt to kill another student. After Liebeskind left the classroom, he was confronted by an armed security officer, Howard Barnes, who ordered him to drop his weapon. Liebeskind shot and wounded Barnes, but Barnes and a second security guard returned fire and critically wounded Liebeskind with a shot to the neck. Liebeskind had previously been shot and wounded by a homeowner four years earlier while burglarizing a house in Woodland Hills, California. In January 1977, a jury found Liebeskind not guilty by reason of insanity and he was confined to a psychiatric hospital. The shooting disrupted a filming of the television series Jigsaw John.
August 10, 1999	Los Angeles, California	1	5	1999 Los Angeles Jewish Community Center shooting: White supremacist Buford O. Furrow Jr. opened fire with a submachine gun at a Jewish community center day camp, wounding three children, a teenage counselor, and an adult; later murdered postal worker Joseph Ileto in a separate location as part of the same spree.
October 10, 2007	Cleveland, Ohio	1	5	2007 SuccessTech Academy shooting: in downtown Cleveland, 14-year-old student Asa H. Coon shot two students and two teachers in the halls and classrooms on the fourth floor of the building. Coon then moved to another room on the same floor, where he fatally shot himself.
September 28, 2022	Oakland, California	1	5	2022 Oakland school shooting: Six adults were wounded in a shooting at a Rudsdale Newcomer High School, in a block of East Oakland that houses four schools. One victim died of his injuries in November 2022.
November 7, 1994	Wickliffe, Ohio	1	4	1994 Wickliffe Middle School shooting: 37-year-old former student Keith A. Ledeger killed 41-year-old custodian Pete Christopher at Wickliffe Middle School and wounded 47-year-old assistant principal Jim Anderson, 47-year-old police officer Thomas Schmidt, and 50-year-old teacher Lowell Grimm. He then exchanged shots with police before being injured and taken into custody. Ledeger was sentenced to 57 years in prison and died in prison of natural causes in 2011.
April 14, 2003	New Orleans, Louisiana	1	4	2003 John McDonogh High School shooting: 18-year-old Steven Williams, and 17-year-old James Tate, opened fire with an AK-47 and a handgun in the gymnasium of John McDonogh High School, killing a 15-year-old student and wounding three female students. Williams was sentenced to life imprisonment, and Tate was sentenced to fifteen years.
February 11, 1988	Largo, Florida	1	3	1988 Pinellas Park High school shooting: 15-year-old students Jason Harless and Jason McCoy took stolen .38-caliber revolvers to Pinellas Park High School. Harless shot two assistant principals and a student teacher inside the school's cafeteria. 53-year-old Richard Allen died from his injuries; Nancy Blackwelder and intern Joseph Bloznalis were wounded. Harless was shot and wounded during a shootout with police outside the school; McCoy was later apprehended at a residence.
June 5, 2014	(Washington (state)) Seattle, Washington	1	3	2014 Seattle Pacific University shooting: A school shooting that occurred on June 5, 2014, at Seattle Pacific University in Seattle, Washington, United States. A gunman opened fire inside Otto Miller Hall, killing one student and injuring three others before being subdued by a student building monitor using pepper spray.
September 13, 2017	(Washington (state)) Rockford, Washington	1	3	2017 Freeman High School shooting: A 15-year-old male student opened fire inside the school, killing one student and injuring three others before being subdued by a school employee. The incident prompted a lockdown of the school and a large law enforcement response
June 3, 2026	Fairfield, California	1	3	2026 Fairfield High School shooting: On June 3, 2026 a gunman opened fire during a Sem Yeto High School graduation ceremony held at Fairfield High School in Fairfield, California, wounding three people and killing one.
April 24, 1998	Edinboro, Pennsylvania	1	3	1998 Parker Middle School dance shooting: 14-year-old student Andrew Wurst fatally shot 48-year-old teacher John Gillette and wounded two students and another teacher at an 8th-grade graduation dance. He is serving a 30- to 60-year sentence in a prison for young offenders.
October 9, 2015	Flagstaff, Arizona	1	3	2015 Northern Arizona University shooting: One student died and three others were wounded in a shooting at Northern Arizona University. It is unclear what sparked the shooting, which took place near Mountain View Hall, a dormitory that houses most of the campus' students involved in Greek organizations. An 18-year-old student was arrested and charged with murder and aggravated assault.
May 19, 2003	Cleveland, Ohio	1	2	2003 Case Western Reserve University shooting: On May 9, 2003, Biswanath Halder, a 62-year-old business school alumnus of Case Western Reserve University, killed a graduate student, wounded a professor, and another student using a semi-automatic rifle. He held the building and its nearly 100 occupant's hostage for seven hours and exchanged fire with police and SWAT officers several times during the incident before being wounded and apprehended by a SWAT team. He was sentenced to life in prison.
November 8, 2005	Jacksboro, Tennessee	1	2	2005 Campbell County High School shooting: Inside the Campbell County High School office, 15-year-old Kenneth Bartley, shot the schools then principal, Gary Seale. He shot assistant principals Ken Bruce and Jim Pierce. Bruce later died from his wound. Bartley was sentenced to forty-five years in prison with chance of parole after twenty-nine years.
August 30, 2006	Hillsborough, North Carolina	1	2	2006 Orange High School shooting: A school shooting occurred at Orange High School when 18-year-old Alvaro Rafael Castillo, a former student of Orange High School, opened fire at the institution after shooting his father dead at home. After wounding two students (one directly and one by glass shards), his rifle jammed, at which point he was arrested at gunpoint. In 2009, Castillo was found guilty of first-degree murder after a three-week trial and was subsequently sentenced to life in prison with no chance of parole.
March 7, 2022	Des Moines, Iowa	1	2	2022 East High School shooting: Around 2:42 P.M. CST, shooters from multiple vehicles opened fire on a group of teenagers in front of East High School in a drive-by shooting. 3 teenagers, a 15-year-old targeted male, a 16-year-old female, and an 18-year-old female, were shot and transferred to hospitals where they were reported to be in critical condition. The targeted victim died from his injuries shortly thereafter. 6 teenagers were arrested in the following hours and were later charged as adults for murder.
December 4, 2024	Palermo, California	1	2	2024 Feather River School shooting: In a religiously motivated attack, a gunman attacked the Feather River School of the Seventh-Day Adventists, killing himself and injuring two kindergarten students. Both students were taken to the hospital in critical condition.
September 10, 2025	Evergreen, Colorado	1	2	2025 Evergreen High School shooting: Two students were critically injured at Evergreen High School after being shot by a revolver. The perpetrator, 16-year-old male Desmond Holly, then committed suicide by gunshot. One of the victims was discharged from hospital days after the shooting, and another in October. Media coverage of the shooting was vastly overshadowed by the assassination of right-wing activist Charlie Kirk, which happened just two minutes later by coincidence.
September 21, 2007	Dover, Delaware	1	1	2007 Delaware State University shooting: Two 17-year-old Delaware State University freshmen were shot on campus. One died 32 days later on October 23, from critical injuries sustained in the attack. A freshman student from East Orange, New Jersey, Loyer D. Braden, was arrested and charged with murder. However, the charges were dismissed in May 2009 due to a lack of evidence, as well as eyewitnesses saying that Braden was not the shooter.
November 19, 2019	Chicago, Illinois	1	1	Shooting of Ryan Wilder: Police from Des Plaines pursued a bank robbery suspect into UpBeat Music and Arts, a music school in Chicago's Old Irving Park neighborhood. The bank robber and police engaged in a shootout, during which the bank robber was killed and a teenager interning at the school was shot in the arm by police. Prior to entering the school, the bank robber also shot and wounded a Chicago Police officer.
December 9, 2025	Frankfort, Kentucky	1	1	2025 Kentucky State University shooting: A 48-year-old father of a student at the university fired a handgun during a dispute. A 19-year-old student was killed and another student was critically injured. The perpetrator was charged with murder and first-degree assault.
November 15, 1840	Charlottesville, Virginia	1	0	Shooting of John A. G. Davis: In November 1840, John A. G. Davis, a professor and faculty chairman at the University of Virginia, attempted to quell disorder among masked students firing pistols near faculty residences. He was shot by one of the students (Joseph G. Semmes) and died two days later from his wound.
November 1, 1853	Louisville, Kentucky	1	0	Murder of William Butler: Matthews Ward shot and killed schoolmaster William H. Butler with a pistol during a confrontation over the prior corporal punishment of Ward's younger brother; motivated by family honor and anger over discipline. Butler died the next day.
March 29, 1918	Jefferson City, Missouri	1	0	Romeo West: Romeo West was fatally shot during a personal duel with fellow employee Theodore Martin following a dispute; occurred on institute grounds.
February 29, 2000	Flint, Michigan	1	0	Killing of Kayla Rolland: At Buell Elementary School, a 6-year-old boy fatally shot 6-year-old girl classmate Kayla Rolland. To date, the boy is the youngest documented fatal school shooter.
May 26, 2000	Lake Worth, Florida	1	0	Lake Worth Middle School shooting: 13-year-old honor student Nathaniel Brazill was sent home for throwing water balloons but returned to his Lake Worth Middle School with a family pistol. He fatally shot teacher Barry Grunow, who was popular at the school.
January 13, 2006	Longwood, Florida	1	0	Killing of Christopher Penley: 15-year-old student Christopher Penley brandished a pellet gun resembling a firearm, leading to a police standoff; he was shot and killed by a deputy after pointing it at officers.
September 29, 2006	Cazenovia, Wisconsin	1	0	2006 Weston High School shooting: Eric Hainstock, a 15-year-old freshman, entered Weston High School and aimed a shotgun at a social studies teacher before it was wrestled from him by a school custodian. Hainstock then shot the high school principal, who died later that afternoon. Hainstock was convicted of murder and is serving a life sentence.
February 14, 2008	Oxnard, California	1	0	Murder of Larry King: 14-year-old Brandon McInerney, shot 15-year-old Lawrence "Larry" King, twice in the head in the computer laboratory of E.O. Green Junior High School. McInerney was apprehended in a nearby neighborhood. King, who was openly homosexual, died two days later. McInerney was initially charged with a hate crime, but that charge was dropped. McInerney pleaded guilty to second-degree murder and was sentenced to 21 years in prison.
June 24, 2009	Parkersburg, Iowa	1	0	Shooting of Edward Aruthur Thomas: Coach Edward Arthur Thomas, the football coach at Aplington–Parkersburg High School, was shot and killed in the school's weightroom by a former player.
June 2, 2018	Portland, Oregon	1	0	Murder of Daniel Brophy: Chef instructor Daniel Brophy was shot twice by his wife, romance novelist Nancy Crampton-Brophy, in a targeted killing motivated by financial gain; she was convicted of second-degree murder in 2022 and sentenced to life imprisonment.
February 22, 2022	Pueblo West, Colorado	1	0	Killing of Richard Ward: Richard Ward, a 32-year-old man, was fatally shot by a Pueblo County deputy outside Liberty Point International Middle School. The incident occurred in the school parking lot after deputies responded to a report of a man opening car doors. Ward was killed during a physical altercation with law enforcement. No students were injured.
August 28, 2023	Chapel Hill, North Carolina	1	0	Killing of Zijie Yan: A graduate student shot and killed Zijie Yan, a University of North Carolina at Chapel Hill faculty member.
September 10, 2025	Orem, Utah	1	0	Assassination of Charlie Kirk: Charlie Kirk, founder of Turning Point USA, was assassinated while speaking at an outdoor campus event at Utah Valley University. The suspected perpetrator, 22-year-old Tyler Robinson, fired a single round from a .30-06 Mauser M98 rifle from a rooftop of the Losee Center. Robinson was later arrested and charged with aggravated murder and related offenses; prosecutors announced their intent to seek the death penalty.

== See also ==
- Bath School disaster, a 1927 attack against an elementary school primarily perpetrated with explosives; it is the deadliest school-related massacre in United States history
- List of school shootings in Europe
- Gun violence in the United States
- Mass shootings in the United States
- List of mass shootings in the United States
- List of school-related attacks
- List of unsuccessful attacks related to schools
