= Tennessee school shooting =

Tennessee school shooting may refer to:

- Richland High School shooting, Lynnville, Tennessee, November 15, 1995
- Campbell County High School shooting, Jacksboro, Tennessee, November 8, 2005
- The Covenant School shooting, Nashville, Tennessee, March 27, 2023
