= Heather Smith =

Heather Smith may refer to:

- Heather Smith (curler) (born 1972), Canadian curler
- Heather Smith (public servant), Australian public servant
- Heather Forster Smith, Chief Justice of the Ontario Superior Court of Justice
- Heather Rene Smith (born 1987), American model
- Heather Smith (1971–1985), American school shooter
