= 2003 Rocori High School shooting =

School shooting in Cold Spring, Minnesota

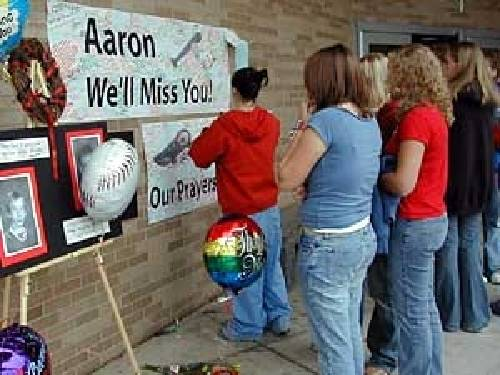
- Memorial for Rollins after the shooting
- Location: 45°27′52″N 94°25′42″W; Cold Spring, Minnesota, U.S.
- Date: September 24, 2003; 23 years ago (CDT; UTC−05:00)
- Attack type: School shooting
- Weapon: .22 caliber Colt Target Model semi-automatic pistol
- Deaths: 2
- Perpetrator: John Jason McLaughlin
- Defender: Mark Johnson
- Motive: Retaliation for alleged bullying
- Verdict: Guilty on both counts
- Convictions: Premeditated first-degree murder; Second-degree murder
- Sentence: Life imprisonment with the possibility of parole after 33 years, consecutive sentence of 12 years in prison
- Litigation: Wrongful death lawsuit against perpetrator's family and school district settled for $200,000

On September 24, 2003, a school shooting occurred at Rocori High School in Cold Spring, Minnesota, United States. The perpetrator, 15-year-old freshman John Jason McLaughlin, murdered 14-year-old freshman Seth Bartell and 17-year-old senior Aaron Rollins. McLaughlin was convicted of first-degree and second-degree murder charges and received a lengthy prison sentence.

== Shooting ==
=== Perpetrator ===
John Jason McLaughlin was born July 19, 1988. Prior to the shooting, McLaughlin was described as "quiet and withdrawn".

=== Incident ===
McLaughlin arrived at Rocori High School with a loaded Colt .22 caliber handgun with the intention of killing Bartell who, McLaughlin claimed, bullied him over his acne. McLaughlin met Bartell and Rollins as they were exiting the school locker room. He shot at Bartell, hitting him in the chest. McLaughlin fired a second shot at Bartell, which missed, ricocheted off a wall and hit Rollins in the neck, which quickly led to his death. Bartell attempted to flee the scene, but he was followed by McLaughlin, who fired another shot at Bartell, hitting him in the forehead. Gym coach Mark Johnson then confronted McLaughlin, who initially aimed the gun at Johnson, but then when Coach Johnson raised his hand and shouted at McLaughlin to 'stop', McLaughlin emptied the bullets from the gun and dropped it. Johnson secured the gun and took McLaughlin to the school office.

Bartell was taken to the St. Cloud Hospital, where he was treated for head injury and brain trauma. Bartell died 16 days later, on October 11, 2003.

== Legal proceedings ==
McLaughlin's photo when he was booked following the shooting.

=== Criminal trial and sentence ===
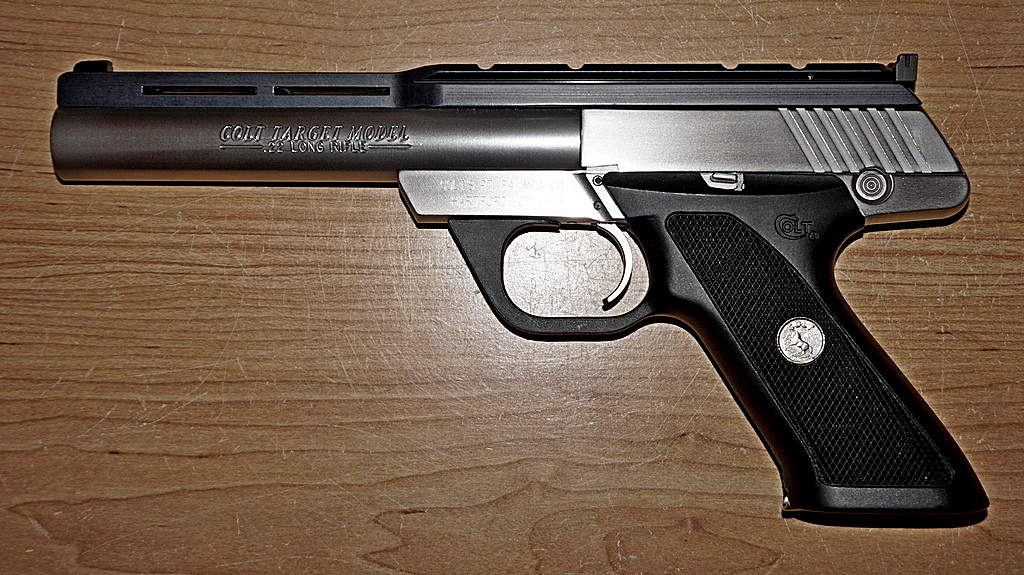
A .22 caliber Colt Target Model pistol similar to the one used by McLaughlin

The trial began on July 5, 2005. The defense argued that McLaughlin did not plan to kill anyone and that the teen had only intended to scare Bartell. The prosecution argued that the deaths were premeditated, as McLaughlin had stated to police that he had planned the shooting "several days in advance". Six mental health experts were brought in to testify in court. Three of the experts diagnosed McLaughlin with schizophrenia while the other three diagnosed him with major depression in remission and an "emerging personality disorder". McLaughlin was found guilty of first and second-degree murder.

In August 2005, he was sentenced with two consecutive prison sentences. McLaughlin was sentenced to life in prison for first-degree murder and 12 years in prison for second-degree murder. Prior to the sentences, McLaughlin's attorneys attempted to have him declared insane at the time of the shootings, which would have resulted with McLaughlin serving his sentence at a mental hospital rather than a correctional facility. The Judge ruled that McLaughlin was sane at the time of the killings based on McLaughlin's writings and videotaped confession, where he detailed his planning of the crime. McLaughlin was also ordered to pay restitution in the amount of $15,000 to the Minnesota Crime Victims Reparations Board.

Jason McLaughlin was incarcerated Minnesota Correctional Facility – Stillwater, and later at Minnesota Correctional Facility – Oak Park Heights. He will not be eligible for parole until 2038, when he will be 50-years-old.

=== Wrongful death lawsuit ===
In September 2006, the families of victims Aaron Rollins and Seth Bartell filed a wrongful death lawsuit against the McLaughlins, the Rocori school district, and former Rocori High School Principal Doug Standke. The families alleged that the school district had prior knowledge of the shootings about a week before their occurrence and that they could have prevented its occurrence. The lawsuit was initially dismissed, but later settled out of court for $200,000.

== Aftermath ==
Four children of Minnesota legislator Lisa Demuth were on campus the day of the shooting. The event became part of the discussion of gun control measures and Demuth's campaign for Minnesota governor in 2026.

== See also ==
- List of school shootings in the United States
- List of school shootings in the United States by death toll
- 2005 Red Lake shootings
- Annunciation Catholic Church shooting
