= Spanaway Junior High School shooting =

1985 school shooting in Spanaway, Washington, US

- Location of Spanaway, Washington
- Location: Spanaway, Washington, US
- Date: November 26, 1985 ≈4:30-6:30 p.m. PST (UTC-8)
- Target: Gordon Pickett
- Attack type: School shooting; murder-suicide
- Weapon: .22-caliber semi-automatic rifle
- Deaths: 3 (including the perpetrator)
- Perpetrator: Heather Smith
- Defender: Christopher Ricco
- Motive: Breakup, poor grades, depression, suicidal ideation

On November 26, 1985, a school shooting occurred in the schoolyard of Spanaway Junior High School in Spanaway, Washington, United States. Heather Smith, a 14-year-old freshman student, arrived outside the school gymnasium after school with a rifle and planned to kill her ex-boyfriend, 15-year-old Gordon Pickett. She aimed the rifle at Pickett when she first saw him. 14-year-old Christopher Ricco stepped in front of Pickett in an attempt to save him and tried to persuade Smith not to shoot the rifle. Smith fatally shot Ricco, then fatally shot Pickett and fled the scene. A manhunt to find and arrest Smith ensued.

After being missing for a few hours, Smith returned to the crime scene, where law enforcement was present. Smith fatally shot herself during a one-minute standoff with police. The shooting was unexpected for the school's community. School staff and law enforcement considered the homicides and suicide to be an isolated case. Smith was the youngest female school shooter in history.

== Background ==
=== Perpetrator ===
Heather Smith (February 5, 1971 – November 26, 1985) was born in Würzburg, West Germany. She was a straight-A student, worked as a teaching assistant, and was a member of several extracurricular activities in her school, including gymnastics, the school's honor society, and Natural Helpers, a group where students help other students with their problems.

=== Victims ===
Gordon Pickett (left) and Christopher Ricco (right)

Gordon Pickett was 15 years old at the time of the shooting, a straight-A student, and practiced extracurricular activities in wrestling, soccer, and Boy Scouts. Christopher Ricco was 14 years old at the time of the shooting, a close friend of Pickett, and active in skiing, fishing, wrestling, and running extracurricular activities. Ricco did many chores for his family and would help babysit his neighbor's children. Spanaway Junior High School had 740 students at the time of the shooting.

=== Smith's motive ===
Smith and Pickett had been dating on and off ever since they were in eighth grade. Pickett broke up with Smith more than six weeks before the shooting, as he just wanted to be friends. Pickett started dating a different girl, Smith found out, and Smith was angry. Smith also became depressed over recent imperfection in her otherwise nearly perfect 3.9 grade point average.

She attempted suicide a week before the shooting by slashing her wrists with a knife, but failed. Her parents were aware of the attempt. Smith's friends also prevented her from other suicide attempts that involved taking pills. Smith was sent to the guidance counselor's office at Madigan Army Medical Center, but the counseling was kept confidential from the Spanaway school staff. The suicide attempts are believed to have been motivated by her breakup and disappointing grades.

Some students knew that Smith was planning to bring a gun to the school and scare Gordon. Smith reportedly told half a dozen to a dozen classmates that she planned to "shoot Gordon" or "get even with Gordon" and "people would remember her". However, Smith would also tell them that she was only kidding. None of her classmates took her threats of violence seriously, as she had a reputation for being a practical joker, a good student, and a girl.

== Shootings ==
=== Preparation ===
On Tuesday afternoon, November 26, 1985, Pickett and Ricco were working out in the school gym after school. Both boys were members of the Spanaway Junior High School wrestling team. When Heather Smith came home from school, she loaded her father's .22-caliber semi-automatic rifle, wrapped it in a blanket, and asked a friend to give her a ride back to the school. Smith's friend was unaware of Smith's plans and intentions. A motorist, Carl Joe Begay, drove past the school and witnessed Smith with the rifle, but he did not report the weapon to anybody since he mistakenly thought it was a BB gun.

=== Homicides ===
Matt Hone, a 13-year-old eighth grader, saw Smith holding the rifle outside the gym around 4:30pm. Smith asked Hone to find Pickett and bring him to her. Hone asked "What are you going to do, blow his brains out?" Smith responded "No, I don't even know how to load this thing."

When Smith saw her ex-boyfriend, Gordon Pickett, and his friend, Christopher Ricco, exit the gym, Smith aimed her rifle at Pickett. Ricco stepped in front of Pickett in an attempt to save him and tried to persuade Smith not to shoot the rifle. Smith fatally wounded Ricco by three gunshots. Smith then fatally shot Pickett in the head and he died in the snowy schoolyard. Smith ran away and was missing for a few hours. Ricco died Tuesday night at the Madigan Army Medical Center intensive care unit.

=== Manhunt ===
Students and staff at the gymnasium identified Smith as the shooter to the police. Officers and police dogs checked several addresses suggested by witnesses as to where Smith might be hiding, but no one found her. Officers surrounded a house that was several blocks south of the school and yelled "Heather come out" over a megaphone. Someone named Heather came out of the house, but she was the wrong person, nor was the actual perpetrator at the house. A television news helicopter also searched for Smith over the neighborhoods surrounding the school.

=== Suicide ===
At 6:30pm, Smith returned to the school grounds, where law enforcement officers and students were present investigating the murders. Upon seeing Smith, the officers ordered everyone else to get inside the gymnasium for safety. The officers confronted Smith, told her "It'll be all right", and demanded her to drop the rifle. Smith replied "No, it won't." As the officers approached to disarm her within 25 yards, she aimed the rifle at her head and lowered it twice. When she pointed the rifle at her right temple the third time, she pulled the trigger. The standoff lasted less than a minute and took place several yards from where Smith shot her victims. Smith died at Madigan Army Medical Center the next morning.

== Aftermath ==
Pierce County sheriff's Deputy Rick Adamson interviewed 30 pupils after the shooting. 50 to 75 students were counseled by the school, including five or six students who were especially emotionally hurt. Many of the students experienced survivor's guilt. Thanksgiving Day occurred two days after the shooting, and classes resumed sometime within the first week of December. An estimated 450 students attended a memorial service for the deceased students on Tuesday, December 3. Ricco and Pickett's Boy Scout master nominated Ricco for the national Scouts' highest honor for lifesaving.

The parents of each of the deceased children displayed an "incredible outpouring of love" and forgiveness at Madigan Army Medical Center. Heather's family declined to talk to reporters. The school principal, vice principal, and Smith's friends remarked that the shootings were out of her character. School staff and law enforcement considered the homicides and suicide to be an isolated case.

As of 2012, Smith was the youngest female school shooter in history, according to American historian Laura L. Lovett.

== See also ==
- List of school shootings in the United States by death toll
- List of school shootings in the United States (before 2000)
- List of school-related attacks
