= 2002 University of Arizona shooting =

School shooting in Arizona, U.S.

Coordinates: 32.2390°N 110.9455°W

- Location: Tucson, Arizona, U.S.
- Date: October 28, 2002; 24 years ago c. 8:30 a.m. (MST)
- Attack type: School shooting, murder–suicide, mass murder
- Weapons: .45-caliber Norinco M1911 semi-automatic pistol; .40-caliber Glock semi-automatic pistol; 9mm CZ semi-automatic pistol; .357 Magnum Smith & Wesson revolver; .357 Magnum Colt revolver
- Deaths: 4 (including the perpetrator)
- Injuries: 0
- Perpetrators: Robert Stewart Flores, Jr.
- Motive: Unknown

On October 28 2002, a school shooting occurred at the University of Arizona nursing school, in Tucson Arizona, United states. 41-year-old Robert Flores arrived at approximately 8:30am, and opened fire. which resulted in the deaths of three nursing professors, before he killed himself.

== Shooting ==
The shooting began around 8:30 a.m. when Flores arrived at the university's nursing building with five handguns and more than 200 rounds of ammunition. Once there, he entered an office on the second floor and shot Robin Rogers, a clinical assistant professor, multiple times. Flores then proceeded to a classroom on the fourth floor where students were taking an exam in critical care. There, he shot both Barbara Monroe, a clinical assistant professor, and Cheryl McGaffic, a clinical associate professor. All victims were professors of the shooter.

== Perpetrator ==
Robert Stewart Flores Jr. was a 41-year-old Gulf War veteran and licensed practical nurse. Reportedly, he was studying to become a registered nurse. However, he had failed a pediatric nursing course and was failing his critical care course, taught by Barbara Monroe, at the time of the shooting. Flores was also a divorced father of two.

== Letter ==
Flores Jr. mailed a 22-page letter to Arizona Daily Star shortly before killing three people and himself at the University of Arizona. The newspaper staff decided to publish the letter on its website. In a note with the letter when it was posted online, editor Bobbie Jo Buel stated they "decided to run excerpts in these pages and the entire letter online — not to give voice to a killer who doesn't deserve it but with the hope that it helps our hurting community come to grips with his twisted act."

== See also ==
- List of school shootings in the United States by death toll
- List of school shootings in the United States (2000–present)
