= Shooting of Rylan Wilder =

2019 police shooting in llinois

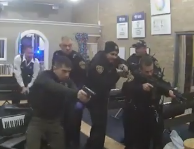
- Police officers point guns at Christopher Willis after killing him
- Location: UpBeat Music & Arts, Irving Park, Chicago, USA
- Date: November 19, 2019
- Weapon: Semi-automatic rifle
- Deaths: 1
- Injuries: 1
- Victim: Rylan Wilder
- Perpetrator: Des Plaines Police Department
- Litigation: Multiple lawsuits; both settled in 2023

On November 19, 2019, 15-year-old Rylan Wilder, intern of UpBeat Music & Arts music school, was accidentally shot by Des Plaines police officer James Armstrong who was shooting at a robbery suspect during a pursuit. The suspect was shot and killed while Wilder was sent to a hospital, where he underwent several surgeries.

Armstrong's bullets struck Wilder in the abdomen, not touching his vital organs; his arm was also hit causing significant injuries that damaged his nerves and left him with irreparable damage. The family of the teen sued one of the dead suspect's accomplices, who was arrested at the day of the incident, and officer Armstrong. They reached a settlement of $1.9 million with the city and $20 million with Armstrong in 2023.

== Shooting ==
On November 19, 2019, an armed robbery was allegedly committed in Des Plaines, Illinois by two men; 32-year old Maurice Murphy and Christopher Willis. Willis carjacked someone's car after the robbery and was spotted by police who began pursuing the car in Old Irving Park. The incident attracted a large amount of police attention due to the seriousness of the crime. Willis' accomplice, Murphy, was immediately arrested after the bank robbery, leaving Willis alone.

Reportedly, 20 police cars pursued Willis and he was armed with a firearm. The chase ended in Irving Park, Chicago after he crashed the car and fled the scene. Willis then proceeded to shoot at a police car and an officer before running in to a nearby building where UpBeat Music & Arts school was located.

CCTV footage showed him running into the school building before a police officer entered and fired a dozen rounds. It also showed one of the school's employees, 15-year old teen Rylan Wilder, who happened to walk past the gunfire, being struck and attempting to take cover by running into a different room. One of bullets fired by the police pierced Wilder's arm and stopped at his abdomen. The police officer, James Armstrong, who shot at the suspect used a semi-automatic rifle, leaving 12 shell casings at the scene. Willis was armed with a 9 mm handgun.

Willis was shot in the head and pronounced dead shortly after in Illinois Masonic Medical Center. Police said Willis had not fired his gun inside the school, all the shell casings found at the scene belonged to the officer who fired at Willis. It was later revealed that Willis and his accomplice stole $15,500 from the bank. According to a lawsuit filed by the teen's parents, Wilder was preparing to leave the school for the day after finishing his shift. Then, police sirens were heard followed by Willis entering the building, running past Wilder, armed with a gun. Police officers entered the school shortly after and killed Willis, accidentally shooting Wilder in the process. Wilder was rushed to an emergency room at Lurie Children's Hospital.

== Injuries ==
In August 2021, Rylan's mother was interviewed by Chicago Sun-Times, she said Rylan lost half of his blood as doctors were operating on him in the hospital. The rifle bullet made a small hole in his elbow, approximately an inch in diameter, it broke into multiple pieces and lodged into his abdomen, without touching any vital organs. The bullet pierced the arm, shattering bones and damaging muscles, artery and nerves causing Rylan to bleed profusely. Doctors later managed to connect his nerves and arteries to maintain his blood flow and healing process. They collected his shattered bone pieces and put it back together with temporary 10-inch-long titanium rod that would be replaced with steel plates. Doctor Vineeta Swaroop, who was Rylan's surgeon, said she never seen such injuries in her career and will never forget him. Doctor David Kalainov, who operated on his arm 2 times, said that Rylan will not fully recover because damaged nerves never fully regrow. He said his hobby of playing guiltar may help recover faster.

The family launched a GoFundMe account for Rylan in 2019 to cover the cost of his medical expenses, it amassed almost $54,000. The account received significant support from people. Ray Quinn, owner of the Monarchy Over Monday music show, donated all of the shows' income to the campaign. Several musicians in Chicago offered Rylan invitations to their events once he recovers. One day after the shooting, students of the Rylan's Lane Tech College High School received an announcement detailing the incident, they created posters for Rylan containing kind messages, their parents also donated to his GoFundMe.

Throughout his recovery, Rylan experienced 18 surgeries and daily 3-hour long physical therapy sessions that he attended for years. In 2023, Rylan reportedly still felt numbness in his left arm, specifically the hand and fingers. Despite that, he re-learned how to play guiltar, and at the beginning of 2024, he was accepted to Columbia College Chicago as a music technology student. His family said that they received no apologies from Des Plaines Police Department.

== Legal proceedings ==
In November 2019, family of Wilder, Tom Wilder and Lucia Morales, sued the accomplice of Willis for damages. His mother said the bullet ripped a chunk of his left arm and he may not regain the hand's full use ever again due to the bone being irreparably destroyed. Wilder's mother also stated that when he was hospitalized, he asked his family if his sister, who also attended UpBeat Music & Arts, was okay and if he would be able to play guitar again.

Timothy J. Cavanagh, a lawyer who was hired to represent the family, collected video footage of the incident to find out what happened, and requested Des Plaines police for audio communication logs and bodycam footage. The family's lawsuit blamed Maurice Murphy for the incident, stating: "Maurice Murphy knew or should have been aware that his actions... could lead to further acts of violence involving innocent bystanders". Cavanagh claimed that the officer who shot at Willis had his bodycam pointed down for unknown reasons and vowed to investigate why.

In August 2021, District Attorney Kim Foxx did not charge officer James Armstrong because his use of force was reasonable. She said that he feared for his life and he did not see Wilder during the shooting. Foxx said that Wilder could not be seen in Armstrong's bodycam footage, confirming his claim of not being able to see him. Des Plaines police chief David Anderson supported Foxx's decision. Timothy Cavanagh was outraged by her decision, calling the officer's actions "reckless". In October 2023, a $1.9 million settlement with the family was reached. City of Des Plaines added that them accepting the settlement does not mean they accept their liability for the shooting, it also called the actions of the officers involved "heroic". The settlement also included officer James Armstrong, who the family sued in 2019. He agreed to pay them $20 million. Despite this, Armstrong still works as a police officer. Wilder said that he accepts the settlement and plans to become a professional guitarist, Wilder's lawyer gifted him a special guitar signed by members of The Rolling Stones. Wilder played it in front of journalists.

== See also ==
- List of school shootings in the United States by death toll
