= 2003 Case Western Reserve University shooting =

School shooting in Cleveland, Ohio

- Location: 41.510°N 81.608°W; Cleveland, Ohio, United States
- Date: May 9, 2003
- Attack type: School shooting
- Weapons: 9mm Cobray MAC-11/9 semi-automatic pistol; 9mm Ruger semi-automatic pistol
- Deaths: 1
- Injuries: 2
- Perpetrator: Biswanath Halder
- Motive: Revenge

The Case Western Reserve University shooting took place on May 9, 2003, when Biswanath Halder entered the Peter B. Lewis Building of the Weatherhead School of Management in Cleveland, Ohio where he then killed graduate student Norman Wallace and wounded two professors. Halder took people in the building hostage, and they ran and barricaded themselves and hid during the seven hours that the gunman roamed the building, shooting indiscriminately. He was finally apprehended by a SWAT team. Halder was convicted on multiple felony counts and sentenced to life in prison. He lost a 2008 appeal.

== Shooting ==
Dressed in camouflage, 62-year-old Biswanath Halder, wearing a flak vest and carrying a semi-automatic pistol, entered the Peter B. Lewis Building of Case Western Reserve University on the afternoon of May 9, 2003. He started roaming the halls and shooting the pistol, quickly encountering Norman Wallace, a 30-year-old graduate student, whom he shot and killed. Hearing the shots, other people ran to get away from the gunman. As it was a Friday, the school had fewer students and staff around than at other times during the week, but nearly 100 people were trapped in the building. Police and authorities advised them by e-mail to hide and barricade their offices. Some hid in closets. The irregular design of the building by architect Frank Gehry provided the shooter with places of concealment, and he proceeded throughout the building, shooting at anyone he encountered. He exchanged frequent gunfire with law enforcement forces.

For more than seven hours, Halder held off Cleveland city police, SWAT officers, FBI and forces of the Cuyahoga County Sheriff's Department. He conducted sniper-like gun battles from positions in the building, but they gradually forced him upward in the building. As the police and other forces were able to clear each floor of the five-story building, they escorted people to safety. Halder was ultimately apprehended by a SWAT team in a closet of a fifth-floor classroom.

== Victims ==
- Norman Wallace, 30, first-year MBA student from Youngstown, Ohio, was killed.
- Wounded, Avi Dor, Professor of Health Care Economics
- Wounded, Susan Helper, Professor of Economics

== Perpetrator ==
Biswanath Halder (b. July 19, 1940) was a 62-year-old native of Calcutta, India. He immigrated to the United States, where he worked for many years. He attended the Weatherhead School of Management at Case Western Reserve University (CWRU), graduating in 1999 and gaining a reputation of being difficult. He filed a suit against Shawn Miller, administrator of the computer lab, accusing him of "destroying his computer files and website which he said was to help fellow Indians form businesses." Halder had been feuding with him for three years and filed a civil case against him, which was dismissed by the court in 2003. It appears Halder went to the business school seeking the man in revenge. He was armed and wearing a flak vest, helmet, and camouflage gear.

== Aftermath ==
Halder was charged with 338 felony counts, including aggravated murder and terrorism. His trial began in late 2005 and more than 100 witnesses were called. In court, he apologized for his actions. He was convicted on all counts. Though prosecutors had sought the death penalty for Halder, the jury instead sentenced him to life in prison without parole. An appeal in 2008 was denied.

In 2006, Dateline NBC aired a report, "Terror in the Afternoon," on the shooting incident. It featured video footage from the incident, interviews with family members of Halder and Wallace, and discussions about Halder's motive. The tenth anniversary of the incident was commemorated in various news media in 2013.

Halder was held at the Pickaway Correctional Institution in Pickaway, Ohio. He died at the Franklin Medical Center, a prison hospital in Columbus, on November 17, 2025.

== See also ==
- List of school shootings in the United States by death toll
