= Nathaniel Brazill =

American convicted murderer

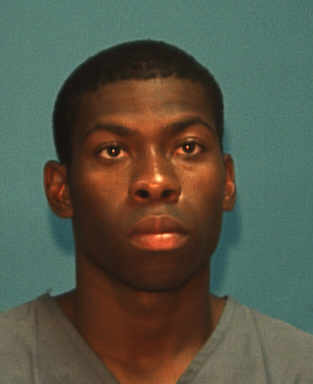
- Mugshot of Brazill
- Born: September 22, 1986 (age 40); Florida, U.S.
- Parent: Polly Powell
- Status: Incarcerated at Quincy Annex
- Convictions: Second degree murder, aggravated assault
- Penalty: 28 years imprisonment, plus 7 years felony probation

Details
- Victims: Barry Grunow (killed)
- Date: May 26, 2000
- Country: United States
- Location: Lake Worth, Florida
- Weapon: 25-cal. Raven handgun

Nathaniel R. Brazill (born September 22, 1986) is an American man who, at age 13, fatally shot one of his schoolteachers, Barry Grunow, at Lake Worth Middle School in Lake Worth, Florida. Brazill was subsequently convicted and sentenced to 28 years in prison.

== Shooting and conviction ==
On May 26, 2000, the last day of the 1999–2000 school year, Brazill—a seventh grade student—shot and killed Barry Grunow, an English teacher at Lake Worth Middle School in Lake Worth, Florida. After being sent home from school earlier that day for throwing a water balloon in the school cafeteria, Brazill had returned to his grandmothers home, retrieved a .25-caliber handgun from a dresser drawer, and shot Grunow once in the head after returning to school. Brazill was tried as an adult and convicted of second-degree murder for the killing of Grunow and aggravated assault for pointing the gun at another teacher. The jury decided not to convict Brazill of first-degree murder, which requires premeditation and carries a mandatory life sentence in Florida, however, juveniles convicted of first-degree murder in Florida are given a review by a judge after 25 years. Brazill was sentenced to 28 years in state prison followed by 7 years of probation.

== Subsequent civil litigation ==
Pam Grunow, the widow of the murdered teacher, sued the Brazill family friend that owned the handgun used, the Palm Beach County School Board, and the pawn shop that sold the handgun. These cases were settled for over $1 million. Grunow also filed an action against the gun manufacturer that resulted in a $1.2 million jury verdict, but the trial judge set aside the verdict, and in 2005 the Florida District Court of Appeals upheld this ruling.

== Imprisonment ==
Brazill is incarcerated at the Quincy Annex with a release date set for May 18, 2028. While imprisoned, Brazill earned his GED and certification as a paralegal.

== Childhood and student career ==
Brazill was born on September 22, 1986, in Detroit, Michigan, into a working class background. From birth, he had a distant relationship with his father, who paid child support. Brazill's mother is described as having been through multiple abusive relationships following his birth.

As a child, Brazill was surrounded by domestic abuse and alcoholism at home, and local police frequently responded to calls from the Brazill residence. Prior to the Grunow murder, Brazill received at least 2 D's as well as an F by Grunow himself; however, he was described by teachers as being mild mannered and likeable, and stated that Grunow was his favorite teacher. Shortly prior to the incident, Grunow had nominated Brazill for student of the month.

== See also ==
- List of school shootings in the United States by death toll
