= Susan Helper =

American economics professor and researcher

- Education: Oberlin College (BA); Harvard University (MA, phD)

Susan Helper is an American economist. She is the Frank Tracy Carlton Professor of Economics at the Weatherhead School of Management at Case Western Reserve University in Cleveland, Ohio.

== Education ==
Helper received a Bachelors of Arts in economics, Government, and Spanish from Oberlin College and a PhD in economics from Harvard University. Her doctoral dissertation at Harvard, written in 1987, was about the rise of the Japanese auto industry.

== Career ==
In 2012–13, Helper was a Senior Economist at the White House Council of Economic Advisers in the Obama administration. She then served as the Chief Economist of the U.S. Department of Commerce from 2013 to 2015. In 2021, Helper joined the Biden administration, first reprising her role as a Senior Economist at the White House Council of Economic Advisers for one year, and then serving as Senior Advisor for Industrial Strategy at the White House Office of Management and Budget for another year. In addition to her position as a professor of economics at Case Western Reserve University, Helper is, or has been, a research associate at the National Bureau of Economic Research, a Nonresident Senior Fellow at the Brookings Institution, a committee member of the National Academy of Sciences Panel on Manufacturing, a department editor for the Journal of Operations Management, and an editorial review board member for the Strategic Management Journal. She has been a visiting scholar at the University of Oxford, the University of California, and the Massachusetts Institute of Technology.

Most of Helper's research focuses on the United States manufacturing system and ways in which it can be strengthened and revitalized, including bringing back industries that have moved overseas (reshoring). While at the U.S. Department of Commerce, Helper encouraged corporations to consider all costs associated with producing goods overseas, rather than just the upfront costs, and analyzed ways to increase domestic innovation. In 2015, she contributed to the U.S. Department of Commerce report "Supply Chain Innovation: Strengthening America's Small Manufacturers", which analyzed the importance of reinvesting in America's supply chain, especially small manufacturers, and the barriers to innovation they currently face. More recently, her research has focused on the globalization of supply chains and the effects they have regionally, with emphasis in the automotive industry in the United States, Mexico, and China.

== Honors and accomplishments ==
In 2009, Helper received the Women of Achievement Award from the Flora Stone Mather Center for Women. Case Western Reserve University awards this honor biannually to women of the faculty, staff, and student body who have made a significant impact on their community with their "professional accomplishments, leadership, and service".

== Publications ==
Helper has contributed works to journals such as the American Economic Review, the Journal of Economics and Management Strategy, and the Journal of Law, Economics and Organization, among others. Her published works cover a diverse range of topics—from automotive supply chain innovation to international differences in productivity and employee attitudes.
