= 2008 University of Central Arkansas shooting =

School shooting in Conway, Arkansas

- Location: 35°04′44″N 92°27′34″W; University of Central Arkansas, Conway, Arkansas, U.S.
- Date: October 26, 2008 c. 9:00 pm (CDT)
- Attack type: School shooting, mass shooting
- Deaths: 2
- Injuries: 1
- Perpetrators: Kawin Brockman, Kelsey Perry, Mario Tony, and Brandon Wade

The University of Central Arkansas shooting was a school shooting that took place on the 12,500-student campus of the University of Central Arkansas in Conway, Arkansas on Sunday, October 26, 2008.

The shooting occurred after 9:00pm CDT outside of the Arkansas Hall dormitory. Two students – Ryan Henderson, 18, and Chavares Block, 19 – were fatally shot. A third person, 19-year-old Martrevis Norman, a non-student visiting the campus, was shot in the leg and was treated at the nearby Conway Regional Medical Center.

Four suspects were charged in the shooting: Kawin Brockman, 19, Kelsey Perry, 19, Mario Tony, 20, and Brandon Wade, 20. However, only Perry was convicted, and he pleaded guilty to two counts of first-degree murder and other charges and was sentenced to 40 years in prison.

This was the third time in 2008 that an Arkansas campus was the scene of a shooting. On January 23, Arkansas State University offensive line-man 20-year Alfred Louis was grazed in the lower left leg when someone fired several rounds from a 9mm handgun at a residence hall. He was treated at a local hospital. Charges were later dismissed against the person accused of firing the shots. On February 27, a student was shot and injured at the University of Arkansas at Little Rock. Two suspects were arrested and charged in that crime however it was later determined that the UALR shooting was not a prototypical "school shooting" as it involved non-students.

== See also ==
- List of school shootings in the United States by death toll
