= 2005 Campbell County High School shooting =

School shooting in Jacksboro, Tennessee

Coordinates: 36.3513°N 84.1481°W

- Location: Campbell County, Tennessee, U.S.
- Date: November 8, 2005; 2:11 p.m. (EST)
- Attack type: School shooting
- Weapon: .22 caliber handgun
- Deaths: 1
- Injuries: 2
- Perpetrators: Kenneth Bartley, Jr.

A school shooting occurred on November 8, 2005, at Campbell County Comprehensive High School near Jacksboro, Tennessee, United States, when a 14-year-old freshman student shot the school principal and two assistant principals. One assistant principal, Ken Bruce, died as a result of the shooting.

== Details ==
Earlier in the day, school principal Gary Seale received information that student Kenneth Bartley Jr. was armed with a handgun. The incident began when Seale confronted Bartley inside the administration office. Then Bartley brandished his .22 caliber pistol and reportedly said, "Yes, it's real. I'll show you. I never liked you anyway," and shot Seale. He later shot assistant principals Ken Bruce and Jim Pierce. Bartley was soon disarmed by another teacher inside the office. Seale and Pierce were transported by helicopter to the University of Tennessee Medical Center, while Bruce was treated at St. Mary's Hospital in LaFollette. Bruce was later pronounced dead from his wounds, while both Seale and Pierce were seriously wounded. When questioned, Bartley said that the gun belonged to his father, and he had stolen it to take to school with the intention of trading it for OxyContin.

== Aftermath ==
After the shooting, all students were evacuated from class and Campbell County police used Alsatian police dogs to search the premises of Campbell County High School. The school was closed for the rest of the week and was reopened the following Monday.

=== Legal proceedings ===
Bartley was charged with first-degree murder and scheduled to be tried as an adult. On April 10, 2007, when jury selection was about to begin for his trial, he accepted a plea bargain and entered a plea of guilty to second-degree murder and two counts of attempted second-degree murder. He was then sentenced to 25 years in prison for the murder, to be followed by two consecutive 10-year sentences for the attempted murders, for a total of 45 years in prison, with his earliest parole eligibility after 29 years. The first several years of his sentence were to be served in juvenile prison; at age 18 he would be transferred to adult prison.

One month after pleading guilty, Bartley attempted to withdraw his plea, but his request was denied. He later dismissed the attorney who had represented him and hired a new attorney. In 2009, the Tennessee Court of Criminal Appeals denied an appeal by Bartley. In October 2010, his attorney filed a petition for post-conviction relief, stating that Bartley accepted the plea bargain without having a "meaningful opportunity" to discuss it with his parents. A court hearing held in June 2011 included testimony indicating that Bartley's original attorney had whispered the terms of the proposed plea bargain to Bartley while the frightened defendant was watching prospective jurors file into the courtroom, that the attorney had not advised Bartley on the merits of the proposal, and that Bartley considered the proposal for only three seconds before accepting it, without discussing it with his parents or the therapist who had been involved with his earlier plea negotiations. After hearing this testimony, Judge Kerry Blackwood, who had presided over the original trial, vacated Bartley's guilty plea and ordered a new trial, reversing his own earlier denial of a request for a new trial. The Tennessee Attorney General’s office appealed that decision, and in March 2013 the Tennessee Court of Criminal Appeals issued a decision affirming Blackwood's order of a new trial.

Bartley was tried in February 2014. To avoid prejudicial effects from the extensive attention the case had received in the Campbell County area, the jury was drawn from Hamilton County, Tennessee, and sequestered during the trial. On February 28, 2014, Bartley was found guilty of reckless homicide for Bruce's death and not guilty on charges of attempted first-degree murder for the shootings of Seale and Pierce and was sentenced to time served.

==== Bartley's later legal problems ====
Bartley was arrested on June 21, 2014, when his father called police and said his son threatened to kill him over a set of vehicle keys and was intoxicated. Bartley was released from jail on June 23, 2014, on charges of domestic assault, felony escape and resisting arrest on a 2,000 dollar unsecured bond and an agreement to continue to live with his father and refrain from alcohol and drugs. On July 10, 2014, Bartley was confirmed to be back in custody after trying to hit two deputies when they were investigating a probation violation. He struck a plea deal and received probation. In 2015, Bartley was allowed to live with his counselor at her home in Vienna, Va., in lieu of a jail sentence for violating his probation. The counselor, Erin Tepaske, promised to get him mental health and substance abuse treatment, In May, Tepaske's 3-year-old son Beckett Josef Podominick died, allegedly from falling and hitting his head while under Bartley's care, and while Bartley was not considered a suspect in the child's death, he was wanted in Tennessee for a probation violation. In February 2018, Bartley was arrested after failing to appear in court for trespassing charges. He pleaded guilty to the misdemeanor charge and was again granted probation. However, in August of that year Bartley was arrested for assaulting a woman for which a jury found him not guilty. Bartley was later accused of brandishing a rubber mallet in an argument with his father's girlfriend, Kimberly Houston. He was found not guilty of that aggravated assault charge on January 29, 2019. Bartley is now being accused of vandalism, assaulting a police officer and resisting arrest.

== See also ==
- List of school shootings in the United States
- List of school shootings in the United States by death toll
