= Edward Arthur Thomas =

American football coach

- Born: July 17, 1950; Oskaloosa, Iowa, U.S.
- Died: June 24, 2009 (aged 58); Parkersburg, Iowa, U.S.
- Cause of death: Gunshot wounds
- Occupation: High school football coach

Edward Arthur Thomas (July 17, 1950 – June 24, 2009) was an American high school football coach. On June 24, 2009, Thomas was shot and killed in his Parkersburg, Iowa football team's weight room by Mark Becker, one of Thomas's former players. Thomas was airlifted to a Waterloo, Iowa hospital where he was pronounced dead shortly after arrival.

== Early life ==
Ed Thomas was born to Authrine and Roy Thomas on July 17, 1950. He was born in Oskaloosa, Iowa and raised in What Cheer, Iowa. He played football; his position was quarterback. Thomas was the oldest of 5, having 3 younger sisters and one younger brother. He graduated from Tri-County High School in Thornburg, Iowa in 1968 and obtained degrees from William Penn College and the University of Northern Iowa.

== Career ==
Thomas coached for 37 years in the "IHSAA" (Iowa High School Athletic Association) football program; winning two state titles and a total of 292 games. He is credited with having coached four NFL players, which include Aaron Kampman, Brad Meester, Jared DeVries, and Casey Wiegmann. In 2005, Thomas won the prestigious NFL High School Coach of the Year award.

== Death ==
Thomas was murdered on June 24, 2009, by Mark Becker, a mentally ill former player who had been released from a Waterloo Hospital less than a day prior to the shooting. Thomas was in a room with 20 football and volleyball players, many of whom testified at Becker's trial. He was shot six or seven times; Thomas also suffered blunt force injuries to his head, chest and legs, which were likely from Becker stomping or kicking Thomas, according to the medical examiner.

== Aftermath ==
The night of his death, 2,500 mourners gathered for a candlelight vigil. He was featured on the July 6, 2009 cover of Sports Illustrated. On August 28, 2009, the national cable network, ESPN, televised his high school's first football game of the year in memory of Coach Thomas.

On March 2, 2010, a Butler County jury convicted Becker of first-degree murder in connection with Thomas' death. Testimony in the trial focused on Becker's mental state at the time of the shooting. On April 14, 2010, Becker received a life sentence for his conviction of first-degree murder.

Members of Thomas' family have approached the Iowa Legislature to consider legislation requiring hospital personnel to notify law enforcement before releasing a psychiatric patient facing criminal charges. On March 24, 2010, the Ed Thomas Bill was passed.

Thomas was posthumously awarded the Arthur Ashe Courage Award at the 2010 ESPY Awards. On August 16, 2011, Zondervan released The Sacred Acre: The Ed Thomas Story, a book authored by the Thomas family and Mark Tabb; that tells the story of Thomas' role in the town's recovery after the 2008 tornado, and the details of his murder.

== See also ==
- List of school shootings in the United States by death toll
