= 2007 Delaware State University shooting =

2007 school shooting in Dover, Delaware

Coordinates: 39.1852°N 75.5420°W

- Location: Dover, Delaware, U.S.
- Date: September 21, 2007 (UTC-4)
- Attack type: School shooting, child murder
- Deaths: Shalita Middleton (died on October 23, 2007)
- Injuries: Nathaniel Pugh
- Perpetrator: Unknown
- Accused: Loyer D. Braden
- Charges: Second-degree murder; First-degree assault; First-degree reckless endangering; Possession of a firearm during the commission of a felony (3 counts); (All charges dismissed)

On September 21, 2007, two 17-year-old Delaware State University freshmen were shot on campus. One died 32 days later on October 23, from critical injuries sustained in the attack. A freshman student from East Orange, New Jersey, Loyer D. Braden, was arrested and charged with murder. However, the charges were dismissed in May 2009 due to a lack of evidence, as well as eyewitnesses saying that Braden was not the shooter.

== Events and university response ==
On September 21, 2007, a perpetrator shot two 17-year-old Delaware State University students from the Washington, D.C. area, Shalita Middleton and Nathaniel Pugh, and shot at but did not wound a third student. Middleton died on October 23 from injuries sustained in the attack, without regaining consciousness.

The university responded within 20 minutes of the shooting to notify students by web announcements, physically entering dorms, and telecommunications. Text messages were not sent at the time of the incident. The campus was kept on "limited access status" from Friday, September 21 through Sunday, September 23, with classes resuming on Monday, September 24. The university increased security patrols on campus following the incident.

== Arrest ==
On September 24, 2007, police arrested Loyer D. Braden, also a freshman, in his dorm and charged him with attempted first-degree murder among other offences. University spokesman Carlos Holmes stated, "I question the young man's intelligence in coming back to campus this morning, if that's what he did. Lord knows what was going through his brain. Maybe he thought he was scott-free."

On September 28, 2007, following Braden's arraignment hearing, the case was transferred to Superior Court for trial. The judge ordered that if Braden made bail, he be barred from visiting the DESU campus or contacting potential witnesses. After the victim died, a grand jury indicted Braden with his attempted first-degree murder charge being upgraded to second-degree murder.

=== Dismissal of charges ===
On May 19, 2009, the judge dismissed the charges against Braden, saying that the prosecution had withheld crucial evidence. A witness who had been with Middleton said that two men in dreadlocks and white t-shirts had shot the students. As of 2024, no further arrests have been made since the dismissal of Braden's charges.

== See also ==
- List of school shootings in the United States by death toll
