= 2000 University of Arkansas shooting =

School shooting in Fayetteville, Arkansas

University of Arkansas shooting
- Location: 36°3′43″N 94°9′28″W; Fayetteville, AR, U.S.
- Date: August 28, 2000 (UTC−05:00)
- Target: Faculty advisor
- Attack type: School shooting, murder–suicide
- Weapon: .38-caliber revolver
- Deaths: 2 (Locke and the perpetrator)
- Injuries: 0
- Perpetrator: James Easton Kelly
- Motive: Personal vendetta

On Monday, August 28, 2000, James Easton Kelly, 37, a disgruntled graduate student at the University of Arkansas, shot and killed his faculty advisor, Prof. John R. Locke, and then committed suicide shortly afterwards. The murder-suicide was the first incident of its type in the university's history.

== Shooting ==
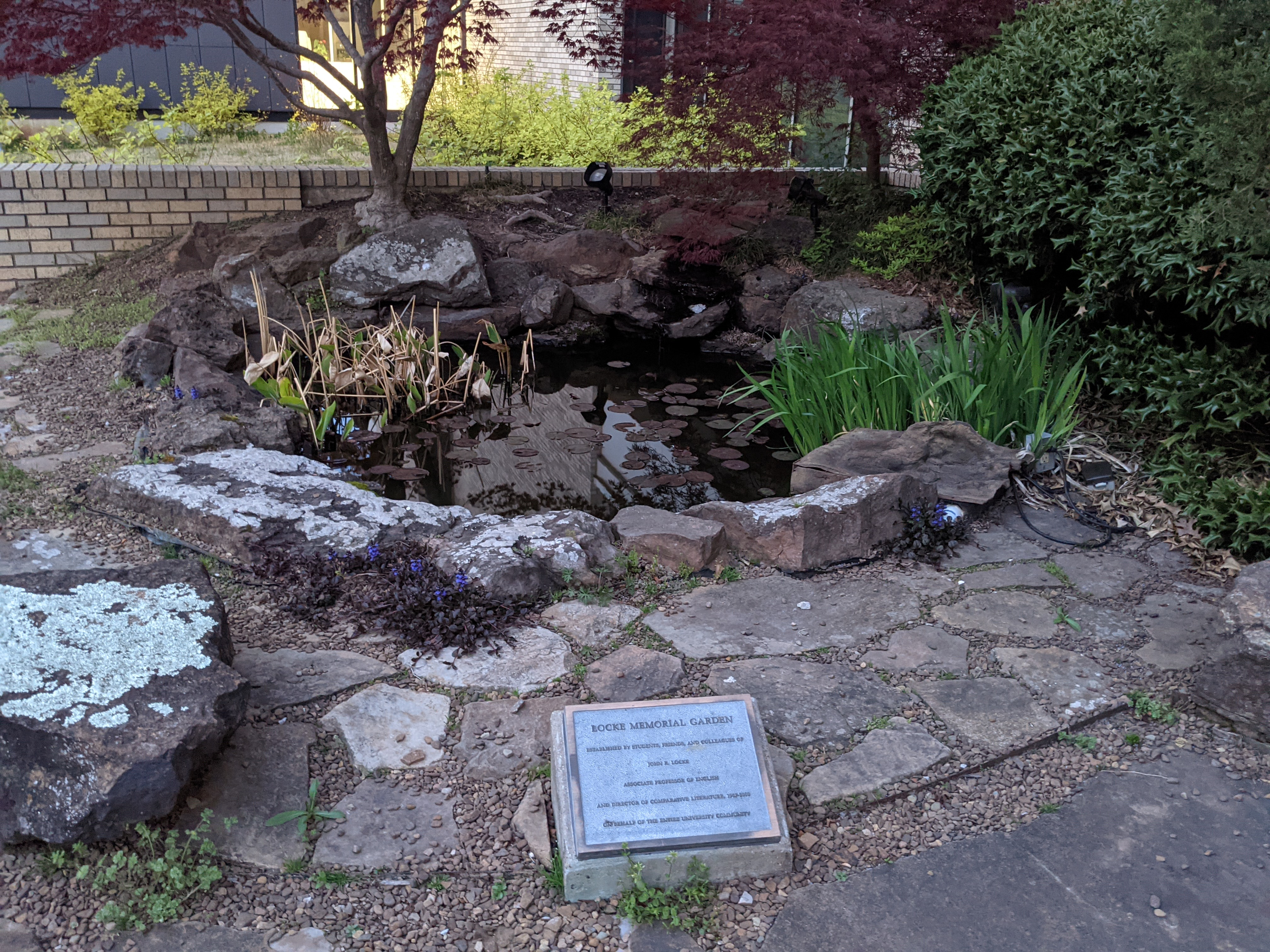
Memorial garden for Dr. John Locke on the University of Arkansas campus, near Kimpel Hall where he taught

The murder-suicide occurred on the first day of the Fall 2000 semester shortly after noon when James Easton Kelly, 37, a recently dismissed PhD candidate in the university's Comparative Literature program entered the office of Dr. John R. Locke, 67, the director of the Comparative Literature program and Kelly's former academic advisor. After the first shot rang out, graduate student Bethany Edstrom said she heard someone say: "I didn't do anything."

At approximately 12:14 pm a 911 call was received by the Fayetteville Police Department. The caller alerted the police to an incident involving gunshots in Kimpel Hall. It was later discovered that Kelly had shot Dr. Locke three times with a .38-caliber revolver using bullets he had purchased earlier. Graduate students and faculty in adjoining offices quickly alerted campus police whose officers reached Locke's office and secured the area within a few minutes. UAPD secured the area around Room 231 Kimpel Hall and began the evacuation of the building immediately.

Officers responding to at least three 911 calls found Locke's office door closed and locked. The responding officers said a man behind Locke's office door stated that he had been hurt, but that they should not enter. They conversed for a few minutes with the individual before another gunshot was heard after which no further contact was made with anyone in the office. A SWAT team was then activated and approximately an hour after the first officers arrived, police entered the office and found the bodies of Locke and Kelly with a handgun on the floor between them.

== Investigation ==
Subsequent investigation of the murder-suicide determined that Kelly was disgruntled due to his recent dismissal from the PhD program in Comparative Literature for which he blamed Locke (who had actually abstained from voting for Kelly's dismissal during a graduate committee review of his progress). A satchel containing letters from the committee and his dismissal notification were found with Kelly's body. A receipt for a 50-round box of ammunition was discovered the following Wednesday in Kelly's rental car. The receipt was stamped 11:27 a.m. by a Wal-Mart 10 miles from the Fayetteville campus, roughly 40 minutes before the shooting of Locke. Moments after the initial shooting, officers heard Kelly kill himself with the final of four shots. Two bullets remained in the revolver when officers finally entered the cluttered office, university police Chief Larry Slamons said.

=== Coroners and crime lab report ===
The crime lab report stated that the cause of death to Dr. Locke was homicide and the cause of death to Mr. Kelly was suicide. Chief Slamons said that a shot through Locke's hand indicated he raised his arm in a futile attempt to defend himself. Slamons also said that Locke and Kelly may have struggled, with Locke perhaps landing a blow before being fatally wounded.

== Victim ==
John R. Locke, son of a Danish immigrant and a New York City native, had been teaching Comparative Literature, Mythology, and Eastern philosophy at the university since 1967. In 1979, he published a translation of nine of Rainer Maria Rilke's dramas and was working on a collection of Rilke's poems and letters at the time of his death. He also circulated among friends and colleagues a private unpublished manuscript of meditation guides called The Troika Technique—based on his readings and study of Buddhist and Taoist philosophy and Jungian psychology. He was regarded by colleagues, friends, and students as a wise and deeply spiritual man whose loss deeply impacted the campus community. Locke planned to retire at the end of the 2000–2001 academic year, which had just started on the day of his murder.

== Perpetrator ==
Kelly, an African-American Arkansas native, was the son of a minister and considered a career in the ministry himself before choosing to attend Grinnell College where he earned a BA in English in 1984. He subsequently earned an MA in English from Arkansas State University in 1990. He then enrolled in the PhD program in English at the University of Arkansas, Fayetteville planning to study African-American literature and the literature of the African diaspora. At first, he seemed a promising student, but eventually ran into academic difficulties and in 1996 twice failed his oral examination required for his English PhD. He subsequently accused departmental faculty of racist attitudes when they did not find his research subjects acceptable. However, Dr. Locke, despite warnings from colleagues that Kelly was aloof and unsociable, admitted him into the Comparative Literature PhD program because he thought that it might be more suitable to Kelly's academic interests. However, Kelly began enrolling in courses, but failing to attend them, and eventually Locke grew disappointed with the student's increasingly unpredictable behavior.

== Reaction and followup ==
The evening of the tragedy, approximately 500 people poured into the Unitarian Universalist Fellowship of Fayetteville on campus for an unofficial prayer vigil organized by English PhD student (one of Locke's advisees), and her partner. An impromptu shrine was also created outside Locke's office and the university two weeks later held the "official" memorial service on September 12, 2000. A year later, on August 27, 2001, Locke's colleagues and friends began collections to create a memorial garden outside Kimpel Hall in his honor. The memorial garden was completed and dedicated in September 2003.

In 2006, Dr. Virginia Krauft, a Jungian psychologist and friend, opened the John Locke Memorial Library. The library houses Locke's large collection of books on German, American, British, French, Russian, Irish, Italian, Asian, Japanese and Scandinavian literature and literary criticism along with studies in the sciences, visual arts and anthropology and several books on Eastern philosophy and religion. The library is located at 1601 South Rainbow Road in Rogers, Arkansas.

== See also ==
- List of school shootings in the United States by death toll
