= Hueneme School District =

School district in Ventura County, California

Address
- 205 North Ventura Road Port Hueneme, California, 93041; United States

District information
- Type: Public
- Grades: K–8
- NCES District ID: 0617850

Students and staff
- Students: 7,544 (2020–2021)
- Teachers: 337.6 (FTE)
- Staff: 400.66 (FTE)
- Student–teacher ratio: 22.35:1

Other information
- Website: www.hueneme.org

The Hueneme School District (/waɪˈniːmiː/ wy-NEE-mee) is a school district headquartered in Port Hueneme, California, United States. The district serves elementary and junior high school students (grades K–8) in portions of the cities of Port Hueneme and Oxnard as well as adjacent unincorporated areas of Ventura County.

The district feeds into the Oxnard Union High School District, specifically Channel Islands and Hueneme high schools.

== History ==
E.O Green Junior High School, their first school, opened in 1960.

=== E.O. Green Junior High School murder ===
In 2008, 15-year old E.O Green Junior High School student Larry King was murdered in school by a fellow student, 14-year old Brandon Mclnerney, with a revolver in reaction to incidents where King publicly made advances towards Mclnerney.

Newsweek described the shooting as "the most prominent gay-bias crime since the 1998 murder of Matthew Shepard", bringing attention to issues of gun violence as well as gender expression and sexual identity of teenagers.

== Schools ==
=== Junior high schools ===
(6-8)

- Charles Blackstock Junior High School (Oxnard)
- E.O. Green Junior High School (opened 1960) (Oxnard)

=== Elementary schools ===
(K-6)

- Richard Bard Elementary School (Port Hueneme)
- Julien Hathaway Elementary School (Oxnard)
- Hollywood Beach Elementary School (Channel Islands Beach)
- Hueneme Elementary School (Port Hueneme)

(K-5)

- Art Haycox Elementary School (Oxnard)
- Ansgar Larsen Elementary School (Oxnard)
- Parkview Elementary School (Port Hueneme)
- Sunkist Elementary School (Port Hueneme)
- Fred L. Williams Elementary School (Oxnard)
