= Killing of Christopher Penley =

2006 police shooting of a child in Longwood, Florida

Christopher Penley, a 15-year-old boy, was killed on January 13, 2006, at Milwee Middle School in Longwood, Florida. During class, Penley took out an Airsoft gun that was designed to look realistic. Penley ran from the room and eventually entered a restroom area. SWAT officers arrived on the scene and tried to negotiate with him. Penley pointed the Airsoft gun at an officer, who responded by shooting Penley.

== Shooting ==
Penley had briefly taken classmate Maurice Cotey hostage in a classroom and then later barricaded himself in an outdoor bathroom at Milwee Middle School in Longwood, Florida, with an Airsoft gun painted entirely black to disguise it as a Beretta 92. After the weapon was discovered by Cotey, Penley forced him into the closet and shut off the lights in the classroom. The student immediately fled and informed security and later phoned police. SWAT arrived on the scene shortly thereafter, while a negotiator attempted to initiate contact with Penley. After a twenty-minute stand-off he aimed the pistol at Lieutenant Michael Weippert who responded by shooting him.

He was transported to Orlando Regional Medical Center where he remained on life support for two days before dying of his wounds. Several of his organs were removed and used as transplants. Seminole County Sheriff Don Eslinger said the boy was suicidal and would not respond to negotiators who tried to talk him down in the bathroom.

Some students at the school told the media after the incident that they knew he had "something planned". Police have been criticized for initiating action instead of waiting for Penley's father to arrive so that his father might convince him to surrender. The Orlando Sentinel reported that Ralph Penley was not told of events until after his son was shot. The Florida Department of Law Enforcement investigated the shooting and found it entirely justified, as Penley aimed an apparent weapon at the deputy.

== Aftermath ==
Penley's organs were donated by his family. His death gave nine people vital organs. Christopher Penley has also had a game room at the Landmark Church dedicated to him and a Youth center. The youth center the Adolescent Life Coaching Center opened in honor of Christopher Penley's memory and to give a place for the voice of youth to be heard.

Penley's family filed a lawsuit against police; however, a judge dismissed the suit after determining that the shooting was justified.

== See also ==
- Suicide by cop
- List of school-related attacks
