= Spanaway Junior High School =

Public school in Spanaway, Washington, US

Spanaway Junior High School is a public school in Spanaway, Washington, United States. Its enrollment was 768 as of June 2019. The school now occupies a building built in 2007.

== 1985 shooting ==
On November 26, 1985, a school shooting occurred in the schoolyard of Spanaway Junior High School in Spanaway, Washington, United States. Heather Smith, a 14-year-old freshman student, arrived outside the school gymnasium after school with a rifle and planned to kill her ex-boyfriend, 15-year-old Gordon Pickett. She aimed the rifle at Pickett when she first saw him. 14-year-old Christopher Ricco stepped in front of Pickett in an attempt to save him and tried to persuade Smith not to shoot the rifle. Smith fatally shot Ricco, then fatally shot Pickett and fled the scene. A manhunt to find and arrest Smith ensued.

After being missing for a few hours, Smith returned to the crime scene, where law enforcement was present. Smith fatally shot herself during a one-minute standoff with police. The shooting was unexpected for the school's community. School staff and law enforcement considered the homicides and suicide to be an isolated case. Smith was the youngest female school shooter in history.
