= Rauna Paadar-Leivo =

Saami writer from Finland

Rauna Paadar-Leivo (born 1942) is a Finnish Inari Sámi author who writes children's books, plays and novels in Northern Sámi. She currently lives in Inari and works at the Sami Parliament in Finland. Her books have been translated into Finnish, Norwegian, Russian and Inari Sámi. In 2000, the municipality of Inari awarded her its cultural prize.

== Bibliography ==
- Mo giđđa boahtá Sápmái (1988, illustrated by Merja Aletta Ranttila)
- Luobbalvári stallu (1989, illustrated by Merja Aletta Ranttila)
- Hálssatanjeakki noaidi (1990, illustrated by Merja Aletta Ranttila, translated by Matti Morottaja into Inari Sámi as Halstemjeegi noaidi in 1990. Also translated into Finnish the same year under the name Halstamojängän noita)
- Skábmanieida (1992, illustrated by Merja Aletta Ranttila)
- Goalsenjárga (1994, translated into Finnish in 1997 as Vieras talvi)
- Jokŋanieiddaš (1996, illustrated by Merja Aletta Ranttila)
- Vuoi dan Karenina (2000, illustrated by Lee Rodgers)

== Awards ==
- The Cultural Prize of the Municipality of Inari, 2000
