= List of attacks related to secondary schools (before 2000) =

This is a list of attacks related to secondary schools before 2000 that have occurred around the world. These are attacks that have occurred on school property or related primarily to school issues or events.

A narrow definition of the word attacks is used for this list so as to exclude:

1. Incidents that occurred as a result of warfare, robberies, gang violence, public attacks (as in political protests)
2. Accidental shootings
3. Murder–suicides by rejected suitors or estranged spouses
4. Suicides or suicide attempts involving only one person.
5. Incidents involving only school staff, belongs at List of workplace killings
6. Events where no injuries take place
7. A foiled attack, belongs at List of unsuccessful attacks related to schools
8. Attacks that took place at colleges, belongs at List of attacks related to post-secondary schools

The listed attacks include shootings, stabbings, slashings, bombings, and beatings administered with blunt instruments.

== Secondary school incidents ==
=== 1850s ===
Date	Location	Attacker(s)	Dead (Note: Including death or injury of attacker(s), when applicable.)	Injured	Description
November 2, 1853	Louisville, Kentucky, United States	Matthew Ward	1 dead		A student, Matthew Ward, went to school and shot and killed Schoolmaster Mr. Butler for excessively punishing his brother the day before. He was acquitted.
July 6, 1858	Baltimore, Maryland, United States		1 dead		The 15-year-old son of Col. John T. Farlow (Baltimore's Marshal of Police 1867–70), was shot to death during a Sabbath School gathering. The shooter escaped, but several arrests were made.

=== 1860s ===
Date	Location	Attacker(s)	Dead	Injured	Description
January 21, 1860	Todd County, Kentucky, United States		1 dead		A son of Giuseppe Elia was shot dead by another student, who had been led to believe that Sebree intended to kill him.
April 2, 1867	Madison, Florida, United States	Frank Pope	1 dead		Frank Pope, a pupil at the St. John's seminary, shot and killed his teacher Mr. Bristow with a pistol. Bristow had slapped Pope, who left and returned with a pistol and said that the teacher should get on his knees and beg his pardon or be shot. He refused and Pope shot him five times.

=== 1870s ===
Date	Location	Attacker(s)	Dead	Injured	Description
February 1, 1872	Washington, Pennsylvania, United States	Thomas McGiffen	1 dead		At the all-girls Union School, Thomas McGiffen, the 17-year-old son of Col. Norton McGiffin and brother of naval hero Philo McGiffin, shot and seriously wounded the principal, Prof. Wilson, because the professor refused to deliver a note to a young lady for him.
February 20, 1874	Agency, Montana, United States	Thomas Squires, 20	1 dead		After being ejected from school for disobedience, Thomas Squires, 20 years old, returned to the school yard a day or two later, and fatally shot Prof. Hayes three times.
May 5, 1874	Yekaterinburg, Russia	Alexei Skachkov	1 dead		A student of Yekaterinburg gymnasium was noticed smoking in the toilet by his head teacher Yakov Predtechensky, then after a decision to expel Skachkov he murdered Predtechensky using a revolver.
May 24, 1879	Lancaster, New York, United States	Frank Shugart		1 injured	Frank Shugart, a telegraph operator, shot and severely injured Mr. Carr, superintendent of the stables at a girls' school.

=== 1880s ===
Date	Location	Attacker(s)	Dead	Injured	Description
January 21, 1882	Red Bud, Illinois, United States	James E. McBride, 17	1 dead		After striking student James McBride in the face, teacher Robert Bailey was fatally wounded in a scuffle, in which the student stabbed him twice with a knife he was using to sharpen a pencil.
April 13, 1882	Huntsville, Texas, United States	G. W. Gray	1 dead		G. W. Gray, a student at the Sam Houston Normal School, shot and wounded another student, M. J. Jordan. They were arguing over a comic valentine.
August 27, 1886	Charleston, West Virginia, United States	John Griffith, 15		1 injured	After being reprimanded by his teacher, James Kiser, 15-year-old John Griffith, a student at a school in Jackson County, brought a knife and rocks to school the next morning. A struggle ensued in which student Griffith stabbed Kiser several times.
June 29, 1888	Dalby, Queensland, Australia	Peterson	1 dead		A 12-year-old student named Peterson stabbed his teacher when he was chastised for chasing another boy with a knife.

=== 1890s ===
Date	Location	Attacker(s)	Dead	Injured	Description
March 26, 1893	Plain Dealing, Louisiana, United States		4 dead	1 injured	During an evening school dance at Plain Dealing High School, a fight broke out. Two youths were shot dead, two more were fatally wounded, and the high school's Professor Johnson was shot in the arm.
January 26, 1899	Albany, Missouri, United States	Charles Ayres	1 dead		When he got whipped by his teacher T. B. Hunter, 13-year-old student Charles Ayres drew a jackknife and slashed the teacher's throat.

=== 1900s ===
Date	Location	Attacker(s)	Dead	Injured	Description
September 15, 1900	Kharkiv, Russian Empire	Iwanow	1 dead	1 injured	After failing an exam, gymnasium student Iwanow shot and killed principal Tschanowitsch with a revolver and also wounded a teacher named Horkiwicz, before surrendering to police.
April 28, 1902	Kingston, Ontario, Canada	Eric Sharp, 15	1 dead		Beatrice Holland, a 14-year-old student, is shot and killed by a fellow student at the Frontenac School. The shooter, 15-year-old Eric Sharp, fled the scene but later turned himself in to the police.
February 24, 1903	Inman, South Carolina, United States	Reuben Pitts	1 dead		Edward Foster, a 17-year-old student at Inman High school, was shot and fatally wounded by his teacher Reuben Pitts after he tried to resist punishment. Pitts said the student struck the pistol he drew in self-defense, and it fired. Pitts was acquitted of murder.
July 21, 1903	Jackson, Kentucky, United States		2 dead	1 injured	At the Cave Run School, James Barrett and Mack Howard fought a duel with pistols over a card game, killing each other. Another student James Vires, aged 12, suffered a wound while sitting at his desk.
April 6, 1904	Chicago, Illinois, United States	Henry Schaze	1 dead		Two students had been fighting over a girl for the better part of a year. Finally Henry Schaze pushed 16-year-old Paul Jelick to the ground and shot him dead.
November 16, 1904	Riverside, California, United States		2 dead	1 injured	At the Indian School, a gun fight broke out between pupils. Charles Colby was shot in the head, then returned fire, killing Tom Bucanoros and fatally wounding Fred Smith.
December 16, 1904	Magee, Mississippi, United States	E. E. Mangum	1 dead	1 injured	E. E. Mangum was shot through the head and killed by the principal of the high school, Professor J. E. Woodward after the student argued about punishment of his son and the argument became violent.
February 9, 1905	Colusa, California, United States	William Ingrim		2 injured	At the request of his childhood friend, Pearl Cruse, Elmer Hildreth a 17-year-old non-student, attended a meeting between Miss Cruse and her teacher which ended in "a hand to hand" encounter between teacher and pupil. Hildreth became involved in a physical confrontation with school trustee Ingrim, whom he shot. He was found to have acted in self-defense. Ingrim survived the shooting.
September 12, 1905	Athens, Tennessee, United States	Ernest Powers, 15	1 dead		15-year-old student Ernest Powers fatally stabbed his teacher Elbert Wattanbarger when he attempted to whip him for throwing stones.

=== 1910s ===
Date	Location	Attacker(s)	Dead	Injured	Description
March 10, 1910	Ione, California, United States	Albert Brown; Eugene Griffin			At the reform school, Preston School of Industry, students Albert Brown and Eugene Griffin tried to escape after stealing a revolver from the school bakery. Griffin shot at Captain William H. White who pursued them. No one was hurt, but the two boys were transferred to the state penitentiary.
September 23, 1912	Sankt Pölten, Austria	Rudolf Hlawat	1 dead		Rudolf Hlawat, a student at a gymnasium in St. Pölten, shot at his teacher, Prof. Schmidt, with a revolver. He also shot at the school janitor before shooting himself twice in the head. Hlawat died in hospital, the only casualty.
October 9, 1913	Szeged, Hungary	Johann Skultety, 14	1 dead		After he had been reprimanded by his teacher, Prof. Horvarth, for missing classes, Johann Skultety, a gymnasium student in Szeged, barged into the classroom and fired with a revolver at the teacher, missing him. He committed suicide by shooting himself in the heart.
April 12, 1919	Ogden City, Utah, United States			1 injured	During a high school assembly, six boys shot off their guns, with permission, thinking they were loaded with blanks. Teacher Miss Verna Davidson was shot in the foot.

=== 1920s ===
Date	Location	Attacker(s)	Dead	Injured	Description
February 14, 1920	Durant, Oklahoma, United States			1 injured	At the Durant Normal School, teacher Albert McFarland, was shot and seriously wounded by one of his pupils.
March 4, 1920	Cincinnati, Ohio, United States	Lawrence Angel, 14		1 injured	Student, Lawrence Angel, 14 years old, shot his teacher Beatrice Conner through the arm for sending him to the principal's office.
March 12, 1920	Newberry, South Carolina, United States	William Scott		1 injured	William Scott, a student at the Helena Colored School, shot Henry Gray, another student.
May 1, 1920	Summerville, Georgia, United States	Alexander Potter, 15			At the High School, student Alexander Potter, 15 years old, fired six shots at his teacher, Prof. Ransom, but missed, upset after a severe thrashing. Potter was sentenced to 6 years at a reform school.
November 4, 1920	Middlesboro, Kentucky, United States	Adolphus Oaks	1 dead		Prof. Barnes of Middlesboro high school was fatally shot by Adolphus Oaks, for whipping his sister the week before. Oaks went to jail.
May 6, 1925	Wilno, Poland	22-year-old Stanisław Ławrynowicz, 21-year-old Janusz Obrąpalski	5 dead (including both perpetrators)	9 injured	Wilno school massacre. A massacre occurred at Joachim Lelewel high school in Wilno, Poland. At about 11 a.m., during the final exams, two eighth-grade students attacked the board of examiners with revolvers and hand grenades, killing two teachers, one student and themselves.
May 18, 1927	Bath, Michigan, United States	Andrew Kehoe, 55	45 dead (including the perpetrator)	58 injured	Bath School disaster. School board member Andrew Kehoe set up a series of explosions in the Bath Consolidated School. Before blowing up the school, Kehoe murdered his wife and set fire to his farmhouse. Kehoe detonated his shrapnel-filled vehicle outside the school, committing suicide and wounding others. The bombings constituted the deadliest act of mass murder in any type of school setting in U.S. history.
January 1929	Auckland, New Zealand	14-year-old male pupil			14-year-old pupil fired two shots with a firearm at New Plymouth Boys' High School.

=== 1930s ===
Date	Location	Attacker(s)	Dead	Injured	Description
March 5, 1931	Pristina, Yugoslavia			1 injured	A student named Ismailović shot and stabbed his teacher several times at a gymnasium in Pristina after he had been expelled due to low grades. Ismailović was later arrested at a cemetery when he tried to hang himself.
September 14, 1934	Gill, Massachusetts, United States		1 dead		Headmaster Elliott Speer was murdered by a shotgun blast through the window of his study at Northfield Mount Hermon School. The crime was never solved.
September 24, 1937	Toledo, Ohio, United States	Robert Snyder, 12		2 injured	12-year-old Robert Snyder shot and wounded his principal, June Mapes, in her office at Arlington public school when she declined his request to call a classmate. He later shot and wounded himself but survived.
June 24, 1939	Tirpan, Bulgaria	15-year-old student	4 dead		A 15-year-old student killed three teachers with a revolver at a school in Tirpan, southern Bulgaria after being expelled. The boy, who had already been expelled from three other schools during the year for bad behaviour, afterwards committed suicide.

=== 1940s ===
Date	Location	Attacker(s)	Dead	Injured	Description
May 6, 1940	South Pasadena, California, United States	Verlin Spencer, 38	5 dead	2 injured	South Pasadena Junior High School shooting. After being removed as principal of South Pasadena Junior High School, Verlin Spencer shot six school officials, killing five, before attempting to commit suicide by shooting himself in the stomach. He was sentenced to five consecutive life sentences, and was released early on parole in 1970.
May 23, 1940	New York City, New York, United States	Matthew Gillespie, 62		1 injured	Infuriated by a grievance, Matthew Gillespie, 62-year-old janitor at the junior school of the Dwight School for Girls, shot and critically wounded Mrs. Marshall Coxe, secretary of the junior school.
October 2, 1942	New York City, New York, United States	Joseph Annunziata, 19; Neil Simonelli, 16	1 dead		Joseph Annunziata and Neil Simonelli shot and killed teacher Irwin Goodman at William J. Gaynor Junior High School after he had caught them smoking in a wash room. Neither Annunziata nor Simonelli was a student at the school.
May 28, 1943	Brownsville, Pennsylvania, United States	Thomas Celestine, 16	1 dead		16-year-old Ettra Cimagha is stabbed to death by 16-year-old Thomas Celestine during a fight at Brownsville Junior High School.
June 26, 1946	New York City, New York, United States			1 injured	A 15-year-old student who balked at turning over his pocket money to a gang of seven youths was shot in the chest at Public School 147 annex of the Brooklyn High School for Automotive Trades.
June 6, 1947	King William, Virginia, United States	Robert Edward Lee, 20	1 dead		17-year-old Linwood Johnson Regensburg was stabbed to death by 20-year-old Robert Edward Lee at a dance held at King William High School. Neither Regensburg nor Lee was a student at the school.

=== 1950s ===
Date	Location	Attacker(s)	Dead	Injured	Description
July 22, 1950	New York City, New York, United States			1 injured	A 16-year-old boy was shot in the wrist and abdomen at the Public School 141 dance during an argument with a former classmate.
January 24, 1951	Alton, Illinois, United States	17-year-old student	1 dead		Henry Suhre, 61, quartermaster at Western Military Academy was shot to death in the cadet store on campus. A 17-year-old cadet was arrested.
March 12, 1951	Union Mills, North Carolina, United States	Billy Ray Powell, 16, Hugh Justice, 19	1 dead		Professor W. E. Sweatt, superintendent and teacher at the Alexander School, was shot to death by students Billy Ray Powell, 16, and Hugh Justice, 19. The assailants had been reprimanded by Sweatt, and accosted him outside his office.
June 4, 1951	New York City, New York, United States		1 dead		Carl Arch, a 50-year-old intruder to a girls' gym class, was shot and killed by a police officer at Manhattan's Central Commercial High School.
November 27, 1951	Saint Louis, Missouri, United States		1 dead		David Brooks, a 15-year-old student, was fatally shot as fellow pupils looked on in a grade school.
April 9, 1952	Rabun Gap, Georgia, United States	15-year-old student		1 injured	A 15-year-old boarding school student shot a dean rather than relinquish pin-up pictures of girls in bathing suits.
December 8, 1953	Aledo, Illinois, United States	James Gipson, 17	1 dead		26-year-old track coach George Marich was stabbed to death by 17-year-old student James Gipson in a hallway of Aledo High School. The stabbing occurred after Marich had removed Gipson and two other seniors from a study hall for creating a disturbance.
April 17, 1956	New York City, New York, United States	Randolph Lawrence, 16	1 dead		18-year-old Henry Smith, a student at a Bronx vocational high school, was stabbed to death by 16-year-old Randolph Lawrence, a fellow student. The stabbing was reportedly over a dispute about a basketball game.
May 4, 1956	Prince George's County, Maryland, United States	Billy Ray Prevatte, 15	1 dead	2 injured	15-year-old student Billy Prevatte fatally shot one teacher and injured two other persons at Maryland Park Junior High School in Prince George's County after he had been suspended from the school.
October 20, 1956	New York City, New York, United States			1 injured	A Booker T. Washington Junior High School student was wounded in the forearm by another student armed with a home-made weapon.
October 2, 1957	New York City, New York, United States			1 injured	A 16-year-old student was shot in the leg by a 15-year-old classmate at a city high school.
March 4, 1958	New York City, New York, United States			1 injured	A 17-year-old student shot a boy in the Manual Training High School.
April 29, 1958	Massapequa, New York, United States	Bruce Zator, 15	1 dead		15-year-old freshman Timothy Wall is shot to death by classmate Bruce Zator in a washroom of Massapequa High School.
May 1, 1958	Banning, California, United States	Jimmy Johnson, 16		1 injured	16-year-old Jimmy Johnson shot 31-year-old football coach Arthur Linden in the leg at Banning Union High School with a shotgun.
March 16, 1959	Edmonton, Alberta, Canada	Stan Williamson, 19	1 dead	5 injured	19-year-old Stan Williamson opened fire with a rifle inside Ross Sheppard High School, killing 16-year-old Howard Gates and wounding five teenage girls. Three 18-year-old students tackled him and held the gunman down until he could be arrested by police.

=== 1960s ===
Date	Location	Attacker(s)	Dead	Injured	Description
March 30, 1960	Alice, Texas, United States	Donna Dvorak, 14	1 dead		Donna Dvorak, 14, brought a target pistol to Dubose Junior High School, and fatally shot Bobby Whitford, 15, in their 9th grade science class. Dvorak believed Whitford posed a threat to one of her girlfriends.
March 4, 1961	Kungälv, Sweden	Ove Conry Andersson, 17	1 dead	6 injured	Kungälv school shooting. A 17-year-old student fired fifteen bullets into a crowd at a school dance at Kungälvs Läroverk (a/k/a Thorildskolan), killing one student and wounding six others before escaping. He turned himself in to local police the following morning and was arrested.
October 17, 1961	Denver, Colorado, United States	Tennyson Beard, 14	1 dead	1 injured	Tennyson Beard, 14, got into an argument with William Hachmeister, 15, at Morey Junior High School. During the argument Beard pulled out a revolver and shot at Hachmeister, wounding him. Deborah Faith Humphrey, 14, was fatally wounded by another shot. Beard was arrested after fleeing the school.
January 26, 1962	Yonghe Township, Taipei County, Taiwan	Tsui Yin, 41	7 dead	3 injured	Tsui Yin, a 41-year-old former physical education teacher at Li Shing junior high school in Taipei, shot and killed the principal, the principal's wife and five other faculty members with a pistol, in revenge for his dismissal. He wounded three others, among them the principal's daughter, before escaping in a taxi. He was arrested and sentenced to death.
May 7, 1963	Paterson, New Jersey	Ralph Best, 43		6 injured	Gun engraver Ralph Best opened fire from his second floor room with a .22 caliber hunting rifle on 50 children playing in the schoolyard at Paterson School 14 on the evening of May 7, 1963. An alcoholic and epileptic, he fired after the children ignored his demands they leave the playground. Charged with "atrocious assault", Best pled insanity. His first trial ended in a mistrial, and he was never re-tried.
April 27, 1966	Bay Shore, New York, United States	James Arthur Frampton, 16	1 dead		Teacher John S. Lane, 48, was shot and fatally wounded when he tried to stop 16-year-old student James Arthur Frampton, who was walking with a shotgun in the high school, seeking students with whom he had argued. Lane died of his wounds on June 13, 1966.
October 5, 1966	Grand Rapids, Minnesota, United States	David M. Black Jr., 15	1 dead	1 injured	David Black, a 15-year-old student at Grand Rapids High School, took a pistol to school, shooting student Kevin Roth and administrator Forrest L. Willey, with whom he had argued. Willey died of his wound eight days later.
September 26, 1967	Dayton, Ohio, United States	Will Edward Dixon, 19	1 dead		Thomas Prinz, a 21-year-old football coach at Wilbur Wright High School, was stabbed to death by 19-year-old Will Edward Dixon. The stabbing occurred when Prinz attempted to escort Dixon off the playing field. Dixon was a former student and drop-out from the school.
November 1, 1967	Dundee, Scotland, United Kingdom	Robert Mone, 19	1 dead		19-year-old soldier Robert Mone entered St John's RC High School armed with a shotgun and took a class hostage. He sexually abused the children. The teacher, Nanette Hanson, convinced Mone, who had already raped one girl, to let the children go. Mone fatally shot her in the head. Mone had been expelled three years before and was apparently seeking revenge; he was found to be insane and sent to the State Hospital in Carstairs.
January 30, 1968	Miami, Florida, United States	Blanche Patricia Ward, 16	1 dead		16-year-old Blanche Ward shot and killed fellow student Linda Lipscomb, 16, with a pistol at Miami Jackson High School. According to Ward, she was threatened with a razor by Lipscomb during an argument and in the ensuing struggle her gun went off.
March 25, 1968	High Point, North Carolina, United States	Gerald Locklear, 16	1 dead		David Walker, 15, was shot to death just outside Central High School by Gerald Locklear, 15.
May 22, 1968	Miami, Florida, United States	Ernest Lee Grissom, 15		2 injured	Ernest Lee Grissom, a 15-year-old student at Drew Junior High School, shot and seriously wounded a teacher and a 13-year-old student after he had been reprimanded for a disturbance.
January 23, 1969	Washington, District of Columbia, United States	Ronald Joyner, 18	1 dead		Cardozo Senior High School assistant principal Herman Clifford, 45, was shot to death in the hallway by Ronald Joyner, 18, while scuffling with three youths who robbed the school's bank.
May 7, 1969	Nuannuan District, Keelung, Taiwan	Zhou Zhenlong	1 dead		An 11th grader in Keelung High School, Zhou Zhenlong (周振隆), killed his homeroom teacher, Jiang Xintong (江新同), with an ax.
November 19, 1969	Tomah, Wisconsin, United States	14-year-old student	1 dead		Principal Martin Mogensen is shot to death in his office by a 14-year-old boy armed with a shotgun.

=== 1970s ===
Date	Location	Attacker(s)	Dead	Injured	Description
January 5, 1970	Washington, District of Columbia, United States	Unnamed student	1 dead	1 injured	Tyrone Perry, 15, was shot to death and a 14-year-old boy was wounded at Hine Junior High School.
April 10, 1970	Pierz, Minnesota, United States	Roger Arkuszewski, 18	1 dead		Roger Arkuszewski, 18-year-old student, was strangled to death at Pierz Healy High School by school librarian Richard Zaun. Zaun was charged with first degree murder in the strangulation.
February 1, 1971	Philadelphia, Pennsylvania, United States	Kevin Simmons, 14	1 dead		Samson L. Freedman, a 56-year-old art teacher, was shot to death by Kevin Simmons at Leeds Junior High School, after having the student suspended for cursing.
November 3, 1971	Carlsbad, New Mexico, United States	Michael O'Hearn, 22	1 dead (the perpetrator)	1 injured	Michael O'Hearn barricaded himself in a storage tower of Carlsbad Mid-High School, in Carlsbad, New Mexico, for about two hours with two firearms. He fired about two dozen rounds at police officers, injuring one, before committing suicide.
December 6, 1971	Mar del Plata, Buenos Aires, Argentina	Parapolice group	1 dead	4 injured	A group of the National University Concentration (CNU), dissolves a student assembly of protest within the University of Mar del Plata, at least two policemen shoot the students and killing the student Silvia Filler with a shot in the forehead, and injuring 4 other students.
January 24, 1972	Stow, Ohio, United States			1 injured	A 16-year-old student at Stow High School shot and wounded his chemistry teacher during an argument.
January 7–12, 1973	Balassagyarmat, Hungary	András Pintye, 18 and László Pintye, 17	1 dead	Several hostages required medical attention	Brothers András and László Pintye, sons of local Communist Party officials, acquired a PA-63 pistol and an AMD assault rifle and assaulted a local girls' dormitory. They held an unknown number of teenage girls hostage for several days, demanding free passage to Budapest's international airport and a flight to Austria. Finally, when they planned to murder some of the hostages, a police sniper shot András dead through the window, the police then stormed the building, arresting László. He was sentenced to 15 years in prison, from which he was released in 1984, serving a little more than 11 years. Four other persons were sentenced for aiding the perpetrators. The case deeply traumatized Hungary which had never seen such events before. A feature film titled Túsztörténet (Hostage Story) was made about the events in 1989.
February 26, 1973	Richmond, Virginia, United States		1 dead		Wayne Phillips, 17, was shot to death when he was caught between two youths who were fighting in the hallway of Armstrong High School.
July 1973	Mashonaland Central province, Zimbabwe				In the attack on St Alberts School, Zimbabwe African National Liberation Army (ZANLA) cadres captured 292 pupils and staff from the school and force-marched them north towards Mozambique, where the ZANLA bases were. The march was intercepted by the Rhodesian Security Forces before the cadres crossed the border, and all but eight of the children and staff were recovered.
February 2, 1974	San Luca, Italy		1 dead		A student shot and killed his teacher, Silvio Strangio, after he had been reprimanded for distracting his classmates.
March 22, 1974	Brownstown, Indiana, United States		1 dead		Jessie Blevins, 48, athletic director at Brownstown Central High School, was shot to death in the school parking lot by a 17-year-old student.
December 30, 1974	Olean, New York, United States	Anthony Barbaro, 17	3 dead	11 injured	1974 Olean High School shooting. 17-year-old student Anthony Barbaro indiscriminately shot at people on the street from windows at the third floor of the school building. He killed three people and wounded 11 before police managed to subdue him.
March 18, 1975	St. Louis, Missouri, United States		1 dead		16-year-old Stephen Goods, a bystander, is shot and killed during a fight between other teens at Sumner High School.
May 28, 1975	Brampton, Ontario, Canada	Michael Slobodian, 16	3 dead	13 injured	Centennial Secondary School shooting. Michael Slobodian, 16, killed a teacher and student and wounded 13 others at Brampton Centennial Secondary School in Brampton, Ontario, before fatally shooting himself.
September 11, 1975	Oklahoma City, Oklahoma, United States	James Briggs, 15	1 dead	5 injured	Grant High School student Randy Truitt was shot and killed by James Briggs at the school, who also wounded several others.
October 27, 1975	Ottawa, Ontario, Canada	Robert Poulin, 18	3 dead	5 injured	St. Pius X High School shooting. 18-year-old Robert Poulin opened fire on his class with a shotgun at St. Pius X High School, killing one and wounding five before turning the gun on himself. Poulin had raped and stabbed his 17-year-old friend Kim Rabot to death prior to the shooting.
February 12, 1976	Detroit, Michigan, United States			5 injured	Intruders shot five Murray-Wright High School students after an apparent dispute over one of the intruder's girlfriends.
April 7, 1977	Whitharral, Texas, United States	Ricardo Lopez, 17	1 dead		High School principal M. O. Tripp was shot to death on the front steps of the school by Ricardo Lopez, 17.
December 12, 1977	Winter Garden, Florida, United States	Roosevelt Holloman, 41	1 dead		During an after-school meeting at West Orange High School to discuss his illegal advances toward a 16-year-old girl, 41-year-old assistant principal Roosevelt Holloman pulled out a gun and shot principal Raymond Screws, 51, to death. Holloman also shot at two other school officials but missed. Holloman surrendered his gun to a janitor and waited until being arrested. He was later convicted of first-degree murder.
January 4, 1978	New York City, New York, United States	Everton Lazarus, 16	1 dead		Michael Kittrell, 15, was stabbed to death by another student at John Adams High School.
February 22, 1978	Lansing, Michigan, United States	Roger Needham, 15	1 dead	1 injured	Roger Needham, a 15-year-old student, shot two students at Everett High School. One of the students, 15-year-old Bill Draher, died of his gunshot wound.
May 18, 1978	Austin, Texas, United States	John Daniel Christian, 13	1 dead		13-year-old honor student John Christian, son of former LBJ press secretary George Christian, fatally shot his teacher, 29-year-old Rod Grayson, three times at Murchison Junior High School. Christian fled the school building and was subdued by gym coach Larry Schirpik. Christian's attorney, Roy Minton, argued Christian was not guilty by reason of insanity, and district attorney Ronnie Earle did not object. The case did not go to trial. Christian was treated for two years at a private mental health facility in Dallas paid for by his family.
October 1978	Winnipeg, Manitoba, Canada	Vaughan Pollen, 17	1 dead		A 16-year-old student, Kenneth Maitland, was shot to death with a shotgun by 17-year-old student, Vaughan Pollen, at Sturgeon Creek Regional Secondary School. Pollen was charged with murder but during the trial found unfit to stand trial by reason of a mental disorder. He was committed to a mental health facility for treatment of paranoid schizophrenia and treated for 7 years.
January 29, 1979	San Diego, California, United States	Brenda Spencer	2 dead	9 injured	1979 Cleveland Elementary School shooting. A 16-year-old student, Brenda Spencer, began shooting from her home at children who were waiting outside Cleveland Elementary School for principal Burton Wragg (aged 53) to open the gates. She injured eight children. Wragg was killed while trying to help the children. Custodian Mike Suchar (aged 56) was killed while trying to pull a student to safety. Asked by a reporter why she committed the crime, Spencer is said to have replied "I Don't Like Mondays"
February 2, 1979	Castellón de la Plana, Spain		1 dead		Two students brutally beat up their principal, Antonio Armelles Doménech, in his office. One of them pointed a gun at him and threatened him while the other stabbed him in the neck with a knife. On March 7 of the same year, Antonio died in hospital.

=== 1980s ===
Date	Location	Attacker(s)	Dead	Injured	Description
January 7, 1980	Stamps, Arkansas, United States	Evan Hampton, 16	1 dead		Evan Hampton, 16, high school freshman student at Stamps High School, shot Mike Sanders, 19, twice in the chest and once in the temple, killing him instantly. He was arrested.
October 31, 1980	Hueytown, Alabama, United States	Rudy Farmer, 17		1 injured	17-year-old Rudy Farmer pulled out a pistol and shot a fellow student in the art room at Hueytown High School. That student was wounded. Farmer fatally shot himself.
March 26, 1981	Turku, Finland	Jarmo Siltala, 18	1 dead		18-year-old Jarmo Siltala killed a teacher at Puolalanmäki Upper Secondary School with a shovel.
October 2, 1981	Greenville, South Carolina, United States	Jewel Loraine Garrett, 18	1 dead		Henry Chiariello, a 30-year-old social studies teacher, was stabbed to death at Greenville High School by 18-year-old student Jewel Garrett. Garrett was later sentenced to life in prison.
January 12, 1982	Miami, Florida, United States	Steven Wayne Holmes, 15	1 dead		Francisco Walker, 24, a sixth-grade teacher at Edison Middle School, was stabbed to death by a trespasser, 15-year-old Steven Wayne Holmes. He was later arrested and charged with first degree murder.
March 19, 1982	Las Vegas, Nevada, United States	Patrick Lizotte, 17	1 dead	3 injured	Clarence Piggott, a 55-year-old psychology and sociology teacher, was shot to death and two students were wounded by a high school senior. The student was later shot and wounded by police before arrest. Lizotte is sentenced to two consecutive life sentences without the possibility of parole. However, he was granted parole on March 6, 2017, after a Nevada law banning life without parole for juveniles reduced his sentence to 20 years to life.
April 7, 1982	Littleton, Colorado, United States	Jason Rocha, 14	1 dead		Jason Rocha, a 14-year-old student, shot and killed 13 year-old Scott Darwin Michael, a fellow student at Deer Creek Middle School in Littleton, Colorado. Rocha was charged as an adult and sentenced to 12-years in prison for the murder.
January 20, 1983	St. Louis County, Missouri, United States	David F. Lawler, 14	2 dead	1 injured	14-year-old David F. Lawler took two family pistols to school and shot two classmates, killing one and injuring the other. He then committed suicide. See Parkway South Junior High School killings for more information.
May 16, 1983	Dallas, Texas, United States	Billy Conn Gardner	1 dead		Billy Conn Gardner, a friend of a food service worker's husband, robbed the Lake Highlands High School cafeteria at gunpoint, shot the food service director, and left with $1,600. The food service director, Thelma Row, died eleven days later from the injuries. Gardner was later apprehended, convicted, and sentenced to death for the crime. The State of Texas executed him on February 16, 1995.
June 3, 1983	Eppstein-Vockenhausen, Germany	Karel Charva, 34	6 dead (including the perpetrator)	14 injured	Eppstein school shooting. Thirty-five-year-old Czech refugee Karel Charva, fatally shot three students, a teacher and a police officer, and injured another 14 people with two semi-automatic pistols, before committing suicide at the Freiherr-vom-Stein Gesamtschule.
December 16, 1983	Rockford, Illinois, United States	Michael Graham, 15		1 injured	Michael Graham, a 15-year-old student at Boylan Central Catholic High School, shot and wounded his German teacher, Sharon Mundt, who had disciplined him for misbehavior.
March 13, 1984	Castres, France	15-year-old male student	1 dead		A 15-year-old student killed his teacher, who had sent him to the headmaster for being late, and shot himself in the head. He died on the way to the hospital.
March 23, 1984	Huelva, Spain	Carlos Sánchez Caballero	1 dead		A former student and son of a former teacher at the Huelva Primary School of Teachers, stabbed the teacher and head of studies Pilar Martínez Cruz to death. The former student revealed that he tried to rape her 15 days ago but failed. The former student had been taken to psychiatric treatment for several months before and after the attempted rape and murder. This was the first student-teacher murder by a single assailant to occur in a school in Spain, followed by the one in Barcelona in 2015 where another student murdered his teacher and the first school murder in the history of Spain.
December 12, 1984	Kuusankoski, Finland	14-year-old male student	1 dead		56-year-old female teacher Hilkka Rask was stabbed to death by a 14-year-old male student at Naukio comprehensive school.
January 21, 1985	Goddard, Kansas, United States,	James Kearbey, 14	1 dead	3 injured	14-year-old James Kearbey, a student at Goddard Middle School, had a M1A rifle and Smith & Wesson .357 Magnum revolver that he used to fatally shoot his principal and wound three teachers.
March 29, 1985	Spartanburg, South Carolina, United States				A 15-year-old freshman held four students hostage at Paul M. Dorman High School, after being accused of drinking and returning to the school with a loaded .38 Colt revolver.
October 18, 1985	Detroit, Michigan, United States			6 injured	During halftime of the homecoming football game between Northwestern and Murray-Wright high schools, a boy who had been in a fight earlier that day retaliated with a shotgun, wounding six students.
December 3, 1985	Concord, New Hampshire, United States	Louis Cartier, 16	1 dead		At Concord High School, Louis "Louie" Cartier, a 16-year-old male dropout, entered the school with a shotgun and took two students hostage. Responding officers fatally shot him as he aimed at a teacher.
December 10, 1985	Portland, Connecticut, United States	Floyd Warmsley, 13	1 dead	2 injured	13-year-old student Floyd Warmsley fatally shot a school custodian, wounded both the principal and school secretary, and held a student hostage with an assault pistol at Portland Junior High School in Portland, Connecticut after he had been suspended for a minor issue. His aunt convinced him to surrender.
March 6, 1986	Dolton, Illinois, United States	14-year-old student		1 injured	A 14-year-old student shot and wounded his math teacher at Thornridge High School.
October 8, 1986	Dallas, Texas, United States	Kenneth Lee Jackson, 19	1 dead		16-year-old Cody Cobbins was shot and killed on a school bus by the older brother of a 17-year-old boy he was arguing with over a seat.
December 4, 1986	Lewistown, Montana, United States	Kristopher Hans, 14	1 dead	3 injured	14-year-old Kristofer Hans, angry over a failing grade, shot and killed a substitute teacher, later wounding a vice principal and two students, he is now serving two life sentences in prison.
March 2, 1987	De Kalb, Missouri, United States	Nathan Ferris, 12	2 dead		After constant teasing about his weight, Nathan Ferris used a pistol to kill a student who bullied him in class. Ferris then killed himself with the gun.
April 16, 1987	Detroit, Michigan, United States		1 dead	3 injured	A ninth-grade Murray–Wright High School student killed Chester Jackson, 17, and wounded Damon Matthews, 17, and Tomeka Turner, 18.
September 28, 1987	Lansing, Illinois, United States	Blake Docter, 16		1 injured	After being kicked off the soccer team for smoking on school grounds, Illiana Christian High School student Blake Docter, 16, shot and wounded John Hoogewerf, the teacher who had caught him smoking.
December, 1987	Moscow, Soviet Union	Grigory Kuts	1 dead		Grigory Kuts killed his physical education teacher with a TT pistol after classes. Earlier Kuts shot dead plant director. He was sentenced to 15 years in prison as a minor. He was later sentenced to death for another murder in prison.
January 6, 1988	Higham Ferrers, United Kingdom	Darren Lloyd Fowler, 15–16		4 injured	Three months after he was expelled, Darren Lloyd Fowler returned to his former school, shooting two teachers and two pupils before he was overpowered by staff.
February 11, 1988	Pinellas Park, Florida, United States	Jason Edward Harless, 15; Jason McCoy, 15	1 dead	3 injured	Pinellas Park High School shooting. Students Jason Harless and Jason McCoy, both students, brought stolen guns to school, where they killed principal Richard Allen and injured an assistant principal and an assistant physical education teacher. Harless was shot and wounded by police and McCoy was arrested without injury. Both served prison terms.
November 22, 1988	Abilene, Texas, United States	Mason Staggs, 16		1 injured	Mason Staggs, 16, shot Cooper High School teacher Rick Maloney in the face with a derringer, severely injuring him. Staggs then left the school and went fishing.
November 28, 1988	Sabadell, Spain	Miguel Ángel Martínez García, 17	1 dead		A 17-year-old student beat Maria Ambrosia Dominguez Turne, 14, to death inside the school in the early hours of that day. Her body was found at about 7 a.m. and he was arrested in connection with the murder.
December 16, 1988	Virginia Beach, Virginia, United States	Nicholas Elliott, 16	1 dead	1 injured	Nicholas Elliott came to Atlantic Shores Christian School with a firearm bought by an adult relative. He shot two teachers, one fatally, before entering a portable classroom full of students. The gun jammed and Elliott was tackled. Elliott complained of being teased and bullied, Elliott was later sentenced to life in prison in 1989.
January 24, 1989	Rauma, Finland	Tero Toivola, 14	2 dead		Raumanmeri school shooting. Two students, Kristian Johtela, 15 and Juha Suominen, 14 were fatally shot by a 14-year-old student Tero Toivola at the Raumanmeri secondary school, in Rauma, Finland. The shooter had claimed to be a victim of bullying.

=== 1990s ===
Date	Location	Attacker(s)	Dead	Injured	Description
May 20, 1990	Centerville, Tennessee, United States	Donald Wayne Givens, 50	1 dead		High School Principal Ron Wallace, 41, was shot by science teacher Donald Wayne Givens, 50, when Givens was caught by Wallace attempting to set fire to several areas of the high school two days before graduation ceremonies were scheduled.
August 26, 1990	Las Vegas, Nevada, United States	Curtis Collins, 15	1 dead		Curtis Collins, a sophomore at Eldorado High School, shot and killed 16-year-old Donnie Lee Bolden inside the school cafeteria. Police said that the shooting was gang-related.
September 21, 1990	Houston, Texas, United States	16-year-old student	1 dead		A 16-year-old girl fatally stabbed her classmate, 18-year-old Anthony Johnson, in the upper back with a hunting knife in a classroom at Jesse H. Jones High School, in Houston, Texas; Johnson later died at Ben Taub Hospital. The suspect was then placed in the Harris County Juvenile Probation Department. It was reported that the possible motive was the victim making an insulting comment about the suspect's clothing.
February 21, 1991	Madrid, Spain	Mauricio Triguero Triguero, 53	1 dead		A 53-year-old teacher and parricide entered a classroom and fatally stabbed María Esteban Muñoz, with 26 stab wounds, in the classroom where she taught 28 children in the first year of primary school, aged between 6 and 7 years old. The murderer was arrested and tapes recorded by him were revealed.
April 10, 1991	Glasgow, Scotland, United Kingdom	Barbara Glover, 16	1 dead		16-year-old Diane Watson is stabbed to death by 16-year-old Barbara Glover at Whitehill Secondary School in the Dennistoun area of Glasgow. Both Watson and Glover were students at the school.
April 23, 1991	Compton, California, United States		1 dead		A teenager aimed and fired a handgun at a security guard who had chased him and three friends off the grounds of Ralph J. Bunche Middle School. However, instead of hitting his intended target, the bullet struck 11-year-old bystander Alejandro Vargas, a student at the school, killing him.
May 9, 1991	Reserve, Louisiana, United States	Brenda Carter, 16	1 dead		19-year-old senior Debbie Morantes is stabbed to death by 16-year-old sophomore Brenda Carter inside the cafeteria of East St. John High School. Brenda Carter was convicted of second-degree murder two years later.
June 19, 1991	Coffs Harbour, Australia	13-year-old student			A student brought a rifle to Orara High School injuring 2 teachers and 1 student. The shooter was tackled to the ground by fellow students.
September 30, 1991	Indianapolis, Indiana, United States	Edward C. Ector, 15	1 dead		17-year-old Bertram Bowman is stabbed to death in the cafeteria of Arlington High School, reportedly in a dispute over a girl. Police arrested 15-year-old Edward C. Ector after the attack.
October 9, 1991	New York City, New York, United States		1 dead		17-year-old Tryon Whittaker was shot to death by another youth outside of James Monroe High School in The Bronx. The boys had reportedly got into an argument and Whittaker challenged the other youth to a fight. The youth then walked away but returned with a gun and shot Whittaker.
November 14, 1991	Houston, Texas, United States	16-year-old student		1 injured	18-year-old Francisco Contreras was shot four times in his feet and leg outside the cafeteria of Milby High School, in Houston, Texas, by a 16-year-old student, who was arrested afterward.
November 25, 1991	New York City, New York, United States	Jason Bentley, 14	1 dead		Thomas Jefferson High School A stray bullet kills a 16-year-old student during an argument between two other teens. Shooter Jason Bentley, 14, is sentenced in 1992 to three to nine years in prison.
February 25, 1992	Archdale, North Carolina, United States	Willis Odell Gravely Jr., 16	1 dead		Archdale-Trinity Middle School. 16-year-old Willis Odell Gravely Jr. stabs 14-year-old ex-girlfriend in 8th grade classroom causing death.
February 26, 1992	New York City, New York, United States	Kahlil Sumpter, 15	2 dead		Thomas Jefferson High School was the scene of its second shooting of the school year, when a 15-year-old shot and killed two other students. The shooter, Kahlil Sumpter, is sentenced in 1993 to between 6 2/3 and 20 years in prison and is released in 1998.
May 1, 1992	Olivehurst, California, United States	Eric Houston, 20	4 dead	10 injured	Lindhurst High School shooting. Armed with a pump-action shotgun and sawed-off .22 caliber semi-automatic rifle, 20-year-old Eric Houston took hostages at his former high school, killing four people and wounding 10. His motive was his inability to find a good job because he had failed a grade at school. He was given the death penalty for the shooting.
May 14, 1992	Napa, California, United States	John McMahan, 14		2 injured	Armed with a .357-caliber pistol, 14-year-old student John McMahan opened fire in a science classroom, wounding two.
September 11, 1992	Amarillo, Texas, United States	Randy Earl Matthews, 17; unnamed 15-year-old		6 injured	Six students were shot at Palo Duro High School, all survived the shooting. Police later arrested 17-year-old Randy Earl Matthews and an unidentified 15-year-old boy in connection with the shooting.
September 21, 1992	New York City, New York, United States	Michael Bubb, 15	1 dead		Damion Ennis, 15, is stabbed to death by a fellow student in a hallway of South Shore High School.
January 18, 1993	Grayson, Kentucky, United States	Gary Scott Pennington, 17	2 dead		East Carter High School Shooting. Scott Pennington shot and killed teacher Deanna McDavid and custodian Marvin Hicks after entering McDavid's classroom at East Carter High School. Pennington was later found guilty of the murders and sentenced to life imprisonment.
February 1, 1993	Amityville, New York, United States	Shem S. McCoy, 17	1 dead	1 injured	Shem S. McCoy, 17, shot two people, both cousins of his, at Amityville High School. One of those shot, Randel Artis, would die of his gunshot injuries. The three boys had apparently been engaged in a long running dispute.
February 22, 1993	Los Angeles, California, United States	Robert Heard, 15	1 dead		15-year-old Robert Heard shot and killed 17-year-old Michael Shean Ensley in a corridor of Reseda High School.
February 24, 1993	New York City, New York, United States	Justin Rodriguez, 15	1 dead		15-year-old Angel Jimenez is stabbed to death by another 15-year-old student in a hallway of Junior High School 25. The stabbing was sparked by a dispute between the two boys over who owned a pair of sunglasses.
March 18, 1993	Harlem, Georgia, United States	Edward Bryant Gillom, 15	1 dead	1 injured	Edward Bryant Gillom, a freshman at Harlem High School, shot two fellow students, killing 15-year-old Ronrecas Gibson.
April 12, 1993	Dartmouth, Massachusetts, United States	Karter Reed, Gator Collet and Nigel Thomas	1 dead		Thomas and Colet held down 16-year-old Jason Robinson while Reed stabbed him eight times.
April 15, 1993	Acushnet, Massachusetts, United States	David Taber, 44	1 dead		44-year-old David Taber invades Ford Middle School and takes three hostages. He later shoots and kills school nurse Carol Day. He is found not guilty of the murder by reason of insanity.
May 24, 1993	Pennsburg, Pennsylvania, United States	Jason Smith, 15	1 dead		Upper Perkiomen High School, 15-year-old student Jason Smith shoots and kills another student who had bullied him. He is sentenced to between 12 and 25 years in prison.
September 17, 1993	Sheridan, Wyoming, United States	Kevin Newman, 29	1 dead	4 injured	4 students of a physical education class were wounded at Central Middle School in Sheridan, Wyoming, when 29-year-old Kevin Newman fired at them with a handgun. He then committed suicide by shooting himself in the head. A suicide note found in Newman's motel room revealed that he was unhappy with his life and thought of himself as an evil person.
September 17, 1993	Darien, Illinois, United States	Phillip Powell, 15	1 dead		15-year-old Phillip Powell killed Barrett Modisette (17) at the Hinsdale South High School parking lot. Powell was a self-described gang member who shot Barrett because Barrett was protecting his younger brother from Powell's verbal bullying. Powell was tried as an adult and was sentenced to 37 years in prison in 1994.
October 6, 1993	Hausleiten, Austria	13-year-old student	1 dead (the perpetrator)	1 injured	A 13-year-old student, waiting at the entrance of the Hauptschule in Hausleiten, shot and wounded the principal of the school with a rifle before committing suicide. The student was caught smoking the day before and the principal told the boy he had to inform his parents about it.
December 1, 1993	Wauwatosa, Wisconsin, United States	Leonard McDowell, 21	1 dead		Leonard McDowell, a 21-year-old former student at Wauwatosa West High School, shot Associate Principal Dale Breitlow three times with a .44-cal. Taurus revolver in a second-floor hallway. McDowell was found guilty of the murder and sane at the time of the shooting. His life sentence was upheld by the state Court of Appeals in April, 1997.
December 17, 1993	Chelsea, Michigan, United States	Stephen Leith	1 dead	2 injured	Steve Leith, a science teacher at Chelsea High School walked into a staff meeting being held at the school and shot and killed the district superintendent and wounded the school principal and a teacher. Leith was then arrested by police.
January 31, 1994	Seattle, Washington, United States	Darrell Cloud, 24	1 dead		24-year-old Darrell Cloud entered Whitman Middle School and shot his former teacher, 45-year-old Neal Summers, to death. Cloud would serve nine years in prison for the murder. The motive for the shooting was sexual abuse that was alleged to have been perpetrated by Summers against Cloud since Cloud was 13 years old.
March 1, 1994	Boonville, Missouri, United States	Dante D. Hayes, 33	2 dead		Dante D. Hayes, 33, a hunter and ex-convict, shot and killed Richard Vancena, 58, a cafeteria manager, and Robin Michelle Coleman, 33, a cook, in the mess hall of Kemper Military School. He was drunk and looking for his wife Anna Hayes with whom he had a fight the night before. No students were harmed.
March 15, 1994	San Pablo, California, United States	Juan Miguel Chavez-Garcia, 18	1 dead		At Edward M. Downer Elementary School 15-year-old Cecelia Rios who walked through the school as a shortcut to her home was ambushed by 18-year-old Juan Miguel Chavez-Garcia, who raped her, stripped her hair and stabbed her 18 times, killing her. A red bandanna was draped over her body. The red bandanna is sometimes used as a gang identifier, however police decline to say if her killing was gang related or not.
March 23, 1994	Seattle, Washington, United States	Brian Ronquillo, Cesar Sarausad II, 19	1 dead	1 injured	A gang-related drive-by shooting outside Ballard High School resulted in the death of 16-year-old student Melissa Fernandes and the wounding of 17-year-old student Brent Mason. Police later arrested two men in connection with the shooting.
March 28, 1994	Acklam, Middlesbrough, United Kingdom	Stephen Wilkinson, 29	1 dead	2 injured	Stephen Wilkinson burst into a mathematics classroom at Hall Garth Community Arts College and stabbed three children, including 12-year-old Nikki Conroy who later died from her injuries.
March 30, 1994	Hinesville, Georgia, United States	Bernard P. Townsend, 19	1 dead		At the Bradwell Institute during a fight in the schools parking lot, Bernard P. Townsend stabbed to death classmate 18-year-old George Jenkins.
May 26, 1994	Union, Kentucky, United States	Clay Shrout, 17	4 dead		Clay Shrout killed his mother, father, and two younger sisters before embarking a hostage situation at Ryle High School in a trigonometry classroom, he was found guilty yet mentally ill and is now serving life in prison with 25 year before parole.
June 17, 1994	Holywood, Northern Ireland, United Kingdom	Garnet Bell, 46		6 injured	A former pupil bearing a grudge entered an assembly hall at Sullivan Upper School and used a flamethrower to attack students taking A-Level examinations. Six were injured; three seriously, Bell was later sentenced to life behind prison but died there in 1997 from cancer.
September 8, 1994	Hollywood, California, United States		1 dead		Rolando Ruiz, 17, was shot dead on the campus of Hollywood High School. Police suspected that the shooting was gang-related.
September 19, 1994	Soweto, South Africa	18-year-old student		7 injured	An 18-year-old student shot and wounded seven of his schoolmates with a rifle, after he had been reprimanded. The youth then escaped in his father's car.
October 12, 1994	Zhutian, Pingtung County, Taiwan	Xie, 9th grader	1 dead		A 9th grader surnamed Xie (謝) in Jutian Junior High School threw a school bag weighed one and half kilograms toward the head of the 53-year-old school dean Huang Xinhua (黃信樺) teaching mathematics, after being slapped in the face in a quarrel in class, and the dean died on October 15, 1994, in a hospital.
October 12, 1994	Greensboro, North Carolina, United States	Nicholas Atkinson, 16	1 dead (the perpetrator)	1 injured	Nicholas Atkinson, a 16-year-old Grimsley High School student, returned to campus after being suspended. He proceeded to shoot and wound the assistant principal with a 9 mm handgun before committing suicide.
October 25, 1994	Mount Vernon, New York, United States	Hopeton Minott, 17	1 dead		17-year-old Shebule Jackson is stabbed to death by fellow student Hopeton Minott in a corridor of Mount Vernon High School.
November 7, 1994	Wickliffe, Ohio, United States	Keith A. Ledeger, 37	1 dead	3 injured	Wickliffe Middle School shooting. 37-year-old Keith A. Ledeger, a former student, entered Wickliffe Middle School in Wickliffe, Ohio with a 12 gauge shotgun. He shot and killed a custodian and wounded the assistant principal, a teacher and a police officer before being arrested.
January 5, 1995	Washington, District of Columbia, United States	Unnamed 14-year-old	1 dead		16-year-old Antar A. Hall is shot to death by a 14-year-old boy at the entrance of Cardozo High School.
January 12, 1995	Seattle, Washington, United States	15-year-old student		2 injured	A 15-year-old Garfield High School student left school during the day and returned with his grandfather's 9mm semiautomatic handgun. He wounded two students.
January 24, 1995	St. Louis, Missouri, United States	Michael Taylor, 15	1 dead		Taylor raped and murdered Christine Smetzer, 15, in a bathroom at McCluer North High School in St Louis County. He later murdered his cellmate Shackrein Thomas, 20, while incarcerated.
February 1, 1995	Charlotte Amalie, United States Virgin Islands, United States	Nashibo George, 14	1 dead		Lamar Knight is stabbed to death by fellow student Nashibo George after a fight at Charlotte Amalie High School. Nashibo George is found guilty of voluntary manslaughter on February 20, 2004.
May 18, 1995	Harbor City, Los Angeles, California, United States	10 students	1 dead		At Narbonne High School, junior student Shazeb Andleeb was physically assaulted by 10 students who repeatedly shoved, punched and stomped on him until he became unconscious, Andleeb later died from his injuries.
August 29, 1995	Laredo, Texas, United States	Jonah Iverson, 12	1 dead		12-year-old Jonah Iverson shot and killed a fellow student, 12-year-old Lizzy Rivera, in a washroom of Memorial Middle School.
September 21, 1995	Rochester, New York, United States	Michelle Wright, 12	1 dead		13-year-old Stephne Givens was fatally stabbed at Jefferson Middle School by a fellow student.
September 29, 1995	Tavares, Florida, United States	Keith E. Johnson, 14	1 dead		Tavares Middle School student Keith E. Johnson, 14, shot and killed Joey Summerall, 13, with a 9mm semiautomatic handgun that he had stolen from his neighbors home. He was sentenced to life in prison without the possibility of parole. But has since been resentenced and is now on probation.
October 12, 1995	South Carolina, United States	Toby R. Sincino, 16	2 dead	1 injured	After being suspended for making an obscene gesture, 16-year-old Toby Sincino shot and injured a math teacher, then shooting and killing another math teacher before turning the gun on himself.
November 15, 1995	Lynnville, Tennessee, United States	Jamie Rouse, 17	2 dead	1 injured	The Richland High School shooting occurred when 17-year-old Jamie Rouse walked into the school and shot two teachers in the head, killing one, armed with a .22 Remington Viper. He then fired at the assistant football coach but hit a 14-year-old freshman in the neck, killing her. Stephen Abbott was also charged with criminal responsibility for driving Rouse to school knowing he was armed and intended to shoot up his school.
December 8, 1995	Maida Vale, London, England, United Kingdom	Learco Chindamo, 15	1 dead		Headmaster Philip Lawrence was stabbed to death outside the gates of his school by 15-year-old Learco Chindamo at St George's Roman Catholic Secondary School in Maida Vale, London.
January 19, 1996	Washington, United States	Darrick Evans, 16, accomplice	1 dead		Winston Education Center, Two masked gunmen kill 14-year-old Damion Blocker in a stairwell. 16-year-old shooter Darrick Evans is given a sentence of 41 years to life in prison.
February 2, 1996	Moses Lake, Washington, United States	Barry Loukaitis, 14	3 dead	1 injured	Armed with a high-powered hunting rifle and two handguns, 14-year-old Barry Loukaitis killed his algebra teacher and two students before taking hostages. He also shot a girl in the arm, who he released during the hostage situation. The incident ended when a teacher burst into the room and tackled him.
February 8, 1996	Menlo Park, California, United States	Douglas Bradley, 16	1 dead	3 injured	16-year-old student Douglas Bradley drove his vehicle on the campus of Mid-Peninsula High School in Menlo Park, California, and fired at students with a .38-caliber revolver, hitting one in the leg with a bullet and causing injury to two others from shattered glass. Bradley then shot himself in the head, dying the next morning at Stanford University Medical Center.
March 25, 1996	Patterson, Missouri, United States	Anthony Gene Rutherford, 18, Jonathan Moore, 15, Joseph Burris, 15	1 dead		16-year-old student Will Futrelle was killed by an 18-year-old and two 15-year-old students at Mountain Park Baptist Academy, a rural Christian reform school.
April 11, 1996	Talladega, Alabama, United States	Steven L. Curry, 16	1 dead		16-year-old student Steven L. Curry fatally shot 18-year-old student Bobby Roberson Jr. in the parking lot of Talladega High School.
September 25, 1996	Scottdale, Georgia, United States	David Dubose Jr., 16	1 dead		David Dubose Jr. shot and killed 49-year-old English teacher Horace P. Morgan with a .38 caliber revolver in a corridor of DeKalb Alternative School. Dubose was then subdued by staff members.
January 27, 1997	West Palm Beach, Florida, United States	Tronneal Mangum, 13	1 dead		13-year-old Tronneal Mangum shot and killed another student, 14-year-old John Kamel, in front of Conniston Middle School. Mangum was reportedly upset that Kamel had failed to repay a $40 debt.
February 19, 1997	Bethel, Alaska, United States	Evan Ramsey, 16	2 dead	2 injured	1997 Bethel Regional High School shooting: Armed with a pump-action 12-gauge shotgun, Evan Ramsey killed a student and the principal of Bethel High School and wounded two others. He is now serving two 99-year prison sentences.
February 19, 1997	Webbers Falls, Oklahoma, United States	Marcus Ray Larsen, 15	1 dead		15-year-old Marcus Ray Larsen stabbed 18-year-old Joey Youngblood to death on school grounds as students were changing classes for the final hour of the school day. Larsen stabbed Youngblood in the chest three times after the two fought over a cigarette lighter that belonged to Larsen, according to reports.
March 30, 1997	Sana'a, Yemen	Mohammad Ahman al-Nazari, 48	6 dead	13 injured	Sana'a school shooting. Mohammad Ahman al-Nazari, 48, conducted a massacre at Tala'i Private School in the Asbahi township. Armed with an illegally obtained Kalashnikov assault rifle he waited for the headmistress and killed her by shooting her in the head. After killing a cafeteria worker and injuring a bus driver who came to help he entered the school building and walked from classroom to classroom, shooting indiscriminately at teachers and students. Subsequently, he went to nearby Musa Bin Nusayr School where he continued his rampage, that left a total of six people dead and 12 others wounded, before he himself was injured and arrested. al-Nazari was ultimately convicted of murder and was executed by firing squad just six days after the massacre.
April 28, 1997	Seabrook, New Jersey, United States	Peter Henriques, 16	1 dead		16-year-old student Nielsa Mason is beaten to death by fellow student Peter Henriques inside the boys’ locker room at Cumberland Regional High School.
May 5, 1997	Zöbern, Austria	Helmut Z., 15	1 dead	1 injured	15-year-old student Helmut Z. shot and killed a teacher at his school in Zöbern, after she intervened when he tried to rape a girl. He also shot and injured another teacher with the revolver he had stolen from his father, before trying to escape on his bike. Helmut was arrested and sentenced to eight years in prison.
May 16, 1997	Sacramento, California, United States	Alex Dale Thomas, 48	1 dead		18-year-old student Michelle Montoya was raped and stabbed to death by janitor and parolee Alex Dale Thomas after cornering her in the woodshop at Rio Linda High School. He was arrested shortly afterwards and sentenced to death for his crimes. Matters were further complicated by the announcement that Thomas was on parole for voluntary manslaughter and was hired due to a loophole which allowed non-educators to be hired as a substitute prior to a background check. This prompted legislator Deborah Ortiz to author a law requiring background checks for all school staff and prohibiting the hiring of felons, which passed in 1997.
October 1, 1997	Pearl, Mississippi, United States	Luke Woodham, 16	3 dead	7 injured	1997 Pearl High School shooting: Student 16-year-old Luke Woodham stabbed and beat his mother to death, then took a .30-.30 lever-action deer hunting rifle to Pearl High School where he shot into a crowd of students, killing his ex-girlfriend Christina Menefee and her friend Lydia Kay Dew and wounded seven other students. The incident was ended when Vice Principal Joel Myrick took his personal .45 Colt handgun out of his vehicle and brandished it at Woodham. Woodham later claimed that he did not remember killing his mother, Woodham is currently serving three life terms plus an additional 140 years in Mississippi State Penitentiary.
December 1, 1997	West Paducah, Kentucky, United States	Michael Carneal, 14	3 dead	5 injured	1997 Heath High School shooting: Michael Carneal, a 14-year-old freshman at Heath High School in West Paducah, Kentucky, opened fire on a prayer circle at his school killing three students and injuring five, Carneal is now serving a life sentence in Kentucky State Reformatory.
December 15, 1997	Stamps, Arkansas, United States	Joseph Todd, 14		2 injured	14-year-old Joseph Todd launched a sniper attack at his school that left two students wounded.
March 24, 1998	Jonesboro, Arkansas, United States	Mitchell Johnson, 13; Andrew Golden, 11	5 dead	10 injured	1998 Westside Middle School shooting: 13-year-old Mitchell Johnson and 11-year-old Andrew Golden set off the fire alarm in their Jonesboro school and then, from the woods, open fire on classmates and teachers as they flee the building. Four female students and a teacher are killed, with nine other students and a teacher being wounded in the incident, both men served jail sentences until they turned 21.
March 24, 1998	Wrocław, Poland	19-year-old Piotr P.		3 injured	A 19-year-old third-grade student, Piotr P., arrived at the Juliusz Słowacki IX General Secondary School. He first attacked a mathematics teacher with an axe, striking her in the face. When the axe became entangled in the teacher's sweater, Piotr ran out of the room, went one floor down, and attacked a physics teacher with a knife. He then attempted to attack a geography teacher, who hid behind a desk, and a further tragedy was prevented by another student who intervened. He served 5 1/2 years out of 8, that he was initially sentenced to. The reported motive was mental illness, specifically a personality disorder.
April 24, 1998	Edinboro, Pennsylvania, United States	Andrew Wurst, 14	1 dead	3 injured	1998 Parker Middle School dance shooting: 14-year-old Andrew J. Wurst went to the school graduation dance where he shot and killed a popular science teacher. He subsequently opened fire on more students, wounding another teacher and two classmates before he ran out of ammunition, he's now serving a 30 to 60-year sentence in a prison for young offenders.
May 19, 1998	Fayetteville, Tennessee, United States	Jacob Davis, 18	1 dead		Three days before graduation, 18-year-old Jacob Davis shoots and kills a 17-year-old student in the parking lot of his school after a dispute regarding his girlfriend.
May 21, 1998	Springfield, Oregon, United States	Kip Kinkel, 15	4 dead	25 injured	Kip Kinkel opened fire with a .22 rifle at Thurston Senior High School, killing two students and wounding 25 before being tackled by a wounded student. His parents were later found at home, murdered by Kinkel. He is now serving 111 years in prison without parole.
June 15, 1998	Richmond, Virginia, United States	14-year-old student		2 injured	A 14-year-old student of Armstrong High School wounded a teacher and a school volunteer.
January 8, 1999	Carrollton, Georgia, United States	Jeff Miller, 17	2 dead		17-year-old Jeff Miller fatally shot his girlfriend, 15-year-old Andrea Garrett, and then killed himself in a suicide pact at Central High School in Carrollton, Georgia.
February 11, 1999	Elgin, Illinois, United States	Rickey L. Quezada, 15	1 dead		A masked gunman shot and killed 14-year-old Hugo Rodriguez at the Ombudsman Education Services alternative education center. It was reported that police thought this shooting to be gang-related. Rickey L. Quezada was later arrested for the crime and convicted of first-degree murder.
February 18, 1999	Maunula, Finland	12-year-old male student		1 Injured	A sixth grader stabbed a male teacher to the shoulder at Maunula primary school. The motive was related to the Penkkarit tradition.
April 15, 1999	Eurajoki, Finland	15-year-old male student		1 injured	15-year-old male student stabbed a 16-year-old male student in the arm. According to the police the perpetrator had been bullied.
April 16, 1999	Notus, Idaho, United States	Shawn Cooper, 15		Some minor injuries	Shawn Cooper, 15, fired two shots from a 12 gauge shotgun, in the hall near the front desk at Notus Jr. Sr. High School. There were no serious injuries, but some students were close enough to the blast to catch some shrapnel from the tile floor. Shawn Cooper had been undergoing treatment for bipolar disorder.
April 20, 1999	Jefferson County, Colorado, United States	Eric Harris, 18 Dylan Klebold, 17	15 dead	24 injured	Columbine High School massacre. Two teenage students, Eric Harris—carrying a carbine rifle and a sawed-off pump-action shotgun—and Dylan Klebold—carrying a TEC-9 pistol and a sawed-off 12 gauge double-barreled shotgun—shot and killed 12 students and a teacher, and injured 21 other students and a teacher at Columbine High School. Two more students and a teacher were injured escaping. Ten of the 12 students killed were shot at nearly point-blank range while hiding under tables in the school library in seven minutes by the two shooters. Both were armed with numerous pipe bombs, napalm, knives, and other homemade explosives. Two propane time bombs (which only one partially detonated) were set in the school cafeteria. After their rampage, Harris and Klebold died of self-inflicted gunshot wounds to the head. Both are believed to have committed suicide simultaneously and both bodies were found in the back of the library together. Columbine High School is located in the Columbine CDP of Jefferson County, near the cities of Denver and Littleton. Harris and Klebold were both victims of bullying. Later, psychologists concluded that Harris was a psychopath and Klebold was an angry, suicidal depressive.
April 27, 1999	Vaasa, Finland	20-year-old male		1 injured	20-year-old male stabbed his 16-year-old ex-girlfriend in the neck with scissors at Borgaregatans Skola.
April 28, 1999	Taber, Alberta, Canada	Todd Cameron Smith, 14	1 dead	1 injured	W. R. Myers High School shooting. 14-year-old Todd Cameron Smith brought a sawn-off .22-caliber rifle to W.R Myers High School and shot two students, killing one, Cameron served a 3-year jail sentence and lived seven years on probation.
May 20, 1999	Conyers, Georgia, United States	T.J. Solomon, 15		6 injured	15-year-old T.J. Solomon, armed with a .22-caliber rifle and a handgun, opened fire at Heritage High School, wounding six students.
July 29, 1999	Soweto, South Africa	Charles Raboroko, 39	3 dead		Teacher Charles Raboroko shot and killed three of his colleagues in the staffroom at Anchor Comprehensive High School in Soweto. When he tried to escape he was hindered by angry students outside the school, whereupon he hid in a classroom, where he was later arrested by police. Raboroko was said to have borne a grudge against one of his victims, Henry Lebea, whom he killed with five shots in the head.
August 11, 1999	Sekinchan, Malaysia	Na Teck Ker, 42		6 injured	After he had been humiliated by friends, Na Teck Ker, a 42-year-old fisherman, bought a parang and headed for Sekolah Menengah Jenis Kebangsaan Yoke Kuan in Sekinchan, where he set his motorcycle ablaze, before chasing and randomly attacking students. When he was finally overpowered by teachers and passers-by he had already injured six pupils. Na Teck Ker was handed over to police and sentenced to 42 months in jail.
October 19, 1999	Longzhou County, China	Liang Yongcheng, 30	1 dead	7 injured	After spending the afternoon drinking, school guard Liang Yongcheng walked into a students' dormitory at a middle school in Longzhou county and threatened to kill everybody who tried to stop him. He eventually committed suicide, but not before shooting a teacher and six students with a hunting rifle.
October 20, 1999	Houston, Texas, United States	Estanislao Balderas, 14	1 dead		Estanislao Balderas stabbed a 13-year-old boy named Samuel Avila in the head with a screwdriver in a fight at Deady Middle School. Samuel Avila died. Balderas was arrested and prosecuted.
November 9, 1999	Meißen, Germany	Andreas S., 15	1 dead		A masked student, who was only identified as Andreas S., fatally stabbed teacher Sigrun Leuteritz 22 times with a kitchen knife in front of his classmates, before trying to escape. The student was later arrested and sentenced to 7 1/2 years in prison.
November 19, 1999	Deming, New Mexico, United States	Victor Cordova Jr., 12	1 dead		12-year-old Victor Cordova Jr. dressed in camouflage and shot 13-year-old Araceli Tena. Tena died a day later from sustained wounds in life support.
December 6, 1999	Fort Gibson, Oklahoma, United States	Seth Trickey, 13		4 injured	13-year-old Seth Trickey armed himself with a 9 mm semiautomatic handgun and opened fire of 15 rounds at Fort Gibson Middle School, injuring four classmates.
December 7, 1999	Veghel, Netherlands	Ali Düzgün, 17		5 injured	17-year-old Ali Düzgün, of Turkish Kurdish origin, shot and injured five people at a school. He claimed he wanted to avenge the family honour by shooting his sister's boyfriend, who he believed had brought the family honour to disgrace. The boyfriend, three other students and a teacher were injured in the shooting. Düzgün was sentenced to five years in prison, his father was sentenced to eight years.
December 17, 1999	Valparaíso, Chile	Iván Arancibia Navarro, 47	3 dead	1 injured	Valparaíso school shootings: Teacher Iván Arancibia Navarro shot three people dead (two higher-ups and his own daughter) before attempting to commit suicide by shooting. He was found not guilty by reason of insanity, institutionalized, and eventually committed suicide by asphyxiation after his release.

== See also ==
- List of attacks related to secondary schools (2000s)
- List of attacks related to secondary schools (2010s)
- List of attacks related to secondary schools (2020s)
- School bullying
- School shooting
- List of school-related attacks
- List of school shootings in the United States (before 2000)
- List of school shootings in the United States (2000–present)
- List of attacks related to primary schools
- List of attacks related to post-secondary schools
- List of rampage killers: School massacres
