= Morottaja =

Morottaja is an Inari Sámi surname that may refer to

- Matti Morottaja (born 1942), Inari Sámi writer, social activist and politician
- Amoc (rapper) (Mikkâl Antti Morottaja, born 1984), Inari Sámi musician, son of Matti
- Petter Morottaja (born 1982), Inari Sámi writer, son of Matti
