= Petter Morottaja =

Inari Sámi writer, linguist and teacher (born 1982)

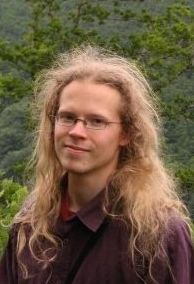
- Born: 11 July 1982; Inari, Finland
- Occupations: author, teacher

Petter Jori Andaras Morottaja (born 11 July 1982 in Inari, Finland) is a Finnish Inari Sámi author, journalist, and translator. He writes books in Inari Sámi. He published his first book at the age of 17. At the age of 25, he ran for the Sámi Parliament of Finland, but was not elected. Actively involved in the Inari Sámi Language Association, he has been named the editor-in-chief of the association's online newspaper Kierâš, which is published once a week. He also teaches Inari Sámi in numerous places, including the University of Helsinki. He is the son of Matti Morottaja and brother of Inari Sami rapper Amoc.

His debut book, Suábi maainâs, was the first fantasy novel to be published for young adults in Inari Sámi. His second book, published a year later, is a novel for children. Both books have been published by the Inari Sámi Language Association and illustrated by Martti Rikkonen.

== Works ==
- Suábi maainâs 1999.
- Riävskánieidâ 2000.
