= Matriculation exam (Finland) =

Finnish university entrance exam

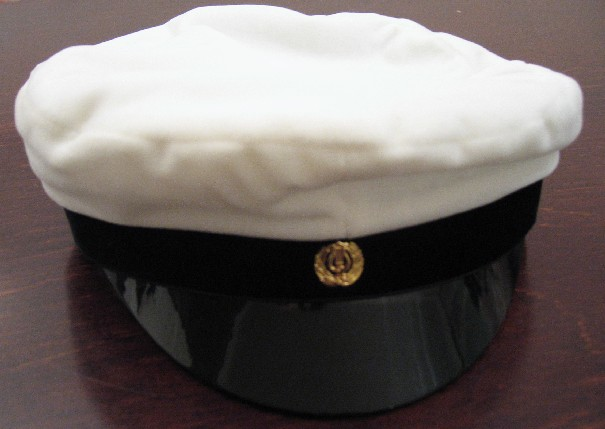
The traditional student cap worn in celebration by those who have completed the Finnish abitur

The Finnish Matriculation Examination (Finnish ylioppilastutkinto, Swedish studentexamen) is the matriculation examination taken at the end of secondary education to qualify for entry into university. In practice, the test also constitutes the high school's final exam(s), although there is a separate diploma on graduating from high school, based not on the exam, but on the grades of individual courses. Since 1919, the test has been arranged by a national body, the Matriculation Examination Board. Before that, the administration of the test was the responsibility of the University of Helsinki.

Under a previous law, successful completion entitled one to enroll as a university student, initially without the need for an entrance exam (hence "matriculation"). Although the legal requirement has been lifted, matriculation without completing the test is still an exception. The universities are now free to arrange their own entrance examinations in addition to considering scores from the matriculation examination. Thus, universities accept students based on the entrance exam points, the matriculation exam points, a combined score of these two, and possibly other merits. Successfully passing the test entitles one to wear the Finnish student cap.

== Exams ==
Each examinee used to be required to participate in at least four tests in order to pass the exam, however, legislation changed effective from March 15, 2022 pass the minimum at 5 subjects. As of 2005, the only mandatory part of the test is that of äidinkieli/modersmål ("mother tongue"; Finnish for most students, Swedish, Northern Sámi, Inari Sámi, or Skolt Sámi for some), including a composition test. Students whose mother tongue is not Finnish, Swedish, Sami or sign language, can take the Finnish or Swedish as second language test instead. The student then has to choose four other subjects from:

- Second domestic language: (Swedish for Finnish speakers or Finnish for Swedish speakers)
- Foreign language: Languages are separated into A and B levels depending on the demanded skill. The language counted as part of the four obligatory subjects must be one of A-level. Students can take an advanced level exam despite having taken intermediate or beginner-level courses on the subject, or vice versa. English, German and French are the most popular choices among students, but in addition, the students may take Russian, Italian, Spanish, Portuguese, Latin, Inari Sámi, and Northern Sámi exams. The foreign language exams include listening and reading comprehension tests, a grammar test and an essay.
- Mathematics: (ordinary or advanced level), including 15 assignments 10 of which must be completed.
- Reaali (realämnen in Swedish): Here the examinees take exams in individual subjects and are only allowed to answer questions from a single subject per exam. There is no limitation in the number of individual exams taken, but as tests in multiple subjects are held at the same time, it is practically possible to attend two exams two times per year. The subjects taken by the examinee have to be chosen well in advance prior to the exam. Exams consist of questions which require answers in the form of a multiple-choice test, essay and/or mathematical treatment. Historically, prior to 2005, all subjects in this category were tested in a single exam, in which the examinee freely chose to answer up to 10 out of up to 60 questions available, constituting a common question pool divided among the subjects such that the amount of questions in each subject was determined by the breadth of its curriculum (initially, until 1932, the amount of answers was unlimited). The subjects in the reaali category are
  - Religion, Evangelical Lutheran
  - Religion, Orthodox Christian
  - Education on ethics and moral history
  - Philosophy
  - Psychology
  - History
  - Civics
  - Physics
  - Chemistry
  - Biology
  - Geography
  - Health education

The emblem of the Finnish Matriculation Examination Board

The exam takes place at schools according to minute regulations laid out by the national board. Each exam takes six hours. After the exam, the teachers grade the papers and send the graded papers to the national board which then re-grades every paper. The grading of the exam may be appealed against. In this case, the board re-examines the grading. The result of the re-examination is final and cannot be appealed to any authority.

== Scoring ==
The score of each test varies with the subject. For example, the maximum score for the test in Finnish or Swedish as a first language is 120 points, in mathematics 120 points and in foreign languages 299 points. The tests are graded according to normal distribution into seven verbal grades with Latin names: improbatur (I), approbatur (A), lubenter approbatur (B), cum laude approbatur (C), magna cum laude approbatur (M), eximia cum laude approbatur (E) and laudatur (L), from bottom to top. (A rough literal translation of the grades is "not approved", "approved", "gladly approved", "approved with praise", "approved with much praise", "approved with exceptional praise", and "praised"/"lauded".) In general, at least the grade A is required for the test to be passed. The grades received by the students generally follow a distribution of:

- 5% of students receive a laudatur (L)
- 15% of students receive an eximia cum laude approbatur (E)
- 20% of students receive a magna cum laude approbatur (M)
- 20% of students receive a cum laude approbatur (C)
- 20% of students receive a lubenter approbatur (B)
- 15% of students receive an approbatur (A)
- 5% of students receive an improbatur (I).

This distribution is such that one grade on the scale is equivalent to approximately one standard deviation; 64% are within M-B and 90% within E-A.

Traditionally, the test is taken in the spring, but it is also arranged every autumn and may be taken in up to three parts. Thus completing the matriculation exam may take up to one and a half years. Usually, the last set of exams is taken at the end of the third year in upper secondary school. The exams take place in late March, but for the school-leavers, the school ends in mid-February, giving the students ample time to prepare for the test in solitary study. This occasion is celebrated by the traditional festivity of penkkarit.

== Compensation system ==
Students who receive an improbatur in any of the obligatory exams fail the entire exam. However, a single failed obligatory exam may be compensated for by good results in other exams. Based on the compensation system, the total exam score of the student is calculated and compared with the result of the failed test. To receive their diploma, a student must accumulate sufficient compensation points from the other exams. The improbatur is divided into four classes (i+, i, i−, i=), each describing the degree of a student's failure (i+ is the least failure), and each class has its own number of compensation points needed for an acceptable result (12, 14, 16 and 18 respectively). Points from accepted exams are awarded as follows: L, seven points; E, six; M, five; C, four; B, three and A, two.

== Digitalisation ==
The Matriculation Examination went through a process of digitalisation. The first digital tests were held in the autumn of 2016 in geography, philosophy and German language. The last test to become digital was the mathematics test in spring 2019. From then on traditional paper tests will no longer be organised. The new digital system worth 3-5 million euros is being built by Finnish tech company Reaktor.

== See also ==
- Education in Finland
- Matura
