= Inari Sámi =

Inari Sámi may refer to:

- Inari Sámi language
- Inari Sámi people
