= Matti Morottaja =

Finnish Sámi author and politician

Matti Heikki Ilmari Morottaja or Kuobž-Saammâl Matti, (b. 28 December 1942 in Sammuttijärvi, Finland) is an Inari Sámi author, teacher and member of the Sami Parliament of Finland, serving as president for six years. He has served as president of the Inari Sámi Language Association since its foundation. His sons, Petter and Mikkâl, have also promoted the use of Inari Sámi in their own way: Petter as the editor-in-chief of Kierâš, a digital weekly in Inari Sámi and Mikkâl as the first rapper to rap in Inari Sámi in the world. Morottaja received the Mikael Agricola Prize from the Finnish Cultural Foundation on 1 April 2007.

== Works ==
In 1996, Matti Morottaja was the editor for a book called Tovlááh mainâseh, which contains stories and tales from the publications Anarâš and Sábmelaš, from audiotapes made between 1968 and 1970 and from the anthology Aanaarkiela čájttuzeh.

Together with Ilmari Mattus, Morottaja has served as editor for the short-story anthology called Kyelisieidi maccâm já eres novelleh, which was published at Christmas 2005.

=== Translations ===
- Nieidâ kote šoodâi kollekuálsin (a translation of Samuli Aikio's book Nieida guhte šaddai gollegoalsin, originally in Northern Sámi) 1982
- Rauna Paadar-Leivo's book Halstemjeegi noaidi 1990
- Kirsti Paltto's book Tivgâ (Divgá) 1994
- Veikko Holmberg's book Tuuru-kuobžâ 1995
