= 1994 Wickliffe Middle School shooting =

Mass shooting in Ohio, U.S.

Coordinates: 41°36′18″N 81°28′26″W

- Location: Wickliffe Middle School, Wickliffe, Ohio, U.S.
- Date: November 7, 1994
- Attack type: Mass shooting, school shooting, murder
- Weapon: 12-gauge single-shot shotgun
- Deaths: 1
- Injuries: 4 (including the perpetrator)
- Perpetrator: Keith A. Ledeger

The Wickliffe Middle School shooting was a school shooting that occurred on November 7, 1994, at Wickliffe Middle School in Wickliffe, Ohio, United States. The gunman, 37-year-old Keith A. Ledeger, was a former student at Wickliffe Middle School.

== Events ==
Ledeger, armed with a 12-gauge single-shot shotgun and 25 shotgun shells, entered the school at 2:10 pm. He walked into the school's administrative offices, located just off the front entrance, and asked to speak with the principal or assistant principal. Principal James Anderson spotted his weapon and scrambled for cover inside a coworker's office. Ledeger followed Anderson, who had locked himself inside, and fired several shots through the door. Anderson was wounded but managed to escape out an open window, where he was spotted by Wickliffe policeman Thomas Schmidt. Schmidt immediately moved to assist Anderson around the same time three other officers entered the school through the north and east doors.

Ledeger then left the office and walked towards the computer lab, where custodian Peter Christopher, an amateur computer hobbyist, had been assisting a teacher with tech issues. Ledeger pointed his weapon at an 11-year-old girl standing next to Christopher, who Christopher then pushed into the lab and stood in front of the door. The custodian implored Ledeger to drop his weapon, but Ledeger refused and shot Pete Christopher twice, killing him instantly. Christopher's sacrifice would later be honored by shopwork students, who crafted a memorial wooden bench with a plaque commemorating Christopher, which to this day features prominently in the middle school's administrative offices.

Ledeger was next seen outside the boys locker room, where shop teacher Lowell Grimm was helping students hide. Grimm shoved a student in the locker room then tried to run, but was shot three times. He stumbled out a rear door to the school's recreational yard, where he collapsed. He would survive his injuries.

By this time, Wickliffe police officer Leonard Nosse had entered through the east side of the building. Nosse encountered Ledeger in the hallway outside the boys locker room. A gun battle ensued, and officer Thomas Schmidt was wounded when he inadvertently came across Ledeger. Ledeger attempted to finish off Schmidt, but was incapacitated by gunfire from Nosse. Nosse was given the Jorge Medina Award for his bravery in stopping the perpetrator from causing further damage.

The attack lasted 3 minutes and 34 seconds, during which Ledeger discharged his shotgun 10 times before being shot 3 times by Nosse. When asked by arresting officers why he was there, Ledeger replied "Revenge, sir."

Ledeger was sentenced to 57 years in prison, and died from natural causes on December 24, 2011, while serving his sentence.

Ledeger was an alcoholic at the time of the shooting and had a history of mental health issues. He was seen walking into the school by a construction crew doing work on a nearby bank. They managed to call 911 before he entered the school which greatly reduced the number of casualties.

== See also ==
- List of school shootings in the United States
