= Kierâš =

Kierâš was an Inari Sámi-language online weekly newspaper that was published for the first time on September 6, 2007. It was published by Anarâškielâ servi and its editor-in-chief was Petter Morottaja. At the start, the newspaper was published once a week, offering news, announcements and current topics in Inari Sámi to its readers. The Society for the Promotion of Sámi Culture donated money to cover the costs of running the magazine before the society disbanded in 2007. The Cultural Division of the Sámi Parliament in Finland awarded the newspaper a publication grant for 2008. Kierâš was published for the last time in 2011.

According to the editor-in-chief, the weekly had a circulation of 65.
