= Attack on St Alberts School =

- Part of Rhodesian Bush War
- Type: Kidnapping
- Planned by: Unknown
- Target: St Alberts School
- Date: July 1973
- Executed by: ZANLA
- Outcome: 284 students and staff rescued, 8 students and teachers remained in cadres hands.
- Casualties: Unknown killed

In July 1973, an attack was carried out on St Alberts School, a Catholic mission high school in Mashonaland Central in Rhodesia overlooking the Zambezi valley in east of the country close to the border with Mozambique. The attack was carried out by ZANLA as part of the Rhodesian Bush War.

== Background ==
St Alberts High School was a coeducational Catholic mission high school that also provided boarding for students. It was situated in the Mashonaland Central area of Rhodesia, on the escarpment overlooking the Zambezi Valley in northern Zimbabwe near the Mozambique border. It is above this escarpment which is also popularly known as the Mavhuradonha Mountain range. The valley below is also known as Dande. St. Alberts is located in between Mount Darwin and Centenary, in a region of temperate weather.

== The attack ==
In July 1973, Zimbabwe African National Liberation Army (ZANLA) cadres captured 292 pupils and staff from the school and force-marched them north towards Mozambique, where the ZANLA bases were. The march was intercepted by the Rhodesian Security Forces before the cadres crossed the border, and all but eight of the children and staff were recovered.

Similar abductions were repeated over the following years and the security forces found themselves increasingly unable to prevent them. The captured schoolchildren would be marched to ZANLA bases in Mozambique where they would undergo "political 're-education'" (in the words of Abbott and Botham) and guerrilla training. The school was closed in the late 1970s by the Rhodesian government at the height of the Rhodesian Bush War, as they had claimed it had become a haven for the recruitment of communists.
