= Inari Sámi language =

Endangered Uralic language of Finland

Inari Sámi
- anarâškielâ aanaarsämikielâ
- Native to: Finland
- Ethnicity: Inari Sámi people
- Native speakers: 400 (2018 census)
- Language family: Uralic: Sámi; Eastern; Inari Sámi
- Writing system: Latin

Official status
- Recognised minority language in: Finland

Language codes
- ISO 639-2: smn
- ISO 639-3: smn
- Glottolog: inar1241
- ELP: Inari Saami
- Inari Sami language area (red) within Sápmi (grey)

- Inari Saami is classified as Severely Endangered by the UNESCO Atlas of the World's Languages in Danger

Inari Sámi (Inari Sami: anarâškielâ, lit. 'the Inarian language' or aanaarsämikielâ, 'the Inari (Aanaar) Sámi language') is a Sámi language spoken by the Inari Sámi of Finland. As of 2018, Inari Sámi has approximately 400 speakers, the majority of whom are middle-aged or older and live in the municipality of Inari. According to the Sámi Parliament of Finland, 269 persons used Inari Sámi as their first language. It is the only Sámi language that is spoken exclusively in Finland. The language is classified as being seriously endangered, as few children learn it; however, more and more children are learning it in language nests.

== History ==
Inari Sámi is one of three Sámi languages spoken in Finland; the other two are Northern Sámi and Skolt Sámi, which are endangered languages as well. There may be as many as nine Sámi languages. The traditional Sámi homeland, Sápmi, encompasses the northern regions of Norway, Sweden, Finland, and parts of Russia. Sámi is the only officially recognized indigenous group in the European Union.

=== Language decline ===
From the 13th to early 19th century, Finland was under Swedish rule. Sweden imposed conversion to Christianity on the Sámi, marking the beginning of Inari Sámi's decrease in use.

The Lapp Codicil of 1751 created a legal protection for Sámi as a part of the Strömstad Treaty. This addendum stated that Sámi would be allowed to move across the border freely in order to follow reindeer migration since reindeer husbandry is part of traditional Sámi culture. Over the next century, northern Scandinavian borders became less open to the Sámi, with Norway closing the border to them completely in 1852. Further constriction of the reindeer migratory range meant more Sámi had to leave Sápmi in order to find work, moving to areas like Helsinki and learning Finnish. Over half of the modern Sámi population now lives outside of Sápmi.

By the start of the 20th century, Finland introduced compulsory education policies for the Sámi. Sámi languages like Inari Sámi were targeted and discouraged, with students encouraged to assimilate into Finnish language and culture.

The evacuation of Lapland during the Lapland War of World War II meant that Sámi populations in northern Finland were relocated to central Finland and Sweden. Nearly every building was destroyed by retreating German forces, and many Sámi homes — as well as artifacts and important historical sites — were lost.

=== Modern Inari Sámi ===
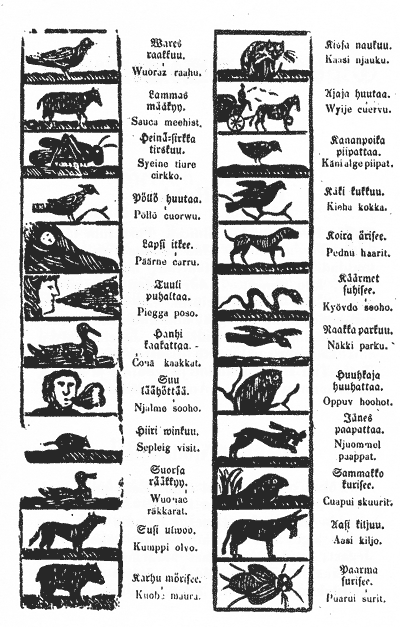
Edvard Wilhelm Borg's Anar sämi kiela aapis kirje ja doctor Martti Lutherus Ucca katkismus

The first book in Inari Sámi was Anar sämi kiela aapis kirje ja doctor Martti Lutherus Ucca katkismus, which was written and translated by Edvard Wilhelm Borg in 1859. The written history of modern Inari Sámi, however, is said to begin with Lauri Arvid Itkonen's translation of the history of the Bible in 1906, although he had already translated some other books into Inari Sámi (Martin Luther and John Charles Ryles). After that, Inari Sámi was mainly published in books written by linguists, in particular Frans Äimä and Erkki Itkonen. For many years, very little literature was written in Inari Sámi, although Sämitigge has funded and published a lot of books, etc., in recent years.

The destruction of important historical items during World War II prompted the formation of the Siida Museum in Inari in 1963. "Siida" means "the place," and the museum aims to preserve Sámi history and the Inari Sámi language.

When the Sámi people came back from evacuation, they realized that a lot of their history was lost. We needed a place to store what we had left and recover items that had traveled beyond Sápmi's borders to bring them back home and preserve them for future generations.

— Taija Aikio, Siida spokesperson, National Geographic

Since 1992, Finland's Sámi have had the right to interact with officials in their own language in areas where they have traditionally lived: Enontekiö, Utsjoki, Inari and the northern part of Sodankylä as official policy favors the conservation of the language. All announcements in Inari, which is the only officially quadrilingual municipality in Finland, must be made in Finnish, North Sámi, Inari Sámi and Skolt Sámi. Only about 10% of the public servants in the area, however, can serve the Inari Sámi-speaking population in Inari Sámi, so Finnish is used by the remaining 90%.

=== Anarâškielâ servi and language preservation ===
The Anarâškielâ servi (Inari Sámi Language Association) was founded in 1986 to promote the language and its use; that year, there were only four children who spoke Inari Sámi, two of which were taught by their parents Matti Morottaja and Ilmari Mattus who founded the association.

The association publishes numerous books, textbooks, a calendar, etc., in Inari Sámi. They established a language immersion program in 1997 for 3- to 6-year-old children in a day care in Inari and Ivalo. The language nest model was inspired by a similar program used to preserve the Māori language in New Zealand. Its first nest produced about 40 new Inari Sámi speakers over the next decade, but it faced initial expansion issues because the program only had two teachers.

In 2007, the association started publishing an Inari Sámi newspaper called Kierâš online, with Morottaja's son Petter serving as editor-in-chief. Morottaja's other son Mikkâl, whose stage name is Amoc, uses Inari Sámi in rap songs. Amoc published the first full-length Inari Sámi rap CD in the world on Sámi National Day in 2007.

Linguist Marja-Liisa Olthuis became the first person to use Inari Sámi to defend a doctoral thesis in April 2007 from the University of Oulu. Olthuis then created the Complementary Aanaar Saami Language Education (CASLE) program, teaching nonnative adult speakers the Inari Sámi language. CASLE participants learned how to teach the language and use it on an everyday basis — they then became teachers for new language nests, allowing the Anarâškielâ servi program to expand.

One of Olthuis's students, Italian-born Fabrizio Brecciaroli, began overseeing Anarâškielâ servi's publications in 2019. The Inari Sámi version of Wikipedia launched in 2020 and expansion is led by Brecciaroli and Anarâškielâ servi. As of 2025, it has over 6,000 articles. In 2023, Anarâš Aavis, the only daily newspaper written in Inari Sámi, was founded; Brecciaroli currently serves as editor.

Olthuis said in 2025 that she estimated Inari Sámi had about 500 total speakers as a result of language revival efforts.

We've seen a reversal of sorts. Until not long ago we didn't have speakers; now we even have foreigners coming to us to learn. I like working with these language learners. I value every person who learns the language and works with it.

— Marja-Liisa Olthuis, National Geographic

== Geographic distribution ==
Along with Finnish, Skolt Sámi and Northern Sámi, Inari Sámi is one of the four official languages in the municipality of Inari, in particular in the following villages located on the shore of Lake Inari (the Inari Sámi name for the village is enclosed in parentheses):

- Aksujärvi (Ákšujävri)
- Iijärvi (Ijjävri)
- Inari (Aanaar)
- Ivalo (Avveel)
- Kaamanen (Kaamâs)
- Menesjärvi (Menišjävri)
- Nellim (Njellim)
- Partakko (Päärtih)
- Repojoki (Riemâšjuuhâ)
- Sevettijärvi (Čevetjävri)
- Syysjärvi (Čovčjävri)
- Tirro (Mosshâš)

== Phonology ==
=== Consonants ===
Inari Sámi consonants
		Labial	Dental	Alveolar	Postalveolar	Palatal	Velar
Nasal		m	n			ɲ	ŋ
Plosive / Affricate	voiceless	p	t	t͡s	t͡ʃ		k
Plosive / Affricate	voiced	b	d	d͡z	d͡ʒ		ɡ
Fricative	voiceless	f		s	ʃ		h
Fricative	voiced	v	ð				
Approximant	median	v				j	
Approximant	lateral			l			
Trill				r			

=== Vowels ===
	Front	Central	Back
Close	i y		u
Mid	e	ə	o
Open	æ	(ä)	ɑ

Notes:

- The central open vowel /ä/ was distinguished only in older Inari Sámi. In the modern language, it has merged into the front vowel /æ/.

=== Prosody ===
Inari Sámi, like the other Samic languages, has fixed word-initial stress. Words are furthermore divided into feet, usually consisting of two syllables each, and with secondary stress on the first syllable of every foot. In the other Samic languages the last syllable in a word with an odd number of syllables is not assigned to a foot. In Inari Sámi, however, two important changes in the early development of Inari Sámi have changed this structure, making the prosodic rhythm quite different:

1. In words with an odd number of syllables, the last two syllables were converted into a foot, leaving the third-last syllable as a foot of its own.
2. The apocope of certain final vowels, in words of three syllables or more, reduced this new final foot to a single syllable.

Consequently, Inari Sámi distinguishes prosodically between words that originally ended in a vowel but have undergone apocope, and words that already ended in a consonant in Proto-Samic.

This rearrangement of the foot structure has an effect on the length of vowels and consonants.

== Orthography ==
Inari Sámi is written using the Latin script. The alphabet currently used for Inari Sámi was made official in 1996 and stands as follows:

A a /ɑ/	Á á /a/	Ä ä /æ/	Â â /ə/	B b /b/	C c /t͡s/	Č č /t͡ʃ/	D d /d/
Đ đ /ð/	E e /e/	F f /f/	G g /ɡ/	H h /h/	I i /i/, /j/	J j /j/	K k /k/
L l /l/	M m /m/	N n /n/	Ŋ ŋ /ŋ/	O o /o/	P p /p/	R r /r/	S s /s/
Š š /ʃ/	T t /t/	U u /u/	V v /v/	Y y /y/	Z z /d͡z/	Ž ž /d͡ʒ/

As in Karelian but not Northern Sámi, b, d, and g represent true voiced stops, while p, t, and k represent voiceless unaspirated stops. However, the letters č, đ, ŋ, š, z, and ž have the same values as in Northern Sámi. Q/q, W/w, X/x, Å/å, Ö/ö are also used in words of foreign origin. Á was traditionally pronounced in the middle of a and ä, but in modern Inari Sámi the distinction between á and ä is nonexistent. In writing, Á and ä are nevertheless considered separate characters. Ä is used in:

- the first syllable of a word, when there is an e or i in a second syllable of the same word,
- a word of only one syllable (although á is also used), or
- the diphthong iä (but not in the diphthong uá).

=== Marks used in reference works ===
In dictionaries, grammars and other linguistic works, the following additional marks are used. These are not used in normal writing.

- A dot is placed below consonants to indicate a half-long consonant: đ̣, j̣, ḷ, ṃ, ṇ, ṇj, ŋ̣, ṛ, ṿ. Some works may instead print the letter in bold, or use a capital letter.
- A vertical line ˈ (U+02C8 MODIFIER LETTER VERTICAL LINE), typewriter apostrophe or other similar mark is placed between consonants to indicate that the preceding consonant is long, and the preceding diphthong is short. It is only used when a diphthong precedes.
- The same mark placed between a diphthong and a consonant indicates that the diphthong is short.
- The same mark placed between a single vowel and a consonant indicates that the vowel is half-long.

== Grammar ==
=== Consonant gradation ===
Consonant gradation is a pattern of alternations between pairs of consonants that appears in the inflection of words. Consonant gradation in Inari Sámi is more complex than that of other Sámi languages, because of the effects of the unique stress pattern of Inari Sámi. Like in other Sámi languages, there is a distinction between the strong and weak grade, but a second factor is whether the consonants appear in the middle of a foot (FM) or in the juncture between two feet (FJ). In the latter case, consonants are often lengthened.

Q3	Q2		Q1
Q3	FM	FJ	Q1
đđ	đ̣	đđ	đ
jj	j̣	jj	j
ll	ḷ	ll	l
mm	ṃ	mm	m
nn	ṇ	nn	n
rr	ṛ	rr	r
vv	ṿ	vv	v

Q3	Q2		Q1	
Q3	FM	FJ	FM	FJ
cc	c	cc	s	
čč	č	čč	j̣	jj
kk	h	h/hh	ṿ	vv
pp	p	pp	v	
ss	s	ss	s	
šš	š	šš	š	
tt	t	tt	đ	

=== Umlaut ===
Umlaut is a phenomenon in Inari Sámi, whereby the vowel in the second syllable affects the quality of the vowel in the first.

The following table lists the Inari Sámi outcomes of the Proto-Samic first-syllable vowel, for each second-syllable vowel.

Proto	*ā, *ō	*ē	*ë, *i, *u
Inari	á, o/u	e/i	â/a, i, u
*ë	a		o
*o	o		u
*i	i		
*u	u		
*ā	á	ä	a
*ea	iä	e	
*ie	iä	ie	
*oa	uá		o
*uo	uá	ye	uo

As can be seen, several of the Proto-Samic vowels have identical outcomes before certain second-syllable vowels. Only before Proto-Samic *ē are all vowels distinguishable. For example, Proto-Samic *oa and *ë both appear before *ë as o, while *o and *u both appear as u. In cases where the second-syllable vowel changes, it is necessary to know which series the vowel of a particular word belongs to. For example, juuḥâđ "to drink" has the third-person singular present indicative form juhá, while nuuḥâđ "to end" has nohá; the former originates from Proto-Samic *u, the latter from *o.

A second kind of umlaut also occurs, which operates in reverse: when the first syllable contains a (originating from Proto-Samic *ë) and the second syllable contains á, the second-syllable vowel is backed to a. Thus, the third-person singular present indicative form of moonnâđ "to go" is maṇa (rather than *maṇá), and the illative singular of ahe "age" is ahan (rather than *ahán).

=== Nouns ===
Inari Sámi has nine cases, although the genitive and accusative are often the same:

- Nominative
- Genitive
- Accusative
- Locative
- Illative
- Comitative
- Abessive
- Essive
- Partitive

The partitive appears to be a highly unproductive case in that it seems to only be used in the singular. In addition, unlike Finnish, Inari Sámi does not make use of the partitive case for objects of transitive verbs. Thus "Mun puurâm leeibi" could translate into Finnish as either "Minä syön leivän" (English: "I'm eating (all of) the bread") or "Minä syön leipää" (I'm eating (some) bread, or generally, I eat bread); this telicity contrast is mandatory in Finnish.

=== Pronouns ===
The personal pronouns have three numbers: singular, plural and dual. The following table contains personal pronouns in the nominative and genitive/accusative cases.

	singular		dual		plural	
	nominative	genitive	nominative	genitive	nominative	genitive
1st person	mun	muu	muoi	munnuu	mij	mii
2nd person	tun	tuu	tuoi	tunnuu	tij	tii
3rd person	sun	suu	suoi	sunnuu	sij	sii

The next table demonstrates the declension of a personal pronoun I/we (dual)/we (plural) in the various cases:

	Singular	Dual	Plural
Nominative	mun	muoi	mij
Genitive-Accusative	muu	munnuu	mii
Locative	must, muste	munnust	mist, miste
Illative	munjin	munnui	mijjân
Comitative	muuin, muin	munnuin, munnuuin	miiguim
Abessive	muuttáá	munnuuttáá	miittáá
Essive	munen	munnun	minen
Partitive	muđe	---	---

=== Verbs ===
==== Person ====
Inari Sámi verbs conjugate for three grammatical persons:

- first person
- second person
- third person

==== Mood ====
Inari Sámi has five grammatical moods:

- indicative
- imperative
- conditional
- potential
- optative

==== Grammatical number ====
Inari Sámi verbs conjugate for three grammatical numbers:

- singular
- dual
- plural

==== Tense ====
Inari Sámi has two simple tenses:

- past
- non-past

and two compound tenses:

- perfect
- Pluperfect

==== Negative verb ====
Inari Sámi, like Finnish and the other Sámi languages, has a negative verb. In Inari Sámi, the negative verb conjugates according to mood (indicative, imperative and optative), person (1st, 2nd, 3rd) and number (singular, dual and plural).

Ind. pres.				Imperative				Optative			
	sg.	du	pl.		sg.	du	pl.		sg.	du	pl.
1	jiem	iän	ep	1	–	–		1	iällum	iälloon	iällup
2	jieh	eppee	eppeđ	2	ele	ellee	elleđ	2	ele	ellee	elleđ
3	ij	iävá	iä	3	–	–	–	3	iälus	iällus	iällus
