= Anarâškielâ servi =

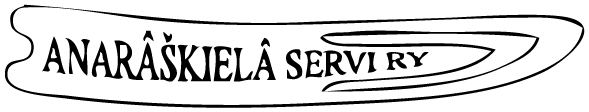
Logo of Anarâškielâ servi

Anarâškielâ servi (Inari Sámi Language Association) is a Sámi association from Inari, Finland. The association was founded in the auditorium of the Ivalo Hotel in Ivalo on December 4, 1986, by Veikko Aikio, Ilmari Mattus, and Matti Morottaja. Morottaja was chosen to be the association's first president.

The goal of the association is to promote Inari Sámi and its use. In 1997, the association established an Inari-Sámi language immersion program called Kielâpiervâl for 3-6-year-old children in a day care in Inari and Ivalo. The language-immersion program has been key in increasing the number of Inari Sámi speakers, especially amongst children and young adults. The association also publishes a number of books, textbooks, a calendar, films, music, etc. In addition, it puts out two Inari Sámi publications: the member bulletin Anarâš and the on-line Kierâš newspaper.

The association received the Gollegiella Award on November 17, 2004.
