= Merja Aletta Ranttila =

Finnish Sámi visual artist

Merja Aletta Ranttila (b. 23 May 1960, Utsjoki, Finland) is a well-known Finnish Sámi visual artist, illustrator, and printmaker. Ranttila has made Sami culture known in various exhibitions in Finland and abroad.

== Early life and education ==
Ranttila spent her childhood in Lemmenjoki. She has a mountain Sámi background, and Northern Sámi is her mother tongue.

Ranttila studied at Lapland Art School from 1980 to 1982 and Rovaniemi Art and Craft School from 1982 to 1986.

== Career ==
At the beginning of her career, Ranttila made illustrations for textbooks and fairy tales, and collections of short stories and novels. Her first illustration work was the 600 pictures of Davvi's textbook, which she did in 1980. She has also drawn postcards. Ranttilla was specially commissioned for Sámi subjects. In the early 1990s, she introduced the linocut technique.

In January 2012, Finnish national post service Posti published stickers illustrated by Ranttila.

Ranttila became widely publicized in 1993 when priests interpreted her works as "shamanism and satanism". It was the Shamaani summer held at Tornio's Aine art museum.

Ranttila participated in the Madrid art fair in 1995.

In 2001, Ranttila participated in a joint exhibition of Finnish artists in Australia.

In the fall of 2002, Ranttila spent a month at the artist residency of the Finnish-African cultural center Villa Karo in Berlin. As a result, together with her sister, textile artist Seija Ranttila, Ranttila held an African-inspired exhibition in Oulu.

In 2015, Ranttila participated in a joint exhibition of Northern Finnish artists. Around the time of the Finland 100 theme, she held an exhibition in Paris. She has been designing ice sculptures.

Ranttila has also worked as a gallerist.

== Style ==
Ranttila's art has been classified as shamanistic expressionism. Her art has also been considered feminist art. Ranttila is classified as belonging to the second generation of Sámi visual artists.

Ranttila said she felt the need to release the traumas of his childhood in a Lestadio environment. The works take a stand on the awkward and locked-in position of women in the world of fishing. Her works are known for their symbolism, dreaminess, often recurring devil and female characters, and references to dramatic news events of the time the works were created. She has described her personal crises in her works. There are often animals in the pictures.

== Private life ==
Ranttila has a son. She has experienced domestic violence. She lost her son's father in a car accident in 1992. Ranttila has suffered from alcoholism.

== Scholarships ==
- 2005 - grant from The Sámi Council's cultural committee.
- 2007 - grant from The Central Art Committee.
- 2016 - grant of 12,000 Euros for artistic work from the Lapland Fund of the Finnish Cultural Fund.
- 2017 - grant of 5,000 euros from the Art Promotion Center (Taike) for exhibition costs.

== Awards ==
- 1993 - State prize for children's culture
- 1994 - Urpo and Maija Lahtinen Foundation Art Award
- 2000 - Culture award of the Sámi assemblies
- 2014 - Pohjola Osuuspankki Pearl Award
