= Syysjärvi =

Lake in Finland

- Location within Finland
- Location: Juva
- Coordinates: 61.721°N 27.595°E
- Type: Lake
- Primary outflows: Inkilänkoski
- Catchment area: Vuoksi
- Basin countries: Finland
- Surface area: 10.933 km^{2} (4.221 sq mi)
- Average depth: 7.1 m (23 ft)
- Max. depth: 27 m (89 ft)
- Water volume: 0.0776 km^{3} (62,900 acre⋅ft)
- Shore length^{1}: 76.21 km (47.35 mi)
- Surface elevation: 86.4 m (283 ft)
- Frozen: December–April
- Islands: Huhtisaari
- Settlements: Juva
- ^{1} Shore length is not a well-defined measure.

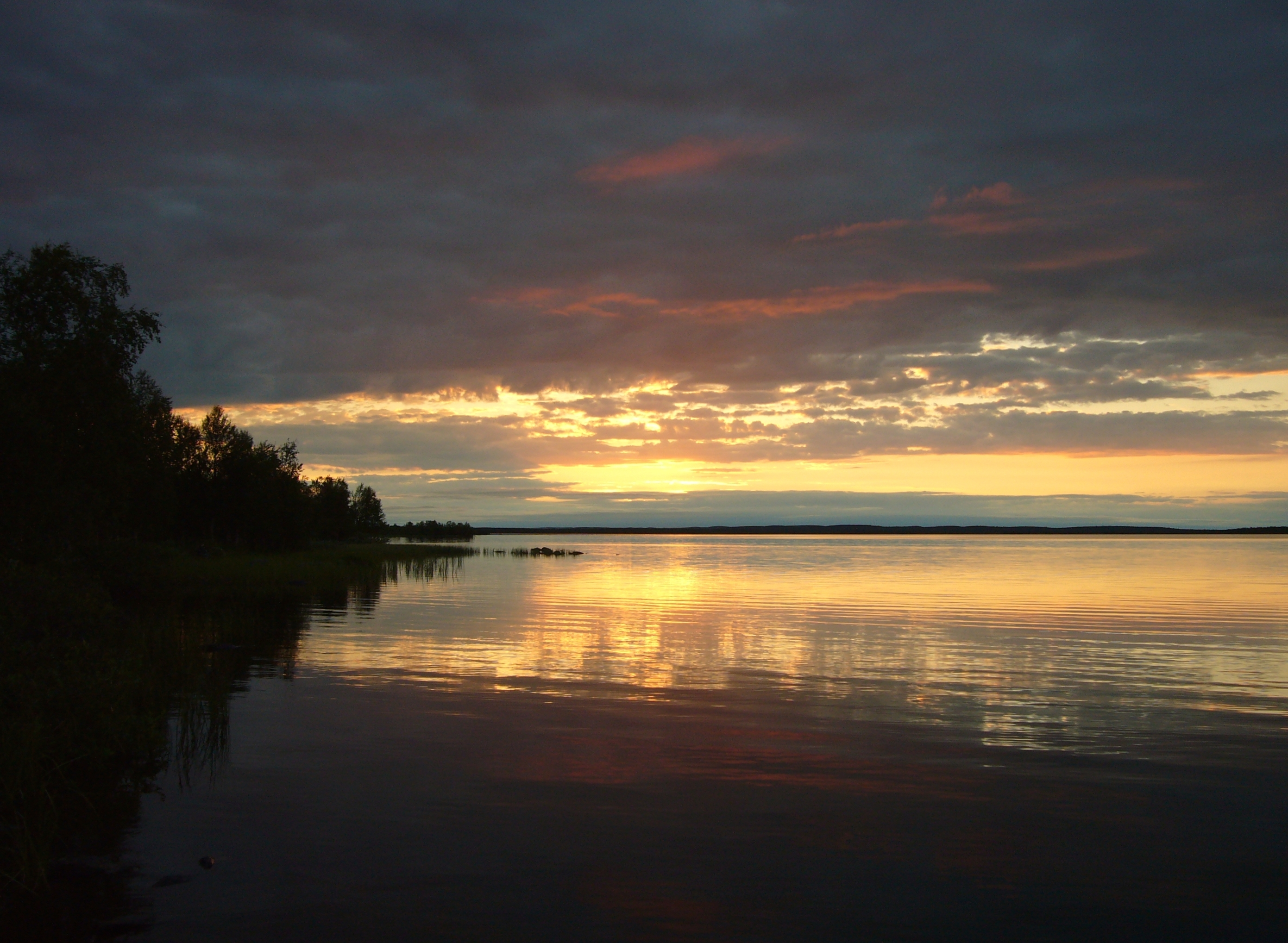

Syysjärvi is a medium-sized lake in the Vuoksi main catchment area. It is located in the region Southern Savonia and the municipality of Juva. On the shore of Kokonlahti bay there is a prehistory rock painting, which is not dated.

== See also ==
- List of lakes in Finland
