= Penkkarit =

Annual tradition among Finnish upper secondary school students

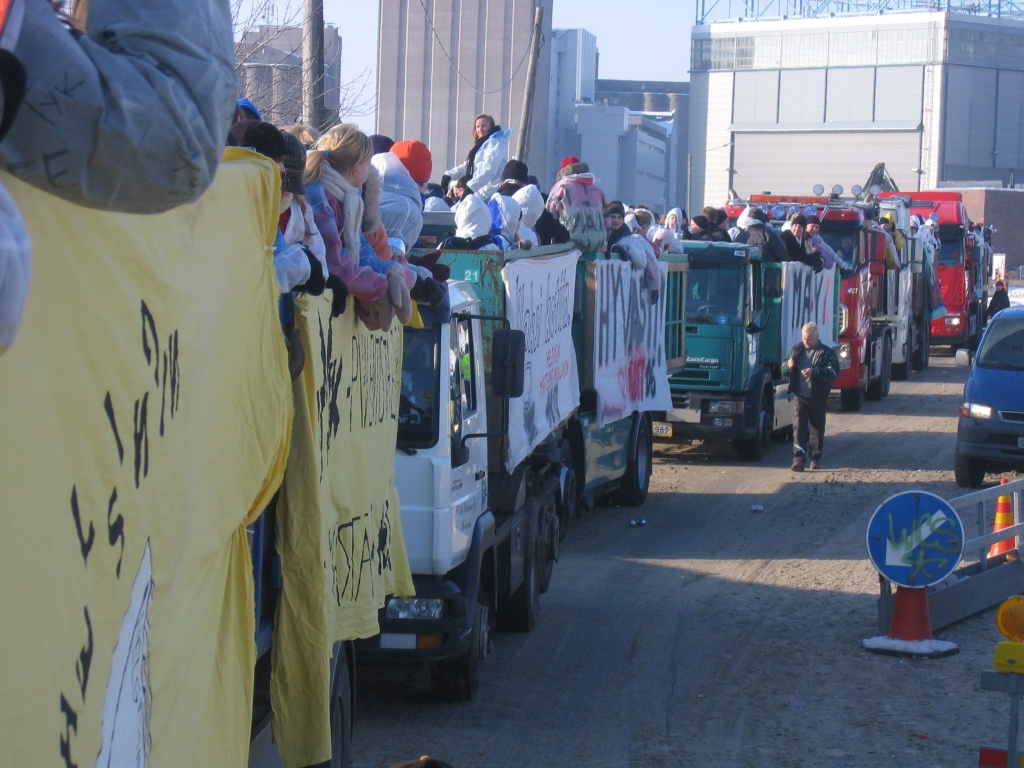
Lorries during penkkarit

Penkkarit (more formally penkinpainajaiset, "benchpressing [fest]", or bänkskuddardagen ("penkis, penkisdagen") in Swedish) is a yearly tradition among Finnish upper secondary school (Finnish: lukio) students. The event is celebrated in the spring of their final, usually third, year as the final day of school, before the start of the matriculation exams. Traditionally, the date of penkkarit is a Thursday in late or mid-February.

== The origin ==
Until 1919, the Finnish matriculation exam took place in University of Helsinki and was formally the entrance exam of this university. The upper secondary school students who wished to graduate left their hometowns for Helsinki, usually somewhat ceremonially. After 1919, the examination was conducted in schools. However, since the 1920s, the students stop attending classes in February, devoting themselves to solitary preparation for the exams which are held in March.

== Celebration ==
The celebration of the penkkarit varies from school to school. Usually, the school-leaving students dress as for a masquerade, following a theme decided by themselves. The event often includes following elements

- school-leavers visiting the classes of junior students, interrupting the teaching and replacing it with a parody class.
- throwing candy at the junior students
- visiting lower secondary or primary school, meeting old teachers and throwing candy
- singing parodic songs about the teachers
- presenting a humorous short film (Finnish: abivideo) to other students at the school hall

The ceremonies usually end with the school-leavers riding away from the school on lorries decorated for the purpose. The design of the decorations is usually a mixture of pride in and insult at their own school. Often, the students then visit the major local elementary schools.

In larger towns, the penkkarit culminate at a parade where the lorries drive across the city at a slow speed, and the final-year students on top of them shouting slogans and throwing candy at passers-by. The event is particularly popular among children, who come to the streets to collect free candy. For example, in April 2022 there were more than 4000 local final-year students in individual lorries and trucks that drove the students in around Central Helsinki.
