= Amoc (rapper) =

Finnish Sámi rapper (born 1984)

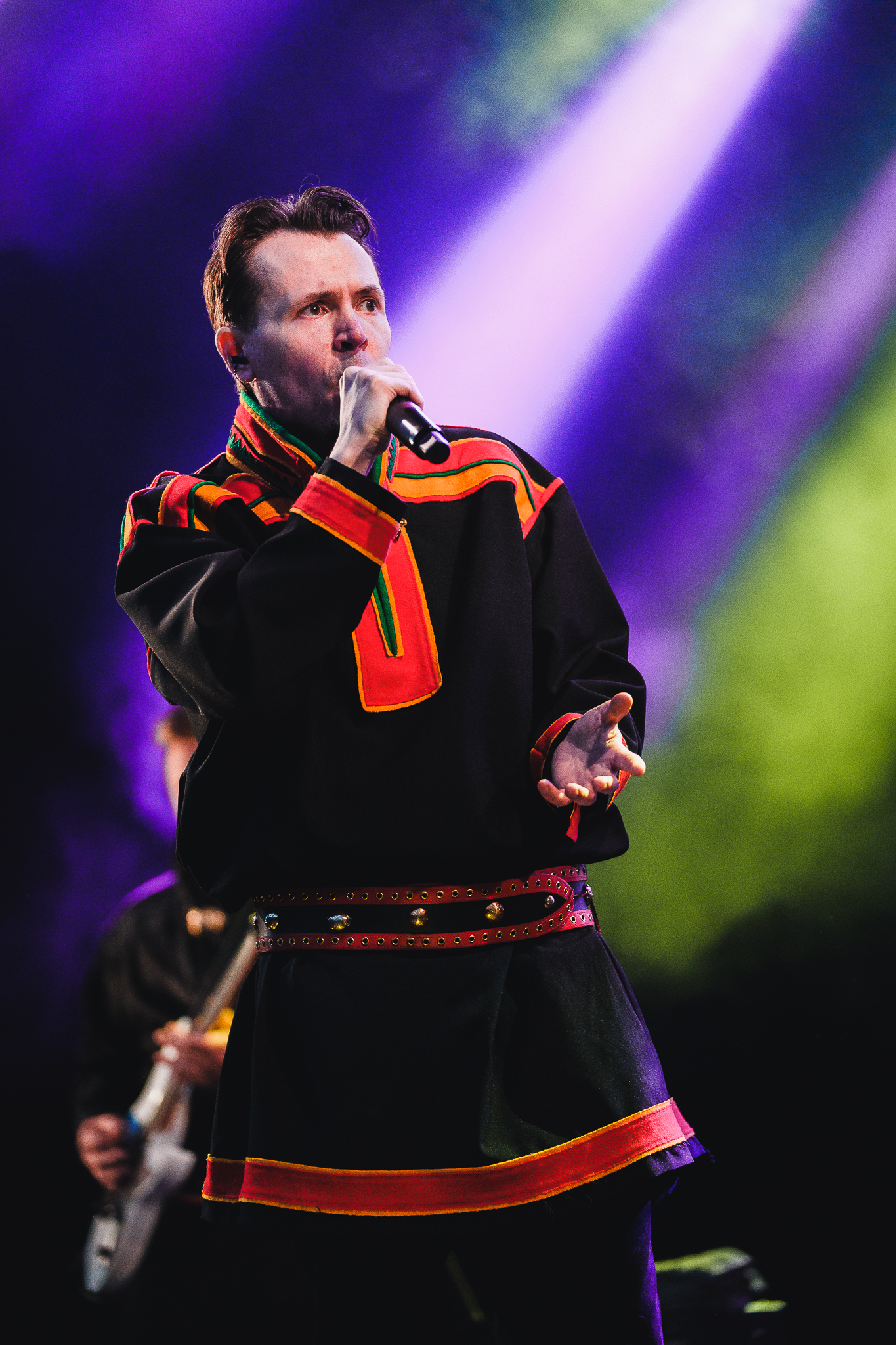
- Amoc at Riddu Riđđu (2022)

Background information
- Born: Mikkâl Antti Morottaja; 1984 (age 41–42); Inari, Finland
- Origin: Inari, Finland
- Genres: Hip hop; horrorcore
- Occupations: Rapper; language professor; film producer; singer; journalist
- Instrument: Vocals

Mikkâl Antti Morottaja (born 1984), known by his stage name Amoc (/ˈæmɒk/ AM-ok; an acronym for Aanaar Master of the Ceremony), is a Finnish Sámi rapper. He is noted for rapping in the severely threatened language of Inari Sámi. He was named as Finland's Young European of 2007.

== Biography ==
Amoc is of ethnic Finnish as well as Sámi descent. In addition to rapping in Inari Sámi, Amoc has also taught the language at various times at schools in Inari. He also studied filmmaking at Inari.

His father is Matti Morottaja, a prominent author, social activist and politician in the Inari Sámi community who is focused on preserving their language and identity.

== Style and influences ==
Besides his language, Amoc also distinguishes himself from most Finnish rappers by rapping with raw and provocative lyrics and using shock value. Many of his songs are made in storytelling style with lyrics focusing on horror, death, murder, monsters, Sami mythology and fantasy.

He has cited Tech N9ne, Jedi Mind Tricks, Eminem, Rammstein and Necro as his influences.

== Discography ==
=== Albums ===
- Amok-Kaččâm (2007)

=== Singles ===
- "Šaali" (2006)
- "Kiälláseh" (2016)
- "Kuobârpoolvâ maŋa" (2016)
- "Čuđeh" (2018)

== See also ==
- Sámi people
