= Inari Sámi people =

Sámi ethno-linguistic group

Inari Sámi Anarâšah
- Sámi flag

Regions with significant populations
- Finland: approx. 700 – 900

Languages
- Inari Sámi and Finnish

Religion
- Lutheranism

Related ethnic groups
- other Sámi peoples

Inari or Aanaar Sámi (Inari Sámi: anarâšah) are a group of Sámi people who inhabit the area around Lake Inari, Finland. They speak the Inari (Aanaar) Sámi language, which belongs to the eastern Sámi languages. There are an estimated 700–900 ethnic Inari Sámi in Finland, of whom approximately 300–400 speak Inari Sámi. They are the only group of Sámi who live within one state and one municipality. Inari Sámi are indigenous peoples of their area.

== Inari Sámi homeland ==
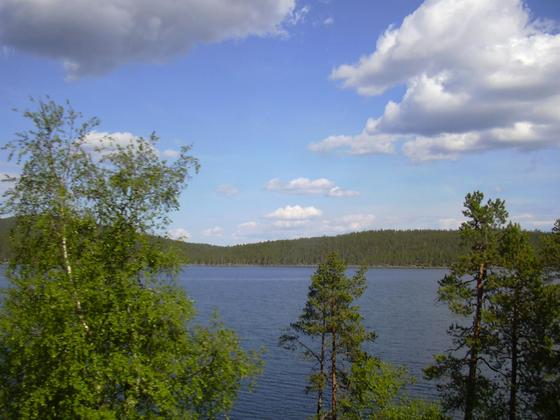
Lake Inari

The traditional homeland of Inari Sámi is the shores of the Lake Inari and the surrounding areas. Historically they are believed to have inhabited a much wider area. According to historic sources and place names, they have inhabited the area which borders Saariselkä and Ivalo River in the south; Lemmenjoki, Vaskajoki and Aksujärvi in the west; Syysjärvi, Säytsjärvi and Iijärvi in the northeast; and Lake Inari in the east. The northernmost border has possibly been at the Norwegian side of the Inari River. Their traditional homeland was divided to 11 family areas. Today their traditional homeland is in Inari municipality, where they form a minority of the population.

== History ==
The first traces of human activity in the Inari area are dated to 8000–7000 BC. The first inhabitants are believed to have belonged to the Komsa culture. Most of the artifacts found from early inhabitants are linked to hunting and fishing. The Bronze Age and Iron Age in Fennoscandia lasted from 2000 BC. to 1300 AD. There is only one discovery of bronze items from Inari. It was found on Lusmansaari in Lake Inari, and it is dated to 900–700 BC. Similarly, there is only one finding of an iron item from the early Iron Age. Most of the findings from the later Iron Age were imported. There were active trading connections with the east, west and south. In the Middle Ages, Norway, Sweden and Novgorod started competing for control of Lapland. Joint areas of taxation were born after the border treaty between Norway and Novgorod in 1326. The first written documents about Inari Sámi are from the 1550s.

Christianity begun spreading among Inari Sámi in 17th century; the first church was built in the area in 1642. During the Christian mission many old traditions disappeared. Some shamans were executed for practicing witchcraft. Finnish migration to Lapland began in the 17th century and Finnish settlement reached Inari in the late 18th century. There were also some Northern Sámi immigration after Norway and Russia closed their borders in 1852, and eastern Sámi immigration from south when Finnish settlement crawled northward. In 1920s Spanish flu killed 190 people in the Inari area, which constituted one-tenth of the population. After the Second World War Skolts from Pechenga area were evacuated and settled to Inari. Till the 1950s most Inari Sámi lived in natural economy, but this was changed rapidly and during this process the use of Inari Sámi language decreased.

== Culture ==
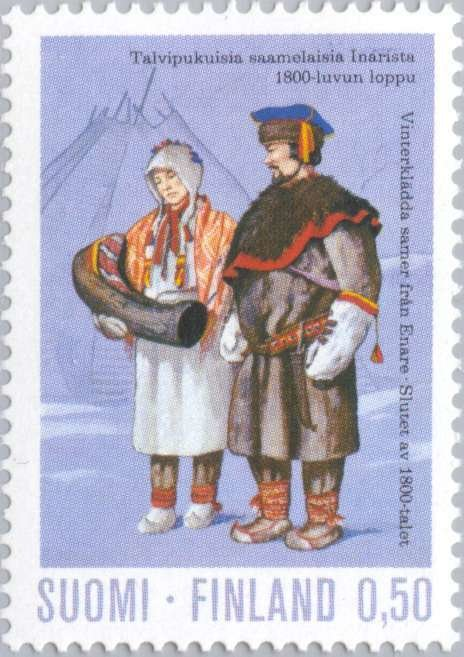
Inari Sámi in winter clothes at the end of the 19th century, depicted in a Finnish stamp from 1972.

Unlike most of other Sámi groups, Inari Sámi didn't historically practice large-scale reindeer husbandry. The more descriptive feature of Inari Sámi culture was fishing and hunting. Fishing lost its importance because Lake Inari was being overfished in the 20th century. The main hunting game was Finnish forest reindeer, but their numbers collapsed in the 18th century. Inari Sámi moved between winter and summer homes, though this practice disappeared quite early.

Inari Sámi mythology had some of the same gods as Finnish mythology did. Most important of them was Äijih, who had similar characteristics as Finnish Ukko had. Other gods included Piäiváž and Čäcialmai. Holy sites of Inari Sámi (sieidi) were often on islands of Lake Inari. Most important of them was Äijih. Only men were allowed to go into these holy sites, though women could go in if they dressed as men.

The Inari Sámi costume is seen as an important part of their identity, and it has been used in the Inari area uninterruptedly. The background of costumes is black or dark-blue with red, yellow and green used in the decor. Traditionally there was a winter garment (peski) which was made out of reindeer coat, but it has largely been replaced with modern snowmobile suits.
