= List of attacks related to secondary schools (2000s) =

This is a list of attacks related to secondary schools in the 2000s that have occurred around the world. These are attacks that have occurred on school property or related primarily to school issues or events.

A narrow definition of the word attacks is used for this list so as to exclude:

1. Incidents that occurred as a result of warfare, robberies, gang violence, public attacks (as in political protests)
2. Accidental shootings
3. Murder–suicides by rejected suitors or estranged spouses
4. Suicides or suicide attempts involving only one person.
5. Incidents involving only school staff, belongs at List of workplace killings
6. Events where no injuries take place
7. A foiled attack, belongs at List of unsuccessful attacks related to schools
8. Attacks that took place at colleges, belongs at List of attacks related to post-secondary schools

The listed attacks include shootings, stabbings, slashings, bombings, and beatings administered with blunt instruments.

== 2000s ==
Date	Location	Attacker(s)	Dead (Note: Including death or injury of attacker(s), when applicable.)	Injured	Description
March 16, 2000	Brannenburg, Bavaria, Germany	Michael F., 16	1 dead	1 injured	A 16-year-old student fatally shot a teacher and then shot himself in a suicide attempt, and has been in a coma ever since.
April 20, 2000	Ottawa, Ontario, Canada	15-year-old student		5 injured	A 15-year-old student at Cairine Wilson Secondary School in the suburban community of Orleans pulled out a knife and stabbed a fellow student whom he was conversing with, and then ran through the school stabbing another three students and a teacher's aide. Michael Jordan, the school principal finally convinced the youth to surrender the weapon.
May 26, 2000	Lake Worth, Florida, United States	Nathaniel Brazill, 13	1 dead		One teacher, Barry Grunow, was shot and killed at Lake Worth Middle School by 13-year-old Nate Brazill with .25-caliber semiautomatic pistol on the last day of classes. Brazill was convicted of the murder and sentenced to twenty-five years in prison.
August 4, 2000	Rafael Calzada, Buenos Aires, Argentina	Javier Romero, 19	1 dead	1 injured	Rafael Calzada school shooting: Tired of being nicknamed "Pantriste" by his 19-year-old Javier Romero, he waited after school, took a 22-caliber revolver out of his backpack and shot them, killing one of them, Mauricio Salvador, 16, and injuring another at the entrance to Rafael Calzada Middle School No. 9. The aggressor was found not guilty of the crime, and was admitted to a psychiatric.
September 26, 2000	New Orleans, Louisiana, United States			2 injured	Darrel Johnson, 13, and Alfred Anderson were initially charged with Louisiana attempted second degree murder in a school shooting where both were shot with the same gun.
October 19, 2000	New York City, United States	Rickley Gregoire, 16; Eduardo Hall, 16	1 dead		12-year-old Anthony Haynes was stabbed to death in the cafeteria of Canarsie High School. Two 16-year-old students were arrested for the crime. It was suspected that the stabbing was gang-related.
October 23, 2000	Los Angeles, California, United States		1 dead		20-year-old security guard Reginald Millsaps is shot to death at Western Academy Community Education Center by an unknown assailant.
October 24, 2000	New York City, United States		1 dead		While changing a tire on a teacher's car outside Bushwick High School, 18-year-old Joseph Gallo Rodriguez was accosted by two men looking to rob him of a silver crucifix. When he refused the robbers shot him and fled. Rodriguez died of the gunshot wound the next day.
November 23, 2000	Calgary, Alberta, Canada	16-year-old student	1 dead		17-year-old Samer Jaber is stabbed to death at Lester B. Pearson High School in Calgary by a 16-year-old student. The 16-year-old was later convicted of second-degree murder and sentenced to four years imprisonment.
January 17, 2001	Hollola, Finland	15-year-old male student		1 injured	15-year-old male student stabbed a 14-year-old male student four times with a jackknife after he was attacked.
January 18, 2001	Bromma, Stockholm, Sweden	17- and 19-year-old students	1 dead		A 16-year-old student was shot to death in a toilet facility of the Bromma Gymnasium, in Stockholm, Sweden. Two other students, ages 17 and 19, were charged with the murder.
March 5, 2001	Santee, California, United States	Charles Andrew Williams, 15	2 dead	13 injured	Santana High School shooting: Armed with a .22-caliber revolver, 15-year-old Charles Andrew Williams opened fire in a male toilet facility at Santana High School in Santee, California, killing one student. Then exiting the restroom, Williams fired indiscriminately at nearby students, killing another student and wounding 13. Shortly afterward he retreated back into the restroom, where he surrendered to police. In June 2002, Williams was sentenced to 50 years in prison.
March 6, 2001	Limeira, Brazil	16-year-old student	1 dead	2 injured	During an argument with his girlfriend's brother a 16-year-old student drew a pistol and began shooting at his high school, hitting three students nearby, one of them fatally.
March 7, 2001	Williamsport, Pennsylvania, United States	Elizabeth C. Bush, 14		1 injured	Elizabeth Bush shoots and injures Kimberly Marchese at Bishop Neumann High School.
March 22, 2001	El Cajon, California, United States	Jason Hoffman, 18		5 injured	18-year-old student Jason Hoffman opened fire with a handgun and shotgun at Granite Hills High School, in El Cajon, California, wounding three students and two teachers. Hoffman committed suicide in prison in 2002.
March 26, 2001	Machakos, Kenya	Felix Mambo Ngumbao, 16, and Davies Otieno Onyango, 17	67 dead	19 injured	Kyanguli Fire Tragedy: Two students set fire to a dormitory at Kyanguli Secondary School located in Machakos, 30 miles (48 km) southeast of Nairobi, after the final exam results were annulled and payment of their outstanding school fees was demanded. 67 people perished in the flames and another 19 were injured, including one of the perpetrators.
March 30, 2001	Gary, Indiana, United States	Donald Ray Burt Jr., 17	1 dead		Donald Ray Burt Jr., a 17-year-old expelled student, shot and killed 16-year-old student Neal Boyd III in the parking lot of Lew Wallace High School, in Gary, Indiana, Burt Jr. was sentenced to 57 years in prison on July 25, 2002.
May 22, 2001	Dedza, Malawi	Mathews Khonje, 22		3 injured	A repeat student known for fighting with students from a lower class, Mathews, 22, stabbed three of them with a knife and they were admitted to the hospital with minor injuries. Mathews used to intimidate and harass them in any way.
August 6, 2001	Macaúbas, Bahia, Brazil	Robério Souza de Oliveira, 18	1 dead	7 injured	Macaúbas school shooting: Robério Souza de Oliveira, an 18-year-old farmer, shot and wounded six students and a teacher with a shotgun at Escola Estadual Aloísio Short. He then committed suicide by shooting himself in the head.
November 12, 2001	Caro, Michigan, United States	Chris Buschbacher, 17	1 dead		17-year-old Chris Buschbacher, armed with a .22-caliber rifle and a 20-gauge shotgun, took one teacher and one student hostage at the Caro Learning Center before killing himself.
December 5, 2001	Springfield, Massachusetts, United States	Corey Ramos, 17	1 dead		At Springfield High School, a school for troubled teens, 17-year-old Corey Ramos stabbed to death Reverend Theodore Brown, a counselor at the school. In 2003, Ramos was sentenced to life in prison.
December 16, 2001	Kluczbork, Poland	Kazimierz J., 62	2 dead	1 injured	62-year-old retired teacher, former headmaster of another school and a hunter, Kazimierz J., went out during a break while the third class of a private post-secondary economic school was taking place at Vocational School Complex No. 1 named after Maria Skłodowska-Curie in Kluczbork. During the break, he began a conversation with his 42-year-old wife, Joanna J., which turned into an argument. After the quarrel, Kazimierz J. took out a kniejówka and shot his wife in the left thigh, causing fatal injuries. He then ran out of the school and went to his car. From there, he shot twice, in the abdomen and the neck, at 37-year-old railway worker Marek Laszczyński, who was entering the schoolyard and attempted to help the woman. Laszczyński died at the scene. Afterwards, the hunter got out of the car and committed suicide by shooting himself in the head. The motive for the crime was unjustified jealousy. The retired teacher suspected Laszczyński of having an affair with his wife, but the investigation revealed that there was no relationship between them other than friendship.
January 15, 2002	New York, New York, United States	Vincent Rodriguez, 17		2 injured	17-year-old Vincent Rodriguez shot and wounded two students at Martin Luther King Jr. High School in Manhattan, New York City, with a .380-caliber semi-automatic pistol. The possible motive was that the victims had harassed Rodriguez's girlfriend. In February 2003, Rodriguez was sentenced to 10 years in prison on charges of assault and attempted assault.
January 17, 2002	Riihimäki, Finland	14-year-old female student		1 injured	A 14-year-old female student shot a 14-year-old male student in the head with an air gun at Pohjolanrinne school. She also shot at doors and windows with the gun.
February 19, 2002	Freising, Germany	Adam Labus, 22	4 dead	1 injured	22-year-old Adam Labus killed his former boss and a worker in Eching, before driving to his former school in Freising where he shot and killed the principal and injured another teacher. He then committed suicide.
April 26, 2002	Erfurt, Thuringia, Germany	Robert Steinhäuser, 19	17 dead	7 injured	Erfurt massacre: 19-year-old Robert Steinhäuser, who was permanently expelled from school in October 2001, entered the Gutenberg-Gymnasium in Erfurt and shot and killed 13 teachers, two students and a police officer. He also wounded one more student. He then committed suicide.
April 29, 2002	Vlasenica, Bosnia and Herzegovina	Dragoslav Petkovic, 17	2 dead	1 injured	Vlasenica school shooting: 17-year-old Dragoslav Petkovic shot and killed his history teacher outside the school. He then made his way into the building where he shot and seriously injured another teacher. Petkovic then committed suicide inside the classroom with thirty students present.
September 26, 2002	Lanzhou, China	Yang Zhengming, 40	2 dead	2 injured	Yang Zhengming, who worked as a mini-bus driver for Number 34 Middle School in Lanzhou, killed a teacher and wounded two others at the school with a hunting rifle, one of the wounded being his former girlfriend. Police finally shot him dead after negotiating with him for two hours while he was standing on the roof and threatened to commit suicide.
October 7, 2002	Bowie, Maryland, United States	John Allen Muhammad, 41; Lee Boyd Malvo, 17		1 injured	A victim of the Beltway sniper attacks, 13-year-old Iran Brown was shot and wounded as he arrived at Benjamin Tasker Middle School in Bowie, Maryland. His aunt, a nurse who had just brought him to school, rushed him to a hospital emergency room. Despite serious injuries, including damage to several major organs, Brown survived the attack.
October 28, 2002	Salvador, Brazil	E. R., 17	2 dead		Sigma School shooting: A 17-year-old student identified as E. R., armed with an .38 revolver, shot Vanessa Carvalho Batista in the head, killing her instantly, he then fired shots at Natasha Silva Ferreira, both of them 15-year-old, seriously injuring her, in the Colegio Sigma. She then died at the hospital. E. R. then stayed on the school campus until police arrival and threatened to commit suicide but was convinced to not do so by his 21-year-old brother. The shooter said he did not have a good relation with the two girls, and said that they ridiculed him publicly.
January 14, 2003	Pori, Finland	15-year-old male student		1 injured	15-year-old male student stabbed a 13-year-old male student in the back with a filleting knife. The victims lung was punctured and he was seriously injured.
January 26, 2003	Suixi County, China	Chen Peiquan, 35	4 dead	3 injured	Chen Peiquan, an English teacher with a history of mental problems, stabbed six students and a teacher in a dormitory at Yang Gan Middle School, killing four of them. He was arrested after fleeing to the roof of the building.
January 27, 2003	Taiuva, Brazil	Edmar Aparecido Freitas, 18	1 dead	8 injured	Taiúva school shooting: 18-year-old Edmar Freitas shot and wounded six students, a teacher and a janitor with a 38-caliber revolver at Escola Estadual Coronel Benedito Ortiz, his former school where he had been bullied for being overweight. He then committed suicide by shooting himself in the head.
April 14, 2003	New Orleans, Louisiana, United States	Steven Williams, James Tate	1 dead	4 injured	John McDonogh High School shooting. 15-year-old Jonathan Williams, a student and football player, was fatally shot while sitting on the bleachers in the gymnasium of John McDonogh Senior High School, by two men armed with an AK-47 assault rifle and a handgun. The two gunmen fired at least 18 rounds from their weapons, shattering Williams' face, and injuring three girls.
April 24, 2003	Red Lion, Pennsylvania, United States	James Sheets, 14	2 dead		Red Lion Area Junior High School shooting. 14-year-old student James Sheets, armed with .44 and .357-caliber revolvers and a .22-caliber pistol, shot and killed Principal Eugene Segro and then committed suicide in the school cafeteria of Red Lion Area Junior High School, in Red Lion, Pennsylvania.
June 6, 2003	Amphoe Pak Phanang, Thailand	Anatcha Boonkwan, 17	2 dead	4 injured	Pak Phanang school shooting. Two students were killed and another four injured at Pak Phanang school, when Anatcha Boonkwan shot at them with a 9 mm semi-automatic pistol he had stolen from his father. The shooting apparently was triggered by an argument he had with one of his victims, the day before.
July 2, 2003	Coburg, Bavaria, Germany	Florian K., 16	1 dead	1 injured	Coburg shooting: Florian K., a 16-year-old student, fired at his teacher in his classroom, in a comprehensive school in Coburg, Germany. A second female teacher who struggled with the weapon was shot in the thigh and injured. He killed himself with a second gun shortly after.
August 25, 2003	Hamina, Kymenlaakso, Finland	17-year-old male student			A 17-year-old student was shot several times with .22-caliber revolver during a 2-hour standoff at Vehkalahti Upper Secondary School.
September 24, 2003	Cold Spring, Minnesota, United States	Jason McLaughlin, 15	2 dead		2003 Rocori High School shooting: 15-year-old Jason McLaughlin shot Aaron Rollins and Seth Bartell at Rocori High School with a .22- caliber pistol. Rollins died the same day; Bartell died October 10 of injuries sustained in the attack. McLaughlin was sentenced to life with two consecutive prison sentences in 2005.
December 8, 2003	Porter, Oklahoma, United States	Dustin Dillingham, 15	1 dead		15-year-old Dustin Dillingham stabbed 16-year-old Carl Andrew "Andy" Robinson on a school bus on the afternoon of December 8, 2003. The suspect jumped off the bus and ran into the woods, still carrying the knife. About a dozen students were on the bus during the stabbing, ranging from 5 to 18 years old. County road workers saw Dillingham hiding near a pond about three miles west of the search area. Officers arrested him and say he gave them no trouble and in fact showed them where he threw the knife he used to stab Robinson. Dillingham's family says he has been picked on and they had recently been encouraging him to stand up for himself.
January 13, 2004	The Hague, Netherlands	Murat Demir, 17	1 dead		Murat Demir shot Hans van Wieren, a 49-year-old teacher and vice principal at Stevincollege, also called Terra College by some. Van Wieren was taken to the hospital and died on January 13 in the evening as a result of his gunshot wound.
February 2, 2004	Washington, District of Columbia, United States	Thomas J. Boykin, 19	1 dead		19-year-old Thomas J. Boykin fatally shot 17-year-old James Richardson at Ballou Senior High School. Boykin was later acquitted on the charge of murder.
February 3, 2004	Palmetto Bay, Florida, United States	Michael Hernandez, 14	1 dead		14-year-old Michael Hernandez stabbed and slit the throat of a 14-year-old male classmate, Jaime Rodrigo Gough, a violinist, while in a restroom at Southwood Middle School. Hernandez was tried as an adult, and sentenced to life in prison without parole. A search of his home revealed he had concocted plans to murder several classmates and his older sister; he had tried to kill another student the day before the fatal incident. His journal revealed he was obsessed with perfection and Christianity, and admired Adolf Hitler and the Nazis. Hernandez died unexpectedly (no cause of death was given) in prison on Thursday, April 29, 2021. He had been re-sentenced to life without parole, despite apologizing for the crime, after the U.S. Supreme Court ruled that minors could not, at least automatically, be given whole life sentences for crimes, even first-degree murder.
March 1, 2004	Svitavy, Czech Republic	Vladimír K., 16	1 dead		A 16-year-old student of Svitavy Vocational Secondary School attacked his 60-year-old teacher with a knife in front of the class during the lesson, stabbing him 18 times. He was sentenced to 10 years in prison and released in March 2014.
May 24, 2004	Salt Lake City, Utah, United States	Federico Cervantes-Lavelle, 52	2 dead		Just after 6:00 A.M. on May 24, 2004, Federico Cervantes-Lavelle shot and killed his estranged wife, Marisela Lavelle, as she arrived at work at West High School in Salt Lake City. Cervantes-Lavelle then committed suicide.
September 27, 2004	Liceo Nueva Zelandia, Santa Juana, Chile	Fernando Fernández Luna, 17	1 dead		Armed with a 12-gauge shotgun, 17-year-old Fernando Fernández lured Ángelo Zúñiga Faúndez into a bathroom, where he shot and killed him as revenge in a love conflict. Due to his status as a minor at the tine, he was ultimately sentenced to 4 years' parole.
September 28, 2004	Carmen de Patagones, Argentina	Rafael Solich, 15	3 dead	5 injured	Carmen de Patagones school shooting. Armed with his father's 9 mm pistol, a 15-year-old student opened fire on his classmates during a flag-hoisting at Islas Malvinas Middle School Number Two in Carmen de Patagones, Argentina, killing three students and wounding 5 others.
November 26, 2004	Ruzhou, China	Yan Yanming, 21	9 dead	3 injured	An intruder stabbed nine students to death and injured three others at Ruzhou's Number Two High School in the sixth such incident in China in a four-month period.
December 10, 2004	Brampton, Ontario, Canada	Erhun Candir, 62	1 dead		A gunman shot 47-year-old grade 10 teacher Aysegul Candir in the head multiple times in the Bramalea Secondary School parking lot. Mrs. Candir was pronounced dead in hospital later in the day. Peel Regional Police would later apprehend Candir's 62-year-old husband, Erhun, and charge him with murder. Erhun Candir was later sentenced to life imprisonment.
March 2, 2005	Cumberland City, Tennessee, United States	Jason Clinard, 14	1 dead		14-year-old Jason Clinard shot and killed school bus driver Joyce Gregory, who had been carrying a bus of approximately 24 students, Clinard is serving a life sentence in prison.
March 21, 2005	Red Lake, Minnesota, United States	Jeff Weise, 16	10 dead	5 injured	2005 Red Lake shootings. Jeff Weise, a student at Red Lake High School in Red Lake, Minnesota, killed his grandfather and his grandfather's girlfriend before killing seven more people: five students, a teacher, and an unarmed security guard at Red Lake High School. The attack concluded when Weise exchanged fire with police, and then retreated to a classroom where he fatally shot himself.
June 10, 2005	Hikari, Yamaguchi, Japan	18-year-old student		58 injured	An 18-year-old student, whose name was not disclosed, threw a homemade bomb into a classroom at Hikari Senior High School, injuring 58 people, most of them slightly. The perpetrator later told police that the attack was directed against a group of students who had teased him for his shyness.
September 9, 2005	Bangkok, Thailand	Jitrada Tantiwanichayasuk, 34		4 injured	Jitrada Tantiwanichayasuk, a mentally disturbed woman, stabbed four girls at Saint Joseph Convent School in Bangkok, before escaping on a motorcycle. She was later arrested and sentenced to four years in prison.
September 13, 2005	Chicago, Illinois, United States	Unnamed 15-year-old		1 injured	At Harlan Community Academy High School, a fight broke between two 15-year-old boys in the gymnasium. One of the boys took out a .25-caliber pistol and shot the other one in the leg. A police officer on duty at the school arrested the gunman. The suspected shooter was charged as an adult with aggravated battery with a firearm.
September 15, 2005	Vienna, Austria	15-year-old student	1 dead		During a scuffle a student stabbed and killed a 14-year-old schoolmate at a Vienna school. He was sentenced to seven years in prison.
November 8, 2005	Jacksboro, Tennessee, United States	Kenneth Bartley Jr., 14	1 dead	2 injured	2005 Campbell County High School shooting: After being confronted about bringing a gun on school property, 14-year-old Kenneth Bartley opened fire on three school administrators at Campbell County High School, killing assistant principal Ken Bruce and critically wounding the principal and another assistant principal. The shooting was not premeditated.
November 22, 2005	Nusaybin, Turkey	Unnamed student	1 dead	4 injured	A student shot and killed a teacher and wounded four others with a rifle before being arrested.
January 13, 2006	Longwood, Florida, Florida, United States	Christopher David Penley, 15	1 dead		15-year-old Christopher Penley held his classroom at Milwee Middle School, in Longwood, Florida, Florida at gunpoint and holed himself in a restroom alcove, holding law enforcement at bay. He was eventually shot by a SWAT member, after raising the weapon at an officer. The weapon was a pellet gun.
February 23, 2006	Roseburg, Oregon, United States	Vincent Wayne Leodoro, 14		1 injured	14-year-old Vincent Leodoro shot 16-year-old fellow student Joseph Monti in the back four times with a 10mm semi-automatic pistol, critically injuring him, in the courtyard of Roseburg High School in Roseburg, Oregon. He was found guilty of attempted murder and assault in July 2006, and will be held in prison until he turns 25 years old.
March 14, 2006	Reno, Nevada, United States	James Scott Newman, 14		2 injured	2006 Pine Middle School shooting. 14-year-old student James Newman brought a .38-caliber revolver to Pine Middle School in Reno, Nevada, and shot and injured two students at random in the school's hallway before being restrained by a physical education teacher. Newman was charged as a juvenile for two counts of battery with a deadly weapon and was sentenced to house arrest and 200 hours of community service.
June 6, 2006	Los Angeles, California, United States		1 dead		17-year-old Venice High School junior Augustine Contreras was shot and killed in one of the school's parking lots shortly after the day's classes ended. He was shot after he went to the aid of his brothers, who were involved in a fight with several other young men. The fight was reportedly stemmed from a local gang dispute between Latino and black students. Two arrests were made but the suspects were released shortly thereafter.
August 30, 2006	Hillsborough, North Carolina, United States	Alvaro Rafael Castillo, 19	1 dead	2 injured	19-year-old Alvaro Rafael Castillo opened fire at Orange High School with a rifle and shotgun, shooting eight times and wounding two students. Officers ordered him to stop firing and he immediately complied. Castillo killed his father with a firearm before driving to school in a van. In the van police officers found ammunition, pipe bombs, and other weapons.
September 27, 2006	Bailey, Colorado, United States	Duane Morrison, 53	2 dead	6 injured	2006 Platte Canyon High School hostage crisis: A gunman, later identified as 53-year-old Duane Morrison of Denver, took six female students hostage at Platte Canyon High School. After sexually assaulting some of them, he released four of the hostages. When 16-year-old Emily Keyes tried to run away, Morrison shot her in the back of the head before killing himself. Keyes was flown to St. Anthony Central Hospital in Denver, where she died a short time later.
September 29, 2006	Cazenovia, Wisconsin, United States	Eric Hainstock, 15	1 dead		2006 Weston High School shooting: Eric Hainstock, 15, a freshman at Weston High School, brought a shotgun and a handgun to school and confronted the principal. The shotgun was wrestled away from him, but in a struggle over the handgun Hainstock shot the principal, who died later of his wounds. Hainstock had complained that the principal and teachers had failed to stop homophobic bullying directed at him. He also had recently received discipline for bringing tobacco to school and throwing a stapler at a teacher. Hainstock suffered from long term ADHD and abusive treatment at home. He was tried as an adult and sentenced to life in prison.
October 3, 2006	Ventspils, Latvia	Gatis Lagzdins, 16		4 injured	16-year-old Gatis Lagzdins injured four students in a stabbing incident.
October 9, 2006	Joplin, Missouri, United States	Thomas White, 13			A 13-year-old student fired a Norinco MAK-90 (a cheap AK-47 derivative) inside Memorial Middle School after confronting two others students and his principal. The student was wearing a mask and had pointed the gun at the principal, the assistant superintendent and two students. After firing a shot into the ceiling and breaking a water pipe, the student's gun jammed when he attempted to fire additional shots. The student was then confronted by police officers and taken into custody. Officers also found a note in the student's backpack indicating that he had placed an explosive in the school (which has 700 students). No one was injured in the incident. White was sentenced to 10 years in prison.
October 19, 2006	Orlando, Florida, United States	Kelvin De La Cruz, 17	1 dead		17-year-old Kelvin De La Cruz stabbed 15-year-old Michael Nieves in the chest with a pocket knife at a school bus stop of the Main Campus at University High School. After he stabbed him, Cruz hid under the bus and attempted to change his clothes, but was apprehended and charged with first-degree murder. Nieves died two hours after being stabbed.
November 20, 2006	Emsdetten, Germany	Bastian Bosse, 18	1 dead	37 injured	2006 Emsdetten school shooting. An 18-year-old former student entered the Geschwister Scholl school in western Germany with a sawed off shotgun, a 22 caliber rifle, a pistol and a set of explosive devices. The rampage started when Bosse shot and wounded six people with his guns. Police stormed the building, and the shooter released several smoke bombs as he retreated to the third floor, which caused injuries to people inside the school and police officers due to smoke inhalation. The suspect then killed himself.
January 3, 2007	Tacoma, Washington, United States	Douglas S. Chanthabouly, 18	1 dead		18-year-old Douglas S. Chanthabouly shot 17-year-old Samnang Kok to death in the Henry Foss High School hallways due to a personal disagreement. Chathabouly was found guilty of second-degree murder and was sentenced to 23 years of prison.
January 19, 2007	Sudbury, Massachusetts, United States	John Odgren, 16	1 dead		15-year-old James Alenson was stabbed to death with a knife in the Lincoln-Sudbury Regional High School washroom in the East House section by 16-year-old John Odgren. Odgren did not know Alenson, and he chose to stab him at random. In 2010, Odgren was found guilty of first-degree murder and was sentenced to life without parole. But was resentenced due to Massachusetts banning life without parole for juvenile offenders.
March 7, 2007	Midland, Michigan, United States	David Turner, 17	1 dead	1 injured	17-year-old David Turner shot and critically wounded 17-year-old Jessica Forsyth four times outside Herbert Henry Dow High School before killing himself in the parking lot.
March 17, 2007	Saba Yoi District, Thailand		3 dead	7 injured	A number of attackers threw explosives and fired numerous bullets at an Islamic school killing 3 teens and injured 7 others who were sleeping.
April 10, 2007	Gresham, Oregon, United States	Chad Escobedo, 15		10 injured	High school freshman Chad Escobedo shoots the windows out of two classrooms from outside Springwater Trail High School injuring ten students with shrapnel and broken glass, two of which required stitches. His motive was to shoot at a class in which he was enrolled, unhappy that the instructor had called his parents; the classrooms he hit, however, were not his intended target.
April 18, 2007	Huntersville, North Carolina, United States	Josh Emerson Cook, 16	1 dead		A 16-year-old threatened two students in the parking lot at North Mecklenburg High School with a gun, and shortly afterwards, had shot himself at a local gas station when confronted by police. Four Charlotte-Mecklenburg schools went on lockdown.
May 15, 2007	Maoming, China	Wu Jianguo, 17	2 dead	4 injured	17-year-old Wu Jianguo stabbed six classmates with a knife at Dianbai County No. 3 Middle School, killing two of them.
May 23, 2007	Toronto, Ontario, Canada	Two unnamed 17-year-olds	1 dead		15-year-old Jordan Manners was fatally shot on the campus of C.W. Jefferys Collegiate Institute in Toronto, Ontario. Two juveniles were arrested but later acquitted in connection with the shooting.
August 25, 2007	Jalna district, India	Three students	2 dead		Three 12- and 13-year-old students strangled an 8-year-old boy and his 5-year-old brother to death at a boarding school in hope the school would close down, so they would get a day off.
September 11, 2007	Toronto, Ontario, Canada	Unknown	1 dead		Dineshkumar Murugiah, a 16-year-old student, was fatally stabbed in an alleyway siding Winston Churchill Collegiate Institute, in the Scarborough part of Toronto, Ontario. Murugiah was on lunch break during the stabbing, which occurred around 12:05 p.m. local time. No suspects were ever sought in the stabbing.
September 28, 2007	Oroville, California, United States	Greg Dean Wright, 17			17-year-old student Greg Wright held twenty-seven students and a teacher hostage in a classroom at Las Plumas High School, in Oroville, California, for about two hours before surrendering to law enforcement; all but three of the hostages were released an hour within. Several shots were fired towards the air from Wright's weapon, a .22-caliber semi-automatic handgun, during the crisis. Wright was tried and convicted in adult court on charges of false imprisonment and firearms offenses and was sentenced to 22 years in prison in January 2008.
October 10, 2007	Cleveland, Ohio, United States	Asa Hailey Coon, 14	1 dead	4 injured	2007 SuccessTech Academy shooting: 14-year-old student Asa Coon, reportedly upset about a school suspension, went on a shooting spree at SuccessTech Academy, an alternative high school in Cleveland, Ohio, wounding two students and two teachers. He then fatally shot himself in a classroom.
October 11, 2007	Amsterdam, Netherlands	Hüseyin P., 14	1 dead		A 14-year-old student, identified only as Hüseyin P., stabbed 16-year-old classmate Youssef Mokhtari to death at a school in the Slotervaart borough of Amsterdam. The victim had reportedly made a joke about the surname of the perpetrator.
October 31, 2007	Tampere, Finland	16-year-old male student		1 injured	16-year-old male student stabbed another 16-year-old male student in the abdomen with a sharp weapon.
November 7, 2007	Tuusula, Finland	Pekka-Eric Auvinen, 18	9 dead	1 injured	Jokela school shooting. 18-year-old student Pekka-Eric Auvinen opened fire with a .22-caliber semi-automatic SIG Mosquito pistol at Jokela High School, in Tuusula, Finland. Six students, the school principal, and the school nurse were killed. The twenty-minute attack ended when Auvinen shot himself in the head, later dying that evening at a Helsinki hospital.
December 11, 2007	Gurgaon, Haryana, India	Akash Vadav, 14; Vikas Yadav, 13	1 dead		14-year-old student Abhishek Tyagi was shot five times at the Euro International School, in Gurgaon, India. Two other students, 14-year-old Akash Vadav and 13-year-old Vikas Yadav, were charged in connection with the shooting.
December 21, 2007	Union City, California, United States	Unknown	1 dead		Vernon Matthew Eddins, a 14-year-old student of James Logan High School, was shot dead at the doorstep of Barnard-White Middle School, in Union City, California. Police issued that the shooting was prompted by an argument escalating between Latino and African American groups of teenagers. No suspects were ever sought.
January 8, 2008	Lower Alsace Township, Pennsylvania, United States	Ian Chimenko, 13		3 injured	13-year-old student Ian Chimenko stabbed three of his classmates in a classroom at Antietam Middle-Senior High School, in Lower Alsace, Pennsylvania. Chimenko held faculty members at bay with a blowtorch before being subdued.
January 29, 2008	Mannar District, Sri Lanka	LTTE	17 dead	14 injured	Madhu school bus bombing. An accidental explosion of a claymore mine planted by the LTTE (Liberation Tigers of Tamil Eelam), a Sri Lankan militant organization, targeting the armed forces, resulted in the deaths of 17 civilians, including 11 children on a school bus in the Mannar District. Sri Lanka was engaged in a war against LTTE, known for attacking and killing innocent civilians in many occasions throughout a period of more than 30 years of its operation.
February 4, 2008	Memphis, Tennessee, United States			1 injured	At Hamilton High School, a 16-year-old student was shot in the leg during an argument with another student over rap music. The victim's injury was not life-threatening.
February 12, 2008	Oxnard, California, United States	Brandon David McInerney, 14	1 dead		15-year-old Lawrence Fobes King was shot in the head twice by 14-year-old classmate Brandon McInerney in the E.O. Green Junior High School computer lab in Oxnard, California. King was transported to St. John's Regional Medical Center in Oxnard under serious condition. Examiners declared King brain dead the following day. It was suspected that the motivation of the shooting was McInerney suspecting King was gay, in which a hate crime charge was filed. McInerney was sentenced to 21 years of prison on the charge of second-degree murder.
February 25, 2008	Leizhou, Guangdong, China	Chen Wenzhen	3 dead (including the perpetrator)	4 injured	Chen Wenzhen, a school drop-out with mental illness, attacked six students with a knife at Leizhou No. 2 Middle School, in Leizhou, China, killing two of them. He then committed suicide by stabbing himself in the abdomen and jumping out of a window in the fifth floor.
March 6, 2008	Mobile, Alabama, United States	Jajuan Holmes, 18	1 dead		Jajuan Holmes, an 18-year-old student on suspension, walked into the gym area at Davidson High School and shot himself in front of 150 students. The school was put on lockdown for the day.
April 16, 2008	Fresno, California, United States	Jesus Carrizales, 17	1 dead	1 injured	Carrizales struck a Roosevelt High School resource police officer on the head with a baseball bat, and then the officer fatally shot him once in the chest.
April 28, 2008	Meyzieu, France	Philippe, 15		4 injured	A 15-year-old student, whose name was only revealed as Philippe, stabbed a girl and two boys at Olivier de Serres middle school in Meyzieu, just after he had sent an SMS to a friend stating: "I will kill them." The boy, who was himself wounded during the attack, then escaped, but was arrested by police one hour later. Philippe, who was said to have been inspired by American school shootings and had planned the attack for several months, wanted to take revenge on 7–8 of his schoolmates with whom he didn't get along.
May 12, 2008	Cornwall, Ontario, Canada	17-year-old student	1 dead		A 16-year-old boy was stabbed to death in a classroom at the T.R. Leger School by a 17-year-old classmate shortly before noon. The suspect fled the scene along a nearby bicycle path, but following a brief foot chase, was apprehended without incident. It was later revealed that the two individuals were involved in a fight outside the school earlier that morning, and the suspect went home to get a knife before returning to school.
August 14, 2008	Federal Way, Washington, United States	Luis F. Cosgaya-Alvarez, 16	1 dead		26-year-old Omero Mendez was sitting in his car parked on the Lakota Middle School campus to wait to pick up his girlfriend's son. There, he was confronted by 16-year-old Luis F. Cosgaya-Alvarez and two of his friends who were inside an SUV. Cosgaya-Alvarez flashed gang signs at Mendez, and then shot Mendez once in the head. Mendez later died of his injuries. Cosgaya-Alvarez was arrested a few days later in Seattle and was charged with murder. Cosgaya-Alvarez pleaded guilty to murder and weapon enhancements and was sentenced to 18 years in prison.
August 19, 2008	Krugersdorp, Gauteng, South Africa	Morné Harmse, 18	1 dead	3 injured	Nic Diederichs Technical High School slashing. One student was killed and another student and two campus groundskeepers were wounded at Nic Diederichs Technical High School, in Krugersdorp, South Africa, after 18-year-old matrics student Morné Harmse had slashed them with a samurai sword. On October 10, 2009, Harmse was sentenced to 20 years in jail.
August 21, 2008	Cheonan, South Chungcheong, South Korea	Lee, 38	1 dead		A 38-year-old school repairman, identified only as Lee, stabbed to death his boss, Kang, inside an administrative office at a high school in Cheonan, South Korea.
August 21, 2008	Knoxville, Tennessee, United States	Jamar Siler, 15	1 dead		15-year-old Ryan McDonald was shot to death by 15-year-old fellow student Jamar Siler in the cafeteria of Central High School, in Knoxville, Tennessee.
September 16, 2008	Toronto, Ontario, Canada	Mark Deicsics, 18; Jermaine Williams, 16; two unidentified 16-year-old juveniles		1 injured	A 16-year-old student received a gunshot wound to the chest in the parking lot of the Bendale Business and Technical Institute, in Scarborough, Toronto, after a handgun was accidentally discharged during a botched robbery attempt involving several people. The victim was transported to Sunnybrook Hospital in critical condition, where he underwent emergency surgery. Police arrested four suspects, including the victim and two other juveniles.
October 16, 2008	Detroit, Michigan, United States	William Morton, 15	1 dead	3 injured	Christopher Walker, 16, was killed, and three other teenagers were seriously wounded during a drive-by shooting at a primary school lawn adjacent to Henry Ford High School, where Walker and the other students were just dismissed from after classes ended. Three teenagers were arrested and charged in connection with the shooting. William Morton, 15, the shooter, was sentenced to life without parole, and Devon Bell was sentenced to 42 years of prison.
October 31, 2008	Stockton Springs, Maine, United States	Randall Hofland, 55			Eleven fifth-grade students were taken hostage in a classroom at Stockton Springs Elementary School, in Stockton Springs, Maine. The hostage situation ended within 30 minutes when the gunman surrendered to a state trooper. The hostage taker, 55-year-old Randall Hofland, was wanted by authorities for pointing a handgun at an officer during a traffic stop and then fleeing.
November 9, 2008	Eunpyeong District, Seoul, South Korea	Kim	1 dead	1 injured (the perpetrator)	Kim, unemployed, told the police that in 1987 as a 10th grader, his teacher surnamed Song accused him of cheating in a test and severely beat him about 100 times, thus killing the teacher outside his house over the 21-year grudge, while also injuring himself.
November 12, 2008	Fort Lauderdale, Florida, United States	Teah Wimberly, 15	1 dead		15-year-old student Amanda Collette was shot to death by her 15-year-old classmate, Teah Wimberly, in a hallway of Dillard High School, in Fort Lauderdale, Florida. The shooter was arraigned on the charge of first-degree murder She was sentenced to 25 years to life in prison.
November 23, 2008	Baltimore, Maryland, United States	Timothy Oxendine, 14	1 dead		15-year-old Markel Williams was stabbed to death on the grounds of William H. Lemmel Middle School, during school hours. 14-year-old Timothy Oxendine was tried as an adult and was convicted of first-degree murder. He initially faced up to 50 years of prison. In 2010, Oxendine was sentenced to 20 years of prison.
November 24, 2008	Cabaret, Haiti	Unnamed 16-year-old	1 dead		A 16-year-old shot and killed a 13-year-old classmate in Cabaret, Haiti, before fleeing the scene.
January 9, 2009	Chicago, Illinois, United States	Georgio Dukes, 18		5 injured	Five male teenagers leaving a basketball game held on the campus of Dunbar Vocational Career Academy, in the South Side area of Chicago, Illinois, received gunshot wounds after shots were fired from a passing vehicle. All five victims were sent to Chicago area hospitals, three of whom were treated for serious injuries. Police arrested 18-year-old Georgio Dukes a week after the shooting on five counts of aggravated battery with a firearm. Police determined that the attack was gang-related.
January 15, 2009	San Francisco, California, United States	14-year-old student		1 injured	A 14-year-old female student was struck eight times with a pair of scissors in a classroom at Marina Middle School, in San Francisco, California, by another 14-year-old female classmate. The victim suffered wounds to the head, arms, chest, and back and was treated at a local hospital. The attacker was arraigned on charges of attempted murder and assault.
January 21, 2009	Benque Viejo, Belize	16-year-old unnamed student		1 injured	Today two 16-year-old boys began fighting over a girl. The fight turned violent at around 12:45 p.m. when one of the boys stabbed his opponent, Abelio Leon, in the abdomen. Abelio was rushed to Loma Luz Hospital for treatment. The unidentified perpetrator was arrested by police and charged with dangerous damage, use of lethal force and attempted murder.
March 3, 2009	Auckland, New Zealand	Tae Won Chung, 17		1 injured	David Warren, a teacher at Avondale College, was stabbed in the back while writing on a whiteboard by 17-year-old Korean exchange student Tae Won Chung at the school. Warren was transported to a hospital with non-lifethreatening injuries. Chung was sentenced to 18 months imprisonment and ordered to pay NZ$10,000 in reparation.
March 6, 2009	Fayetteville, North Carolina, United States	Terrance Donnell Johnson Jr., 19		1 injured	A 15-year-old male was struck in the foot with a bullet at a parking lot of Westover High School, in Fayetteville, North Carolina. The shooting occurred when 19-year-old Terrance Donnell Johnson Jr. fired several shots from a handgun at his opponents during a fashion show held at the school.
March 11, 2009	Winnenden, Baden-Württemberg, Germany	Tim Kretschmer, 17	16 dead	9 injured	2009 Winnenden shootings: 17-year-old graduate student Tim Kretschmer opened fire with a semi-automatic 9mm Beretta pistol in two classrooms at the Albertville-Realschule, in Winnenden, Germany, killing nine students and one teacher; another two teachers were shot to death in a hallway by Kretschmer as he fled the school. Kretschmer then killed a bystander outside a nearby psychiatric hospital, and fled by vehicle to Wendlingen, a neighboring town, where he killed two bystanders at a car dealership and instigated a gun-battle with police. Kretschmer committed suicide during the exchange of gunfire.
March 30, 2009	Pietermaritzburg, KwaZulu-Natal, South Africa	17-year-old student and 19-year-old cousin	1 dead		17-year-old student Nhlanhla Buthelezi died from stab wounds to the chest and back outside a classroom of Amakholwa High School, near Pietermaritzburg, South Africa. The two assailants, a 17-year-old student and his 19-year-old cousin, fled the school.
April 8, 2009	Zhemgang, Bhutan	Dorji Gyeltshen, 19		6 injured	On March 10, 2009, Dorji Gyeltshen, 19, from Kheng Zurphel, was admitted to Yebilaptsa Secondary School. Ten days later, he was expelled for drinking and fighting. Days later, on April 8, 2009, a teacher on duty saw him on campus and told him that he was going to the school canteen. However, Dorji just hung around and did not go to the canteen. The teacher informed the principal and then gathered ten male students and asked Dorji to leave. Dorji refused the polite request and started arguing. He then pulled out a knife and started beating some of the students. Kinley Wangdi, a tenth grade student, was injured in the head and left hand. Another tenth grade student, identified only as Samten, was injured in the left shoulder. Dorji also injured four other students. The injured students were taken to the hospital for treatment while police arrested Dorji. The attack occurred in the afternoon.
April 29, 2009	Portmore, St. Catherine, Jamaica	15-year-old student		1 injured	The Dean of Discipline of Ascot High School, in Portmore, Jamaica, was stabbed in the neck while inside his office by a 15-year-old student at the school. The dean was treated at a local hospital and released.
May 11, 2009	Sankt Augustin, North Rhine-Westphalia, Germany	Tanja O., 16		1 injured	A 16-year-old student, Tanja O., entered the Albert Einstein gymnasium (high school), in Sankt Augustin, Germany, carrying knives, incendiary explosives, gunpowder, a flamethrower, and an air-powered pistol. O. attempted to torch the school but was confronted by another student in the girls' restroom, who O. then slashed in the hand. The victim's thumb was severed and she was treated a local hospital. O. subsequently fled the school, and was apprehended several hours later by police.
June 15, 2009	San Francisco, California, United States	Jacquez Tucker, 18; Unknown shooter		3 injured	Three people, including two students, were injured after several shots were fired into a crowd as a summer school class was just released at International Studies Academy High School. The shooting occurred a block away from the grounds. Police arrested an 18-year-old as an accessory in the shooting.
June 17, 2009	Mississauga, Ontario, Canada	16- and 17-year-old students		5 injured	Four students and a teacher suffered stab wounds after a fight at St. Joseph Secondary School, a Catholic high school in Mississauga, Ontario. Two of the injured students were transported to Credit Valley Hospital with severe stab wounds. Two students, ages 16 and 17, were later arrested and charged with attempted murder.
June 24, 2009	Parkersburg, Iowa, United States	Mark Becker, 24	1 dead		Mark Becker entered the weight room of Aplington-Parkersburg High School, in Parkersburg, Iowa, and shot football coach Ed Thomas inside the weight room. Thomas was airlifted to Covenant Medical Center in Waterloo, Iowa, where he later died of his wounds. Becker was arrested and charged with first-degree murder. Becker was sentenced to life in prison without the possibility of parole.
June 29, 2009	Walsall, England, United Kingdom	14-year-old unnamed student		1 injured	Two 14-year-old boys got into a fight over a football game when one of them pulled out a knife and stabbed his opponent in the upper thigh. School staff quickly called the authorities and the injured boy was taken to a hospital for treatment. Police arrested the perpetrator and charged him with suspicion of causing injury. The fight happened around midday.
July 16, 2009	Ncabaneni, Swaziland	Sicelo Dlamini, 22	2 dead	10 injured	Three boys and eight girls were stabbed with a spear by Sicelo Dlamini at classrooms in Ncabaneni High School, in Ncabaneni, Swaziland, who was then chased and beaten to death by a mob of outraged students. Besides Dlamini, one of the wounded girls died at the scene.
August 24, 2009	San Mateo, California, United States	Alex Robert Youshock, 17			Two pipe bombs went off in a hallway of Hillsdale High School, in San Mateo, California, during the beginning of first period classes. Nobody was injured from the explosions. Alex Youshock, a 17-year-old former student of the school, was held by staff members until police arrived and was found with eight other pipe bombs, a two-foot-long sword, and a chainsaw concealed in a guitar case. Youshock was subsequently arrested and charged as an adult with eight felonies. Youshock was sentenced to 25 years of prison.
August 31, 2009	Welkom, Free State, South Africa	Jaco Stiglingh, 51	2 dead (including the perpetrator)		Jaco Stiglingh, a teacher at Gimnasium High School in Welkom, South Africa shot and killed deputy principal Johan Liebenberg, 53, inside his office before turning the gun on himself and committing suicide.
September 11, 2009	Owosso, Michigan, United States	Harlan James Drake, 33	2 dead		James Pouillon, 63, was killed in a drive-by shooting in front of Owosso High School, in Michigan, where he was protesting against abortion. Several students witnessed the attack but none were injured. An hour later the body of business owner Mike Fuoss was found shot to death inside his office at Fuoss Gravel. Police arrested Harlan James Drake after the shootings and charged him with two counts of first-degree murder, he was later sentenced to life in prison.
September 15, 2009	Coral Gables, Florida, United States	Andy Rodriguez, 17	1 dead		Juan Carlos Rivera, a 17-year-old student of Coral Gables Senior High School, located in the Coral Gables suburb of Miami, Florida, was stabbed in the chest by another student and died. The stabbing happened during a fight between the two students, reportedly over a girl. 17-year-old student Andy Rodriguez was arrested for the crime. In November 2011, Rodriguez was sentenced to 40 years and 10 years of probation.
September 16, 2009	Antioch, California, United States	Yousuf Mohammad Aziz, 19		1 injured	A 16-year-old student of Deer Valley High School, in Antioch, California, was shot in the arm and torso after an argument between two groups of young men. The shots were fired from a vehicle, which then drove off. The victim was lifted by air to John Muir Medical Center in Walnut Creek and underwent surgery. Yousuf Mohammad Aziz, a 19-year-old graduate of Deer Valley, was arrested on September 18 in connection with the shooting. Aziz was found guilty of attempted murder, and was sentenced to 7 years to life in prison.
September 17, 2009	Ansbach, Bavaria, Germany	Georg R., 18		11 injured	Ansbach school attack. An 18-year-old student identified as Georg R. arrived at Carolinum High School in Ansbach, Germany armed with an axe, knives and Molotov cocktails. He injured nine students and a teacher at the school before he himself was shot by police. Two of the injured students as well as the attacker were reported to be in critical condition.
September 23, 2009	Tyler, Texas, United States		1 dead		50-year-old Todd Henry, a special education teacher at John Tyler High School, was fatally stabbed by a student inside a classroom at the school. Henry later died of his injuries at a local hospital. The attacker was taken into custody.
October 12, 2009	Deerfield Beach, Florida, United States	Five teenage boys, aged 13–15		1 injured	Five male students of Deerfield Middle School set 15-year-old boy Michael Brewer on fire after coating him in rubbing alcohol. Michael was transported to a hospital to recover from burns covering 80% of his body. All five of his attackers were arrested.
October 16, 2009	Carolina Forest, South Carolina, United States	Trevor Varinecz, 16	1 dead	1 injured	Trevor Varinecz, a junior at Carolina Forest High School, attacked and stabbed police officer Marcus Rhodes, the School Resource Officer, inside his office. Rhodes then shot Varinecz in self defense. Varinecz later died in hospital.
October 30, 2009	Long Beach, California, United States	Tom Vinson, 16; Daivion Davis, 16	1 dead	2 injured	16-year-old Melody Ross, a junior at Wilson Classical High School, was fatally shot leaving a homecoming game at the school. Two males, aged 18 and 20, were also injured in the shooting. Tom Vinson and Daivion Davis were later arrested and charged with murder and two counts of attempted murder. Vinson was sentenced to 155 years of prison. Davis was sentenced to 8 years on a manslaughter charge.

== See also ==
- List of attacks related to secondary schools (before 2000)
- List of attacks related to secondary schools (2010s)
- List of attacks related to secondary schools (2020s)
- School bullying
- School shooting
- List of school-related attacks
- List of school shootings in the United States (before 2000)
- List of school shootings in the United States (2000–present)
- List of attacks related to primary schools
- List of attacks related to post-secondary schools
- List of rampage killers: School massacres
