= Ohio school shooting =

Ohio school shooting may refer to:

- 2007 SuccessTech Academy shooting, 2007
- 2012 Chardon High School shooting, 2012
