= 2006 Platte Canyon High School hostage crisis =

Hostage-taking and shooting in Bailey, Colorado

Coordinates: 39°25′16″N 105°32′09″W

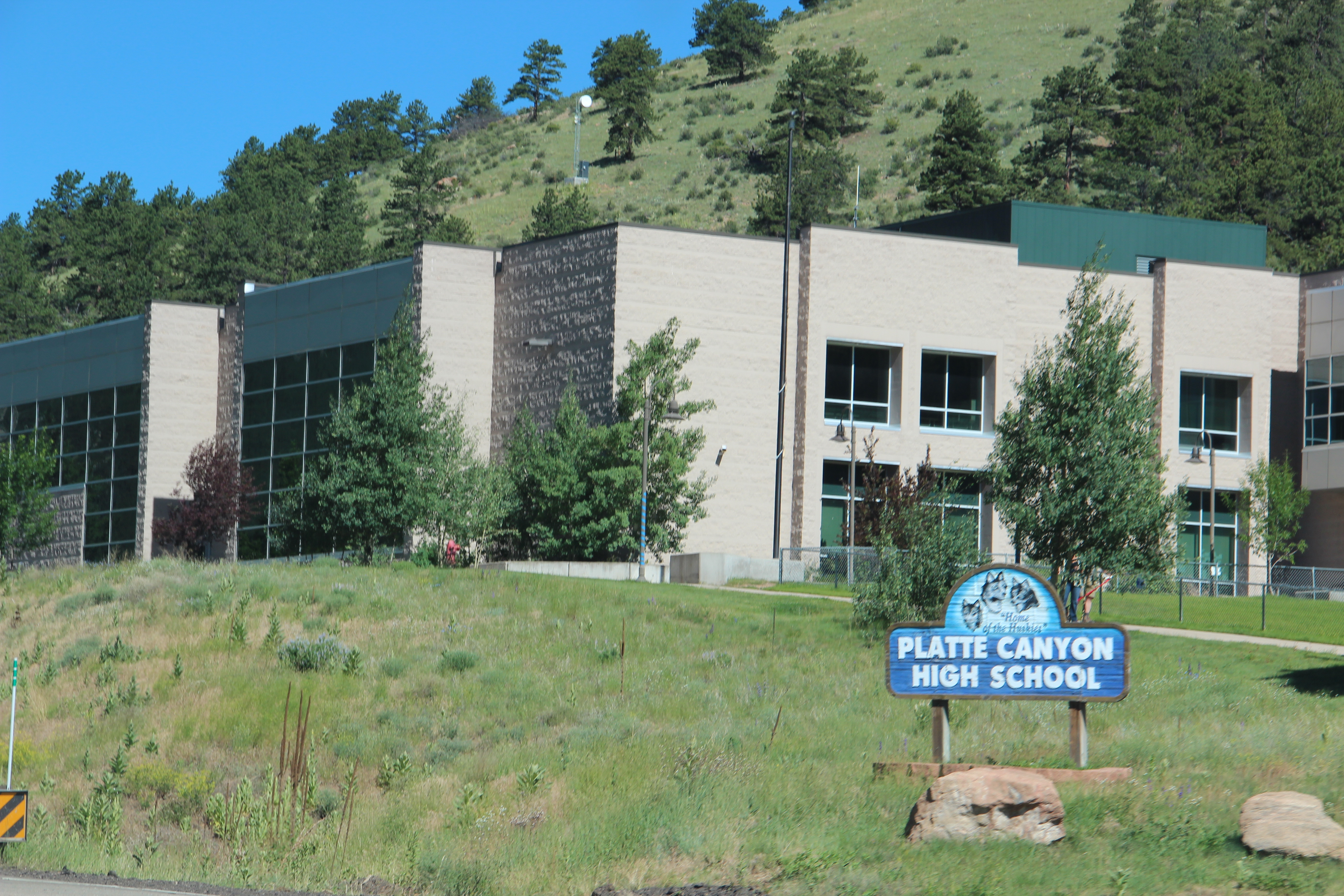
- Platte Canyon High School in 2016
- Location: Bailey, Colorado, U.S.
- Date: September 27, 2006; 20 years ago 11:40 a.m. – 3:45 p.m. (MDT; UTC−06:00)
- Target: Platte Canyon High School
- Attack type: School shooting, murder-suicide, hostage taking, sexual assault
- Weapons: Glock 22 .40-caliber semi-automatic pistol; Smith & Wesson Model 66 .357 Magnum revolver (Unused)
- Deaths: 2 (Keyes and the perpetrator)
- Injuries: 7 (via sexual assault)
- Perpetrator: Duane Roger Morrison
- Motive: Specific intent to commit sexual violence

The Platte Canyon High School hostage crisis was a hostage taking and shooting at Platte Canyon High School in Bailey, Colorado, United States, on September 27, 2006. The gunman, 53-year-old Duane Roger Morrison, took seven female students hostage and sexually assaulted them, later releasing four. When police broke open the classroom's door with explosives, Morrison opened fire with a semi-automatic pistol before shooting hostage Emily Keyes in the head. The other remaining hostages escaped unharmed, and paramedics confirmed that Morrison had committed suicide shortly before police were able to enter the classroom. Keyes was pronounced dead at 4:32 p.m. MDT (23:32 UTC) at Saint Anthony's Hospital in Denver, Colorado, after undergoing emergency surgery.

== Details ==
=== Entry and hostage-taking ===
Events preceding the shooting
Note: All times below are in Mountain Daylight Time, UTC-6
8:42 a.m.	Morrison's Jeep was seen arriving in the upper administration parking lot.
8:44 a.m.	Morrison's Jeep departed.
8:46 a.m.	Morrison's Jeep was seen in the space where it would later be discovered. It departed eleven minutes later.
9:44 a.m.	Morrison's Jeep returned.
10:53 a.m.	Morrison exited Jeep.
11:40:59 a.m.	First call from school to Park County Sheriff's office.
11:43:28 a.m.	First officer arrived at school.

Note: All times are in Mountain Daylight Time, UTC-6

At about 11:40 a.m., Morrison entered the school carrying a .40 S&W caliber Glock 22 pistol, a Smith & Wesson .357-caliber revolver (which wasn't used during the incident), and a backpack, which he claimed contained "three pounds of C-4". A search of the backpack later recovered duct tape, handcuffs, knives, a stun gun, rope, scissors, massage oil, sex toys, and numerous rounds of ammunition, but no explosives.

A sixteen-year-old student named Katrina Keller reportedly saw Morrison entering the school before the time specified by police. She stated that she had been walking past a vacant classroom and saw a man inside wearing a hooded sweatshirt, apparently angry. Keller did not report the incident to the school office. Other students reported that they witnessed Morrison sitting in a yellow Jeep in the school parking lot at around 10:45 a.m., almost an hour before he entered the school. Morrison was believed to have been living in the car, camping out near Bailey. Videos taken from security cameras outside show that Morrison was in his Jeep for at least 20 minutes, mingling with students as classes changed, 35 minutes before the siege began. Earlier, Morrison had spoken to a male high school student that day and "asked about the identity of a list of female students."

Morrison entered a classroom on the second floor, room 206, where teacher Sandra Smith taught Honors English. When Smith asked him what he was doing in the classroom, he pulled out his handgun and ordered her, all of the male students, and several female students to leave. He ordered the remaining students to line up against the chalkboard at the front of the class. One male student attempted to fight back against this, and when he did so, Morrison fired a single round past all of the lined up students at eye level, which then hit the wall adjacent to the chalkboard. At this time, Smith and the remaining students had left the room, and seven girls were left to continue lining up against the board.

He later released one student at approximately 12:15 p.m., before law enforcement arrived at the scene. Over the next several hours, four of the girls held hostage were released one at a time from the room, then escorted out of the building by SWAT and other law enforcement.

Park County sheriff Fred Wegener (whose son was in the school building at the time of the incident) informed the media that all seven girls were molested, though he did not know "how much or to what degree." Lynna Long, a 15-year-old sophomore and one of the seven hostages, stated that Morrison lined the girls up facing a chalkboard and then sexually assaulted all of them; Long stated that she knew that the other hostages were being molested because of "the rustling of clothes and elastic being snapped and zippers being opened and closed." During the sexual assaults, Morrison reportedly held his gun to the hostages' heads and threatened to kill them if they did not cooperate. According to the first hostage released, Morrison would systematically take individual hostages from the blackboard and further into the interior of the classroom before sexually assaulting them.

=== Negotiations and evacuations ===
A "code white" alert was sounded over the intercom and students were instructed to remain in their classrooms. Negotiations with Morrison began with the goal of allowing the six remaining hostages in the room to be released. Initially, he directly spoke to deputies in the hallway while holding one of the hostages at gunpoint, but later spoke via telephone and used the student hostages as relayers between the negotiators and himself, as he did not want to speak directly with officials. After four of the six girls were released between the hours of 12:35 p.m. and 1:45 p.m., negotiators heightened the intensity of their indirect discussions with Morrison. During this time, 16-year-old junior Emily Keyes, one of the two remaining hostages, managed to send her family a brief text message stating, "I love u guys" in response to a text message ("R U OK?") her father, John-Michael Keyes, had sent using his cell phone after receiving word that an incident was occurring at the high school. When Keyes' father sent the message "Where are you?", he received no response.

A total of 800 students from both Platte Canyon High School and the nearby Fitzsimmons Middle School were rapidly evacuated. Morrison's demands were unknown, although police confirmed that his primary concern was a request for the police to back away. All students, except the hostages, were safely evacuated by 12:10 p.m. and by 3:00 p.m. all had been taken to Deer Creek Elementary School. Parents were able to gain little information from authorities, who remained silent regarding the issue while the crisis continued.

=== Shooting ===
Deaths
1. Emily Keyes, killed by gunshot wound to the head.
2. Duane R. Morrison (gunman), committed suicide.

By the time the four student hostages were released, a bomb squad, SWAT team from Jefferson County, and agents from the Bureau of Alcohol, Tobacco, Firearms and Explosives were sent to the scene. Ambulances parked in the end zone of the high school's football field. A 4-mile (6 km) stretch of U.S. Route 285 was closed. At approximately 3:32 p.m., negotiations began to stall. Morrison later explicitly stated that he would stop negotiating at 4:00 p.m.

Wegener said that police had chosen to storm the second-floor classroom after the man ended negotiations, stating that "something would happen at 4 p.m." SWAT team members witnessed Morrison assaulting the girls, and Wegener made the decision to save the hostages by force, stating later, "My decision was either wait—[and have the] possibility of having two dead hostages or act and try to save what I feared he would do to them. ... Because I'd want whoever was in my position to do the same thing, and that is to save lives."

The police burst through the door at approximately 3:45 p.m. and encountered Morrison and the hostages behind a barricade of desks at a far wall. After using the hostages as human shields against the Jefferson County SWAT team, Morrison shot at the policemen, and then at Emily Keyes, who was trying to run. Morrison shot and critically wounded himself soon thereafter, simultaneously being shot by police, and died at the scene at 3:57 p.m. Keyes was taken by helicopter to St. Anthony's hospital in Lakewood, Colorado, a common trauma emergency unit and the first Flight For Life recipient in the United States, where she was pronounced dead at 4:32 p.m. The other hostage survived with no physical injuries. Investigators found no sign of explosives in the man's backpack, but three additional firearms were recovered outside the school campus: a Colt AR-15 rifle found in a clearing adjacent to a river about a mile north of the school, a Browning A-Bolt .270 bolt-action rifle found north of the campus near U.S. Route 285, and a Smith & Wesson Model 29 .44 Magnum revolver found south of the school near a hiking trail.

The coroner of Park County, Sharon Morris, confirmed that the body of Morrison (which had four bullet wounds, three non-fatal from police and one fatal shot from his own gun) was still in the second-floor classroom as of 6:00 p.m. An autopsy report later revealed that Morrison suffered two gunshot wounds to the head (including the fatal one fired from his gun), two additional in the right shoulder, and a graze wound to his right hand, while Emily Keyes died of a single gunshot wound to the right side of her head. District officials stated that both the high school and Fitzsimmons Middle School would be closed for September 28 and September 29; a counseling center set up at a local church would open at 7:00 a.m. for students.

== Perpetrator ==
Duane Roger Morrison (July 23, 1953 – September 27, 2006) was eventually identified as the perpetrator of the incident. He was unemployed at the time of the hostage crisis, and had no known connection to Platte Canyon High School or any of the hostages. Initial reports of the gunman described him as a bearded 53-year-old man with a camouflage backpack and a black hooded sweatshirt. Morrison had been imprisoned in 1973 for larceny and possession of marijuana, and was arrested on a separate occasion for obstructing police in Littleton, Colorado. Police announced that a suicide letter written by Morrison to a family member was being analyzed by the FBI. Morrison's family gave the letter to police, who then submitted the document to the FBI Behavioral unit in Quantico, Virginia. In the 14-page letter, Morrison claimed that he was mentally and physically abused by his father as a child, and had suicidal thoughts since he was 21 years old.

On August 15, 2006, about one month prior to the shooting, he pleaded guilty to harassment after leaving a voice message to a local Harley-Davidson dealership on November 22, 2004, after receiving a promotional catalog in his mail; the message contained profanities and a threat to visit their headquarters with an assault rifle. Prior to that, he phoned a similar threatening call. An investigation found that Morrison had purchased a motorcycle from the dealership, but became "extremely dissatisfied" after not receiving certain aftermarket accessories and services promised in his contract, and the dealership reportedly never made any attempt to resolve the dispute. His suicide letter later mentioned the purchase, in which he vaguely claimed that "the matter wasn't over". On May 31, 2005, Morrison filed a report claiming that fifteen of his firearms were stolen from his residence, and later gained $10,000 from a fictitious insurance claim initiated after the stolen firearms report. Four of the firearms mentioned in his report were among those recovered on or around the school campus; the whereabouts of the remaining 11 firearms currently remain unknown.

== Aftermath ==
Platte Canyon High School reopened a week after the shooting on October 5. Memorials were erected along the highway leading to the school that carried messages such as "Be Strong" and "Random Acts of Kindness". A number of students prayed in front of the school before the day began and students were given donated teddy bears as they left. Fifty counselors were present during the day for students. Superintendent Dr. James Walpole noted that of 460 high school students, only 10 were absent.

The service for Emily Keyes was held on September 30, the day that Governor Bill Owens later declared "Emily Keyes Day". About 5,000 motorcyclists took part in the "Columbine to Canyon Ride", which occurred in memory of the victims of both the Columbine and Platte Canyon shootings. The procession of motorcycles was so long that the first to get to Platte Canyon High School arrived as the final motorcyclists departed from Columbine High School, two riding alongside each other.

The efforts initiated toward increased school security had come to a standstill several years after the Columbine High School massacre as federal and state funding toward safety was cut in favor of higher test scores. Although an increase in communication with law enforcement was evident in the Platte Canyon High School shooting, Del Elliot of the University of Colorado noted that "[the vast majority of school districts] are so totally absorbed with CSAP and academic requirements that they aren't spending a lot of time and resources on this issue".

By October 11, investigators had conducted 124 interviews and had found 174 pieces of evidence related to the case. They were also investigating the West Nickel Mines School shooting in Pennsylvania, which had occurred five days after the shooting in Bailey. As a result of the September 27 incident, Platte Canyon High School increased its security, leaving only one school entrance unlocked. Park County Sheriff Fred Wegener proposed having a guard there during the school day, but he stated that that particular suggestion was outside the current budget.

The non-profit I Love U Guys Foundation was started in 2006 by John-Michael and Ellen Keyes. The Foundation is led by survivors, family members, first responders, and community members with a vested interest in safety, preparedness and reunification in schools. The I Love U Guys Foundation serves the lives of students, administrators, public safety experts, families, and first responders through the development and training of school and community safety and family reunification programs. The programs have been implemented by over 30,000 schools, agencies and organizations across the United States, Canada and 11 other countries. All of the programs are available at no cost.

== See also ==
- West Nickel Mines School shooting – a school shooting that occurred five days later in Pennsylvania, in which a gunman took hostages and killed five Amish schoolgirls before committing suicide. K-Y Jelly, a lubricant often used as an aid to sexual intercourse, was found in the schoolhouse among Roberts' belongings, possibly suggesting an ulterior motive for the incident.
- Weston High School shooting – a shooting that occurred only two days after the Platte Canyon High School hostage crisis
- List of school shootings in the United States by death toll
