= Glenisle =

- U.S. National Register of Historic Places
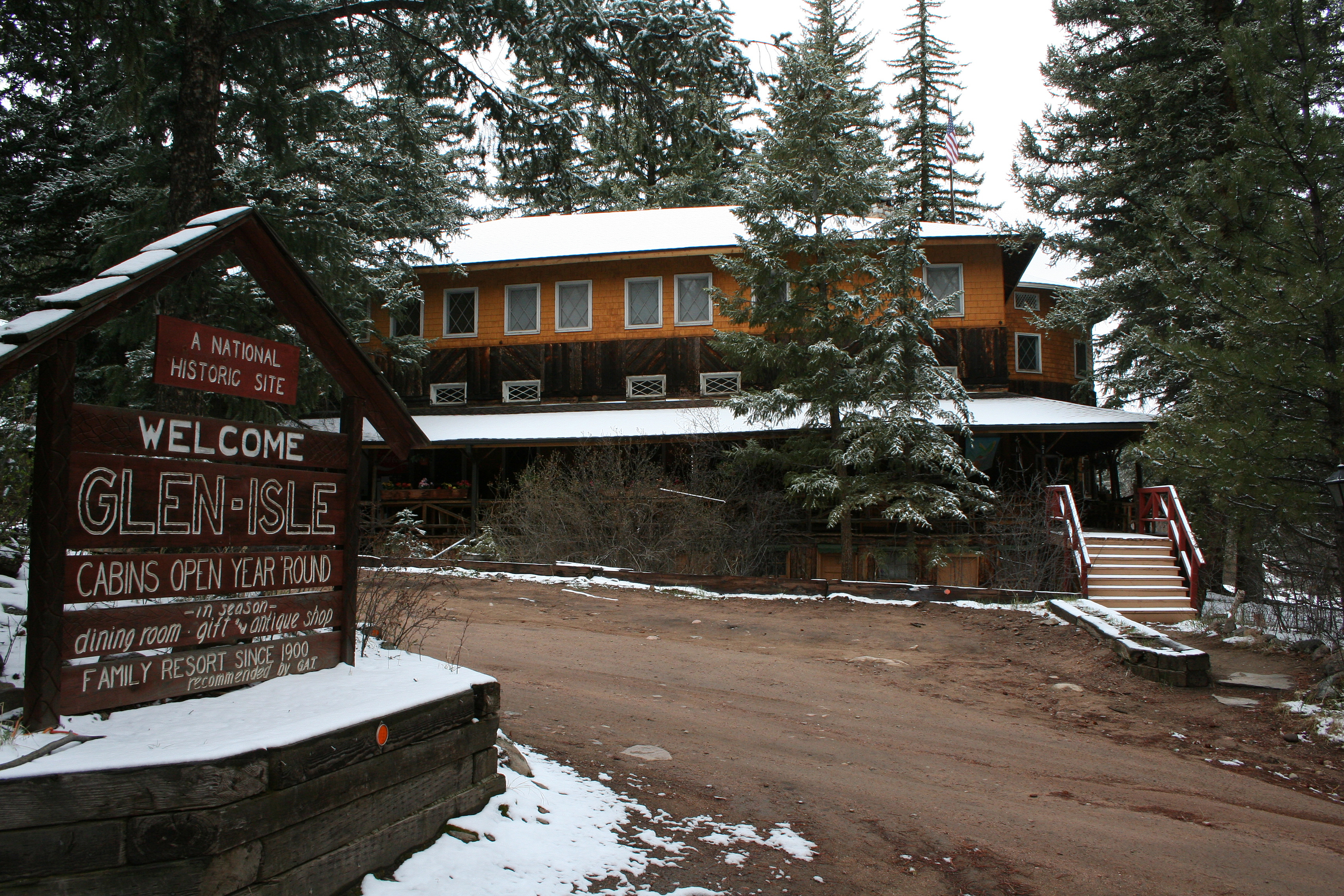
- The main lodge after a light May snow

- Location within Colorado Location within the United States
- Nearest city: Bailey, Colorado
- Coordinates: 39°24′34″N 105°30′0″W
- Built: 1901
- Architectural style: Rustic
- NRHP reference No.: 85000084
- Added to NRHP: January 18, 1985

Glenisle, also known as Glen-Isle on the Platte and Glen Isle Resort, is a rustic-style resort hotel built at the turn of the 20th century. The hotel is located just off US Highway 285 in Bailey, Colorado, United States, and has been on the National Register of Historic Places since 1985.

The rustic main lodge building's most distinctive feature is a three-story round tower with a conical roof.

It is located on the bank of the North Fork of the South Platte River. It was deemed "significant as the last remaining turn-of-the-century resort hotel in the once popular South Platte Canyon west of Denver. It was constructed as a result of the railroad building and promotion that played a significant role in development throughout Colorado in the late 19th century. Real estate promotion and tourist development became an integral part of the expansion of passenger traffic, and the Colorado & Southern invested a significant amount of capital into the Platte Canyon for just such reasons. The Adirondack inspired rustic architecture of Glenisle and its neighboring resorts was a popular theme for turn-of-the-century inns in Colorado and Glenisle remains as one of the few good intact examples of the form."
