= Erwin Jay Boydston =

United States Marine Corps Medal of Honor recipient

- Born: April 22, 1875; Bailey, Colorado Territory, US
- Died: May 19, 1957 (aged 82); Honolulu, Territory of Hawai'i, US
- Burial place: National Memorial Cemetery of the Pacific Honolulu, Territory of Hawaii
- Military career
- Allegiance: United States of America
- Branch: United States Marine Corps
- Service years: 1897–1902
- Rank: Private
- Conflicts: Boxer Rebellion
- Awards: Medal of Honor

Erwin J. Boydston (April 22, 1875 – May 19, 1957) was a private serving in the United States Marine Corps during the Boxer Rebellion who received the Medal of Honor for bravery.

== Biography ==
Boydston was born April 22, 1875, in Bailey, Colorado Territory and after entering the marine corps he was sent as a Private to China to fight in the Boxer Rebellion.

While fighting the enemy in Peking, China from July 21 – August 17, 1900 he assisted in the erection of barricades under heavy enemy fire and for his action received the Medal of Honor.

He died September 26, 1957, in Honolulu, Hawaii and is buried there in National Memorial Cemetery of the Pacific.

== Medal of Honor citation ==
Rank and organization: Private, U.S. Marine Corps. Born: 22 April 1875, Deer Creek, Colo. Accredited to: California. G.O. No.: 55, 19 July 1901. Citation:

In the presence of the enemy at Peking, China, 21 July to 17 August 1900. Under a heavy fire from the enemy during this period, Boydston assisted in the erection of barricades.

== See also ==
- List of Medal of Honor recipients
- List of Medal of Honor recipients for the Boxer Rebellion
