= Apogaea =

Coordinates: 37.122246°N 104.708269°W

- Locations: Valdez, Colorado, United States
- Inaugurated: July 16–19, 2004
- Most recent: June 9–12, 2022
- Participants: 1,750 (ticketed)
- Website: www.apogaea.com

Apogaea (meaning "far from Earth") is an annual collaborative outdoor arts and music festival held as a Colorado regional counterpart for the Burning Man event. Typically held in late spring (scheduled for June 7–10 in 2018) in southern Colorado, Apogaea ("Apo"), establishes a temporary autonomous zone where radical self-expression, inclusiveness, and self-reliance are the hallmarks of its participants.

Like the Burning Man event, Apogaea includes art installations, performance art, DJ-music, live music, camps, and theme camps. Apogaea has a Creative Grants program that provides financial assistance for artists wanting to create visual art, performances or events, workshops, art vehicles, or theme camps for Apogaea; this grant cycle generally begins in January. In past years, nearly 50% of Apogaea's operating budget was given out as creative grants. In 2009 a second grant cycle (the "Bonus Round") was added to allow projects that didn't need as much time or money to complete to receive grants. As of 2018, Apogaea is one of the most art-centric of North American Regionals with art grants for 2014 totaling $50,000.

Apogaea typically features a central "effigy" that burns on the Saturday night of the event. However, all fire at Apogaea is subject to local or regional fire bans in dry or dangerous conditions. In 2006 and 2012, Apogaea was under such a ban and had limited propane fire art and no effigy burn. Since moving to its new location in Valdez in 2016, the effigy burn has been limited to propane-fueled ignition of an effigy designed to produce no burning embers. No ember producing fire is allowed at this new site.

== Celebrations ==
Effigies at Apogaea:
2004: no effigy
2005: Buddha
2006: Phoenix (not burned due to fire ban)
2007: Phoenix
2008: Squid
2009: Volcano
2010: Communigy (integrating pieces created by individual community members)
2011: Cocoon and Butterfly
2012: Blossom (not burned due to fire ban)
2013: Blossom
2014: Throne of the Emergent Multitude
2015: Syzygy: The Library Angel (not burned due to event cancellation)
2016: Syzygy: The Library Angel
2017: Heart of Gold
2018: Big Charles
2019: Draco's Nest

2020: [canceled due to coronavirus]

2021: [canceled due to coronavirus]

2022: Fire Sculpture Garden

Temples at Apogaea:
2011: Temple of Moon
2013: Temple of Transubstantiation
2014: Temple of Infinite Life
2015: Temple of Resonance (not burned due to event cancellation)
2016: Temple of Resonance
2017: Hotaru no Hikari: The Firefly Temple
2019: Temple of Death

2020: [canceled due to coronavirus]

2021: [canceled due to coronavirus]

2022: Archways of the Ancients

Themes for Apogaea:
No themes prior to the 2008 event.
2008: Smells like Community Spirit
2009: Organized Chaos
2010: Artropolis ("Hailogaea" became the unofficial theme for the event after a hail filled weekend)
2011: Illuminate
2012: The Spiral
2013: Alchemy
2014: Emergence
2015: Synchronicity (Event was canceled)
2016: Moist
2017: Propaganda
2018: Reflection
2019: Analog
2020: Portals [canceled due to coronavirus, theme carried over to 2022]

2021: [canceled due to coronavirus]

2022: Portals

Apogaea is organized and run by an unpaid Board of Directors and a wider circle of volunteer leads ("Apogaea Ignition") in areas such as Art, Safety, Operations, Communications, Administration, Outreach, and Volunteers.

From 2008 to 2012, Apogaea ran from Thursday noon to dusk Sunday. Starting in 2013, Apo expanded to run from Wednesday through Sunday evening. Ticket prices have steadily climbed to its 2018 price of $150 online with no gate sales. 2011 was the first year that a sales cap was in place and the event sold out in mid-May. Due to its growing popularity, tickets for the event sold out in under four hours in 2012, spawning an alternate event named "Neoformia" held during the same time as Apogaea and located at Apogaea's previous location at the Happy Ass Ranch. Attendance for 2014 was capped at approximately 2,100 attendees, then in 2015 attendance was set to 2,300. Population size is capped in 2018 at 1,750.

Apogaea is an all-ages event, though minors must be accompanied by a parent or legal guardian, and those under 21 are given a different color wristband. Past attendees have organized kid-friendly camping areas with planned activities for children.

There are no free tickets given out (e.g., for volunteers, artists, or musicians), because of the philosophy that everyone attending is expected to contribute something to the event—whether it's their volunteer work, their participation, their camp, art, costumes, performance, or creativity—and Apogaea is not in a position to judge or value the merits of one person's contribution, creativity, or time over another's.

Apogaea is generally held in early June, in an attempt to hold the event late enough in the spring that it's not freezing at night that high in the mountains, yet early enough to avoid dry-season fire bans or restrictions. It also tries to avoid Father's Day weekend and being the same week as nearby regionals such as Element 11 in Utah. For 2014, Apogaea was held during the days of June 4–8.

All state and local fire-bans are strictly observed and Apogaea's volunteer leads work with county officials to implement safe and reasonable alternatives during fire bans. Any participant wishing to use fire in art, camp, or performance pieces is subject to fire-safety restrictions and is assisted and monitored by a team of volunteers trained in fire safety. In 2012, the main effigy was not burned due to a fire ban, but officials and volunteers arranged a fire parade instead. Propane flame effects were allowed as were propane burn barrels with the usual safety precautions taken.

== History ==
From 2001 to 2003, a summer festival known as Geodesika took place in the mountains of Colorado. This was not an official Burning Man-sanctioned festival, but nevertheless held to Burning Man's philosophy and tenets, and many attendees were also Burning Man attendees. After a disagreement between Geodesika's founder and other festival organizers about how the festival should be run, the latter created a group to start a new, official Burning Man regional festival, named Apogaea.

The first order of business for the new festival was to find a place to hold it. Isolation from populated areas, proximity to the Front Range of Colorado, suitability for camping for hundreds of people, cost, terrain, and altitude/nighttime temperatures were considerations in finding a place to hold Apogaea.

Another Colorado festival, Dreamtime, had private land near Paonia, Colorado, on which they'd been holding a festival, and offered the land to Apogaea. It was decided to run a joint festival in 2004, "Apogaea in Dreamtime." While successful, differences in philosophies led the organizers of both festivals to agree that a joint festival would not work in the long term.

Apogaea then found a landowner with space near Lake George, Colorado, who had hosted other festivals. The forested space, known as the Happy Ass Ranch, was the location for Apogaea for six consecutive years from 2005 to 2010. A steady annual increase in attendance presented certain challenges for the festival in terms of size and space limitations of its former home at Happy Ass Ranch. The approximately 1,100 participants in 2010, while successfully accommodated on the site, presented parking and camping challenges for the organizers of the event. In 2011, Apogaea secured a larger and more visually stunning site a few miles south in a forested area south of Bailey, Colorado. In 2015, Park County commissioners enacted a more restrictive permitting process designed to reduce the growing number of large scale events being held in and around Bailey and other towns in Park County. As a result, Apogaea was unable to secure a permit in 2015. An unofficial, smaller, event called Luminiferous, was held on private property near Granby Lake.

A vast area in southern Colorado, outside of Valdez, Colorado, was secured for Apogaea in 2016. This new location is Apogaea's current home. The Valdez location is capable of supporting art cars and bicycle travel and features a slightly more desert-like terrain although the property has several ponds and large stands of pine trees along the perimeter.

As with any other large-scale event, Apogaea has faced challenges and growing pains. Fortunately, Apogaea volunteers have worked hard to implement an organizational scheme and infrastructure to meet the demands presented by its recent spike in popularity.

For example, in 2012, parking was greatly improved with a remote parking lot serviced by a shuttle system. This opened up more acreage for the event itself and made the town of Apogaea much more visually appealing.

Also, eliminating gate sales helped to reduce the number of unprepared last-minute attendees who were drawn to the festival. The move to the larger site in 2011 also made it possible to create "neighborhoods" within Apogaea and allow large sound camps to exist in areas where their sound did not dominate the entire festival.
