= 2007 SuccessTech Academy shooting =

Mass shooting in Cleveland, Ohio

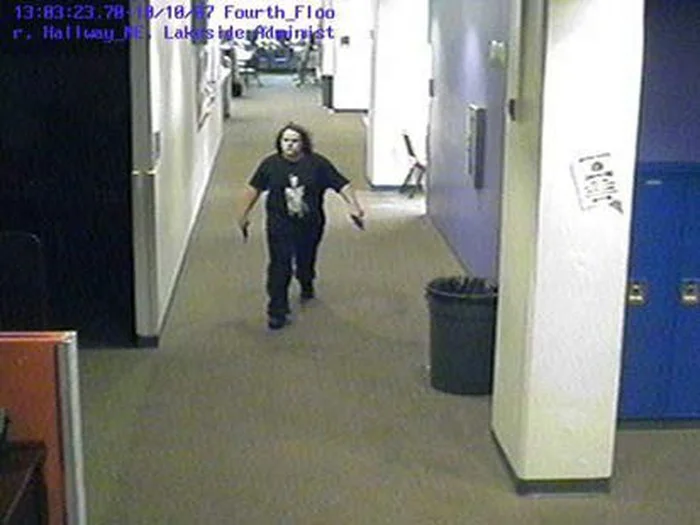
- CCTV still of Coon during the shooting
- Location: Cleveland, Ohio, U.S.
- Date: October 10, 2007; 19 years ago 1:09 p.m. (EDT; UTC−04:00)
- Target: Teachers and students at SuccessTech Academy
- Attack type: Mass shooting; school shooting
- Weapons: .22 caliber RG-10 revolver; .38 caliber Smith & Wesson Model 36 revolver; Three folding knives (unused)
- Deaths: 1 (perpetrator)
- Injuries: 5 (4 by gunfire)
- Perpetrator: Asa Hailey Coon
- Motive: Retaliation for school bullying

On October 10, 2007, a school shooting occurred at SuccessTech Academy in Cleveland, Ohio, United States. Two students and two teachers were injured on the fourth floor of the building before the perpetrator, 14-year-old freshman Asa Coon, killed himself inside of a classroom.

== Shooting ==
On October 10, 2007, Coon entered the five-story school building shortly before 1:00 p.m. EST, armed with two handguns (a .22 caliber revolver and a .38 caliber revolver), and a box of additional rounds of ammunition for each pistol; three folding knives were also in Coon's possession, which were all stocked together in a duffel bag. He dressed in a Marilyn Manson concert shirt, black jeans, and black-painted fingernails, Coon walked to the fourth floor of the building and entered the men's washroom where he loaded two revolvers.

The shooting began at 1:09 p.m. on the fourth floor of the building, after 14-year-old Michael Peek punched Coon in the face for bumping into him and shoving a gun in his face. When Peek walked away, Coon shot him in the abdomen. Another student, 17-year-old Darnell Rodgers, suffered a graze gunshot wound to the elbow in the same hallway. Michael Grassie, a social studies teacher, was shot in the chest when Coon entered his classroom. A second teacher, David Kachadourian, was shot in the back of his shoulder while in the hallway evacuating his students. During the entire shooting which lasted 1 minute and 22 seconds Coon was said to be swearing. The shooting ended when Coon entered a classroom on the fourth floor and fatally shot himself in the head.

According to police chief Michael Mcgrath, Coon had fired eight shots during the shooting.

The school was placed on a lockdown shortly after the shooting. A 14 year old girl was trampled by various students while fleeing from the school and was rushed to the hospital, and made a full recovery.

== Victims ==
Four individuals were wounded by gunfire in the shooting; two students and two teachers. The two injured teachers were treated at MetroHealth Medical Center, and the two students injured were treated at the Rainbow Babies & Children's Hospital. A 14-year-old student was also hospitalized for knee and back injuries received from being trampled in a hallway by fleeing students. One student and one teacher were discharged from the hospital later that day; the other students were released the following day. The last victim was discharged from the hospital on October 15.

== Perpetrator ==
Asa Hailey Coon (September 22, 1993 – October 10, 2007) was born in New York. He had an older brother named Stephen Coon, who had a criminal record and was released 6 weeks before the shooting. He had a twin sister named Nicole. Both twins varied differently. Nicole was outgoing, had blonde hair and played outdoors; in contrast, Asa was introverted, had long dark hair and played indoors. They had settled into Cleveland, Ohio sometime in Asa's childhood.

As children, he and Stephen physically abused their mother; this continued through until their early teens. Stephen was arrested 2 times for domestic violence by the age of 13 years old.

In February 2006, Asa, aged 12, was charged with domestic violence after he and Nicole were in an argument and, when his mom tried to break up the fight, slapped his mother and called her a vulgar name. In court, a magistrate instructed Asa's family to attend counselling sessions together, and also ordered Asa to undergo psychological testing. Asa slammed the paperwork on the ground, ran out of the room and past his mother, nearly knocking her to the ground.

He had been placed on a three-day suspension two days prior to the shooting for an altercation with another student regarding the existence of God. The day he was suspended was the same day Stephen was arrested in connection with an armed robbery. According to Coon's uncle, Larry Looney, Coon said he was upset because the teachers would not listen to what he had to say regarding the fight. According to fellow students and teachers, Coon had apparently been the target of bullying by students at the school for his Gothic appearance and eccentric behavior, and had made threats of violence in front of students and teachers the week before the shooting. Joseph Fletcher, a friend of Coon, said he had been "pushed too far" and that teachers were unable to help with his problems. Michael Grassie, who was one of Coon's teachers, said that Coon was frustrated because he was given a failing grade in his World History class, and had made attempts to goad him into a fight. Coon was suspended from school for 10 days in 2006 for attempting to harm a student.

In 1997, a social worker in Cortland County, New York, reported that three-year-old Coon was living with his family in a garbage-shrewn house, and his older brother threatened neighbors with knives, rocks, and a fake bomb. When Coon was four, his mother, Lori Looney, was convicted of neglect by the county juvenile court.

Social workers got involved again later. In 1999, Coon shot himself in the arm with his brother's BB gun, which was then turned over to the police by their mother, who did not know where the toy came from. It turned out that the toy was a gift from the boys father, Thomas Coon, who was largely not involved in the boys lives. In 2000, Coon had burn and scratch marks on him. He scratched himself because of flea bites, but he refused to say where the burn marks came from. Someone allegedly said that his brother had burned him.

Juvenile Court records show that Coon had a criminal history and mental health problems since 2005 (age 12), and threatened to commit suicide while in a mental health facility in summer 2006. For striking his mother in 2005, Coon was forced to undergo probation, counseling, and community service.

== Aftermath ==
At 2:50 p.m., 1.5 hours following the shooting, Cleveland Mayor Frank G. Jackson announced in a news conference that five people, including three students, were hurt in a shooting at the SuccessTech Academy. Four of them were shot; the students being in "stable" condition and the adults being in a more "elevated" state.

When informed of the shooting, Nicole Coon screamed and ran out of the house into the street, shouting "My brother! Oh God no."

Classes throughout the Cleveland Metropolitan School District were canceled the following two days and resumed on Monday, October 15, and classes at SuccessTech Academy did not resume until Tuesday, October 16. Cleveland's public school system established an anonymous hotline for students to report threats and dangerous behavior. The school system also announced plans to install metal detectors in all its schools and hire additional armed security guards to patrol the campuses. Schools were instructed to implement additional security precautions, to be reviewed by a professional security firm.

A crime scene photo taken of Coon after his suicide was posted on a webpage promoting Rover's Morning Glory by Cleveland disc jockey Shane French (Rover), but soon taken down. Mayor Jackson called the photo, which he did not see, "extremely inappropriate". Cleveland police officer Walter Emerick, who took the picture using his cell phone camera, was suspended from duty for eight days for sending the photo to other people, who eventually leaked it to the Internet.

== See also ==
- List of school shootings in the United States (2000s)
