= Bailey, Colorado =

Unincorporated community in Park County, CO, USA

- unincorporated community
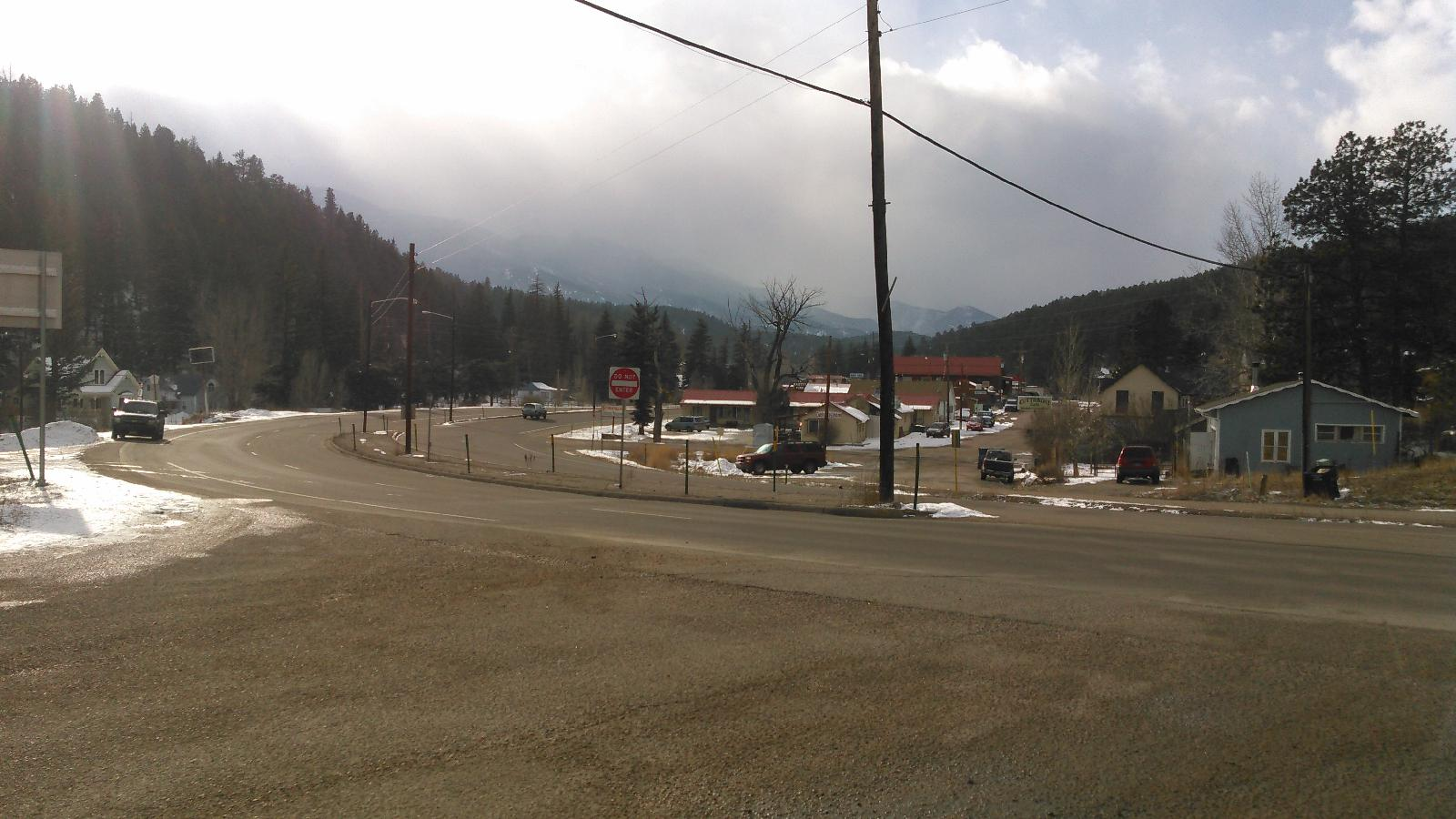
- Downtown Bailey, Colorado

- Location of Bailey, Colorado. Bailey (Colorado)
- Coordinates: 39°24′20″N 105°28′24″W
- Country: United States
- State: Colorado
- County: Park

Government
  - Type: Unincorporated community
  - Body: Park County
- Elevation: 7,740 ft (2,360 m)

Population (2020)
  - Total: 9,931
- Time zone: UTC−07:00 (MST)
  - Summer (DST): UTC−06:00 (MDT)
- ZIP Code: 80421
- Area code: 303
- GNIS pop ID: 204727

Bailey is an unincorporated community and U.S. Post Office in northeastern Park County, Colorado, United States. Bailey's Post Office ZIP Code is 80421.

The town community consists of several small businesses, restaurants and churches.

The North Fork South Platte River flows through Bailey.

== History ==
William Bailey settled a ranch and built a stage station known as Bailey's Ranch in 1864. Bailey also built a hotel at the station, and the town eventually became known as Bailey. The Denver & South Park Railroad reached Bailey in 1878, and the Bailey Post Office opened on November 20, 1878.

On March 18, 2006, the Coney Island Hot Dog Stand, a landmark building shaped like a giant hot dog was moved from Aspen Park to Bailey.

On September 27, 2006, a hostage crisis occurred after a lone gunman took seven female students hostage at a classroom in Platte Canyon High School and sexually assaulted them before opening fire after a SWAT team breached the room. One hostage was killed, while the remaining escaped uninjured. The hostage-taker then committed suicide after being shot by police.

On February 24, 2016, three Park County Sheriffs were shot, one fatally. The officers were serving an eviction to a known disgruntled man in a house.

The rustic Glen-Isle Resort in Bailey, as well as the Estabrook Historic District northeast of Bailey, are both listed on the National Register of Historic Places.

== Geography ==
Bailey is located in the mountains of Park County Colorado, approximately 30 miles (48 km) southwest of Denver along U.S. Highway 285. It is located on the east side of Kenosha Pass and is one of the largest communities in the Platte Canyon region.

=== Climate ===
Bailey has a humid continental climate (Dfb) with cold winters and warm summers.

Climate data for Bailey, Colorado, 1991–2020 normals, extremes 1901–present
Month	Jan	Feb	Mar	Apr	May	Jun	Jul	Aug	Sep	Oct	Nov	Dec	Year
Record high °F (°C)	65 (18)	70 (21)	72 (22)	78 (26)	86 (30)	95 (35)	95 (35)	93 (34)	91 (33)	83 (28)	72 (22)	67 (19)	95 (35)
Mean maximum °F (°C)	52.2 (11.2)	54.4 (12.4)	64.0 (17.8)	69.6 (20.9)	77.7 (25.4)	85.7 (29.8)	87.7 (30.9)	84.6 (29.2)	81.8 (27.7)	73.4 (23.0)	60.2 (15.7)	53.4 (11.9)	88.6 (31.4)
Mean daily maximum °F (°C)	37.5 (3.1)	39.9 (4.4)	48.3 (9.1)	53.9 (12.2)	63.1 (17.3)	74.8 (23.8)	79.4 (26.3)	76.9 (24.9)	70.9 (21.6)	58.6 (14.8)	45.1 (7.3)	37.2 (2.9)	57.1 (14.0)
Daily mean °F (°C)	23.2 (−4.9)	25.0 (−3.9)	32.9 (0.5)	38.5 (3.6)	47.0 (8.3)	56.6 (13.7)	61.9 (16.6)	59.9 (15.5)	52.8 (11.6)	41.6 (5.3)	30.5 (−0.8)	22.9 (−5.1)	41.1 (5.0)
Mean daily minimum °F (°C)	8.9 (−12.8)	10.1 (−12.2)	17.5 (−8.1)	23.1 (−4.9)	30.9 (−0.6)	38.4 (3.6)	44.4 (6.9)	42.9 (6.1)	34.8 (1.6)	24.5 (−4.2)	15.9 (−8.9)	8.7 (−12.9)	25.0 (−3.9)
Mean minimum °F (°C)	−11.6 (−24.2)	−11.6 (−24.2)	−2.1 (−18.9)	6.9 (−13.9)	19.8 (−6.8)	29.6 (−1.3)	37.4 (3.0)	35.4 (1.9)	23.8 (−4.6)	8.9 (−12.8)	−3.9 (−19.9)	−12.4 (−24.7)	−17.8 (−27.7)
Record low °F (°C)	−46 (−43)	−48 (−44)	−31 (−35)	−6 (−21)	4 (−16)	20 (−7)	28 (−2)	26 (−3)	7 (−14)	−10 (−23)	−24 (−31)	−33 (−36)	−48 (−44)
Average precipitation inches (mm)	0.52 (13)	0.65 (17)	1.38 (35)	1.98 (50)	2.03 (52)	1.62 (41)	2.71 (69)	2.52 (64)	1.43 (36)	1.11 (28)	0.69 (18)	0.57 (14)	17.21 (437)
Average snowfall inches (cm)	8.0 (20)	10.3 (26)	15.4 (39)	17.8 (45)	4.2 (11)	0.0 (0.0)	0.0 (0.0)	0.0 (0.0)	1.2 (3.0)	6.9 (18)	9.4 (24)	9.4 (24)	82.6 (210)
Average precipitation days (≥ 0.01 in)	4.1	4.9	6.6	7.4	8.3	7.3	12.0	13.1	7.0	5.0	4.2	4.3	84.2
Average snowy days (≥ 0.1 in)	4.3	5.1	6.2	5.3	1.9	0.0	0.0	0.0	0.5	2.6	3.9	4.4	34.2
Source 1: NOAA
Source 2: National Weather Service

== Arts and culture ==
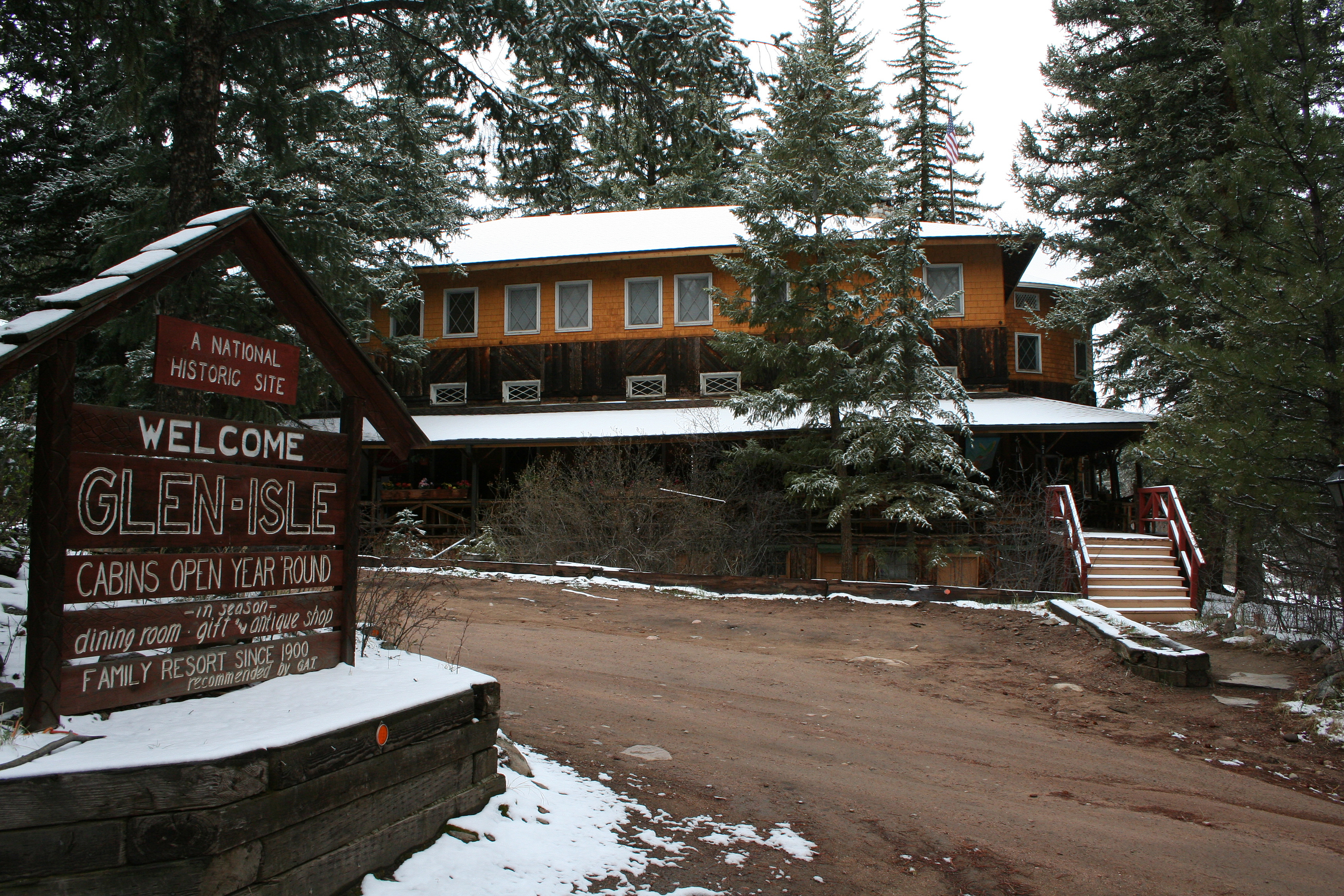
Glen-Isle Resort

Bailey Day street festival is an annual summer event in the city, featuring bands, vendors and family activities.

The Bailey HUNDO is a 100-mile endurance mountain bike race that begins and ends in Bailey. It has been an annual event since 2009, and money raised is invested in the construction of new bike trails and in youth biking initiatives in Colorado. Both the Buffalo Creek Trail System and the Colorado Trail are easily accessible from Bailey.

Tomahawk Ranch, a residential camp operated by the Girl Scouts of Colorado, is located near Bailey.

In 2004, Bailey was the location for Apogaea, an annual outdoor arts and music festival.

== Education ==
Bailey is served by the Platte Canyon School District #1.

Platte Canyon High School has approximately 300 students. In sports, they are a 3A school in the Frontier League. The Girls' Cross Country Team was the Colorado State 3A Champion in 1986, and the Girls' Track Team was the Colorado State 3A Champion in 1996 and in 2005, and the Boys' Track Team was the Colorado 3A State Champion in 2008. The Speech and Debate team holds the record for the most individual State Champions at the Festival Level.

== Notable people ==
- Erwin Jay Boydston, recipient of the Medal of Honor, America's highest military award.
- Hal Hickel, Academy Award winning visual effects animator.

== See also ==
- Denver-Aurora-Lakewood, CO Metropolitan Statistical Area
- Front Range Urban Corridor
