= Vlasenica school shooting =

2002 school shooting in Vlasenica, Bosnia and Herzegovina

- Location: Vlasenica, Bosnia and Herzegovina
- Date: 29 April 2002
- Attack type: Mass shooting, school shooting, murder-suicide
- Weapon: 7.65mm handgun
- Deaths: 2 (including the perpetrator)
- Injuries: 1
- Perpetrator: Dragomir Petkovic
- Motive: Inconclusive

On April 29, 2002, in Vlasenica, Bosnia and Herzegovina, a 17-year-old student shot and killed one professor and injured another before turning the gun on himself at Vlasenica High School. It was the first incident of its kind in the country and was one of the first modern school shootings in Europe, occurring just three days after the Erfurt school massacre. Expressing shock at the shooting, the Bosnian Serb Ministry for Education appealed to all parents and teachers in the country to teach children about violence and prevent another tragedy.

== Shooting ==
Shortly after 12 o'clock, a 17-year-old high school student approached a history professor, who was standing in front of the school, and shot him in the head with a pistol. The student then walked into a classroom, where he shot his math teacher in front of 30 students. She was seriously injured, but the injuries were not life-threatening. after he shot his math teacher, wounding her superficially on the side of the neck. The student then shot himself in the head, while the other students stampeded out of the classroom.

== Victims ==
The victims were identified as 53-year-old history teacher Stanimir Reljic, who was killed, and 50-year-old Saveta Mojsilovic, who was being treated for her wounds at a local hospital.

== Perpetrator ==
The perpetrator, 17-year-old Dragomir Petkovic, was born on 1985 in Vlasenica and was of Bosnian Serb descent. The principal described him as a "quiet and sensitive" boy.

The day before the shooting, while playing basketball, Petkovic told his best friend, 17-year-old Ognjen Markovic that Reljic, the murdered teacher, disliked him and Petkovic feared he would not give him a passing grade. Witnesses said Petkovic approached Reljic outside the school and asked him for another chance to improve his grades. When the teacher refused, he opened fire.

"According to the teachers of the school and other residents who knew him, the student who committed this murder was never perceived as a person who was capable of doing such a thing," said Ostoja Dragutinovic, the mayor of Vlasenica. "He was quiet and not such a bad student." Dragomir Zugic, the school principal, described Petkovic as "quiet and sensitive," and said the boy might have been influenced by the Erfurt school massacre.

"I'm begging my mother to forgive me, and I'm thankful to her for everything she has given me. I'm thankful to my father for all the good advice and to my older brother for the help he always gave me," The suicidal teen wrote in a letter he left behind in his room. In the note, he asked to be buried in Vlasenica and that his belongings be distributed among his six best friends. The letter concluded: "People learn from their mistakes."

== Investigation ==
In a suicide note, the student, a Serb, explained how he wanted to be buried but did not say whether he sought revenge in the attack, or whether the German killings had influenced him, the authorities said.

Bosnian Serb radio reported that the gunman, whom it identified as Dragoslav Petkovic, used a 7.65-mm handgun and that he had shot Reljic in the head and Mojsilovic in the neck. The radio report said her injuries did not appear to be life-threatening.

Police cordoned off the school with plastic tape, and students were sent home for the day.

Investigators had no motive for the shooting, the first of its kind ever in Bosnia.
