= SuccessTech Academy =

Coordinates: 41°30′26.2″N 81°41′11.4″W

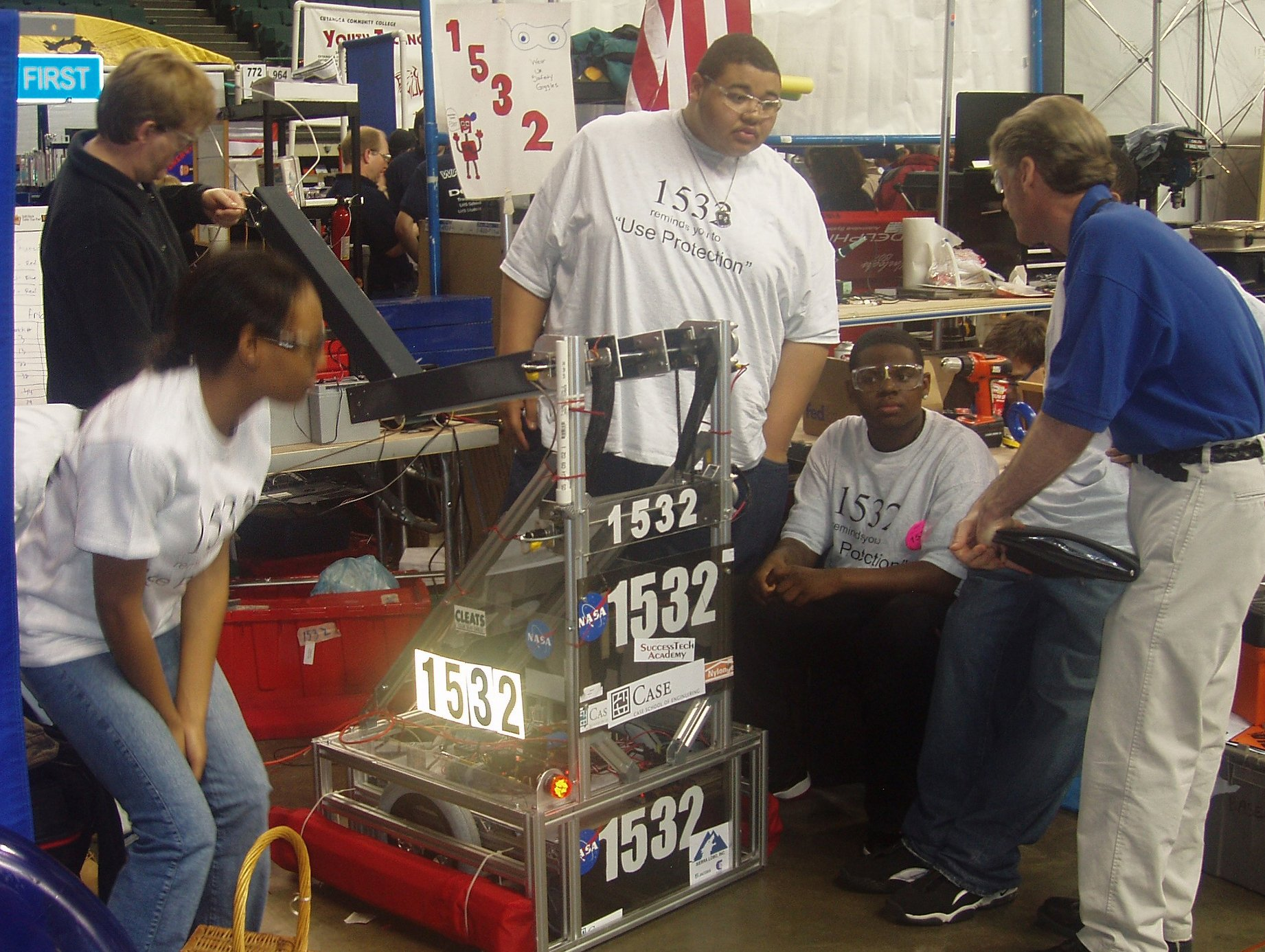
- SuccessTech Academy team fields questions at the sixth annual Buckeye Regional Robotics Competition

Location
- 1440 Lakeside Avenue; Cleveland, Ohio 44114

Information
- School type: Public, high school
- Founded: 2002
- Closed: 2017
- School district: Cleveland Metropolitan School District
- Superintendent: Eric Gordon
- Principal: Phillip Schwenk
- Staff: 30 teachers
- Grades: 9–12
- Enrollment: 270 (2010-2011)
- Language: English
- Campus: Urban
- Colors: Royal Blue and Platinum
- Mascot: Lion
- Nickname: The Royals
- Website: Website

SuccessTech Academy was an alternative public high school in downtown Cleveland, Ohio, United States. It is part of the Cleveland Metropolitan School District. A grant from the Bill & Melinda Gates Foundation helped to establish the school, which opened to enrollment in the 2002–2003 school year. SuccessTech Academy offers a technology infused high school curriculum with a focus on problem and project based learning.

All 59 students in the school's first senior class (2005-2006) were college-bound.

As of the 2009–2010 school year, SuccessTech's graduation rate was 94.9%

The school closed at the end of the 2016-2017 school year, with the campus transitioning to Davis Aerospace & Maritime High School.

== School shooting ==
A school shooting occurred on October 10, 2007. A 14-year-old student, Asa Coon, shot two teens and two faculty members at the school. According to Cleveland Division of Police, the student fatally shot himself. The student was reportedly angered over a suspension given to him earlier in the week, and school authorities confirmed he was not supposed to be at school on that day. Police said that the student had entered the school with two revolvers, one in each hand, and began firing. According to law enforcement personnel the shootings took place on the third and fourth floor when at that time the lockdown announcement, "Code Blue" was made.
