= 2006 Weston High School shooting =

School shooting in Cazenovia, Wisconsin

Coordinates: 43°28′48″N 90°11′27″W

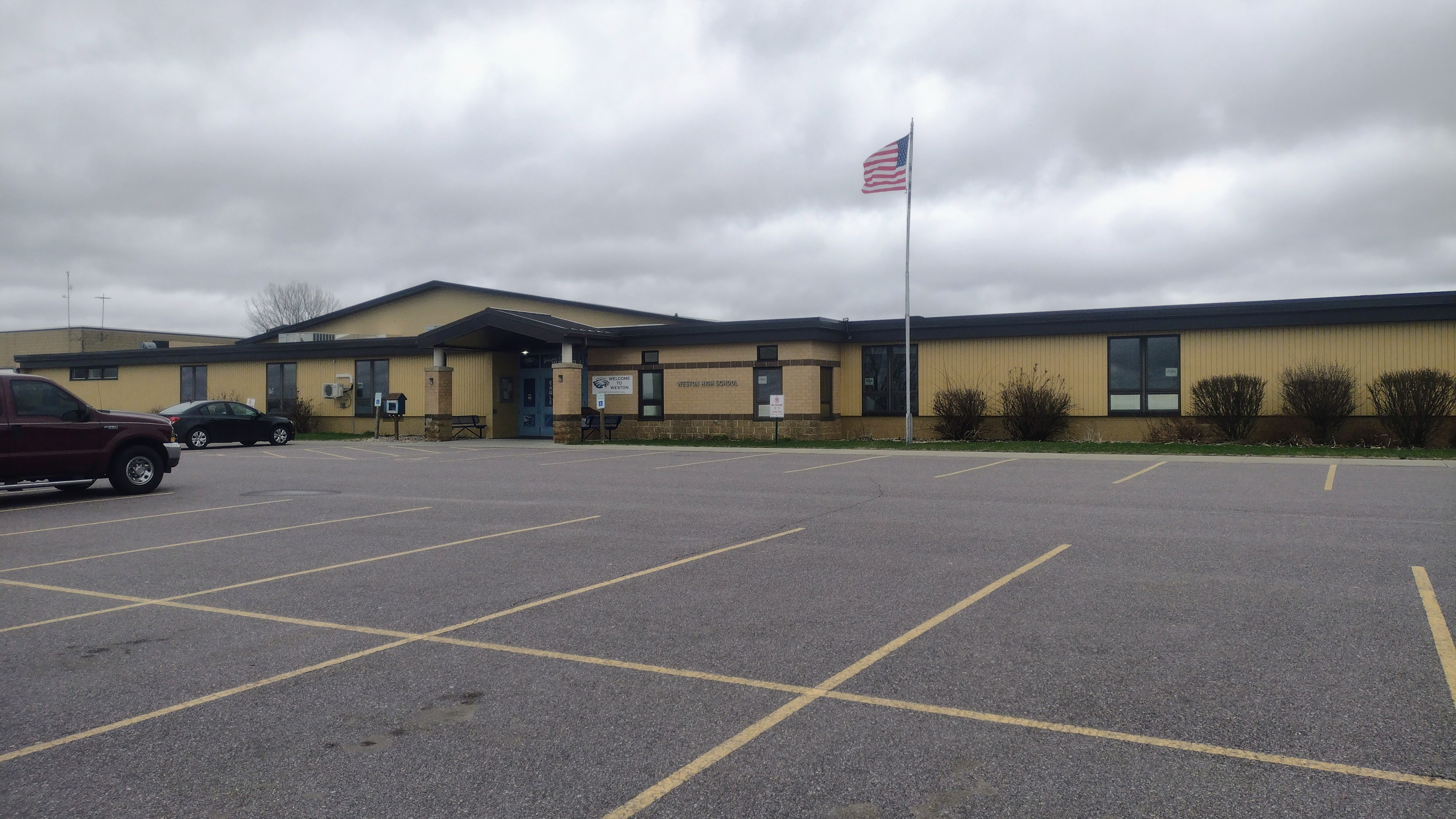
- Weston High School
- Location: Cazenovia, Wisconsin, U.S.
- Date: September 29, 2006; 8:00 a.m.
- Target: Staff at Weston High School
- Attack type: School shooting
- Weapons: .22 caliber revolver; 20-gauge shotgun
- Deaths: 1
- Perpetrator: Eric Hainstock
- Defender: John Klang (killed)
- Motive: School bullying, Columbine-inspired attack

A school shooting occurred on September 29, 2006, in Weston High School in Cazenovia, Wisconsin, United States. The perpetrator, student Eric Hainstock, entered the school's main hallway with a revolver and fatally shot principal John Klang. He is serving a life sentence and will be eligible for parole in 2037.

== Details ==
On 29 September 2006, Eric Hainstock, a 15-year-old freshman at Weston High School, entered the main hallway of the school with a .22 caliber revolver and a 20-gauge shotgun taken from his father's locked gun cabinet. Arriving at school around 8:00 a.m., he aimed the shotgun at a social studies teacher. The school custodian, Dave Thompson, wrestled the shotgun away from Hainstock. Principal John Alfred Klang then entered the hallway and confronted Hainstock, who was still armed with the handgun. Hainstock grabbed the revolver from inside his jacket and fired several shots. Klang then grabbed Hainstock, wrestled him to the ground and swept away the gun. Klang was on top of Hainstock, a pool of blood by Klang's leg. Staff and students apprehended Hainstock, holding him until the police arrived.

Klang was treated at Reedsburg Area Medical Center where he underwent surgery, and was then flown to the University of Wisconsin Hospital in Madison, where he died shortly after 3 p.m. Klang was the only one shot in the shooting. For his actions in wrestling away the gun and subduing Hainstock, Klang was posthumously awarded the Carnegie Medal by the Carnegie Hero Fund.

The high school students were initially taken to the elementary school gym, where they had the option to talk to a crisis counselor or go home. The elementary students were taken home by bus or by their parents. The homecoming events were canceled.

== Perpetrator ==
Hainstock lived with his father and stepmother in a two-story A-frame farm house about four miles northwest of Cazenovia in La Valle located on a hill surrounded by farm land. Eric Hainstock was born on April 4, 1991, in La Crosse, Wisconsin, to Shawn Hainstock and Lisa Marie Buttke. His parents divorced when he was two years old, and in December 1995 went to court to seek custody of Eric. When Hainstock was nine, his mother's parental rights were terminated by court order after she failed to pay child support.

His father remarried, and Eric was adopted by his stepmother. Hainstock's father was unemployed and received disability pensions. In September 2001, the Sauk County Department of Children and Families were called to the residence after he had allegedly kicked his son. By court-order, Eric was forced to live with his paternal grandmother, before he returned to his father's care in April 2002. In a letter he submitted to Madison newspaper Isthmus, Eric claimed he was treated like a slave by his father, having to do all of the cleaning, even having to clean past midnight. He claimed to have been severely disciplined by his father. He claimed that his father would make him stand in his bedroom corner with his nose touching a wall and holding one of his legs in the air for long periods.

At Weston High School, Eric claimed that about 25 to 30 students bullied him. When he complained to the faculty, Eric claims that nothing was done to prevent the bullying. In early 2006, Hainstock had started his fifth year at Weston High School, where he had transferred in 6th grade, after having behavior problems and relatively poor test scores at his previous school. On one occasion shortly before the shooting, Eric and his stepmother were involved in a physical confrontation, and Eric was left with human bite marks on him. After Eric shot John Klang, he told police that he had not meant to hurt him; his goal was to confront him and "make him listen" about the bullying. He reported that he was only allowed to shower once a week, which left him with poor hygiene. The clothes and shoes that his father bought for him were in poor condition and were not the right size.

It later transpired that as a student, Eric had been under medication and using prescription drugs in a bid to treat attention deficit hyperactivity disorder (ADHD). Peter Breggin, a doctor and an expert on the US drug industry, has theorized that there is a possibility that these prescription drugs could have caused imbalances in Eric, leading to him carrying out the shooting.

In prison, Michael Caldwell, a Middleton psychologist hired by Hainstock's public defenders, diagnosed Eric with ADHD, depression, and features of borderline personality disorder after having spent seven hours with Hainstock on three occasions and reviewing records of Hainstock's past. Hainstock had engaged in self-harm as a result of his negative self-image.

== Imprisonment ==
Hainstock was charged with first-degree murder by the Sauk County District Attorney's office. He was found guilty on August 2, 2007, and sentenced to life imprisonment. He will be eligible for parole in 2037 when he is 46 years old.

Hainstock is currently serving his sentence at Oshkosh Correctional Institution after previously being incarcerated at the Green Bay Correctional Institution in Green Bay, Wisconsin. While in prison, he has allowed Isthmus to share his story. He has written a ten-page letter with the help of his cellmate. According to Hainstock, he has gained 50 pounds, his reading went from a fourth-grade level to a tenth-grade level, and he is working on his GED. Hainstock's father and stepmother Priscilla visit him about every month. In his letter, Hainstock takes responsibility for what he did, but he believes that he is not to blame for everything. In October 2008, Hainstock's supportive cellmate at Green Bay was reassigned without any official explanation.

While imprisoned, Hainstock wrote his own cookbook, "The Wisconsin Prison Cookbook: 33 Step-by-Step Recipes to Free Your Taste Buds", which was published on November 11, 2019, by Winding Hall Publishers.

Eric's father, Shawn, died March 1, 2023, in Lavalle, Wisconsin.

== See also ==
- List of homicides in Wisconsin
- List of school shootings in the United States by death toll
- List of school shootings in the United States
