= Platte Canyon High School =

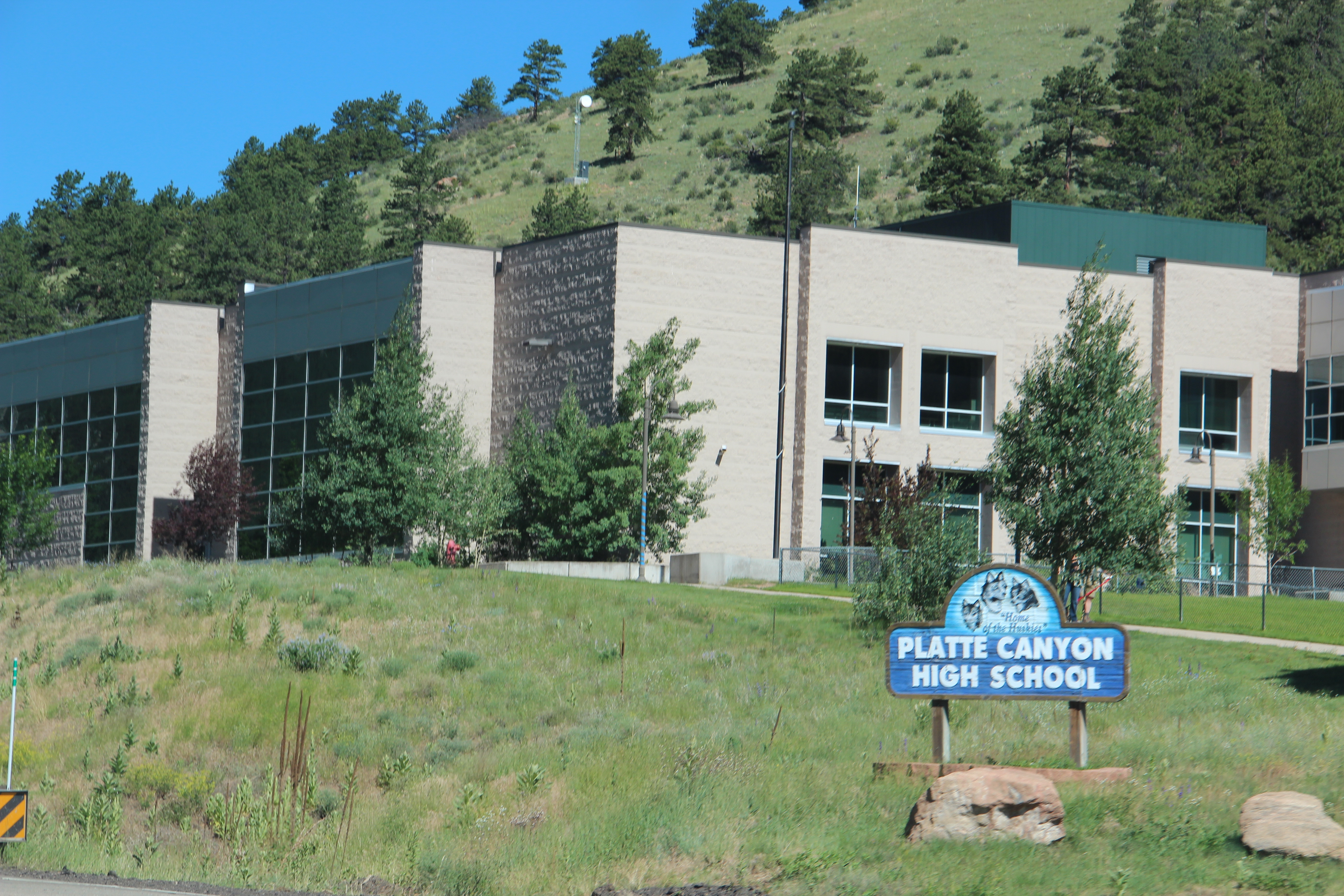
- View of the school from U.S. Highway 285

Location
- 57243 U.S. Highway 285; Bailey, Colorado 80421; United States; 39°25′16″N 105°32′09″W

Information
- School type: Public high school
- Established: 1957; 69 years ago
- School district: Platte Canyon 1
- CEEB code: 060075
- NCES School ID: 080237000087
- Principal: Mike Schmidt
- Teaching staff: 16.45 (on an FTE basis)
- Grades: 9–12
- Enrollment: 224 (2023–2024)
- Student to teacher ratio: 13.62
- Colors: Royal blue and silver
- Athletics conference: CHSAA
- Mascot: Husky
- Feeder schools: Fitzsimmons Middle School
- Website: pchs.plattecanyonschools.org

Platte Canyon High School, located in Bailey, Colorado, United States, was founded in 1957. The school building is located on Highway 285 in Park County.

== Athletics ==
Platte Canyon High School is a member of the Colorado High School Activities Association (CHSAA) and the Frontier League. The Platte Canyon Huskies participate in 2A football (Colorado Conference) and 3A Frontier League basketball, baseball, cheer, cross country, speech and debate, softball, track & field, volleyball, wrestling, along with 4A Inter-League girls' swimming and 5A State League alpine skiing.

== 2006 hostage crisis ==
On September 27, 2006, a "hostage situation" was reported at 11:40 a.m. local time (1740 UTC) at the high school. Duane Roger Morrison, 53, of Denver, reportedly said that he had a bomb. Morrison took six female students as hostages in a second-floor room and released four of them while keeping the other two. Once SWAT members approached, one of the female hostages, identified as 16-year-old Emily Keyes, was shot and critically wounded. She was taken away by a helicopter, and was later declared dead from her injuries. Morrison then shot and killed himself. The other female was not wounded.
