= List of attacks related to secondary schools (2020s) =

This is a list of attacks related to secondary schools in the 2020s that have occurred around the world. These are attacks that have occurred on school property or related primarily to school issues or events.

A narrow definition of the word attacks is used for this list so as to exclude:

1. Incidents that occurred as a result of warfare, robberies, gang violence, public attacks (as in political protests)
2. Accidental shootings
3. Murder–suicides by rejected suitors or estranged spouses
4. Suicides or suicide attempts involving only one person.
5. Incidents involving only school staff, belongs at List of workplace killings
6. Events where no injuries take place
7. A foiled attack, belongs at List of unsuccessful attacks related to schools
8. Attacks that took place at colleges, belongs at List of attacks related to post-secondary schools

The listed attacks include shootings, stabbings, slashings, bombings, and beatings administered with blunt instruments.

== 2020s ==
| Date | Location | Attacker(s) | Dead (Note: Including death or injury of attacker(s), when applicable.) | Injured | Description |
|---|---|---|---|---|---|
| January 10, 2020 | Torreon, Coahuila, Mexico | Jose Angel Ramos Betts | 2 dead (including the perpetrator) | 6 injured | Colegio Cervantes shooting: An 11-year-old student used two guns to shoot two teachers and three students, killing one teacher and himself. The school periodically participates in Operativo Mochila (Operation Backpack), and it is unclear how he got the guns into the school. The newspaper El Universal reported that the shooter was influenced by a video game and had stated on a Facebook group that he wanted to duplicate the 2017 Monterrey school shooting. He was dressed in a white T-shirt and suspenders, reminiscent of Eric Harris in the Columbine High School massacre. |
| January 11, 2020 | Dallas, Texas | | 1 dead | 1 injured | A 15-year-old has been arrested after two people were wounded by gunfire during a fight at a high school basketball game between South Oak Cliff and Kimball High School. An 18-year-old man was badly wounded in the shooting, and a Dallas ISD police officer was grazed by a bullet fragment. The 15-year-old suspect, who turned himself in at Dallas police headquarters, was initially charged with aggravated assault; however, after the 18-year-old student died from his injuries, the suspect was charged with murder. |
| January 14, 2020 | Bellaire, Texas | | 1 dead | | A 19-year-old student was shot in the chest and killed at Bellaire High School. A 16-year-old student was arrested and charged with manslaughter. |
| January 23, 2020 | Tampere, Finland | Unnamed student | | 1 injured | A student stabbed another student with a knife around 8 a.m. |
| February 6, 2020 | Brisbane, Australia | 14-year-old male student | | 1 injured | A 12-year-old student was taken to hospital in a serious condition with abdominal injuries after a stabbing at Rosewood State High School, west of Brisbane. Authorities said three male students were involved in the incident – one being the main participant – which happened shortly after 11:30 a.m., and the school was placed on lockdown. Officers said the 14-year-old boy fled the scene when the school was placed on lockdown. He was arrested shortly after on a nearby street. |
| March 2, 2020 | Comodoro Rivadavia, Argentina | 16-year-old male student | | 1 injured | In the middle of a fight that took place inside the school's bathroom, a 16-year-old student was injured by a knife. The aggressor is a classmate, who after an argument, began to fight with the boy, attacking him with a knife and wounding him in the abdominal area. The attacker, also 16 years old, was arrested. |
| September 29, 2020 | Zielona Góra, Poland | 17-year-old Kinga Herbut | | 3 injured | A 17-year-old second-grade student, Kinga Herbut, arrived in the morning at the Krzysztof Kieślowski Fifth General Secondary School with two kitchen knives. She first went to the school psychologist after concerned students reported her earlier online posts to teachers. Herbut stated that the posts were not serious, but when she was left alone with the psychologist, she ran out of the office and went to her classroom. There, she took out the knives and injured three students. One girl was wounded in the temple, another in the forearm, and a third suffered a cut to the eyebrow. She then ran to another classroom, but one of the students threw a chair at her. She fled and went to another room, where students barricaded themselves inside. She was eventually restrained by teachers and taken to a psychiatric hospital. The reported motive was bullying by her peers, and Herbut was described as a withdrawn student. |
| October 13, 2020 | Rehoboth, Namibia | 13-year-old male student | 1 dead | | A 13-year-old third grader in Namibia stabbed his supposed enemy with a kitchen knife in the left side of the chest. The 15-year-old boy, Ivan Prince Zamuee died in hospital. To date, the motive for this attack is unknown. |
| January 13, 2021 | Reykjavík, Iceland | Several | | 6 injured | Six students were assaulted with a baseball bat and knives. |
| February 11, 2021 | Osh, Kyrgyzstan | 16-year-old male student | 1 dead | 1 injured | A 10th grade student at Nariman High School in the city of Osh died in hospital without regaining consciousness after being stabbed with a knife. Two students were admitted to the Osh Regional Hospital with stab wounds at 14:10. One of them, a 16-year-old boy, died in hospital. Another student is in serious condition. |
| April 12, 2021 | Knoxville, Tennessee | Anthony J. Thompson Jr. | 1 dead | 1 injured | A 17-year-old student shot and injured a school resource officer before being fatally shot by police. |
| April 13, 2021 | Monrovia, Liberia | Jovanus Oliver Turay, 16 | 1 dead | | Jovanus Oliver Turay, 16, the son of a well-known Liberian actor and film producer, Sylvanus Turay, brought a 9mm pistol to his secondary school, the Cyber-Ed Christian School of Excellence, and fatally shot his 14-year-old classmate, who was also the daughter of a teacher. He was arrested after the shooting. |
| May 11, 2021 | Kazan, Russia | Ilnaz Rinatovich Galyaviev, 19 | 9 dead | 23 injured | Kazan school shooting: A 19-year-old Ilnaz Galyaviev, who got expelled from his college, attacked his former school. He killed two teachers and seven 8th-grade students. Before the shooting he created his Telegram channel called "God" and made some posts where he wrote that he is god and other people are his slaves. On the day of the massacre, he posted a photo of himself in a mask, captioned "Today I'm going to kill a huge amount of biowaste and shoot myself too". |
| July 19, 2021 | Boon Lay, Singapore | 16-year-old student | 1 dead | | River Valley High School attack: A sixteen-year-old male student was charged with murder with an axe of a 13-year-old fellow male student inside a toilet, and was arrested shortly after the incident. |
| August 19, 2021 | Eslöv, Sweden | 15-year-old student | | 1 injured | Eslöv school stabbing: 1 teacher was injured in a stabbing committed by a 15-year-old student who livestreamed the attack on Twitch with his phone that was attached to a helmet he was wearing alongside a combat vest and helmet, similar to that worn by Brenton Tarrant, who he had quoted in his manifesto. A 15-year-old was arrested after attempting a suicide by cop with a fake handgun. |
| September 22, 2021 | Fremont, California | Two youth | | 1 injured | A 15-year-old student was stabbed in John F. Kennedy High School by two youth ages 16 and 17. The victim notified Fremont Police Department that he had been stabbed in the neck and the suspect was nearby. A 16-year-old from John F. Kennedy was booked on attempted murder charges, while a 17-year-old suspected to be a student at neighboring Irvington High School was booked on suspicion of brandishing a weapon. The victim has been released from the hospital with non-life-threatening injuries. |
| November 1, 2021 | Willetton, Western Australia, Australia | 14-year-old female student | | 1 injured | A 14-year-old female student stabbed a 55-year-old female teacher at Willetton Senior High School with the use of a 25-centimetre kitchen knife brought to school by her accomplice, a 13-year-old female student. The 13-year-old hid the knife in her backpack before passing it to the 14-year-old, due to the 14-year-old being subject to regular baggage checks. Over the course of several weeks before the incident, the pair had discussed their plans on Discord to murder the teacher by severing an artery below the armpit, as well as plans to burn down the school. The teacher only suffered a 1-centimetre wound in her left armpit because she turned around right as the attack took place. On 5 May 2022, the 14-year-old pleaded guilty to a charge of attempted murder, whilst the 13-year-old pleaded not guilty to the same charge. |
| November 8, 2021 | Ezzahra, Tunisia | 17-year-old student | | 1 injured | A high school teacher was stabbed by a 17-year-old student in a classroom. The incident caused panic among students and school staff who had to evacuate the school. When the student, who was arrested shortly after, stabbed him, the knife he used broke. |
| November 16, 2021 | Loures, Portugal | Multiple gunmen | | 1 injured | A drill band was invited to perform at the Escola Secundária José Cardoso Pires. Another group of the same musical style of around 10 elements, and rival of the first group, knowing that they were going to perform at the school, went to the place and tried to enter the school. They were denied entry, causing them to start to shoot and throw glass bottles through the school bars. A 16-year-old who was performing with his band on the school was shot in the knee and was transported by firefighters to the Beatriz Ângelo hospital, where he received treatment for his injuries. The shooters dispersed and the PSP is actively searching for them. |
| November 17, 2021 | Toronto, Ontario, Canada | Ahmed Rafin, 19 | 1 dead | 2 injured | 15-year-old Maahir Dosani was stabbed to death in an unprovoked altercation outside of Victoria Park Collegiate Institute in Toronto, with two other students, both 14 and 16, sustaining non-life-threatening injuries. |
| January 10, 2022 | Kristianstad, Sweden | 16-year-old student | | 2 injured | Kristianstad school attack: A 16-year-old arrived at school on the first day after winter break armed with four knives and the intent of perpetrating a stabbing on students and teachers. Dressed in all black, combat gloves and a face mask, he proceeds into the school just minutes after the first class has begun while playing "Don't Stop Me Now" by Queen on a loudspeaker tied to his belt. He enters a classroom and proceeds to attack his teacher and a 16-year-old student. The pupils escape the classroom, and when left alone, the boy turns off his speaker, stabs the knives into a desk and proceeds to call the emergency hotline. Also, the student had accidentally stabbed himself in the pinky finger. On his computer, police found dozens of searches of other mass attacks and a manifesto he had written. He was charged with three attempts of murder and two grossly unlawful threats. He was sentenced to three years in a youth detention centre. |
| February 22, 2022 | São Paulo, Brazil | 16-year-old male student | | 1 injured | A 16-year-old student stabbed the principal in the abdomen, arm and leg as she opened the school gate. Students who were on the scene helped the principal. The student fled the school and was injured after the attack, but was rescued and later arrested. |
| March 21, 2022 | Malmö, Sweden | Fabian Cederholm | 2 dead | | Malmö school stabbing: 18-year-old Fabian Cederholm determined to commit suicide entered Malmö Latin school after school hours and murdered two teachers with an axe and a knife. He is the youngest person in modern times to be sentenced to life in prison in Sweden. |
| March 31, 2022 | Prague, Czech Republic | Jaroslav Řehák, 19 | 1 dead | | 19-year-old student of Ohradní Vocational High School attacked his Physics teacher in the school office with a machete, killing him. |
| April 12, 2022 | Rovaniemi, Finland | Unnamed student | | 1 injured | A student stabbed another student with a knife in the school cafeteria. |
| April 12, 2022 | Hinoba-an, Philippines | 56-year-old male principal Warren Escosar | 3 dead | 0 injured | The school principal of Bilbao Uybico NHS fatally fired at a teacher and her husband early in the morning, then committing suicide via gunshot in his vehicle soon after. |
| April 13, 2022 | Warsaw, Poland | 59-year-old school counselor | | 0 injured | A 59-year-old school counselor came to the Aviation Technical School No. 9 named after the Heroes of Narvik in Warsaw with an axe. A few minutes before 12:00, an argument occurred between the counselor and a teacher. The 59-year-old then took out the axe and struck a door with it. No one was injured or killed. The motive was threats and an earlier argument. |
| April 25, 2022 | Mississauga, Ontario, Canada | 15-year-old, unidentified | | 2 injured | Three students were stabbed following a fight at the sports field of St. Marcellinus Secondary School. Circumstances leading up to the altercation that ensued are unclear. |
| May 6, 2022 | Isla del Gobernador, Rio de Janeiro, Brazil | 14-year-old male student | | 3 injured | Three 14-year-old students suffered minor injuries after being stabbed by another 14-year-old student at the Brigadeiro Eduardo Gomes Municipal School, in Ilha do Governador. Before the attack, the teenager took his cell phone and began filming the assaults. A teacher used a chair to try to stop the student from attacking his classmates, but the boy injured the other two classmates. He was only restrained later. |
| May 16, 2022 | Guidan Alami, Tahoua region, Niger | Male student | 1 dead | | A CM2 student, aged between 10 and 12, fatally stabs his teacher, Moussa Issoufou Dan Kandé, with a knife for not removing his chains around his neck and arms and other disagreements with him. |
| June 8, 2022 | David, Panama | 15-year-old male student | | 1 injured | A 15-year-old student at the Arnulfo Arias Madrid Professional and Technical Institute was stabbed by a classmate at the school located in the David Sur district, in the province of Chiriquí. According to initial investigations, the victim, who is in ninth grade, suffered a cut on the left side of his chest while defending a first-year student. Police units for Children and Adolescents attended the scene and began the investigation. |
| August 29, 2022 | New South Wales, Australia | 15-year-old female student | | 1 injured | 1 teenage student suffered stab wounds to her chest and arm. The 15-year-old perpetrator was arrested at the scene. |
| September 26, 2022 | Izhevsk, Russia | Artyom Igorevich Kazantsev, 34 | 19 dead (including the perpetrator) | 23 injured | Izhevsk school shooting: A 34-year-old man with mental illness entered school No. 88, where he killed 11 students aged 7 to 15 and 7 school staff members, before killing himself. |
| September 26, 2022 | Bahia, Brazil | 14-year-old student | 1 dead | 1 injured | On September 26, 2022, an unnamed 14-year-old killed a disabled 19-year-old female student, whom he did not know, with a machete at Colégio Municipal Eurides Sant’Anna, in Bahia, Brazil. He entered the school with his father's .38 caliber revolver, a machete and a homemade bomb. He was shot four times by law enforcement at the scene and transported to a hospital. |
| October 24, 2022 | St. Louis, Missouri | Orlando Harris, 19 | 3 dead | 7 injured | 2022 Central Visual and Performing Arts High School shooting: 19-year-old man entered the Central Visual and Performing Arts High School just after 9 am. At least seven people were injured and three were killed, including the gunman. |
| November 3, 2022 | Nováky, Slovakia | Alex B., 16 | | 2 injured | A 16-year-old student of Nováky High School attacked his classmates during a lesson with an axe. He injured 2 of them before being arrested and charged for attempted murder. |
| December 7, 2022 | Oakland, California | 15-year-old, unidentified | | 1 injured | A 14-year-old was stabbed at Skyline High School around 11:30 AM. |
| January 25, 2023 | Koror, Palau | Male student | | 1 injured | On the campus of Palau High School, a ninth-grade student stabbed a tenth-grade student with a pair of scissors, and the injured student had to be taken to the hospital for treatment. A video was recorded at the time of the incident. |
| February 9, 2023 | Saint Paul, Minnesota, USA | 16-year-old male student | 1 dead | | A 15-year-old male student was stabbed at Harding High School in St. Paul, Minnesota. |
| February 13, 2023 | Petropavlosk, Kazakhstan | David Jakeladze, 15 | | 3 injured | A 15-year-old student wearing a white mask, carrying a knife and an axe, wounded three students: two 10th-graders and one 9th-grader. One of them suffered head injuries. The perpetrator was detained by police shortly after the attack. |
| February 21, 2023 | Palm Coast, Florida, USA | 17-year-old male student | | 1 injured | A 17-year-old male student repeatedly punched and kicked a teacher at Matanzas High School in Palm Coast, Florida, knocking the teacher unconscious and leaving her critically wounded. The student was arrested and is expected to face charges of battery and attempted murder as an adult. |
| March 8, 2023 | Vesala, Finland | 13-year-old female student | | 1 injured | A 13-year-old female student stabbed a male student in the abdomen. |
| March 9, 2023 | St. John's, Newfoundland | 3 students | | 1 injured | victim sent to hospital with serious injuries. |
| March 27, 2023 | São Paulo, Brazil | 13-year-old male student | 1 dead | 4 injured | A 71-year-old teacher was stabbed and killed. The 13-year-old perpetrator also injured three other teachers and a student before being stopped by two nearby teachers. |
| March 28, 2023 | Ylivieska, Finland | 16-year-old male student | | 1 injured | A ninth-grader stabbed another ninth grade student in the back at Kaisaniemi school. |
| April 10, 2023 | Manaus, Brazil | 12-year-old male | | 3 injured | A 12-year-old male stabbed and wounded three people at Colégio Adventista de Manaus in Manaus, Brazil. |
| April 11, 2023 | Santa Tereza de Goiás, Brazil | 13-year-old male student | | 3 injured | A 13-year-old male student stabbed and wounded three people at Colégio Estadual Doutor Marco Aurélio in Santa Tereza de Goiás, Brazil. |
| May 3, 2023 | Vällingby, Sweden | Male, 18 | | 2 injured | An 18-year-old man entered Grimstaskolan carrying a knife and a gun-like object. He wounded two school employees before being subdued and arrested. |
| May 4, 2023 | Kurram District, Khyber Pakhtunkhwa Province, Pakistan | Multiple gunmen | 7 dead | | Gunmen stormed the school and killed seven teachers; another teacher from the school was killed earlier in the day in a separate attack. The victims were believed to be members of Pakistan's minority Shia community. |
| May 30, 2023 | Independencia, Guaira, Paraguay | 16-year-old male student | 1 dead | | School principal Sofía Rodríguez de Cristaldo was rushed by a student who inflicted fatal stab wounds before fleeing. |
| June 12, 2023 | San Fernando, Andalusia, Spain | 15-year-old male student | | 1 injured | A 15-year-old boy was stabbed in the leg with a pair of scissors by a 13-year-old pupil. Witnesses say that after several arguments, they got into a fight which ended with the boy being stabbed. |
| July 25, 2023 | Pereira, Colombia | Male student | 1 dead | | Two teenagers were arguing inside a football school in Pereira, probably due to problems arising from a romantic relationship and personal issues that had occurred several months ago, and one of them was fatally stabbed by another classmate. The attacker was arrested. |
| August 4, 2023 | Daejeon, South Korea | Male in his 20s | | 1 injured | A man stabbed a teacher at Songchon High School before fleeing the scene. |
| August 17, 2023 | San Jose, California USA | unknown suspects | | 2 injured | 2 students were stabbed after fighting at a brawl in an outdoor basketball court at James Lick High School, the suspects fled before police arrived |
| August 31, 2023 | Clearwater, Florida USA | 14-year-old Honor Walker | | 2 injured | A ninth grader who has a manifesto with serial killers, allegedly stabbed 2 students at Countryside High School. The suspect has been charged with attempted murder. The Incident occurred days after Hurricane Idalia made impact in the area. |
| September 11, 2023 | Krasniy Desant, Russia | 15-year-old male student | | 4 injured | A ninth grader stabbed three adults with a knife and slightly injured himself during the arrest. |
| September 28, 2023 | Jerez de la Frontera, Spain | 14-year-old male student | | 5 injured | Jerez de la Frontera school stabbing: A 14-year-old student armed with two knives stabbed at least five persons at Elena García Armada Institute before being detained. |
| October 13, 2023 | Arras, France | Mohamed Mogouchkov, 20 | 1 dead | 3 injured | Arras school stabbing: A 20-year-old former pupil Mohamed Mogouchkov stabbed a teacher to death and wounded three others at Gambetta-Carnot high school before being arrested. |
| October 17, 2023 | Izhevsk, Russia | 14-year-old male student | | 1 injured | At school No. 50, a 14-year-old student attacked a classmate with a knife and stabbed him three times, as a result of which he was hospitalized. The attacker was registered with a diagnosis of schizophrenia. |
| October 23, 2023 | Sapopemba, São Paulo, Brazil | 16-year-old male student | 1 dead | 3 injured | Sapopemba State School shooting: A 16-year-old pupil shot and killed a female student and injured three more female students before being arrested by police. |
| November 1, 2023 | Los Angeles, California, USA | Unnamed students | | 5 injured | Van Nuys High School stabbing: A fight left five people injured, including two stabbed. |
| November 28, 2023 | Raleigh, North Carolina, U.S. | 14-year-old male student | 1 dead | 1 injured | A 14-year-old student at Southeast Raleigh Magnet High School in Raleigh, North Carolina fatally stabbed a 15-year-old student and injured a 16-year-old student before being taken into custody and charged with murder. |
| November 29, 2023 | Kadzidło, Poland | Albert Gut, 18 | | 4 injured (including the perpetrator) | Albert Gut, 18, stormed into a classroom and attacked his classmates. One female student was injured in the stomach and a boy in the neck. They were transported by air ambulance to hospital. Outside the school, the teenager injured a third person, who was also later hospitalised, with minor injuries to an arm. After the attack, Ostrołęka police officers, assisted by a sniffer dog, detained the attacker near a sports stadium in Kadzidło as he attempted to commit suicide. An ambulance was called to the scene. |
| December 5, 2023 | Austin, Texas, U.S. | Shane Matthew James Jr. | | 1 injured | A resource officer was shot on the leg outside of Northeast Early College High School, making the school go into a lockdown. The shooting was part of a shooting spree throughout Austin and Bexar County. |
| December 7, 2023 | Bryansk, Russia | Alina Dmitrievna Afanaskina, 14 | 2 dead (including the perpetrator) | 5 injured | Bryansk school shooting: A 14-year-old girl fatally shot a student and injured five other people in Gymnasium No. 5 of Bryansk School before shooting herself. |
| December 25, 2023 | New Taipei City, Taiwan | Student surnamed Guo | 1 dead | | 2023 New Taipei City junior high school stabbing: A ninth-grade student, attacked a ninth-grade student surnamed Yang from a neighboring class with a switchblade. Yang was stabbed ten times and later died from his injuries. |
| January 4, 2024 | Perry, Iowa, U.S. | Dylan Butler, 17 | 3 dead (including the perpetrator) | 6 injured | Perry High School shooting: A 17-year-old student shot and killed two people and injured six others before committing suicide. |
| January 10, 2024 | Liminka, Finland | Male student | | 1 injured | A student slightly wounded another student with a knife at Liminganlahti school. |
| January 29, 2024 | Suan Luang district, Thailand | 14-year-old male student | 1 dead | 0 injured | A 14-year-old student with special needs stabbed a schoolmate to death during morning assembly at Narknarwaouptump School. The attacker told police his victim had bullied him for weeks. |
| February 6, 2024 | Milan, Italy | David T., 15 | | 1 injured | A 15-year-old Italian boy was stabbed by an 18-year-old boy after school. It all happened in the early afternoon of Tuesday 6 February at the Pieve Emanuele vocational school in the southern hinterland of Milan. The attacker, David T., was arrested by the police, while the victim was rushed to Humanitas. His life was not in danger. |
| February 12, 2024 | Manchester, New Hampshire | Male student | | 1 injured | Two male students got into an argument at Manchester Memorial High School. One student stabbed the other before he was arrested. . |
| February 22, 2024 | Wuppertal, Germany | 17-year-old male student | | 5 injured | A student stabbed and wounded four people at Wilhelm-Dörpfeld-Gymnasium before attempting suicide and being arrested. |
| March 26, 2024 | Athens, Greece | 19-year-old male | | 2 injured | A 19-year-old male attacked an 18-year-old student with a hammer before stabbing the school's headmaster at the 41st Lyceum-Gymnasium of Athens in Patisia. |
| April 2, 2024 | Vantaa, Finland | 12-year-old student | 1 dead | 2 injured | Viertola school shooting: 12-year-old student shot three 12-year-old students. One of the victims died and two were seriously injured. |
| April 24, 2024 | Ammanford, Wales, United Kingdom | 13-year-old female student | | 3 injured | A teenage girl stabbed a student and two teachers before being arrested. She was later found guilty of attempted murder. |
| May 1, 2024 | Sheffield, England, United Kingdom | Louis Melotte, 17 | | 3 injured | A 17-year-old student at the Birley Academy attacked a 12-year-old student and two staff members using pieces of broken glass in the school's reception area before being tackled and later arrested. He claimed that the attack was a "calling from the Lord Jesus Christ" in a series of social media posts before the attack. |
| May 6, 2024 | Łomża, Poland | unknown student, 16 | | 1 injured | On the 99th anniversary of the tragedy at the Vilnius Gymnasium, a 16-year-old student of the Mechanical and General Secondary School No. 5 in Łomża came to school carrying a 4.5 mm air gun. During the teacher's absence from the classroom, he took out the weapon and fired two shots at the door and the blackboard. He then fired two more shots through a window, hitting a 15-year-old student in the calf and the head. The injured student happened to be in the line of fire while running after a ball on the school field. The 15-year-old left the hospital the following day. The motive for the incident was reportedly to impress his peers. |
| May 16, 2024 | Bishkek, Kyrgyzstan | Unnamed men, 20 | | 4 injured | Four schoolchildren were playing tennis and two boys at the next table started a fight. One of them left his clothes on the bench, while there was an empty hanger nearby. One of the schoolchildren did not notice the clothes and sat on them. They took him outside and a fight started. Friends came to the schoolboy's defense. The other two older boys, aged 20, stabbed them several times with a knife and ran away. |
| June 20, 2024 | Lambayeque, Peru | Unknown student | | 1 injured | M.I.S., a 15-year-old student from the Virgen de la Medalla Milagrosa school, suffered a punctured lung after being attacked with a knife by another student who has already been identified. The minor's parents are asking for justice and punishment for the school's directors, who delayed taking him to the hospital and had already been warned of the aggressor's violent behavior. |
| July 19, 2024 | Wedel, Germany | Two male students | | 1 injured | Two students attacked a teacher with a knife at a school in Wedel, northern Germany, leaving him seriously injured. The attackers fled the scene after the attack. |
| August 21, 2024 | Sanski Most, Bosnia and Herzegovina | Mehmed Vukalić, 50 | 3 dead | 1 injured (the perpetrator) | Sanski Most school shooting: A janitor kills three staff members at Sanski Most Gymnasium with a semi-automatic rifle and then attempts suicide by shooting himself in the chest. He survived and was rushed to hospital. It is the worst school shooting in Bosnia. |
| September 4, 2024 | Winder, Georgia | Colt Gray, 14 | 4 dead | 7 injured | 2024 Apalachee High School shooting: A 14-year-old student shot and killed four people and injured seven others before being taken into custody. |
| September 4, 2024 | Stockholm, Sweden | 15-year-old boy | | 1 injured | Trångsund school shooting: A 14-year-old student was shot in the head by a 15-year-old classmate inside a school toilet at Trångsundsskolan. The victim survived with serious injuries. The perpetrator was arrested the same day and later sentenced to two years and two months of closed youth care for attempted murder, gross weapons offences, and conspiracy to commit murder. |
| September 16, 2024 | Chelyabinsk, Russia | Roman Gizatulin, 13 | | 4 injured | A 13-year-old student brought two hammers, an air pistol and a knife to school, entered the classroom he was attending and attacked his classmates. Three children and a teacher were injured. After the attack, the perpetrator left the classroom and attempted to commit suicide, but was not able to complete his plan and was detained alive by police officers who arrived at the scene. |
| September 17, 2024 | Azambuja, Portugal | 12-year-old male student | | 6 injured | 2024 Azambuja school stabbing: A 12-year-old boy, wearing a bulletproof vest belonging to his father, a policeman, went to Azambuja secondary school and stabbed six of his classmates with a knife. One of his classmates was seriously injured. The motives for the attack are unknown, but it is known that the boy had been researching neo-Nazi websites. |
| October 17, 2024 | Port of Spain, Trinidad and Tobago | | | 3 injured | Three people were injured by gunfire after a burst of gunfire rang out near Port of Spain South East Secondary School on October 17, leaving students traumatized and prompting the school to close early. The shooting reportedly caused terror and panic among children at the school, with students taking refuge in their classrooms. The perpetrators are under investigation. |
| October 18, 2024 | Heliópolis, Bahia, Brazil | Samuel Santana Andrade, 14 | 4 dead (including the perpetrator) | | A 14-year-old student at the Dom Pedro I Municipal School fatally shot three other students with a .38 caliber revolver before shooting himself. |
| October 23, 2024 | Santiago, Chile | Unknown | | 35 injured | 34 students and a teacher were injured when a home-made Molotov cocktail firebomb exploded inside the Barros Arana National Boarding School, a public high school in Santiago, Chile. |
| October 24, 2024 | Montreal, Canada | Two 15-year-olds | | 4 injured | Two 15-year-old teenagers stabbed four people outside of the John F. Kennedy High School in Montreal, Quebec, Canada. The suspects were arrested. |
| October 29, 2024 | Manor, Texas USA | 18-year-old Mac Brown | 1 dead | 0 injured | An 18-year-old student was allegedly stabbing another 18-year-old student named Darwin Loving to death in a bathroom at Manor Senior High School. The suspect has been charged with 1st degree Murder A vigil has been held for the student, the school has been closed for several days before reopening with new security enhancements. |
| November 6, 2024 | Saint John, Antigua and Barbuda | 14-year-old unnamed male student | 0 dead | 1 injured | A 14-year-old Jamaican student stabbed a 14-year-old student with scissors on the grounds of Princess Margaret School shortly before 2 p.m. |
| November 14, 2024 | Yonkers, New York, U.S. | 14-year-old student | | 1 injured | A 14-year-old student at Gorton High School repeatedly stabbed a 17-year-old senior. The victim is in stable condition, and the attacker was arrested. |
| November 18, 2024 | Tirana, Albania | Unnamed students, 14 | 1 dead | 2 injured | When a 14-year-old student was stabbed to death at the exit of the "Fan Noli" school shortly after finishing classes, while two other minors were injured. The 14-year-old was attacked by three of his classmates, with whom he was allegedly arguing. The confrontation began with insults and then one of the attackers pulled out a knife, fatally wounding the 14-year-old in the heart and abdomen. Another 14-year-old student, a friend of the victim, was seriously injured in the chest and is hospitalized in stable condition. The main suspect, also 14, has a wound on his hand and is in a private hospital. It is the worst attack on a school in Albania since the shooting at a school in Elbasan and this attack caused controversy for the TikTok app, causing its closure in Albania from 2025. |
| November 30, 2024 | Guadalajara, Jalisco, Mexico | Brandon Alonso, 17 | | 2 injured | San Andrés Preparatory School attack: A 17-year-old student hit two classmates with a hammer before being subdued and arrested. His social media messages revealed premeditation. |
| December 17, 2024 | Natal, Brazil | Lyedja Yasmín Silva Santos, 19 | | 1 injured | A 19-year-old student shot a nearby student in the head, and tried to fire additional shots, but the gun failed and she was restrained by a third student. She had planned to kill herself after the attack. |
| January 10, 2025 | Nova Sintra, Cape Verde | Male student | | 1 injured | A student shot a classmate with a firearm on Thursday, January 10, 2025, wounding him in the neck, at the Eugénio Tavares High School on Brava Island, authorities announced. The incident occurred around 3:40 p.m., when the teenagers were at recess and one of them took a 6.35-caliber firearm from his backpack and shot his friend, hitting him in the neck. Despite the rough sea, the victim was transferred by the military and a nursing team to the São Francisco de Assis Hospital on the neighboring island of Fogo, and is out of danger. This was the first school shooting incident in Cape Verde and the only one so far. |
| January 16, 2025 | Spišská Stará Ves, Slovakia | Samuel Straško, 18 | 2 dead | 1 injured | Spišská Stará Ves school stabbing: An 18-year-old student killed a teacher and a fellow student with by stabbing them with a knife. He was arrested soon after the attack. |
| January 22, 2025 | Nashville, Tennessee, United States | Solomon Henderson, 17 | 2 dead (including the perpetrator) | 2 injured (1 indirectly) | Antioch High School shooting: Henderson opened fire in the school cafeteria with a semi-automatic pistol, killing one student and wounding another. He committed suicide soon after. |
| February 3, 2025 | Sheffield, England, United Kingdom | 15-year-old student | 1 dead | | A 15-year-old student fatally stabbed a fellow 15-year-old student. The attacker was arrested and retained in custody. |
| February 4, 2025 | Örebro, Sweden | Rickard Andersson, 35 | 11 dead (including the perpetrator) | 6 injured | 2025 Risbergska school shooting: Ten people were killed and six others were injured in a mass shooting at an adult educational centre in Örebro, Sweden. |
| February 14, 2025 | Guadix, Spain | 16-year-old unnamed male student | | 1 injured | On Valentine's Day, a 16-year-old 4th year ESO student stabbed another 16-year-old three times with a knife at around 1:15 p.m. The instigator of the case was arrested and the victim was sent to a hospital in Guadix to treat his leg injuries. It is known that the two had an argument on February 13, the day before the stabbing, which is a possible motive for the actions committed by the minor. |
| April 23, 2025 | Fairfax County, Virginia, United States | 15-year-old student | 0 dead | 3 injured | A 15-year-old stabbed another student during a fight with three people at West Potomac High School. Two others, including the stabber, were injured during the fight. |
| April 24, 2025 | Nantes, Pays de la Loire, France | 15-year-old student | 1 dead | 3 injured | Nantes school stabbing: A 15-year-old stabbed a female student following an argument on the second floor before returning to the first floor and stabbing another three students with two knives at a private secondary school. All three injured victims were critically injured. |
| April 24, 2025 | Aberdeen, United Kingdom | 14-year-old girl | 0 dead | 1 injured | A 14-year-old girl attacked a 12-year-old girl with a knife at Hazlehead Academy. |
| April 28, 2025 | Cheongju, North Chungcheong Province, South Korea | Student | 0 dead | 6 injured | A student with a intellectual disability stabbed six people, including three seriously injured staff members including the principal, with a knife at a high school in a mass stabbing attack. |
| May 2, 2025 | Caddington, United Kingdom | 16-year-old former student | 0 dead | 2 injured | A 16-year-old boy stabbed 2 people at Manshead Church of England Academy with only minor injuries. The boy admitted to wounding, false imprisonment and threats with a knife. |
| May 20, 2025 | Pirkkala, Finland | 16-year-old male student | 0 dead | 3 injured | A 16-year-old male student is suspected to have stabbed three students, intentionally targeting females, with a knife at Vähäjärvi School. The suspect is believed to have planned the attack for 6 months, with a manifesto being published online the day of. |
| May 22, 2025 | Phibun Mangsahan district, Thailand | 12-year-old male student | 1 dead | 0 injured | A 12-year-old student armed with a knife stabbed another student to death in a school canteen. He was restrained by bystanders and arrested. |
| June 10, 2025 | Nogent, France | 14-year-old male student | 1 dead | 0 injured | A 14-year-old student at Françoise Dolto Middle School stabbed a 31-year-old teaching assistant to death during a bag search. He was arrested and charged with murder. According to prosecutors, the student was inspired to attack school staff after he was reprimanded for kissing his girlfriend a few days prior to the incident. |
| June 10, 2025 | Graz, Austria | Arthur Achleitner, 21 | 11 dead (including the perpetrator) | 11 injured | 2025 Graz school shooting: A mass shooting took place at Dreierschützengasse High School. Ten people were killed, and the perpetrator committed suicide. |
| August 7, 2025 | Nueva Ecija, Philippines | 18-year-old male dropout | | 2 injured | An 18-year-old male high school dropout shot a 15-year-old female student before turning the gun on himself near Santa Rosa Integrated School, critically injuring both. |
| August 19, 2025 | Phoenix, Arizona, United States | 14 or 15-year-old male student | 1 dead | 1 injured (the perpetrator) | A male freshman stabbed another freshman with a pair of scissors during a fight in a classroom at Maryvale High School, critically injuring him. Both students were transported to hospital with injuries, where the victim later died. |
| October 14, 2025 | Bandar Utama, Selangor, Malaysia | 14-year-old male student | 1 dead | | Bandar Utama school stabbing: A 14-year-old student at SMK Bandar Utama Damansara (4) stabbed a 16-year-old female student with a knife around 200 times in a cubicle of the female washroom. He was later found not guilty on grounds of insanity and is held at a psychiatric hospital for an indefinite time. |
| November 7, 2025 | Kelapa Gading, Jakarta, Indonesia | 17-year-old male student | 0 dead | 97 injured (including the perpetrator) | Jakarta School bombing: A senior 17-year-old 12th-grade student at Public Senior High School 72 Jakarta entered the SMA Negeri 72 Jakarta mosque situated within a high school complex and set off multiple Improvised Explosive Devices, injuring 96. The student also carried with him "toy rifles". |
| December 9, 2025 | Winston-Salem, North Carolina, United States | Unknown | 1 dead | 1 injured | Two people were stabbed, one fatally, at North Forsyth High School. |
| January 5, 2026 | Franklin County, Pennsylvania, United States | Unknown | 0 dead | 2 injured (including the perpetrator) | A student at Chambersburg Area Middle School was injured after being stabbed in a bathroom inside the school during the early hours of the day. The accused was admitted to hospital following the incident, but released the next day. He was later charged with attempted homicide. |
| January 12, 2026 | Kyiv, Ukraine | Nikita Solovyov | 0 dead | 3 injured (including the perpetrator) | 2026 Kyiv school stabbing |
| February 5, 2026 | Milford Haven, Wales, United Kingdom | 15 year-old student | 0 dead | 1 injured | A 15 year-old student stabbed a teacher in the head at Milford Haven Comprehensive School in Pembrokeshire. At age 16, the boy was found not guilty of attempted murder in July 2026. |
| February 10, 2026 | Brent, London, United Kingdom | Unknown 13-year-old male | 0 dead | 2 injured | Kingsbury High School stabbing: Two boys aged 12 and 13 were stabbed at Kingsbury High School. Both victims were hospitalised, and a 13-year-old suspect was discovered and arrested after fleeing the school. Counter Terrorism Policing is currently leading the investigation, however a motive has not been established as of February 10. |
| February 10, 2026 | Tumbler Ridge, British Columbia, Canada. | Jesse Van Rootselaar | 9 dead (including the perpetrator) | 27 injured | 2026 Tumbler Ridge shootings: Two people were killed at a private residence and seven people, including the perpetrator, were killed at the Tumbler Ridge Secondary School in a mass shooting. Twenty-seven others were injured at the school. |
| March 5, 2026 | Nottingham, United Kingdom | 15-year-old boy | 0 dead | 1 injured | A 15-year-old boy stabbed another 15-year-old boy at Nottingham University Academy of Science and Technology. The boy was charged with causing grievous bodily harm and two counts of possession of a knife on school premises. |
| March 11, 2026 | Thorpe St Andrew, United Kingdom | 15-year-old boy | 0 dead | 1 injured | A 15-year-old boy stabbed a person at Thorpe St Andrew School with minor injuries. |
| March 26, 2026 | Chelyabinsk, Chelyabinsk Oblast, Russia | 15-year-old boy | 0 dead | 5 injured (including the perpetrator) | 2026 Chelyabinsk school attack |
| March 30, 2026 | San Cristóbal, Argentina | 15-year-old boy | 1 dead | 8 injured | A 15-year-old student opened fire with a shotgun at Escuela N°40 "Mariano Moreno", killing a 13-year-old student and injuring several more before being tackled and disarmed. |
| April 14, 2026 | Şanlıurfa Province, Turkey | Ömer Ket, 19 | 1 dead (the perpetrator) | 16 injured | 2026 Siverek school shooting: 16 people were injured in a shooting the Ahmet Koyuncu Vocational and Technical Anatolian High School in Siverek, Şanlıurfa. |
| April 15, 2026 | Kahramanmaraş Province, Turkey | İsa Aras Mersinli, 14 | 11 dead (including the perpetrator) | 19 injured (7 indirectly) | 2026 Onikişubat school shooting: Ten people were killed in a shooting at Ayser Çalık Secondary School; the perpetrator subsequently got stabbed to death. |
| April 30, 2026 | Tacoma, Washington, United States | Waleed Emad Essakhi, 16 | 0 dead | 5 injured | |
| June 9, 2026 | Manchester, United Kingdom | Unnamed schoolgirl, 14 | 0 dead | 3 injured | A schoolgirl was arrested for stabbing two fellow students and a member of staff. The school was put into lockdown and was closed down later on. |
| June 22, 2026 | Tacloban, Philippines | Two teenagers | 3 dead | 20 injured | 2026 Tacloban school shooting: Two teenagers fatally shot three students at San Jose National High School in Tacloban, Philippines. |
| August 7, 2026 | Bang Kruai, Thailand | 14-year-old male | 9 dead | 23+ injured | 2026 Nonthaburi shootings: A 14-year-old student first shot his paternal grandparents at home before heading to the Debsirin Nonthaburi School to kill more individuals including students and staff. The boy later committed suicide. |
| August 21, 2026 | Fagersta, Sweden | 18-year-old male | 1 dead | 3 injured | 2026 Fagersta school stabbing: One person was killed and three others were wounded in a stabbing attack at Brinellskolan in Fagersta. |
| September 10, 2026 | Zagreb, Croatia | Unnamed minor student | 0 dead | 2 injured | A fellow student walked into the school, according to a witness, masked just before the first bell, stabbing a fellow student with a sharp object he carried; a cleaning lady tried to stop the fight but also got stabbed. |
| October 7, 2026 | Ostrołęka, Poland | 19-year-old male | 0 dead | 10 injured | A 19-year-old student attacked people at a vocational school in Ostrołęka with a machete, injuring nine people before being arrested. |
| October 12, 2026 | Aubagne, France | 14-year-old student | 0 dead | 2 injured | A 14-year-old student entered Lakanal Middle School in Aubagne with a shotgun hidden inside a guitar case. They opened fire injuring two members of staff with no reported injuries amongst students. The student was eventually restrained by a member of school staff. Local media claim the incident may not be related to the 2026 French student protests. |

== See also ==
- List of attacks related to secondary schools (before 2000)
- List of attacks related to secondary schools (2000s)
- List of attacks related to secondary schools (2010s)
- School bullying
- School shooting
- List of school-related attacks
- List of school shootings in the United States (before 2000)
- List of school shootings in the United States (2000–present)
- List of attacks related to primary schools
- List of attacks related to post-secondary schools
- List of rampage killers: School massacres
