= List of attacks related to secondary schools (2010s) =

This is a list of attacks related to secondary schools in the 2010s that have occurred around the world. These are attacks that have occurred on school property or related primarily to school issues or events.

A narrow definition of the word attacks is used for this list so as to exclude:

1. Incidents that occurred as a result of warfare, robberies, gang violence, public attacks (as in political protests)
2. Accidental shootings
3. Murder–suicides by rejected suitors or estranged spouses
4. Suicides or suicide attempts involving only one person.
5. Incidents involving only school staff, belongs at List of workplace killings
6. Events where no injuries take place
7. A foiled attack, belongs at List of unsuccessful attacks related to schools
8. Attacks that took place at colleges, belongs at List of attacks related to post-secondary schools

The listed attacks include shootings, stabbings, slashings, bombings, and beatings administered with blunt instruments.

== 2010s ==
Date	Location	Attacker(s)	Dead (Note: Including death or injury of attacker(s), when applicable.)	Injured	Description
January 20, 2010	Livingston, Alabama, United States	Telvin Gray, 32	1 dead		Telvin Gray shot and killed Starrick Gray, his estranged wife, at Livingston High School where she worked as a special education teacher. Telvin Gray then fled the scene but was later arrested by police, was convicted of murder and sentenced to life without parole.
January 26, 2010	Ngqeleni, Eastern Cape, South Africa	Unknown, 25	2 dead	1 injured	After an argument a 25-year-old man shot and seriously wounded his girlfriend, who was working as a clerk at Jongingaba Junior-Secondary School. A 12-year-old girl was also killed inside a classroom by a stray bullet, before the gunman tried to escape. He was later caught and killed by an angry mob.
February 5, 2010	Madison, Alabama, United States	Hammad Memon, 14	1 dead		Todd Brown, a 14-year-old ninth-grade student, was shot in the back of the head in a hallway of Discovery Middle School in Madison, Alabama by another student, Hammad Memon. Brown was transported to a hospital in Huntsville, Alabama where he later died. In May 2013, Memon plead guilty to the murder of Brown, and was sentenced to 30 years of prison. After Memon is released from prison, he is likely to be deported to his native Pakistan.
February 15, 2010	Shorncliffe, Queensland, Australia	13-year-old student	1 dead		Elliot Fletcher, a 12-year-old boy, was stabbed and killed on the grounds of St Patrick's College by a 13-year-old classmate. The two students were involved in an argument on the playground of the Catholic school before the stabbing took place.
February 18, 2010	Ludwigshafen, Rhineland-Palatinate; Germany	Florian K., 23	1 dead		Florian K., a 23-year-old former student armed with a knife and a starter pistol, stabbed and killed his former 58-year-old teacher at the vocational school "Technik 2" in Ludwigshafen. He was arrested shortly after. He was reportedly upset at the teacher for giving him low grades while he was a student at the school. Eight months later he was convicted of murder and sentenced to 14 years in prison and placement in a psychiatric facility.
February 23, 2010	Littleton, Colorado, United States	Bruco Strong Eagle Eastwood, 32		2 injured	A 32-year-old gunman, identified as Bruco Strong Eagle Eastwood, armed with a .30-06 Winchester Model 70 bolt-action rifle, opened fire on students at Deer Creek Middle School at 3:30 pm (MST) as school was being let out in Littleton, Colorado. The gunman was later tackled by a math teacher and the teacher turned him into the police when they arrived on scene. The gunman shot and injured two students at the school before he was taken into custody. Eastwood was placed into a mental health facility for life.
March 17, 2010	Deerfield Beach, Florida; United States	Wayne Treacy, 15		1 injured	15-year-old Wayne Treacy stomped and kicked 15-year-old Josie Lou Ratley's head repeatedly with steel-toed boots. The attack occurred at a bus stop on the grounds of Deerfield Beach Middle School, shortly after school was let out. Ratley was critically injured and was in a coma for several weeks, and underwent major surgery to repair a portion of her skull. This attack came just five months after another incident at the same school, in which 15-year-old Michael Brewer was critically burned by five schoolmates in an off-campus attack. In 2012, Treacy was found guilty of attempted first-degree murder and was sentenced to 20 years of prison and 10 years of probation.
March 30, 2010	Oshawa, Ontario; Canada	Jacques Amakon, 18	1 dead		Michael McDonald, a 16-year-old student at Monsignor Paul Dwyer Catholic High School, was stabbed to death at a bus stop across from the school. Jacques Amakon, an 18-year-old student, was arrested after the stabbing and charged with second-degree murder. It was reported that the two students were involved in a dispute. In July 2012, Amakon was convicted of a lesser charge of manslaughter and was sentenced to 6 years of prison.
April 28, 2010	Portsmouth, Virginia, United States	Keith Elliott, 15			At around 12:15 pm, a 15-year-old student at Woodrow Wilson High School who was suspended earlier in the week for disorderly conduct entered the school through the back door and fired three shots in the cafeteria, with two hitting the ceiling and one hitting entering the wall of a classroom. The suspect left the firearm and fled, but was later apprehended by a security officer and a school administrator. The shooter, identified as 15-year-old Keith Elliott, was charged as an adult with gun violations, armed burglary and assault.
June 10, 2010	Binghamton, New York, United States			20 or more injured	A brawl broke out among the students of Binghamton High School. It started as a food fight-prank in the cafeteria, then radiated out into the streets. Some police officers and school personnel suffered minor injuries, and at least one school administrator suffered more serious injuries. Over 100 students then gathered at Oak and Main streets and the situation rapidly degraded. Police broke up the incident. The skirmishes resulted in at least 9 students being arrested and charged with disorderly conduct, resisting arrest, and/or assault in the 2nd degree. The school was put on lockdown for the rest of the day.
July 2, 2010	Heredia, Costa Rica	17-year-old student	1 dead		Principal Nancy María Chaverri, 49, was shot in the head by a 17-year-old student while inside her office at Colegio Montebello, a private school in Heredia. Chaverri died of her gunshot wound on July 11, 2010.
July 2, 2010	London, England, United Kingdom	Three people	1 dead	1 injured	A 15-year-old student was stabbed to death during a fight at Park Campus School, an alternative school. Another teenager was hospitalized for minor wounds. Three people were arrested.
August 30, 2010	Blountville, Tennessee, United States	Thomas Cowan, 62	1 dead		Thomas Cowan entered Sullivan Central High School with two loaded guns intent on killing principal Melanie Riden. SRO Carolyn Gudger was able to hold him off until back-up arrived, when they were forced to shoot and kill Cowan. No staff or students were injured.
September 8, 2010	Detroit, Michigan, United States	Steven Jamal Hare, 17		2 injured	Two students were shot and wounded in front of Mumford High School. A 17-year-old man, Steven Jamal Hare, was tried as an adult and charged with assault with intent to kill. In 2012, Hare was sentenced to 27 years of prison.
October 1, 2010	Salinas, California, United States		1 dead		15-year-old student Jose Cisneros was shot to death on an athletic field at Alisal High School, as he was walking to school. Police said that the shooting was gang-related.
October 10, 2010	Santa Clarita, California, United States			1 injured	A 16-year-old girl at William S. Hart High School was stabbed on the campus with a kitchen knife during a lunchtime fight over a boy with another female student. The victim was taken to Henry Mayo Newhall Memorial Hospital with a stab wound to the chest and the girl believed to have done the stabbing was also hospitalized with unspecified injuries.
October 24, 2010	Topeka, Kansas, United States	Coty R. Newman, 21, Austin C. Tabor, 19, Samantha L. Hochard, 20	1 dead	1 injured	20-year-old Matthew C. Mitchell was shot to death on the grounds of Topeka West High School. An unidentified juvenile was also injured in the shooting but was expected to recover. Police arrested three suspects.
November 10, 2010	Maseru, Lesotho	19-year-old unnamed student	1 dead		A 19-year-old student at Phomolong LEC Secondary School in Sekamaneng has died after being stabbed with a knife by a fellow student following an argument. Police say the Form A student died a few minutes after being stabbed. The suspect, a Form C student at the school, has since been arrested. Police suspected the two had argued while in the school toilet. Another student who was in the toilet when the incident occurred has given a witness statement to police.
November 29, 2010	Marinette, Wisconsin, United States	Samuel Hengel, 15	1 dead		Samuel Hengel took 23 students and one teacher hostage for over 5 hours at Marinette High School after firing shots at a projector. The suspect, a student in the sophomore Western Civilization class, shot himself after police officers stormed the classroom shortly after 8 p.m. All hostages were removed safely. Hengel died at 10:44 the next morning
December 6, 2010	Aurora, Colorado, United States	Luis Enrique Guzman-Rincon, 20		1 injured	In a gang-related attack outside Aurora Central High School, a 17-year-old girl was shot and wounded. The wounds caused her to be paralyzed. Luis Enrique Guzman-Rincon, 20, fired shots from a car while students were standing outside the high school, trying to shoot at a group of students who were believed to be gang rivals. Guzman-Ricon was sentenced to 35 years in prison.
December 14, 2010	Panama City, Florida, United States	Clay Duke, 56	1 dead		2010 Panama City school board shootings. A gunman named Clay Duke pulled out a gun during a school board meeting in the Panama City district. He ordered everyone but six male school board members to leave the room. He then aimed and shot at superintendent Bill Husfelt, who tried to talk him down before ducking to avoid getting shot. A security guard came in and shot Duke, and while on the ground, Duke committed suicide by shooting himself in the head.
January 5, 2011	Omaha, Nebraska, United States	Robert Butler Jr., 17	2 dead	2 injured	Robert Butler Jr., after being suspended for destruction of property, entered Millard South High School at 12:45 PM. He then entered the office of 58-year-old Vice Principal Vicki Kaspar, and shot her five times in the chest and head. As staff and teachers took cover, 44-year-old Principal Curtis Case ran into the hall because of all the commotion, and was shot multiple times in the chest and hip. As Butler left he shot randomly around the front office, causing gunshot debris to give the school nurse minor injuries. He then threatened to kill a resource officer, and left campus before he later committed suicide in a parking lot. Shortly after, EMT arrived and transported Kaspar and Case to the hospital, where Kaspar later died of her injuries. During the event Millard South went into a lockdown which later included 21,000 students in the Millard district.
January 14, 2011	Vinnytsia, Ukraine			3 injured	A ninth grade student brought a pneumatic gun to his school and started a fight with other students. The assailant then shot indiscriminately at students in the school locker room. Three students received minor injuries.
January 31, 2011	Skopje, North Macedonia			2 injured	A group of minors disrupted a class at Skopje's Marie Curie secondary school, inflicting stab wounds on a teacher and a student and beating several others, which were not injured. Police have identified nine suspects in the latest case and arrested six. Initial police reports indicate that the motive for the fight was an argument over a girlfriend.
March 25, 2011	Martinsville, Indiana, United States	Michael Phelps, 15		1 injured	Michael Phelps, a 15-year-old suspended student, returned to Martinsville West Middle School with a 9mm handgun. In the entrance of the school, Phelps encountered 15-year-old Chance Jackson and shot him twice in the abdomen. Phelps fled the school and dropped the handgun in a field and was arrested shortly after. As a result, Jackson suffered from life-threatening injuries and underwent surgery three times, and suffers from post-traumatic stress disorder. Phelps was convicted of attempted murder in August 2011, and was sentenced to 30 years in prison and 5 years of probation. He will be eligible for parole in 2026.
March 30, 2011	Houston, Texas, United States		1 dead	5 injured	An 18-year-old man died and five other people were injured when two people opened fire during a football game at Worthing High School in Houston. Police suspected that the shooting was gang-related.
May 23, 2011	Pearl City, Hawaii, United States	14-year-old male suspect		1 injured	A 14-year-old student is accused of firing a handgun on the campus of Highlands Intermediate School, wounding one student. The gunman was arrested on suspicion of attempted murder. Two other suspects were arrested in connection with the shooting.
August 10, 2011	Memphis, Tennessee, United States	Eduardo Marmolejo, 16	1 dead		Suzette York, 49, the principal of Memphis Junior Academy, was stabbed to death in a classroom by 16-year-old student Eduardo Marmolejo. Marmolejo was tried as an adult and charged with second-degree murder. In September 2013, Marmolejo was convicted of murder and was sentenced to 35 years in prison with no chance of parole.
September 16, 2011	Arroyo, Puerto Rico, United States	14-year-old student		37 injured	A 14-year-old girl stabbed 37 students with a hypodermic needle at Escuela Intermedia José D. Choudens in Arroyo, United States
September 30, 2011	South Gate, California, United States	Abraham Lopez, 18	1 dead	2 injured	On Friday, September 30, 2011, 18-year-old Abraham Lopez male student had an altercation with another 17-year-old female student (reportedly his former girlfriend) during lunch time. Lopez allegedly stabbed his former girlfriend, a female school dean, and another male student that tried to break up the fight. His former girlfriend died during surgery at St. Francis Medical Center in Lynnwood. Lopez was booked and charged with murder. The other two were treated for laceration injuries.
October 24, 2011	Fayetteville, North Carolina, United States	Charles Underwood, 15		1 injured	A 15-year-old girl was shot in the neck at Cape Fear High School. She was hospitalized for two months at Duke University Hospital in serious condition. A .22-caliber rifle was used in the attack. A student of the school,15-year-old Charles Underwood, was arrested and charged with attempted murder. Underwood was convicted of attempted first-degree murder and was sentenced to 15 years in prison.
October 24, 2011	Snohomish, Washington, United States	Female student, 15		2 injured	A 15-year-old student stabbed two female students with a butcher knife at Snohomish High School. One of the victims was stabbed 20 times, mainly in the heart and lungs, and was critically injured. The victims were both chosen at random, and the victims and suspect did not know each other. The attacker was convicted of attempted murder and was sentenced to 13 years in prison.
November 30, 2011	Vallentuna, Sweden	Male, 20		1 injured	A 17-year-old male student was attacked and stabbed by a 20-year-old masked man at Vallentuna gymnasium. The perpetrator fled the scene and was later arrested.
December 2, 2011	Gwinnett County, Georgia, United States	Ninth grade student		1 injured	A 9th grade student deliberately slammed a door on the hand of a teacher at Meadowcreek High School. The teacher was rushed to a hospital had to have a part of her finger amputated. The student was charged with aggravated battery.
December 9, 2011	Edinburg, Texas, United States			2 injured	Two students were shot after school at Harwell Middle School in Edinburg, Texas while trying out for their school's basketball team. The shooting allegedly occurred from an adult off campus who was apparently shooting on a target range.
December 12, 2011	Kristianstad, Sweden	Former male student, 19		1 injured	A 19-year-old male student was stabbed by a 19-year-old former student at Österänggymnasiet. The perpetrator fled the scene and was later arrested.
December 21, 2011	New York City, New York, United States	16-year-old male suspect		1 injured	A student at Erasmus Hall High School was critically injured after being stabbed in the head repeatedly with a pair of scissors. A 16-year-old student was arrested and charged with attempted murder.
January 9, 2012	Alahärmä, Finland	18-year-old male student	1 dead	1 injured	18-year-old male student stabbed an 18-year-old female student in the abdomen with a knife. The perpetrator then escaped the scene and committed a vehicular suicide.
January 10, 2012	Houston, Texas, United States	18-year-old male suspect		1 injured	One student was shot and injured after another student opened fire at North Forest High School. The student said that he was being confronted by three other students who were bullying him, and he took out a handgun and fired at them in self-defense. A 16-year-old bystander was unintentionally hit in the leg. The 18-year-old suspect was charged with aggravated assault with a deadly weapon.
February 14, 2012	Imatra, Finland	16-year-old male student		1 injured	16-year-old male student stabbed another male student in the chest with a knife.
February 27, 2012	Chardon, Ohio, United States	T.J. Lane, 17	3 dead	3 injured	2012 Chardon High School shooting: Six students were shot at Chardon High School. One student, Daniel Parmentor, died at the scene, and on February 28, two other students, Russell King and Demetrius Hewlin, also died. One of the three others wounded was in critical condition. The shooter, Thomas "T.J." Lane, was taken into police custody. In March 2013, Lane was convicted of the crimes and was sentenced to life in prison without parole.
March 1, 2012	Chicago, Illinois, United States	Christian Gonzalez, 17	1 dead	1 injured	17-year-old Chris Wormley was stabbed to death on the front steps of AMIKids Infinity Charter School. Another 17-year-old student was arrested. The suspect was charged as an adult with murder and attempted murder.
March 6, 2012	Jacksonville, Florida, United States	Shane Schumerth, 28	2 dead (including the perpetrator)		At Episcopal School of Jacksonville, fired Spanish teacher Shane Schumerth, 28, shot and killed head of school Dale Regan before committing suicide. Schumerth, who had been struggling with depression, was fired for incompetency around 8:30 a.m. on March 6, 2012, and escorted off school grounds. He returned to the campus at 1:15 p.m. with an AK-47 assault rifle concealed in a guitar case. He entered Regan's office and shot her multiple times before turning the gun on himself.
March 19, 2012	Toulouse, France	Mohammed Merah, 23	4 dead	1 injured	2012 Midi-Pyrénées shootings. As part of a series of three gun attacks in Toulouse and Montauban, an Islamic French citizen who claimed to be a member of al-Qaeda, shot and killed three children and one Rabbi; and seriously injured another student at the Ozar Hatorah Jewish day school.
May 7, 2012	Adelaide, Australia	Teenage male			A year eight student took a revolver on the grounds of Modbury High School, firing shots, nobody was injured.
May 19, 2012	Brindisi, Italy	Giovanni Vantaggiato, 68	1 dead	5 injured	2012 Brindisi school bombing. A three gas cylinder bomb hidden in a large rubbish bin exploded in front of the Morvillo Falcone high school in Brindisi, Italy, killing one 16-year-old female student and injuring five others – one seriously. The bomber was identified and arrested on June 6.
May 25, 2012	Sankt Poelten, Austria	Unidentified male, 37	2 dead		Shortly after 8:00 local time, an armed 37-year-old man entered Volksschule Wagram in Sankt Poelten, Austria, and hauled his two children out of the classroom. His 7-year-old daughter managed to escape unscathed, but he took his 8-year-old son to a cloakroom and shot him in the head, critically injuring him. The father then fled from the school grounds in his car, and later died by suicide after he crashed the car on a local farm road. The most likely motive for his actions is that he wanted to get revenge on his wife. The 8-year-old son dies two days later.
August 16, 2012	Memphis, Tennessee, United States			2 injured	Two Hamilton High School students were shot and wounded in the parking lot of the school. The attack was believed to be gang-related.
August 27, 2012	Perry Hall, Maryland, United States	Robert Wayne Gladden Jr., 15		1 injured	Robert Gladden, 15, took a double barrel shotgun to Perry Hall High School and fired shots inside the school cafeteria. A 17-year-old senior with Down syndrome was hit in the lower back while he was sitting at a table and suffered critical wounds. Gladden was immediately subdued by two school faculty members, and was arrested. He was tried as an adult for attempted murder and was sentenced to 35 years in prison.
October 9, 2012	Norfolk, England, United Kingdom	17-year-old student		1 injured	A student stabbed another student in the shoulder and elbow at Langley School. The 17-year-old suspect was arrested on suspicion of causing grievous bodily harm with intent.
October 15, 2012	Kerava, Finland	13-year-old female student		1 injured	A 13-year-old female student started threatening other students with a knife at Sampio Lower Secondary School. One of the student tried to disarm her and was slightly injured to the arm.
October 24, 2012	Hopewell, KwaZulu-Natal, South Africa	Two students	1 dead	2 injured	16-year-old Nkosingiphile Ngcamu was dragged off the campus of Umlulama Secondary School and fatally stabbed. Two students who were injured during the stabbing were arrested for Ngcamu's death.
January 10, 2013	Taft, California, United States	Bryan Oliver, 16 (charged)		2 injured	A gunman entered a science classroom of Taft Union High School with a 12 gauge shotgun and opened fire. A 16-year-old male student, identified as Bowe Cleveland, was shot in the chest and critically wounded. Another student was shot at, but was not hit. The classroom teacher, Ryan Heber, convinced him to drop his weapon, and the gunman followed his order and was later arrested. Additionally, Heber suffered a minor wound from being grazed by a shotgun pellet during the ordeal. The gunman is suspected to be a 16-year-old student of the school, Bryan Oliver. Cleveland and the other student that was shot at are both believed to be intended targets of the gunman. On January 14, Oliver was charged with two counts of attempted murder and assault with a firearm.
January 12, 2013	Detroit, Michigan, United States			1 injured	A 16-year-old boy was shot in a field across the school campus after a basketball game was held at Osborn High School. He was hospitalized in serious condition.
January 16, 2013	Spring Township, Berks County, Pennsylvania, United States	14-year-old male student		1 injured	A 14-year-old male student stabbed another 14-year-old male student four times with a pocketknife at Wilson Southern Middle School. The victim was hospitalized with non-life-threatening injuries. The school and an adjacent elementary school went on lock down, and the assailant was arrested after fleeing from the school. The assailant was tried as a juvenile for attempted homicide. In February 2013, he was sentenced to 12 months at a juvenile treatment facility. He will receive periodical evaluation after his sentence finishes.
January 31, 2013	Phoenix, Arizona, United States				An argument over turf and respect between two rival gangs escalated to what police described as a "gun battle" at Cesar Chavez High School in Phoenix. Approximately fifteen shots were fired in the vicinity of people waiting to get into a scheduled boys' basketball game. Nobody was injured.
January 31, 2013	Atlanta, Georgia, United States	Name and age withheld		2 injured	A 14-year-old male student was shot and wounded in the back of the neck at Price Middle School. The gunman, a student, was believed to be arguing with the other student before taking out a handgun and firing multiple shots at him. In addition, a teacher was injured during the shooting. Afterward, the gunman was disarmed by a school resource officer and subsequently apprehended. The suspect was charged with aggravated assault.
March 2013	Cape Town, South Africa			1 injured	A grade nine Oscar Mpetha High School was stabbed twice in the stomach and sustained cuts to the head.
March 23, 2013	Shinas, Oman	Abdulaziz Al Maamari		1 injured	Teacher Abdulaziz, tired of being told that he had allegedly abused his eight-year-old son, pulled out a nine-millimeter revolver and shot one of the boys in his class, Abdul Aziz Al Balushi. After the shooting, the teacher turned himself in to the police and was eventually arrested.
April 25, 2013	Mankgodi, Botswana	Student charged		1 injured	A student was stabbed and severely wounded at Thobega Junior Secondary School by another student.
May 7, 2013	Savannah, Georgia, United States	Student charged		1 injured	A 13-year-old female student was stabbed by another female student at DeRenne Middle School. She was hospitalized for non-life-threatening injuries to the head, shoulder and right arm. The suspect was charged with aggravated assault, possession of a weapon on school property and disrupting public school.
May 14, 2013	Cape Town, South Africa		1 dead		17-year-old Enrico Martin was shot in the head while he was entering Spes Bona High School. He later died in a hospital. Authorities believe that the attack was gang-related. No arrests have been made.
June 6, 2013	Amadora, Portugal	Ex-student charged	1 dead	1 injured	Leinine Sanches, an ex-student aged between 18 and 20 years old was stabbed twice in the chest outside the Escola Secundária Seomara da Costa Primo. He managed to enter the school grounds but died there. Everything points to this being the result of a settling of scores between rival gangs, as a result of the clashes that took place the day before in Queluz. The stabber, also an ex-student of the school, fled to the United Kingdom. A 19-year-old student was stoned and taken to the Amadora-Sintra Hospital. 3 suspects were also detained for their involvement, but none of them was the author of the fatal stabs. The 20-year-old suspected of Sanches's murder fled to England and was detained by the British police in London during a robbery attempt on March 5, 2014.
June 20, 2013	West Palm Beach, Florida, United States		2 dead		Two custodians at Alexander W. Dreyfoos School were shot and killed. The deceased were Christopher Marshall, 48, and his boss Ted Orama, 56. A third custodian was suspected in the killings and was apparently on the lam.
June 26, 2013	Amadora, Portugal			1 injured	An 18-year-old student at the Escola Secundária Seomara da Costa Primo, in Amadora, was attacked by a group of people and stabbed in the legs and the back at a bus stop near the school. The student managed to run away to the school, where he was assisted by technicians and was transported to the São Francisco Xavier Hospital, in Lisbon, where he entered surgical intervention. This happened just 20 days after an ex-student was fatally stabbed and a student stoned at the same school.
July 6, 2013	Yobe State, Nigeria	Multiple gunmen	42 dead	6 injured	Yobe State school shooting: Suspected Boko Haram militants opened fire on students and deployed explosives before setting the building on fire. 42 were killed.
August 23, 2013	Sardis, Mississippi, United States	Three male suspects	1 dead	2 injured	A student, Roderick Bobo, 15, was shot dead during a football game at North Panola High School in what was termed as a gang-related shooting. Two others were injured in the shooting, and three men were charged as being responsible for the crime.
August 26, 2013	North Las Vegas, Nevada, United States	Six male suspects		3 injured	Six non-student suspects robbed and pistol whipped a juvenile student for his cell phone at Canyon Springs High School. The suspects then pistol whipped a second student. Afterward, another student was beaten in a brawl with the suspects in the school parking lot. One of the students struck by the handgun suffered fractures to his skull, cheekbone, and ribs. Six suspects were arrested, and face charges of robbery and battery with a deadly weapon.
September 1, 2013	Winston-Salem, North Carolina, United States	18-year-old male suspect		1 injured	A 15-year-old student was shot in the neck and shoulder at Carver High School. The student was hospitalized with non-life-threatening injuries. An 18-year-old student was arrested by a school resource officer and was charged with assault with a deadly weapon inflicting serious injury, carrying a concealed gun, possessing and discharging a firearm, and carrying a firearm onto educational property. The shooting is believed to be the result of an ongoing dispute between the suspect and the victim.
September 4, 2013	Spring, Texas, United States	Luis Alonzo Alfaro, 17 (charged)	1 dead	3 injured	Spring High School stabbing. A 17-year-old student was stabbed to death at Spring High School, and three others were injured. Luis Alonzo Alfaro age 17, was charged with murder. Alfaro admitted pulling a knife during the fight and stabbing four people. In September 2014, Alfaro was convicted of manslaughter and sentenced to 20 years of prison.
September 20, 2013	Vereeniging, South Africa	One student arrested		1 injured	A student shot a teacher in the leg at Sasolburg High School. A Grade 9 student was arrested.
September 24, 2013	Greeneville, Tennessee, United States	17-year-old male suspect		1 injured	A 15-year-old student was stabbed and injured at South Greene High School before classes started. Students subdued the assailant until staff members arrived on scene. The victim was hospitalized in stable condition. The suspect, a student, was charged with attempted first-degree murder. The suspect, Jacob Mitchell, is being tried as an adult for attempted murder. Mitchell faces up to 15 to 25 years of prison if convicted.
October 3, 2013	Cape Town, South Africa		1 dead		A New Eisleben High School student, 17-year-old Anele Mhawuli, was stabbed and fatally wounded. The incident was believed to be gang-related.
October 4, 2013	Pine Hills, Florida, United States			2 injured	A 16-year-old student was shot in the hip at Agape Christian Academy after a fight broke out at 2 pm. An innocent bystander was hit in his ankle by a stray bullet or shrapnel. The two victims were treated for non-life-threatening injuries. The suspected shooter reportedly fled in a car with several other males. He was not caught.
October 7, 2013	Lincoln, Nebraska, United States			1 injured	A female student was stabbed and injured in the restroom of Pius X High School. A female student was arrested and is tried as an adult with first-degree aggravated assault and use of a deadly weapon.
October 8, 2013	Johannesburg, South Africa		1 dead		At Kgothalang Secondary School, a 17-year-old pupil was stabbed in the chest, shoulder and abdomen during break time. He died at the scene. The alleged killer, a Grade 10 pupil, jumped over the school fence and fled.
October 10, 2013	Oulu, Finland	16-year-old male suspect		4 injured	A 16-year-old Myllytulli vocational school student stabbed 3 girls and a janitor during lunch hour. The suspect had been questioned by the police in February for a school shooting threat he had made on the internet.
October 14, 2013	Sintra, Portugal	Gonçalo Anastácio, 15 (charged)		5 injured	15-year-old Gonçalo Anastácio stabbed 3 students and a janitor at the Escola Secondária Stuart de Carvalhais, a 4th student was also injured after falling while he was running away. Anastácio ran away from the school but was intercepted by the authorities still in the vicinity of the school grounds. Anastácio planned to imitate a massacre and kill at least 60 people according to an A4 sheet that was in his backpack when he was arrested. the materials that were to be used by Anastácio were knives, smoke, homemade bombs, pepper spray, a stick, gasoline, alcohol, matches, a lighter and a shotgun. Anastácio also made a bomb explode on the gym, causing students to run away. on February 2, 2014, Anastácio was sentenced to two and a half years of internment in a closed regime.
October 21, 2013	Sparks, Nevada, United States	Jose Reyes, 12	2 dead	2 injured	At approximately 7:15 am, a 12-year-old seventh grade student, Jose Reyes, opened fire with a Ruger 9 mm semi-automatic handgun at Sparks Middle School. A 12-year-old male student was hit in the shoulder and wounded. A teacher, Michael Landsberry, tried to intervene with Reyes and was fatally shot in the chest, while standing on a playground. Reyes then shot and wounded another male student in the abdomen who tried to come to Landsberry's assistance as he fell onto the ground. The shooter then committed suicide from a self-inflicted gunshot wound to the head. Students from the middle school were placed into an adjacent elementary school, and students from both schools were held at Sparks High School, where they waited for their guardians to pick them up.
October 22, 2013	Danvers, Massachusetts, United States	Philip Chism, 14 (charged)	1 dead		Colleen Ritzer, a 24-year-old algebra teacher was punched several times, raped, and then stabbed to death with a box cutter inside a restroom on the second floor of Danvers High School. Ritzer's body was then disposed. Her body was found in the woods behind the school's campus. On October 23, police arrested a 14-year-old student and booked him on a charge of murder, to be tried as an adult. On November 21, 2013, Philip Chism was indicted on charges of murder, aggravated rape, and armed robbery. On December 15, 2015, Chism was found guilty of these charges.
November 3, 2013	Lithonia, Georgia, United States			2 injured	A Stephenson High School student and a janitor were shot in an apparent confrontation between team members and a group of teens who were not attending the school. Both were innocent bystanders in the ordeal.
November 6, 2013	Morgantown, West Virginia, United States	Male suspects, 14 and 17		2 injured	According to police and witnesses, a 14-year-old student stabbed a 17-year-old student at Morgantown High School, after he was attacked by the older student. The 17-year-old was stabbed in the arms and chest multiple times, and was hospitalized for non-life-threatening injuries. The 14-year-old student was charged with unlawful assault and possessing a weapon on school grounds, and the 17-year-old was charged with battery.
November 13, 2013	Pittsburgh, Pennsylvania, United States	Six suspects arrested		3 injured	After classes ended, at least one gunman came out of the woods and opened fire on three students as they were walking to their cars at Brashear High School. One student was grazed in the head, another was struck in the neck and shoulder, and a third was hit in the leg and foot. Six people were taken into custody. The shooting is believed to be drug-related.
November 13, 2013	New Braunfels, Texas, United States	Student male suspect	1 dead		A 15-year-old student died after being punched twice as he was exiting a classroom at Canyon High School. The attacker was charged in connection with the student's death.
December 4, 2013	Winter Garden, Florida, United States	J'Morian Bell, 17 (charged)		1 injured	A 15-year-old student was shot and wounded by a 17-year-old student near a soccer field on the campus of West Orange High School. The shooting occurred after a fight broke out between the two students. The 17-year-old suspected shooter was taken into custody several miles away from the school, and is charged with attempted murder, aggravated battery with a firearm, possession of a firearm by a minor and possession of a firearm on school grounds. The suspect is a documented gang member.
December 13, 2013	Centennial, Colorado, United States	Karl Pierson, 18	2 dead		18-year-old male student Karl Pierson opened fire with a shotgun at Arapahoe High School, critically wounding a 17-year-old female student, Claire Davis. Pierson then committed suicide by shooting himself. Davis died from her injuries eight days later. It was reported that Pierson was looking for the school librarian who had disciplined him, and intended to shoot him, but the faculty member had left the building before the shooting.
December 13, 2013	Vallejo, California, United States			1 injured	A male student's head was slashed with a knife at Vallejo High School, allegedly by a 15-year-old female student. The suspect was arrested and charged.
December 16, 2013	Bradenton, Florida, United States			2 injured	A student stabbed two students with scissors at Lee Middle School. He was charged with aggravated battery.
December 19, 2013	Fresno, California, United States	Four suspects		1 injured	Four teens went into Edison High School in what was believed as a gang-initiation process. After accosting a 62-year-old woman about a mile away from school grounds, they found an athletic trainer who taught at Edison High and shot him several times in the leg and stomach. It took a few days for the youths to get caught, and this was cinched when the 62-year-old woman and some surveillance video gave police the information they needed.
January 9, 2014	Jackson, Tennessee, United States	16-year-old male suspect		1 injured	A 16-year-old student was charged with bringing a gun to school at Liberty Technology Magnet High School in Jackson, Tennessee and shooting a classmate in the thigh. The incident occurred outside the front of the school.
January 12, 2014	San Antonio, Texas, United States	13-year-old male suspect		1 injured	A 13-year-old Devine Middle School student allegedly stabbed and injured a band teacher on school campus. The suspect was charged with aggravated assault with a deadly weapon in a weapons free zone.
January 13, 2014	New Haven, Connecticut, United States			1 injured	A 14-year-old boy was shot outside of a basketball game at the Hillhouse High School athletic facility, suffering wounds in his hand and leg.
January 14, 2014	Roswell, New Mexico, United States	Mason Campbell, 12 (charged)		3 injured	Two people were shot and wounded inside the gymnasium at Berrendo Middle School, at about 8:10 am. An 11-year-old boy and a 13-year-old girl were airlifted to a hospital in Lubbock, Texas in critical condition. A 12-year-old suspect, Mason Campbell, was arrested at the scene after a teacher convinced him to drop the shotgun. A staff member received minor injuries. Campbell is facing charges of three counts of aggravated battery with a deadly weapon, and can be held in a juvenile detention facility until he turns 21 years old.
January 17, 2014	Philadelphia, Pennsylvania, United States	Reisheem Rochwell, 17 (charged)		2 injured	Two students were shot and injured in the gymnasium of Delaware Valley Charter School in Philadelphia. Another student turned himself in to the police following the shooting. A 17-year-old student, Reisheem Rochwell, was arrested and charged as an adult for attempted murder.
January 17, 2014	Albany, Georgia, United States	Rico Cheyenn Fields, 16 (charged)		1 injured	At Albany High School, Brenton Helstock was shot once in the left forearm after a verbal altercation with a suspect now identified as 16-year-old Rico Cheyenn Fields.
January 27, 2014	Carbondale, Illinois, United States	Omari A. Tinsley, 18		1 injured	A group of students at Rebound High School got in an argument in the school's parking lot. One student's father pulled up and saw Tinsley and another male both beating his son and he proceeded to help his son by joining the fight. The father got his son and was running to the car when he fell and Tinsley shot him. Omari A. Tinsley was convicted of aggravated battery and discharging a firearm and sentenced to 25 years in prison.
January 28, 2014	Honolulu, Hawai'i, United States	17-year-old male student		2 injured	A 17-year-old boy was shot in the wrist after attacking police officers with a kitchen knife at President Theodore Roosevelt High School.
January 31, 2014	Des Moines, Iowa, United States			1 injured	After a basketball game at North High School, there was gunfire in a parking lot of the school. 6 males in a black jeep had come moments before the shooting and returned at the time it happened. A 15-year-old girl was injured by a ricocheting bullet. While officers were gaining control of the area, teachers on the scene led students into the school building for safety.
February 3, 2014	Moscow, Russia	Sergei Gordeyev, 15	2 dead	1 injured	2014 Moscow school shooting: On 3 February 2014 at School No. 263 in Moscow, Russia, 15-year-old student Sergei Gordeyev. armed with a rifle, killed his geography teacher and took his classmates hostage. He then opened fire on police officers who arrived on the scene, killing an officer and seriously wounding a seargent. After negotiations involving his father, the suspect released the hostages and was apprehended a short time later.
February 3, 2014	San Fernando, Trinidad and Tobago			2 injured	
February 4, 2014	New South Wales, Australia			1 injured	At Shoalhaven High School, 14-year-old student was stabbed once in the chest and was hospitalized for serious injuries.
February 5, 2014	Morvant, Trinidad and Tobago			2 injured	At Russel Latapy Secondary School, two 14-year-old students got into an altercation and one of them took out a knife and stabbed the other in the back. The victim was treated at Morvant Health Centre.
February 10, 2014	Salisbury, North Carolina, United States			1 injured	A 16-year-old student was shot in the stomach on the campus of Salisbury High School. A 17-year-old suspect is wanted in connection with the shooting.
February 10, 2014	Lyndhurst, Ohio, United States				Five shots were fired in the parking lot of Charles F. Brush High School, in Lyndhurst, Ohio, including one which hit an unoccupied police car. No one was reported to be injured, though a school basketball game was going on at the time.
March 25, 2014	Lilburn, Georgia, United States			1 injured	A 16-year-old student, David Egan, was beaten in the locker room of Parkview High School, during weightlifting class. Egan received reconstructive surgery for injuries to his face. The suspected attacker faces aggravated battery charges.
March 25, 2014	College Park, Georgia, United States				An argument between students led to shots being fired in a Benjamin Banneker High School parking lot during the afternoon. Investigators believe multiple people were present when shots were fired, but it was not known how many could face charges for the incident. No one was injured in the shooting.
March 25, 2014	Ontario, California, United States	Female student, 16		1 injured	A 16-year-old stabbed another 16-year-old girl during a fight at Valley View High School The attacker was arrested and charged with assault with a deadly weapon.
March 26, 2014	Cambridge, Massachusetts, United States	Female student, 19		1 injured	A 19-year-old student stabbed another student in the shoulder with a steak knife during a fight at Cambridge Rindge and Latin School. The 19-year-old student was charged with assault and battery with a dangerous weapon on school grounds.
March 30, 2014	Ashdod, Israel	Student, 15		1 injured	A 15-year-old student was stabbed and moderately wounded at a high school. The victim was stabbed twice in the chest with a sharp object during an altercation with another student, and was subsequently hospitalized. A 15-year-old suspect fled the scene and was apprehended.
April 9, 2014	Murrysville, Pennsylvania, United States	Alex Hribal, 16 (charged)		25 injured	In the Murrysville stabbing, 16-year-old student Alex Hribal allegedly went on a stabbing rampage through classrooms and halls of the Franklin Regional High School. The student was apprehended and was in custody, being interrogated by police. Police said the motive was unknown and identified the student as a sophomore. Seven out of the 22 injured sustained 'life-threatening wounds' to the torso-and-back.
April 9, 2014	Greenville, North Carolina, United States				Just after the lunch hour, at D. H. Conley High School, a car drove past the school and witnesses said an occupant reached out of a car window and fired shots in the direction of the school. This incident occurred on Worthington and Tull Roads, directly in front of the school. No one was injured.
April 11, 2014	Detroit, Michigan, United States	Four suspects	1 dead		After a Friday evening student awards night, called Grammy Night, 4 men who were affiliated with a gang fired into a crowd in the parking lot of Detroit East English Preparatory Academy and one nineteen-year-old teen, Darryl Smith, was fatally shot in the head. Smith was not a student at the academy.
April 12, 2014	Pietermaritzburg, South Africa	Multiple suspects		4 injured	Four students were stabbed and injured during a fight on a school bus. One of the students suffered severe facial injuries. The incident is believed to be gang-related.
April 15, 2014	Brampton, Ontario, Canada	Three suspects		1 injured	A 17-year-old male student was stabbed in the hallway of St. Roch Catholic Secondary School, and was hospitalized for non-life-threatening injuries. Three students were arrested in connection with the incident.
April 17, 2014	Cape Town, South Africa	Three suspects	1 dead		A 15-year-old Groot Brak High School student was stabbed after he boarded on a school bus. He died later at a hospital. The 15-year-old suspect was arguing with the victim about a seat. He was arrested.
April 18, 2014	Fort Lauderdale, Florida, United States	Kimanie King, 18 (charged)		1 injured	A 16-year-old was stabbed with a pocket knife three times at Piper High School during an argument about a basketball game. An 18-year-old student was arrested and charged.
April 25, 2014	Milford, Connecticut, United States	Chris Plaskon, 16 (charged)	1 dead		A 16-year-old female student was stabbed to death in the hallways of Jonathan Law High School. A 16-year-old student was arrested. The attack may have been connected to a prom invitation.
April 28, 2014	Leeds, England, United Kingdom	Will Cornick, 15	1 dead		Spanish teacher Ann Maguire, 61, was stabbed in the neck and back by 15-year-old student, she was taken to Leeds General Infirmary following the attack but later pronounced dead. A 15-year-old Will Cornick was detained by teaching staff at Corpus Christi Catholic College and later arrested. On November 9 of the same year he was sentenced to life with minimum of 20 years.
April 29, 2014	Dover, Delaware, United States	Five unidentified students, 15–17		1 injured	A student was beaten on a school bus that was heading to students' homes from Parkway Academy Central. The beating was recorded and appeared on social media websites. Five students were charged with third-degree assault and third-degree conspiracy in connection with the attack. The victim did not suffer serious injuries.
May 1, 2014	Los Banos, California, United States	Unnamed student, 14 (charged)		1 injured	A 13-year-old student was stabbed and injured during a school fire drill for Los Banos Junior High School. A 14-year-old classmate was arrested on suspicion of attempted murder in connection with the incident. A folding knife was believed to be the weapon used. The victim was hospitalized for nearly one week for non-critical injuries.
May 2, 2014	Atizapan, Mexico	Edgar Yoevani, 15 (charged)	1 dead		13-year-old Ricardo Ordonez was shot and killed at a school. 15-year-old Edgar Yoevani was arrested.
May 6, 2014	Richmond, California, United States			1 injured	A 14-year-old student was injured during a drive-by shooting in front of John F. Kennedy High School at 8:30 am. He was shot as he was running towards the school campus after a fight took place. The student suffered a serious but stable injury to his leg. Police were searching for a suspect.
June 10, 2014	Troutdale, Oregon United States	Jared Michael Padgett, 15	2 dead	1 injured	A lone gunman dressed in black body armor and wearing a helmet entered Reynolds High School, killing 14-year-old Emilio Hoffman, injured a physical education teacher and then turned the gun on himself. The school went under immediate lockdown and students evacuated. Police later confirmed that one student and the gunman had died in the shooting, with it later being revealed that Padgett had killed himself.
August 25, 2014	Morón, Buenos Aires, Argentina	Buenos Aires Police	1 dead		While at least 6 policemen were in a shootout with two criminals, a stray bullet hit the heart of Sabrina Olmos, a 15-year-old girl who was in the courtyard of "Félix Burgos" High School with her classmates, fatally wounding her. One of the criminals was arrested but later it was confirmed that the stray bullet belonged to one of the police's service weapons.
September 9, 2014	Miami, Florida, United States			1 injured	Towards the end of the school day, one alternative school student in Miami was shot as a small group of students tussled. The injury was minor, requiring hospitalization, and five young adults were later questioned.
September 22, 2014	Toronto, Ontario, Canada	Suspect, 17	1 dead		19-year-old student Hamid Aminzada stabbed to death at North Albion Collegiate Institute. A 17-year-old student is suspected of the stabbing death.
September 27, 2014	Council Bluffs, Iowa, United States	Suspect, 16	1 dead		A 17-year-old died from being punched by a 16-year-old student at Abraham Lincoln High School. Charges were dismissed against the 16-year-old student.
September 30, 2014	Albemarle, North Carolina, United States	Suspect, 16		1 injured	A 16-year-old was shot and wounded at Albemarle High School. One student was arrested.
September 30, 2014	Louisville, Kentucky, United States	Suspect, 15		1 injured	A 16-year-old was shot and wounded at Fern Creek High School. A suspect was arrested.
October 3, 2014	Fairburn, Georgia, United States	Eric Dana Johnson Jr., 18 (charged)	1 dead		After a homecoming football game, the fatal shooting of Kristofer Hunter, 17, occurred in the Langston Hughes High School parking lot. The suspect, Eric Dana Johnson Jr., 18, turned himself in a week later.
October 13, 2014	Midlothian, Virginia, United States			1 injured	Manchester High School stabbing; Victim was stabbed in the band room, suspect arrested.
October 14, 2014	Žďár nad Sázavou, Vysočina Region, Czech Republic	Barbora Orlová, 26	1 dead	5 injured	Žďár nad Sázavou school stabbing: A 26-year-old woman entered a secondary school and began stabbing those nearby in a random attack. She first stabbed a female student, and then attacked a 16-year-old male student who tried to help the girl. She then took another female student hostage, as police and EMS arrived. She allowed medics to treat the students, and entered into a standoff with the police. This ended when she was immobilized with a taser, although she injured both the hostage and the police negotiator before being detained. The female student initially stabbed was treated for serious injuries and required surgery, the male student was killed, and the female hostage and negotiator were both treated for minor injuries. Another female student who witnessed these events was treated for shock. This was the second time the same suspect had been involved in a similar event. She had previously attacked an elementary school in May 2012 near Ostrava - where she had attempted to kidnap a 7-year-old girl in the school cafeteria. She stabbed and injured a female teacher protecting her, and held the girl hostage, eventually surrendering her after police negotiations. The woman was diagnosed with schizophrenia, and placed in a mental facility, until she was released to home care in February 2014.
October 24, 2014	Marysville, Washington, United States	Jaylen Fryberg, 15	5 dead	2 injured	2014 Marysville Pilchuck High School shooting. Jaylen Fryberg, a freshman student, opened fire in the cafeteria of Marysville Pilchuck High School, killing one student and wounding four others. Three more victims die on other days while in the hospital. Fryberg shot himself at the end of the attack.
October 24, 2014	Utsjoki, Finland	31-year-old adult student	1 dead		One killed in a stabbing at a high school in Utsjoki. The 31-year-old suspect had a previous criminal record.
October 27, 2014	Viljandi, Estonia	Vahur Ruut, 15	1 dead		2014 Viljandi school shooting. A 15-year-old student shot and killed Ene Sarap, his German language teacher at the Paalalinna School in Viljandi. Four other students were also present during the shooting. On October 20, 2015, he was sentenced to nine years in jail. The incident represents the only case of a school shooting in Estonia.
November 20, 2014	Miami, Florida, United States		1 dead	1 injured	Two teens were shot Thursday during a fight on Miami Carol City High School property. One of the boys who was shot died.
December 12, 2014	Portland, Oregon, United States	Unknown		4 injured	On December 12, 2014, an unknown gunman shot three students outside Rosemary Anderson High School in north Portland, two boys and one girl, were "conscious and breathing" as they were rushed to a local hospital another student was grazed in the foot by a bullet and treated at the scene. Later police arrested 18-year-old Marquel Dugas and 22-year-old Lonzo Murphy, during Murphy's arrest, a handgun was located and seized by police.Also police arrested Lonzo's brother Marquise Murphy as a third suspect in the case.
January 15, 2015	Milwaukee, Wisconsin, United States	Michael Riley, 37		3 injured	A 15-year-old boy, a student's father, and a teacher were each injured at Wisconsin Lutheran High School shooting that occurred Thursday night in the school parking lot at Wisconsin Lutheran High School. The student had unspecified injuries that were treated.Riley was on federal probation for drug-related charges when he committed the shooting.
January 16, 2015	Ocala, Florida, United States			2 injured	Two were injured in gunfire that occurred after a Friday night basketball game at Vanguard High School. A 14-year-old female student was injured directly by a bullet while a 19-year-old woman was injured by ricocheting glass.
January 23, 2015	Los Angeles, California, United States	Suspects, 13 and 14	1 dead		14-year-old Steven Cruz was fatally stabbed with a pair of scissors while he was meeting with friends at the corridor of David Wark Griffith Middle School, shortly after classes were being dismissed. Two male suspects, aged 13 and 14, were arrested and charged with murder and gang enhancements.
February 4, 2015	Frederick, Maryland, United States			2 injured	Two students were shot outside Frederick High School near the gymnasium of Frederick High School during a junior varsity (JV) boys' basketball game. Approximately 200 students, staff, and faculty were placed on lockdown for several hours after the shooting while police searched for the suspects. No suspects have been apprehended, although witnesses report seeing four black males dressed all in black who are considered by police to be suspects in this shooting.
February 15, 2015	Merced, California, United States	Two suspects	1 dead		A 16-year-old boy was shot dead in a parking lot of Tenaya Middle School, after school hours. Two suspects, aged 20 and 17, were arrested. The shooting was reportedly over jealousy of a female.
February 15, 2015	Little Rock, Arkansas, United States	Ricky Stump, 62		2 injured	
March 10, 2015	Spring Valley, New York, United States	Suspect, 16		1 injured	A 17-year-old was stabbed four times and seriously injured at Spring Valley High School. A 16-year-old was arrested and charged as an adult with attempted murder.
March 26, 2015	Martinez, California, United States	Suspect, 13		1 injured	A 13-year-old student stabbed an 11-year-old student in the back at Martinez Junior High School. The victim received non-life-threatening injuries, and the suspect was arrested.
April 15, 2015	San Francisco, Córdoba, Argentina	Mauro Bongiovanni, 45	1 dead		After escaping from a psychiatric hospital, Mauro Bongiovanni, 45, enters the kindergarten where his ex-wife, María Eugenia Lanzetti, 44, worked, and slaughtered her with a kitchen knife in front of all the children between 3 and 4 years old who they were in his care. The aggressor is detained.
April 16, 2015	Paradis, Louisiana, United States			1 injured	A police officer was shot outside a school in a school zone while he was directing school buses into a school. The school was J.B. Martin Middle School, and the suspect was apprehended at the scene.
April 20, 2015	Barcelona, Spain	Max Porta, 13	1 dead	4 injured	Barcelona school killing at the IES Joan Fuster a 13-year-old boy armed with a homemade crossbow, a machete and Molotov cocktails, started firing causing the death of a teacher due to a machete wound and the arrow of the crossbow, four students were injured. Apparently the boy had a list with the names of 24 people he wanted to kill. The first ever student to organise a school shooting in Spain had a breakdown when his PE teacher managed to talk to him, then proceeded to sit in a classroom until the police arrived. Under the Spanish law, the boy is exempt from legal responsibility because he's under 14 years old. Now he is in a psychiatric clinic in his locality.
April 22, 2015	Desert Hot Springs, California, United States	Suspect, 12		1 injured	A 13-year-old student was stabbed by a 12-year-old classmate at Painted Hills Middle School. The suspect was arrested, and the victim received non-life-threatening injuries.
April 27, 2015	Lacey, Washington, United States	Suspect, 16			In the North Thurston High School Shooting, a student at North Thurston High School walked into the commons area and fired two shots into the ceiling from a .357 magnum pistol. Brady Olson, a teacher at the school, was able to tackle the student before they could turn the gun on other students. No one was injured or killed.
May 3, 2015	Midrand, South Africa		1 dead		A student was stabbed to death with scissors at the Tsosoloso Ya Afrika secondary school.
May 12, 2015	Jacksonville, Florida, United States	Edgar Robles, 16		2 injured	Robles is accused of shooting 15-year-olds Ayana Sherman and Shakayla Singleton while both were riding on a packed school bus.Before the shooting Robles and two friends made threats towards the victims to fight them as part of revenge plot because of previous argument they had with them.
May 18, 2015	Shellbrook, Saskatchewan, Canada	Michael Rudolph, 19		1 injured	A 17-year-old female student was stabbed and seriously injured at W.P. Sandin Public School. 19-year-old Michael Rudolph was arrested and charged with assault.
May 29, 2015	Ennerdale, South Africa	Three suspects	1 dead		A 21-year-old man trespassing on school grounds was stabbed to death by three high school pupils.
June 1, 2015	Upper Marlboro, Maryland, United States	Unnamed suspect, 14		1 injured	A 16-year-old was seriously injured after being stabbed during a fight at Frederick Douglass High School. A 14-year-old was arrested.
June 2, 2015	Winnipeg, Manitoba, Canada	Unnamed suspect, 17	1 dead		A 17-year-old Brett Bourne was stabbed to death in front of Kelvin High School, during a fight. Another 17-year-old was charged with second-degree murder.
June 11, 2015	Bradford, United Kingdom	Student, 14		1 injured	A 14-year-old boy has been charged with attempted murder after a teacher was stabbed in the stomach in a classroom full of pupils. Bradford Crown Court heard that the attack was premeditated and partially racially motivated. Uzomah is black and the boy, who is of Pakistani origin, regularly referred to him "by the epithet beginning with the letter N"
August 25, 2015	Philippi, West Virginia, United States	Unnamed suspect, 14			At Philip Barbour High School, a 14-year-old male student took his classroom hostage with a .380-caliber handgun, and then surrendered to authorities. Nobody was hurt. The stand-off lasted two hours.
August 26, 2015	Kigali, Rwanda	17-year-old unnamed female student		1 injured	A 17-year-old student stabbed her teacher, Jean Baptiste Gasoma, a chemistry teacher, in the head and arm with a machete. The young student was arrested and her motive is unknown.
September 1, 2015	Hyderabad, India	Suspect	1 dead		A Class 10 student died after a fight with another student at a high school.
September 3, 2015	Georgetown, Texas, United States	Unnamed suspect, 15		1 injured	A 15-year-old was stabbed and injured during a fight at East View High School. Another 15-year-old was arrested.
September 23, 2015	Cape Coral, Florida, United States	Victor Johansson, 17		1 injured	A 17-year-old student was stabbed in the arm with a pocket knife in the parking lot of Mariner High School. A 17-year-old student was arrested.
September 24, 2015	Amadora, Portugal			3 injured	A group of around 20 youths armed with knives and guns invaded the Escola Secundária Seomara da Costa Primo, looking for revenge against a 17-year-old student. A 58-year-old gatekeeper tried to stop the gang from entering the school, he was hit with the butt of a gun in the head and then attacked. The gang also assaulted a 50-year-old teacher. They managed to reach the 17-year-old and brutally kicked and beat him before fleeing the scene. Many of them are believed to attend a school in Cacém. This is the 3rd time an attack happened in this school, as in June 2013 two attacks within 20 days of each other happened, one of them with a death.
September 30, 2015	Greenville, North Carolina, United States	Two students		2 injured	A fight involving two female students at Junius H. Rose High School lead to a student and a teacher being cut with a knife. Two female students were charged in connection with the incident.
September 30, 2015	Harrisburg, South Dakota, United States	Mason Buhl, 16		1 injured	A 16-year-old student allegedly shot a principal in the arm and wounded him during an argument at Harrisburg High School. He was restrained by other school administrators until police arrived. He was indicted on a charges of attempted murder and commission of a felony with a firearm.
October 22, 2015	Trollhättan, Sweden	Anton Lundin Pettersson, 21	4 dead (including the perpetrator)	1 injured	Trollhättan school stabbing. Two were killed and three others, including the perpetrator, were injured in a sword attack at Kronan School. The perpetrator, a 21-year-old man, was shot and wounded by police and later died.On December 3 another victim died from injuries sustained in the attack.The attack was apparently racially motivated.
October 26, 2015	Mercersburg, Pennsylvania, United States	Suspect, 14		1 injured	A 14-year-old student stabbed and injured another student with a knife at James Buchanan High School. The student was charged with attempted homicide.
October 28, 2015	Aberdeen, Scotland, United Kingdom	Suspect, 16	1 dead		A 16-year-old student was stabbed to death at Cults Academy. A fellow student was arrested.
November 5, 2015	Riverside, Georgia, United States	Suspect, 9			At Vereen school, a 9-year-old student was being taken by the campus police officer to the office for misbehaving when the student reached for the Officer's gun holster and fired a shot. No one was injured in the shooting. The boy said he intended to pull the trigger.
November 6, 2015	Sliven, Bulgaria	Unnamed 28-year-old man	1 dead	4 wounded (including the perpetrator)	A 28-year-old man with possible mental problems stabbed another man of the same age at a school. He then entered the high school and fatally stabbed a 15-year-old girl on the stairs. He then went to a classroom and stabbed a 40-year-old teacher. Finally, the man shot himself in the palate with a gas gun, seriously injuring himself.
November 24, 2015	Baltimore, Maryland, United States	Student (charged)	1 dead		A 17-year-old student was stabbed by another student in a classroom at Renaissance Academy High School. He died from his injuries on December 20. Another student was charged and arrested in the attack.
January 22, 2016	La Loche, Saskatchewan, Canada	Student, 17	4 dead	7 injured	La Loche shootings: A former student killed two of his cousins in a house, and then went to La Loche Community School where he killed a teacher and an assistant, and wounded seven other people before being apprehended outside the school.
February 12, 2016	Glendale, Arizona, United States	Dorothy Dutiel, 15	2 dead		A murder–suicide occurred on the grounds of Independence high school, Glendale. Bodies of Dorothy Dutiel and May Kieu were found on the school grounds.The gun was found besides the bodies and police commented that they are not looking for any suspects at this time.The shooting was described by police as an isolated incident.
February 23, 2016	Pickering, Ontario, Canada	Unnamed female student, 14		9 injured	A mass stabbing at Dunbarton High School left six students and three staff members injured. Two of the injured staff members managed to intervene and stop the student from inflicting more harm.
February 29, 2016	Middletown, Ohio, United States	James “Austin” Hancock, 14		4 injured	15-year-old Cameron Smith, and 14-year-old Cooper Caffrey, were shot when 14-year-old James “Austin” Hancock, opened fire in the Madison High School cafeteria with a .380 caliber handgun. 15-year-old Brant Murray, and 14-year-old Katherine Douchette, also suffered shrapnel injuries. Hancock had previous suffered from suicidal thoughts and a stressful home life. He had originally stolen the gun from his great-grandmother house the night before, with no intention of harming others. He returned to his father's house, and brought it to school so that it would not be found while he was away. While at school, he showed it off to friends at the school during lunchtime. When returning to his seat, a girl who had been told about the gun started panicking once she saw Hankcock. This caused Hancock to panic, and fire two rounds at a group of students at a table close by. Hancock fled the school after firing, and was apprehended in a nearby wooded field. When asked why he had opened fire, he responded that it was "So [he] wouldn't have to go back home."
April 23, 2016	Antigo, Wisconsin, United States	Jacob Wagner, 18	1 dead	2 injured	Two students at a prom at Antigo High School were shot and injured by 18-year-old former student Jakob Wagner. Wagner later exchanged fire with a school resource officer in the school's parking lot, and was captured after being shot and wounded by police. He died hours later in a hospital.
September 8, 2016	Alpine, Texas, United States	Female student, 14	1 dead	2 injured	A 14-year-old female freshman student at Alpine High School, who was planning to shoot her step brother at the school, instead shot a 17-year-old junior student in the bathroom, then killed herself. A police officer was also shot in the leg by friendly fire while responding to the incident.
October 18, 2016	San Francisco, California, United States			4 injured	Four students were shot outside June Jordan High School for Equity, a San Francisco public high school. One female victim was in critical condition, while three male victims suffered minor injuries. . Two people were arrested in the shooting.
November 1, 2016	Abbotsford, British Columbia, Canada	Gabriel Klein, 21	1 dead	1 injured	A 21-year-old drifter, Gabriel Klein, randomly stabbed students at Abbotsford Senior Secondary School, killing a 13-year-old girl and wounding another student. Klein was arrested and charged with murder.
November 15, 2016	Orem, Utah, United States	Luke Christian Dollahite, 16		5 injured	A student stabbed and injured five students at random at Mountain View High School. He was arrested and charged with attempted murder.
January 18, 2017	Monterrey, Nuevo Leon, Mexico	Federico Guevara Elizondo, 15	2 dead	3 injured	Colegio Americano del Noreste 2017 shootings: 15-year-old Federico Guevara Elizondo, opened fire in the Colegio Americano del Noreste classroom with a .22 caliber handgun. Federico committed suicide shooting on the cheek, while Ana Cecilia Ramos Luis, Fernando Martinez, both 14 years old and the 24-year-old teacher Cecilia Cristina Solis, suffered serious head injuries; 15-year-old Manuel Chavez suffered an arm injury. Guevara had psychological problems. Teacher Cecilia Cristina Solis died on March 29, 2017, hours after being declared brain dead.
January 20, 2017	West Liberty, Ohio, US	Student, 17		1 injured	A student was shot and injured by another student at West Liberty-Salem High School.
January 27, 2017	Alicante, Spain	17-year-old unnamed student		5 injured	A 17-year-old student and victim of bullying, went to class armed with a knife with which he ended up stabbing 4 of his classmates and injuring his teacher. He was arrested after the stabbing. The incident was repeated in 2023, when a 14-year-old student stabbed 3 teachers and 2 students in a school in Cadiz.
March 15, 2017	San Estanislao, Paraguay	Carlos González, 38		2 injured	The husband of a teacher argued with her at the school and shot at her with .45 caliber handgun. She suffered minor injuries, but the school caretaker suffered serious injuries in his attempt to deter the crime.
March 16, 2017	Grasse, France	Kylian Barbey, 17 (charged)		4 injured	Grasse school shooting. Kylian Barbey, a 17-year-old boy, armed with a rifle, two handguns, a revolver and two grenades opened fire at Alexis de Tocqueville high school. A total of four were injured, three students and the school's principal. Anti-terrorist commandos were sent to the scene and the shooter was arrested. The perpetrator's Facebook and YouTube accounts showed that he was interested in the Columbine Massacre and watched videos on how to make homemade weapons.
March 21, 2017	King City, California, US	17-year-old unnamed male		1 injured	An 18-year-old King City High School student was shot and critically wounded outside the school's auditorium. The gunman ran across the school's campus and baseball field, and fled the area. The school was then placed on lockdown. A suspect was arrested in August 2017.
April 20, 2017	Mwendo, Rwanda	Alice Nyiransabimana		1 injured	Alice Nyiransabimana, after being forced to eat a mandazi known as "Bangiya" by a girl named Mukeshimana, aged 18, and others, took a knife and stabbed Mukeshimana in the arm, causing him to fall on the table. The woman was arrested and the injured man was treated.
June 30, 2017	Nouméa, New Caledonia, France	16-year-old unnamed student		1 injured	A teacher scolded and argued with a 16-year-old CAP carpentry student for not doing anything in class and wrote a note in his notebook to inform his parents. The student left and returned a few minutes later furious, brandishing a small steak knife. He attacked the teacher, who was slightly injured in the thigh. The CAP school in Nouméa has places for up to 850 students and is located in a sensitive area of the city.
September 5, 2017	Ivanteyevka, Russia	Mikhail Pivnev, 15		4 injured	On September 5, 2017, 15-year-old student Mikhail Pivnev opened fire inside his classroom in Ivanteyevka, Russia. He set off several smoke grenades in the classroom before attacking computer science and mathematics teacher Lyubov Kalmykova, 39, with a meat cleaver and shooting her in the head with an air rifle. He then gave some students one minute to flee. Three students were taken to hospital with fractures after jumping from the second floor. Before his attack, he shouted that he wanted to "stage a massacre" and that he "came here to die". He had allegedly planned his attack for three years with the purpose of getting revenge for classmates who offended him. On social media, Pivnev used the pseudonym Mikhail Klebold, relating to Dylan Klebold. On his account, he expressed admiration for Columbine high school massacre perpetrators Dylan Klebold and Eric Harris, as well as Nazi sympathies, and can be seen posing with weapons and giving Nazi salutes in videos. He also expressed suicidal ideation. He was arrested the day of the attack.
September 13, 2017	Rockford, Washington, US	Caleb Sharpe, 15	1 dead	3 injured	A student allegedly opened fire at Freeman High School, killing one and wounding three others. He was arrested afterward.
September 20, 2017	Mattoon, Illinois, US	Student		1 injured	Mattoon High School: A 14-year-old male student was subdued by a female teacher when he attempted to open fire in the school cafeteria at 11:33 a.m. Multiple shots were fired in the process, and one student was struck in the chest and was driven to a nearby hospital suffering non-life-threatening wounds. The student was taken into custody without further incident.
September 26, 2017	Bronx, New York, US	Student	1 dead	1 injured	Abel Cedeno killing incident. A 15-year-old student was stabbed to death and a 16-year-old was critically injured at Urban Assembly School for Wildlife Conservation, a grades 6-12 school. An 18-year-old student was charged with murder. It was speculated that the suspect was bothered by the victims' homophobic comments.
October 14, 2017	Lokichogio, Kenya		7 dead	20 injured	A suspended student led a group of gunmen on a shooting spree at Lokichogio Mixed Secondary School.
October 20, 2017	Goiânia, Goiás, Brazil		2 dead	4 injured	Goyases School Shooting. A 14-year-old eight-grade student opened fire with a .40-caliber handgun at the Goyases College, killing two students and wounding four others. He was arrested.
November 15, 2017	Yuanjiang, Hunan province, China	Student, 16	1 dead		A 47-year-old teacher was stabbed to death by a 16-year-old student at No. 3 High School.
December 7, 2017	Aztec, New Mexico, US	William Atchison, 21	3 dead (including the perpetrator)		2017 Aztec High School shooting. A 21-year-old former Aztec High School student, William Atchison, disguised himself as a student and shot two students to death, and then committed suicide. He was believed by police to have no connections with the victims.
December 12, 2017	Changqing, Hunan province, China	Student, 21	1 dead		A 13-year-old student was fatally stabbed with a sword at Quan Feng Secondary School, by a classmate. It was reported in a news article that the suspect was playing with the classmate before he was apparently accidentally stabbed.
January 19, 2018	Ulan-Ude, Russia	Student, 15		7 injured	Five seventh-graders and their teacher were wounded when a ninth-grader in Buryatia's capital Ulan-Ude, near Lake Baikal in Siberia, attacked them with an axe and burned the classroom with a Molotov cocktail. One student was in critical condition. The attacker was detained and hospitalised after he tried to commit suicide.
January 22, 2018	Italy, Texas	Chad Padilla, 18		1 injured	An 18-year-old male student fired at a 16-year-old female student in the cafeteria of Italy High School. The gunman left the school immediately after opening fire and was arrested. After he was incarcerated, he committed suicide in prison in 2020.
January 22, 2018	New Orleans, Louisiana			1 injured	Shots were fired from a truck in the parking lot of NET Charter High School, targeting a crowd of students during lunch time. One student was slightly injured, apparently from injuries unrelated to gunfire. One person was arrested in connection with the shooting.
January 23, 2018	Benton, Kentucky, US	Gabe Parker, 15 (charged)	2 dead	18 injured	2018 Marshall County High School shooting: A 15-year-old male student shot 16 people in the lobby at Marshall County High School and caused non-gunshot injuries to 4 others. Two 15-year-old students died: one killed at the scene, another died of wounds at Vanderbilt Medical Center.
February 14, 2018	Parkland, Florida, US	Nikolas Cruz, 19	17 dead	17 injured	Stoneman Douglas High School shooting
March 21, 2018	Shadrinsk, Russia	Anna Kargapolova, 13; Natalya Kabakova, 13		7 injured	Seven seventh graders were injured by a gas pistol by their classmate, Anna Kargapolova, and her cousin, eighth grader Natalya Kabakova, in Russia's Kurgan region. The victims suffered bruises and scrapes.
April 18, 2018	Sterlitamak, Russia	Artyom Tagirov, 17		4 injured	Four people were hospitalized after a knife-wielding teenage student attacked his school in Russia's Bashkortostan region, in the city of Sterlitamak. The attacker wounded three girls and a teacher and set a classroom on fire.
April 27, 2018	Shaanxi, China	Zhao Zewei, 28	9 dead	12 injured	Mizhi County middle school stabbing: Nine students were stabbed to death and 12 injured in a knife attack outside a school in northern China. The man who carried out the attack was a former student taking revenge for having been bullied at the school. He was later sentenced to death and executed on 27 September 2018.
May 5, 2018	Mistelbach, Lower Austria, Austria	Mario S.		1 injured	18-year-old Mario S. shot and injured a 19-year-old student standing outside the front of the Federal School Center in Mistelbach, Austria. This was intended to be the start of a mass shooting, styling himself after previous American shooter whom he called “role models”. He particular took inspiration from the Columbine High School shooters, Eric Harris and Dylan Klebold, wearing a dark trench coat during his attack in the same way that they had. However, after firing the initial shot, the Baikal MP18 shotgun he was using as his only weapon malfunctioned, and he was unable to reload or fix it. He dropped the weapon and fled towards Vienna. He was apprehended a few hours later. Mario left behind a manifesto note for his mother at home, writing about his “unhappy life situation” and about seeking revenge against former classmates. He confirmed to police in interrogation that he intended for a mass casualty attack that would end with his suicide. He was give a sentence of six years in prison, and was sent to a mental treatment facility.
May 18, 2018	Santa Fe, Texas, US	Dimitrios Pagourtzis, 17	10 dead	13 injured	Santa Fe High School shooting: student armed with a shotgun and a .38 revolver smuggled under his coat opened fire on Santa Fe High School campus, killing 10 people, many of them his fellow students, and wounding 13 more.
May 25, 2018	Palmdale, California, US			1 injured	A 14-year-old male opened fire with a rifle at roughly 7:00 a.m. at Highland High School campus and walked into a bathroom, and wounded one former schoolmate, a male who was shot in his arm. The suspect who shot 10 rounds, came in custody.
May 25, 2018	Noblesville, Indiana, US	Student, 13		2 injured	2018 Noblesville West Middle School shooting: a person opened fire at 9:06. a.m. at Noblesville West Middle School campus, injured two, an adult and a teenager. After the incident a suspect, came in custody.
October 2, 2018	Vaasa, Finland	Ali Rashid Majeed Majeed, 49		1 injured	49-year-old male student Ali Rashid Majeed Majeed stabbed his 41-year-old ex-wife in the abdomen with a kitchen knife at Vamia Vocational College. According to the police, the act was an attempted honor killing.
February 11, 2019	Stowbtsy, Belarus	Student, 15	2 dead	2 injured	A 15-year-old student stabbed a 50-year-old history teacher in the neck, who then died on the spot. He also stabbed two students, who tried to defend the teacher, injuring both of them. The assailant then left the class and entered a nearby classroom, where he stabbed a 17-year-old student, who also died on the spot.
February 26, 2019	Toronto, Ontario	Unknown		2 injured	During a fight between two students, it ended off with a double stabbing.
March 13, 2019	Suzano, Brazil	Guilherme Taucci Monteiro, 17; Luiz Henrique de Castro, 25	10 dead (including both perpetrators)	11 injured	Suzano massacre: 17-year-old Guilherme Taucci Monteiro and 25-year-old Luiz Henrique de Castro killed Guilherme's uncle in his car store before they shot and killed 5 students and 2 staff members at a public secondary school in Suzano, Brazil. eleven victims were wounded. Monteiro killed Castro and then committed suicide inside the school.
May 6, 2019	Toronto, Ontario	Emmett Carew, 18; Cheddi Itwaroo, 20	1 dead		Carew had an altercation with 17-year-old Brendon Bowler due to a disagreement over the price of Carew's bag of marijuana. The next day, a fight between Carew and Itwaroo against Bowler occurred near Sir Wilfrid Laurier Collegiate Institute. Carew stabbed Bowler once in the chest. Bowler was transported to the hospital where he later died from his injuries. Carew and Itwaroo pleaded guilty to manslaughter, reduced from first-degree murder, with Carew sentenced to 8 years and Itwaroo sentenced to 9 years in prison
May 7, 2019	Colorado, United States	Devon Erickson, 18; Alec Elizabeth, 16	1 dead	8 injured	At the STEM School Highlands Ranch two suspects, who were students at the school, injured eight students and fatally wounded another.
May 13, 2019	Kazan, Russia	Iskander Khalfin, 17		1 injured	A 17-year-old student armed with a BB pistol and a kitchen knife took a class and its teachers hostage in Russia today. Unconfirmed reports say he shot a teacher but missed during the siege of a school in the city of Kazan. A literature teacher negotiated with him to let ten students go and later special services and police persuaded the teenager named by media here as Iskander Khalfin to put down his weapon and surrender. A female teacher, who is in her 60s, was later rushed to hospital because she was reportedly suffering from heart problems at the time of the shooting. Iskander, who suffers from mental problems, said he took the hostage because his crush and classmate rejected him and called him a coward.
May 27, 2019	Puerto Montt, Chile	M. A. C., 14		1 injured	At 8:50 AM, a 14-year-old student dressed in a military-style jacket and a Salvador Dalí mask entered the Patagonia College establishment through an unauthorized access armed with a revolver and 16 bullets. Upon entering his classroom he proceeded to shoot his classmates 3 times, only shooting one on the neck. He immediately fled before being chased down and caught by teachers and was placed under house arrest. Later on, various letters and documents were discovered in his house indicating a much greater planning.
May 28, 2019	Volsk, Saratov Region, Russia	Daniil Pulkin, 15		1 injured	In the afternoon, on May 28, the teenager came to school with a bag with an axe and molotov cocktails inside. First, Pulkin attempted to burn an office of his former form mistress. After that, he hit a 6th grader girl in the head with an axe.
July 11, 2019	Hartford, Connecticut		1 dead		
August 8, 2019	Montgomery, Alabama	Isaiah Johnson, 38			38-year-old Isaiah Johnson dropped his son off at Blount Elementary School got into an argument with another father over a traffic dispute then discharged a firearm into the father's vehicle.
August 24, 2019	Philadelphia, Pennsylvania		1 dead		At the William C. Longsreth elementary school playground, a teenager was shot in the back of the head, and died in the hospital.
August 30, 2019	Mobile, Alabama	Deangelo Dejuan Parnell, 17		10 injured	Parnell shot 9 people during a confrontation at a stadium where a high school football game was being played. A tenth person suffered a stroke.
October 1, 2019	Kuopio, Finland	Joel Marin, 25	1 dead	10 injured	Kuopio school stabbing
October 27, 2019	Laurel, Maryland, USA			1 injured	
November 14, 2019	Santa Clarita, California	Nathaniel Berhow, 16	3 dead	3 injured	2019 Saugus High School shooting
November 14, 2019	Pasadena, California	Unnamed boy, 9.		3 injured	A 9-year-old boy shot three students ages 9 to 12 with a BB gun at the playground of Washington Elementary STEM Magnet School, the classmates received minor injuries. The boy was arrested and then released to his parents
November 15, 2019	Pleasantville, New Jersey	Alvin Wyatt, 31	1 dead	2 injured	Five men opened fire during a playoff game between the Camden Panthers and the Pleasantville Greyhounds at Pleasantville High School, injuring a 15-year-old boy, a 27-year-old male, and fatally injuring a 10-year-old boy. All five were later arrested for the random act of violence however the injured 27 year-old (who is believed to be the shooters target) has also been charged with unlawful possession of a handgun. The alleged shooter Alvin Wyatt has been charged with murder and attempted murder.
November 23, 2019	Union City, California	Two suspects	2 dead		Two boys, aged 11 and 14, were shot in the parking lot of the Seamless Elementary School around 1 am, while sitting in a minivan. Both boys died of their wounds, one at the scene and the other at the hospital. 18-year-old year Jason Cornejo of Castro Valley and a 17-year-old juvenile from Hayward were arrested on February 14, 2020.
November 26, 2019	Salmon Creek, Washington	Keland Hill, 38	2 dead	1 injured	At Sarah J. Anderson Elementary school, Keland Hill shot and killed his wife Tiffany and wounded Tiffany's mother in while Tiffany and Keland's three children were with them while they were in a vehicle in the schools parking lot. Tiffany had a restraining order against Kelan for domestic violence. Keland shot and killed himself after a short car chase with deputies.
December 2, 2019	Waukesha, Wisconsin			1 injured	A 17-year-old male student who brought a handgun to Waukesha South High School was shot by a police officer after pointing his gun at him and was in stable condition. The gun was later determined to be a pellet gun.
December 3, 2019	Oshkosh, Wisconsin	Grant Fuhrman, 16		2 injured	Grant Fuhrman, a 16-year-old male student at Oshkosh High School was shot by resource officer Mike Wissink after stabbing him with a Barbecue fork and was in stable condition. Fuhrman was charged with attempted intentional homicide.
December 19, 2019	Naples, Florida	Jose Alfredo Avila Pena, 56	1 dead		A 28-year-old woman was shot and killed at Lely High School and her shooter, 50-year-old Jose Alfredo Avila Pena who was in a relationship with the victim was charged with second-degree murder. The Principal of the school said the shooting was the result of a domestic violence incident. Pena was sentenced to life in prison.

== See also ==
- List of attacks related to secondary schools (before 2000)
- List of attacks related to secondary schools (2000s)
- List of attacks related to secondary schools (2020s)
- School bullying
- School shooting
- List of school-related attacks
- List of school shootings in the United States (before 2000)
- List of school shootings in the United States (2000–present)
- List of attacks related to primary schools
- List of attacks related to post-secondary schools
- List of rampage killers: School massacres
