= 2023 Jerez de la Frontera school stabbing =

School stabbing incident

Jerez de la Frontera school stabbing
- Location: Elena García Armada Institute in Jerez de la Frontera, Andalusia, Spain
- Date: 28 September 2023
- Target: Students and pupils
- Attack type: Mass stabbing
- Weapon: 2 kitchen knives
- Deaths: 0
- Injuries: 5
- Accused: 14-year-old student

On 28 September 2023, a stabbing occurred at Elena García Armada Institute in Jerez de la Frontera, Andalusia, Spain, when a 14-year-old student stabbed three teachers and two pupils, injuring them using two knives. The suspect was later found in the school and arrested.

== Stabbing ==
At approximately 8:10 a.m., an aggravated teenager entered Elana García Armada Institute and around five minutes later, entered in a classroom retrieved two kitchen knives from his bag and reportedly told a student “I will kill you” before slashing and stabbing at students. A teacher attempted to intervene and sustained serious eye injuries that required surgery, another teacher was injured while attempted to aid the other one.

Police entered the school and arrested a 14-year-old boy on suspicion of the stabbing, he was found carrying two knives on the third floor of the building.

== Accused ==
A 14-year-old boy was arrested on the third floor of the school carrying the two knives in suspicion of the stabbing. The boy required special education, classmates described him as a calm person who “didn’t talk often” and reported that in the days before the attack he had suffered from an unspecified incident and that other classmates would make jokes about him.

== See also ==
- Lists of school-related attacks
- Barcelona school killing
