= 2024 Azambuja school stabbing =

2024 school attack in Portugal

- Location: 39.073768°N 8.876754°W; Azambuja Primary and Secondary School, Azambuja, Lisbon District, Portugal
- Date: September 17, 2024 c. 2:30 p.m. (WEST; UTC+01:00)
- Target: Students and staff
- Attack type: Mass stabbing
- Weapon: Knife
- Deaths: 0
- Injuries: 6
- Perpetrators: 12-year-old boy
- Motive: Unknown

On September 17, 2024, a 12-year-old boy carried out a knife attack at Azambuja Primary and Secondary School (Portuguese: Escola Básica 1,2 E 3 Da Azambuja) in Azambuja, Lisbon District, Portugal. Six children were injured. No deaths were reported.

Authorities believe the attacker was influenced by Nazi ideology.

== Stabbing ==
The attack happened after an argument. The boy went home and then came back. The incident took place around 2:30 p.m. The 12-year-old attacker brought a hidden bulletproof vest and a knife in his backpack to school. He walked onto the school grounds, put on the vest (which belonged to his father), and started stabbing people. The perpetrator was detained at the scene.

=== Victims ===
Five girls suffered light wounds to their arms. One boy was seriously injured in the chest. None of the injuries were life-threatening. All the victims were between 11 and 14 years old.

== Aftermath ==
Portuguese Prime Minister Luís Montenegro condemned the attack and wished the injured children a quick recovery. He called the incident extremely rare for his country. Security has also been increased at the school entrance.

== Perpetrator ==
The perpetrator was a seventh-grade student who was 12 years old at the time of the attack. He is the son of a teacher from another school and comes from a complete family. The boy had been looking at websites about Nazi ideology for some time. Because of his age, he will not face criminal charges. The court placed him in an educational center.

== See also ==
- List of attacks related to primary schools
- List of attacks related to secondary schools (2020s)
- List of mass stabbing incidents (2020–present)
- List of mass stabbings by death toll
- 2024 in Portugal
