= 2025 Nantes school stabbing =

Mass stabbing in Nantes, France

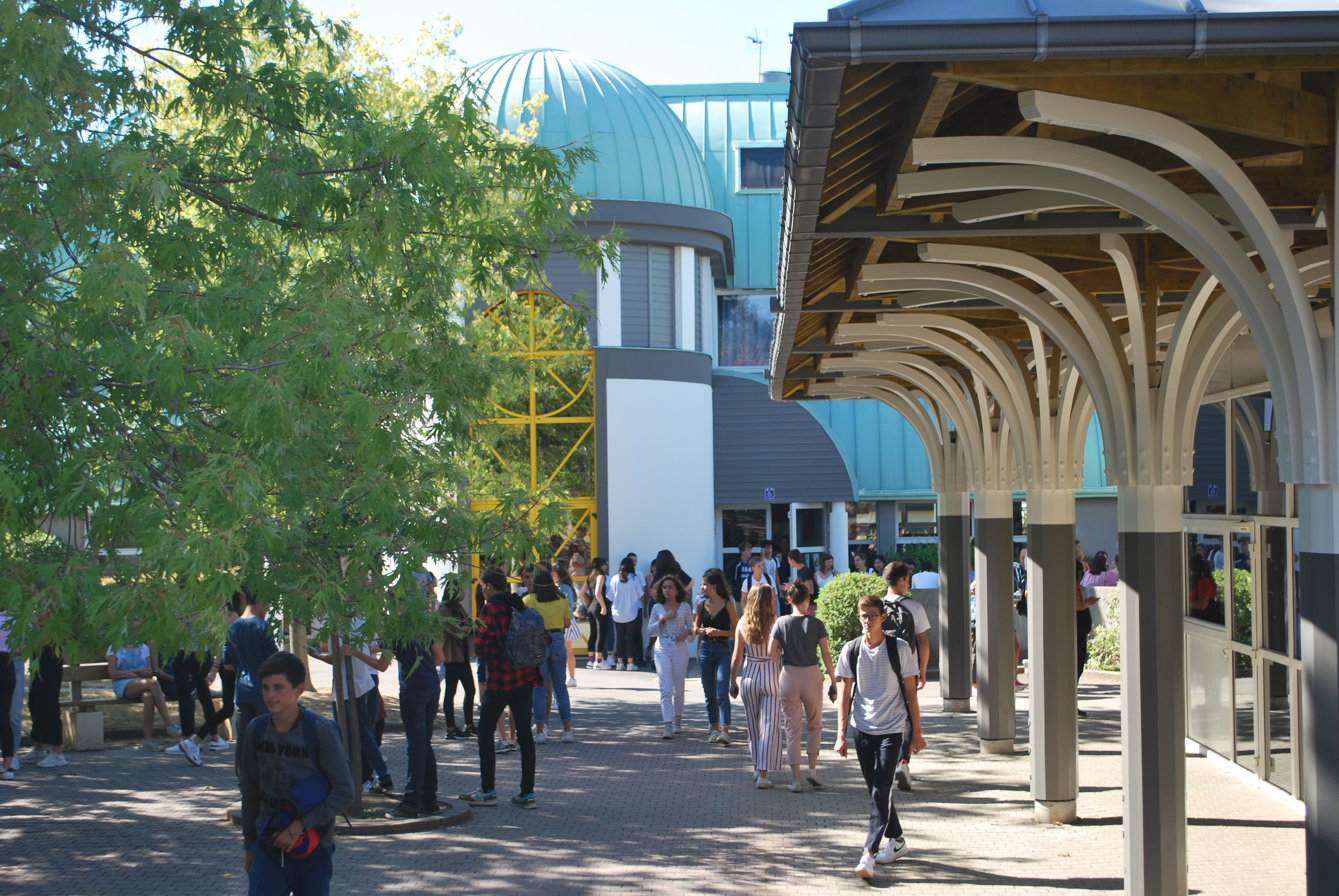
- Our Lady of All Helps High School, the site of the stabbing, in 2019
- Location: 47.228°N 1.519°W; Our Lady of All Helps High School in Nantes, France
- Date: 24 April 2025; 12:30 – 3:30 p.m.
- Target: Students of Our Lady of All Helps High School
- Attack type: Mass stabbing
- Weapons: Hunting knife and folding knife
- Deaths: 1
- Injuries: 4 (including the perpetrator)
- Accused: 15-year-old male student

On 24 April 2025, a teenage girl was killed and three students were wounded in a mass stabbing at a private secondary school, Our Lady of All Helps High School (Note: French: Notre-Dame-de-Toutes-Aides) in Nantes, Loire-Atlantique, France. The suspected attacker was a 15-year-old male student and was arrested by law enforcement at the scene, after being restrained by a teacher.

Following the arrest, the suspect was put into the custody of a psychiatric hospital and examined by a psychiatrist, where he was deemed "incompatible with police custody". The court said the perpetrator was a loner who had suicidal tendencies and classmates described him as having an interest in extremism.

The stabbing occurred following previous incidents of knife violence in schools in the country and sparked discussion in regard to increasing school security, which Prime Minister François Bayrou called for following the incident.

== Background ==
Our Lady of All Helps High School is part of a complex that features a primary and middle school, which houses 2,000 pupils.

Knife attacks in schools have become a sensitive issue in France after a series of incidents, including the 2020 murder and decapitation of a teacher in Eragny-sur-Oise and the fatal stabbing of a teacher by a student at a private school in Saint-Jean-de-Luz in February 2023. Bag searches by law enforcement at the entrance of schools had already been implemented in some areas.

After the March death of a 17-year-old outside of a school in Essonne, Interior Minister Bruno Retailleau and Education Minister Élisabeth Borne called for random weapon checks around schools. It is unclear whether any increased security operations are already underway across France. Borne reported a 15% increase in reports of the use of bladed weapons in schools in one year.

== Stabbing ==
At approximately 12:30 p.m., the attacker entered the school armed with at least one knife. He killed a 15-year-old girl on the second floor after stabbing her 57 times before going to the first floor and stabbing three other students, wounding them.

The school was evacuated and emergency services were deployed to the school, as well as Army officers. A suspect was arrested by law enforcement at the scene after being restrained by a teacher. The suspect was bleeding from minor wounds to his forehead and left hand and asked an officer to "shoot him in the head".

Eyewitness accounts described pupils running through the school, and others confined to classrooms after an alarm was set off. The school administration alerted families of pupils of the situation and authorities assisted students in leaving the site at 3:30 p.m., as some parents and families of pupils waited nearby.

A hunting knife and folding knife were found in the suspect's possession as well as a fake gun in his backpack. Ouest France reported that the attacker was dressed all in black, and wore a helmet and balaclava. Het Nieuwsblad reported that the suspect wore steel-toe boots, sunglasses and headphones.

== Victims ==
The killed victim of the stabbing was identified by Le Monde as Lorène (Note: Lorène's surname has not been released by sources.), a 15-year-old female student. Two of the injured students were left in a critical condition and taken to the hospital of the University of Nantes, whilst the third injured student was left with minor injuries. On April 26, one of the victims with more serious injuries was reported as no longer being in life-threatening danger.

== Aftermath ==
After the incident, psychological support was put in place for students and teachers. Retailleau and Borne visited the scene to show solidarity with the community. Also following the incident, the Ministry of National Education reported that 958 random bag checks conducted in schools had led to the seizure of 94 knives.

== Investigation ==
A police spokesman said there was no indication of a terrorist motive behind the stabbing, and the counterterrorism prosecutor's office confirmed that it was investigating the case.

=== Suspect ===
A 15-year-old male pupil of Notre-Dame-de-Toutes-Aides, born in Saint-Herblain, was arrested by law enforcement at the scene after being restrained by a teacher. Police told French newspaper Le Monde that the suspect was not previously known to the police or security services. Following the arrest, he was put into the custody of a psychiatric hospital and examined by a psychiatrist, where he was deemed "incompatible with police custody". The court said the perpetrator was a loner who had suicidal tendencies.

Students at the school revealed they had received emails from the suspect which had been sent to the entire school. According to Le Parisien, the suspect has suicidal tendencies and sent a 13-page document described as a manifesto titled Immune Action. The document advocated environmentalism, anti-industrialism and anti-globalism, "denouncing the state of the world", particularly "systemic violence" and "social alienation", writing that society is an "immense conditioning operation" aimed at "rendering human beings docile, predictable and programmable."

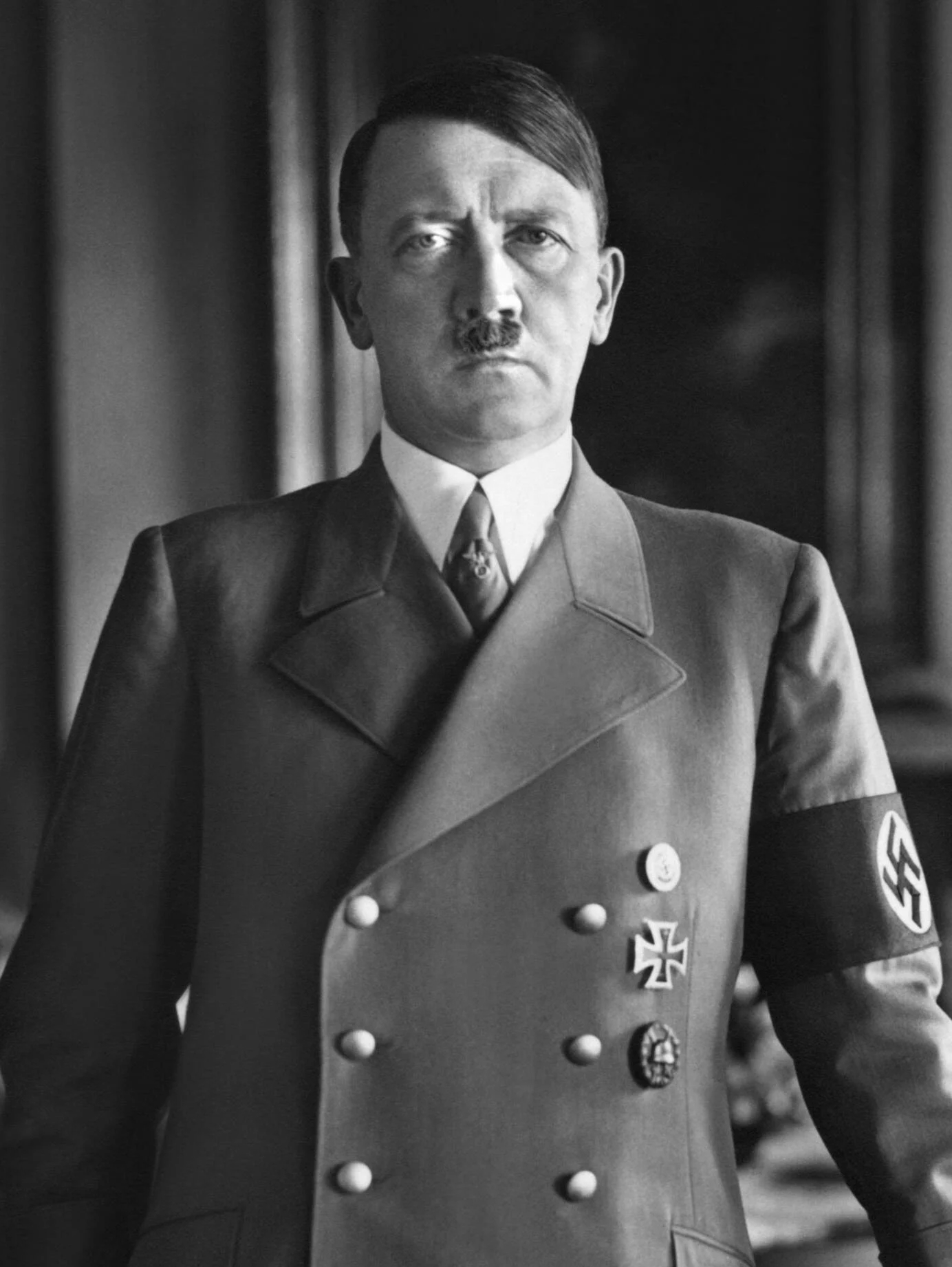
Classmates said that the suspect followed neo-Nazi groups on social media and "loved Hitler".

Classmates said that the suspect had been "acting strangely" since the beginning of the year, that he was "known to be depressed", followed neo-Nazi groups on social media and "loved Hitler". A female classmate of the suspect told reporters that the suspect expressed sympathy toward Nazism and that he "wanted to bring back the Nazi ideas of Hitler". Students told BFM TV he may have killed the girl because she did not want to be in a relationship with him and that she rejected him on a school field trip.

The suspect reportedly spent time in forests with airsoft gear and a knife. A friend of the suspect said he regularly talked about pollution and topics relating to extremism, including the September 11 attacks, jihadism, Nazism and The Diary of a Young Girl by Holocaust victim Anne Frank. He also said the suspect warned a Snapchat group he was in two days prior to the attack that "it would be the last time they see him". The friend also stated that they were grew fearful of the suspect after he had said to him that it "seems incredible to hijack a plane" and to fly one without training, when speaking of the September 11 attacks.

== Reactions ==
Later the same day, French president Emmanuel Macron expressed his condolences on X (formerly Twitter) and praised teachers at the scene, writing "I extend my heartfelt thoughts to the families, the high school students, and the entire educational community, whose shock and grief the nation shares. Through their intervention, teachers undoubtedly prevented further tragedies. Their courage commands respect."

Prime Minister François Bayrou called for an "intensification" of checks for knives in schools. Interior Minister Bruno Retailleau told news reporters at the scene: "This tragedy is not a news item, it is a social phenomenon."

Marine Le Pen of the National Rally party, which focuses on security as part of its policy, wrote on social media that: "It is more than time to take the necessary measures to eradicate the banalization of the extreme violence which is ravaging the heart of our schools".

== See also ==
- 2025 in France
- 2023 Arras school stabbing
- Grasse school shooting
- 2014 Nantes attack and Dupont de Ligonnès murders and disappearance, other notable crimes in Nantes
- List of attacks related to secondary schools
- List of mass stabbing incidents (2020–present)
