= Killing of Yang Cheng-hsun =

Crime in Taiwan

- Location: Tucheng District, New Taipei City, Taiwan, Republic of China
- Date: December 25, 2023; Noon (National Standard Time)
- Attack type: Stabbing
- Weapon: Switchblade
- Victim: Yang Cheng-hsun
- Perpetrators: Guo and Lin
- Motive: Guo seeking revenge for his "sworn sister" Lin
- Accused: Guo and Lin
- Charges: Homicide
- Convictions: 12 years imprisonment (Guo), 11 years imprisonment (Lin)

On December 25, 2023, a fatal stabbing occurred at a junior high school in Tucheng District, New Taipei City, Taiwan (Republic of China). A ninth-grade student, identified by the surname Guo, attacked a ninth-grade student Yang Cheng-hsun (Chinese: 楊承勳) from a neighboring class with a switchblade. Yang was stabbed ten times and later died from his injuries.

== Incident ==
On December 25, 2023, during the noon lunch break, a female student surnamed Lin went to the classroom of a male student surnamed Yang to speak with another female classmate. When Lin left the classroom, she reportedly slammed the door forcefully, prompting Yang to remind her to be more careful with school property. Upset by the remark, Lin returned to her own class and sought support from her "sworn brother", a male student surenamed Guo, along with other classmates.

Guo and several students then confronted Yang, and the situation escalated from a verbal dispute into a physical altercation. During the confrontation, Guo produced a concealed switchblade and attacked Yang, stabbing him in the neck and chest. The wounds caused severe blood loss, and Yang lost consciousness (Note: There were claims on social media that a classmate was injured while trying to block the knife, but police subsequently clarified that only Yang was sent to the hospital and the blocking incident was an online fabrication.).

When paramedics arrived, Yang was found to be unresponsive, without breathing or a pulse, as a result of massive blood loss. He was transported to Far Eastern Memorial Hospital for emergency treatment. Hospital staff placed him on extracorporeal membrane oxygenation (ECMO) and performed emergency surgery. Although Yang briefly regained vital signs during treatment, he was pronounced dead on the evening of December 26 (Note: Some sources state the ICU emergency treatment lasted 36 hours.).

The Education Department of the New Taipei City Government confirmed Yang's death on the morning of December 27.

== Investigation ==
The Tucheng Precinct of the New Taipei City Police Department brought Guo and the alleged instigator Lin for questioning. At approximately 11:00 p.m. on December 25, 2023, both were transferred to the Juvenile Court of the New Taipei District Court on suspicion of attempted murder. Following a hearing, the court ordered that Guo be placed in detention, while Lin was released into the custody of her legal guardian.

After Yang was pronounced dead on December 26, media reports indicated that prosecutors intended to upgrade Guo's charge from attempted murder to homicide; however, the New Taipei District Prosecutors Office denied this claim. Suspecting that Lin had used a mobile phone to collude with witnesses, police sought a summons and search warrant from the New Taipei District Court, but the requests were denied on two occasions. On January 4, 2024, following media coverage, Lin voluntarily appeared at a police station accompanied by legal counsel to provide a statement. On January 8, the Juvenile Court ordered Lin to be placed in detention.

On March 21, 2024, the Juvenile Court ruled to transfer both Guo and Lin to the New Taipei District Prosecutors Office for further investigation. On April 12, prosecutors applied for detention incommunicado, citing concerns that the suspects posed risks of evidence destruction, collusion, or flight, and noting that the alleged offenses carried minimum sentences exceeding five years’ imprisonment. The Juvenile Court approved the request.

On May 9, prosecutors formally indicted Lin and Guo on charges of homicide. The Prosecutors Office stated that, in accordance with the Juvenile Justice Act and related regulations, no press release, indictment documents, or further case details would be made public. On the morning of May 14, both defendants, along with their case files, were transferred to the Juvenile Court for trial, where the court ordered that they remain detained incommunicado.

=== Judgment ===
On the morning of September 30, 2024, the Taiwan New Taipei District Court issued its first-instance verdict, sentencing Guo to nine years' imprisonment and Lin to eight years' imprisonment. The New Taipei District Prosecutors Office stated that it considered the sentences too lenient and announced its intention to appeal.

On December 23, 2025, the Taiwan High Court delivered its second-instance verdict. The appellate panel overturned the lower court’s ruling, convicted both defendants of homicide, and sentenced Guo to 12 years' imprisonment and Lin to 11 years' imprisonment. The judgment remains subject to further appeal. Following the ruling, the victim’s family expressed dissatisfaction, describing the sentences as overly lenient, and staged a protest outside the court criticizing what they viewed as excessive judicial protection of perpetrators.

== Reactions ==
School authorities

The school stated that there was no prior conflict between the perpetrator and the victim and described the incident as an isolated case. On December 26, the school initiated in-class psychological counseling for the two affected classes and relocated them to different classrooms. On December 27, the school announced a temporary suspension of public access to the campus.

Media

According to media reports, the perpetrator Guo had a prior record for assault and had been released from the Taipei Juvenile Detention House in May. Reports also stated that he had brought knives to school on multiple occasions. Guo additionally claimed affiliation with the Celestial Way Sun Chapter and the Huashan Gang. Both organizations publicly denied his membership and issued "permanent bans" to distance themselves from him.

Political responses

President Tsai Ing-wen expressed "her deepest condolences to the deceased student and his family".

During the third televised policy presentation of the 2024 Taiwanese presidential election, candidates Lai Ching-te (Democratic Progressive Party), Hou Yu-ih (Kuomintang), and Ko Wen-je (Taiwan People's Party) all commented on the incident.

Minister of Education Pan Wen-chung stated that he would consider evaluating the need for an increase in school security personnel.

=== Families of the parties involved ===
In a statement released through the school, the victim's family expressed firm opposition to the abolition of the death penalty and called on the government to review and amend relevant juvenile justice laws and related measures.

The father of the male defendant, Guo, stated: "I hope my son will be detained and locked up."

The parents of the female defendant, Lin, stated: "Our daughter feels aggrieved; she only went to complain to her 'sworn brother' and did not know it would turn out this way," and added that "she is already reflecting on her actions."

=== Government agencies ===
Ministry of Health and Welfare

The Ministry of Health and Welfare stated that spreading articles, photos, or data regarding the juvenile involved in the slashing violates Article 69 of the "Protection of Children and Youths Welfare and Rights Act", punishable by a fine between NT$30,000 and NT$150,000.

Education Department, New Taipei City Government

The Education Department dispatched social workers from the Counseling Center to provide psychological counseling to students and homeroom teachers of 12 ninth-grade classes.

Taiwan New Taipei District Court

The Taiwan New Taipei District Court stated that netizens doxxing and posting articles and photos of the involved juveniles on social media platforms like Dcard and PTT violates Article 83 of the "Juvenile Justice Act".

=== Social organizations ===
The Taiwan Alliance to End the Death Penalty responded to the incident stating "violence cannot stop violence," and issued three appeals: "severe punishment does not help reduce crime," "maintain the non-public nature of investigations to protect minors," and "emphasize psychological counseling mechanisms".

== See also ==
- Yeh Yung-chih incident
