= 2017 Grasse school shooting =

Mass shooting in Grasse, France

- Alexis de Tocqueville high school
- Native name: Fusillade au lycée Alexis de Tocqueville
- Location: Grasse, Provence-Alpes-Côte d'Azur, France
- Date: 16 March 2017; 12:37 p.m. – 1:05 p.m. (CET UTC+1)
- Attack type: Mass shooting; school shooting; attempted murder; Columbine copycat crime
- Weapons: Pump-action shotgun; Two revolvers; Improvised grenades (one unused, other failed to detonate)
- Deaths: 0
- Injuries: 14 (4 directly)
- Perpetrator: Killian Barbey
- Motive: Personal grievances
- Accused: Killian Barbey (accused gunman); Lucas R. (failing to report threat)
- Charges: Barbey: Attempted murder (4 counts); Lucas R.: Accessory to attempted murder
- Sentence: Unknown (Note: Possibly 20 years imprisonment for Barbey; see § Legal proceedings)

On 16 March 2017, at approximately 12:30 p.m. at the Alexis de Tocqueville high school (French: Lycée Alexis de Tocqueville) in the town of Grasse, France, a mass shooting occurred when a student opened fire, injuring four people. The attacker also use one of two homemade grenades during the attack, which failed to detonate.

The incident was the first mass school shooting in France since the Ozar Hatorah school shooting in 2012. Unlike the 2012 killings, committed by someone with no connection to the school, the identified perpetrator was a pupil at the school itself.

== Background ==
Since November 2015, the entire nation of France had been in a state of emergency after a string of deadly Islamic terror attacks across the country, including the 2015 Paris attacks and 2016 Nice truck attack. This resulted in the implementation of a warning system, which was designed to alert people of attacks quickly.

=== Suspect ===
The suspect of the shooting was identified as 16-year-old Killian Barbey. Born in November of 2000, he is the son of municipal councilor Frank Barbey, who was reportedly considered right-wing. Both his grandfather and father held firearm licenses, and were in possession of firearms.

Barbey allegedly began to be bullied after beginning enrolment at Alexis de Tocqueville high school. He eventually became friends with two twins named Anthony and Lucas R. Both Lucas' and Barbey's Facebook accounts show an interest in mass murder, including the Columbine High School massacre. An alleged Twitter account of Barbey's also retweeted a post about the 2016 Nice truck attack.

A few weeks prior to the shooting, Barbey reportedly had an argument with several pupils at his school. It is unknown whether any of these students were targeted in the shooting. He began posting strange photos to Facebook following this, including himself wearing a clown mask and holding an imitation firearm, as well as a photo from Hatred.

=== Day of the shooting ===
According to students at the Alexis de Tocqueville high school, the suspect was present as usual the morning of Thursday, 16 March 2017, however he left earlier than usual following another argument between him and other students. He then went to the home of Anthony and Lucas, where the attack was possibly planned. Following this, the suspect armed himself with his grandfather's hunting rifle, his father's two handguns, and two homemade grenades, before leaving for the high school. He arrived at approximately 12:30 p.m., with the attack beginning shortly afterward.

== The shooting ==
After returning to the school, Barbey reportedly searched for specific students in a classroom, but was unable to locate them. At 12:37 p.m., Barbey allegedly found two of the students he was searching for, and opened fire. The two students were injured, whilst several others were injured in the ensuing stampede as the school's pupils went into panic. Shortly after the initial reports of gunfire, the warning system was issues to people in and around the school, saving lives in the process.

Before he was able to find another of his targets, the caretaker of the school, Pascal Baudesson, attempted to talk the shooter out of continuing the attack. In an interview with France 2, Baudesson claimed that he told the shooter to surrender, to which he replied "I haven't finished solving my problem yet." The shooter then threw one of his grenades at Baudesson, which failed to detonate. The shooter eventually came across another of his targets, shooting him in the stomach.

Following this, the principal of the school, Hervé Pizzinat, attempted to talk the shooter down. This resulted in him being shot in the shoulder and arm. Despite this, he would continue to attempt to calm the shooter down until RAID units arrived, arresting the shooter without incident.

=== Aftermath ===
Initial reports surrounding the shooting were inconsistent, possibly due to the language barrier. Many news articles such as CBS News claimed that only three victims had been shot, whilst The Standard claimed that a second shooter was still at large. Meanwhile, the victims who were shot were treated and soon described as stable, whilst ten others were treated for minor indirect injuries and shock.

Due to previous attacks, and an unrelated letter bomb incident at the International Monetary Fund office in Paris that occurred hours earlier, there was speculation that the shooting was terror related. However, it was later stated that "no link" to terrorism was established. Psychological support was offered to students upon their return to the school. President Francois Hollande would claim that the shooting showed the current state of emergency in France was necessary.

== Legal proceedings ==
In the days following Barbey's arrest, Lucas, and Anthony were also arrested in connection to the shooting, however Anthony was later determined to have had no knowledge of Barbey's plans. Barbey was charged with four counts of attempted murder, and Lucas charged for failing to report Barbey's intentions.

Following a three year wait, the trial of Kilian Barbey and Lucas R. was set to begin on 3 March 2020. The two boys were defended by Éric Dupond-Moretti. Barbey would face up to 20 years imprisonment if found guilty. However, the day before the trial was to begin, Moretti was arrested whilst participating in a strike resulting in the trial being postponed. At the same time, the COVID-19 pandemic would begin, resulting in further delays.

A month after the delay, Barbey and Lucas would reach their three-year detention limit without being charged, meaning that they would have to be released by French law. Barbey would be released under judicial observation, and under the condition that he could not return to the Alpes-Maritimes area. A new trial was set to begin in 2021, however it appears as if this trial took place discreetly away from the media, as no information is available surrounding it.

== See also ==
- 2025 Nantes school stabbing
- 2023 Arras school stabbing
