= 2015 Barcelona school attack =

School attack in Spain

- Location: 41.42°N 2.19°E; Barcelona, Catalonia, Spain
- Date: 20 April 2015; 9:20 – 9:40
- Attack type: Stabbing, slashing, crossbow attack, attempted arson
- Weapons: Crossbow; Machete; Molotov cocktails (unused)
- Deaths: 1
- Injuries: 4
- Perpetrator: 13-year-old student
- Motive: Psychotic break

On 20 April 2015, a 13-year-old carried out an attack at his high school, IES Joan Fuster, in Barcelona, Catalonia, Spain, killing one teacher and injuring four others. The student was armed with a crossbow and a machete, Upon arriving at school, he began shooting in a class with the crossbow and attacking students and staff with a machete, resulting in a teacher being killed and two students and another teacher being injured. The attack is the first school attack in Spain where a teacher was killed.

== Background ==
While the attack was the first documented case of a fatal school attack in Spain, there had been a previous, unsuccessful planned school attack, when in October 2012, agents of the National Police Corps arrested a young man in Palma de Mallorca was arrested and was found to have been plotting to bomb University of the Balearic Islands with 140 kilograms of explosives (that he had acquired on the internet), in a copycat crime trying to emulate the Columbine massacre. The earliest documented case of a murder on school grounds in recent Spanish history occurred in October of 2003, when three Dominican migrants stabbed a Colombian student to death at the gates of the Instituto Sant Josep de Calassanç located in Barcelona. On 28 April 2005, the youths were sentenced to 17 years in prison and €190,000 in compensation for the charge of murder with malice aforethought.

== Attack ==
The student shot a Spanish-language teacher in the face and shot the daughter of the teacher in the leg with a modified crossbow using homemade projectiles. 35-year-old Abel Martínez Oliva, a substitute teacher, confronted the student and was fatally stabbed or slashed in the chest with the machete. The student then stabbed or slashed another student in the leg before he was confronted by the school's physical education teacher, David Jurado Fernández.

According to Jurado, he found the student in the second-floor classroom with a knife, a crossbow, a backpack, and manipulating a beer bottle to make a Molotov cocktail. Jurado then told the student that he was hurting more people than he realized and asked him to show him what he had in his backpack. The student did, then collapsed in tears into Jurado's arms. Jurado then sat with the student in the classroom until the police arrived.

== Victims ==
One teacher, Abel Martínez Oliva, was killed in the attack, and four others were injured. Martínez was a substitute teacher who had only recently begun working at the school. Two additional teachers and two students were also injured in the attacks. None of the injured victims were reported to have been seriously injured. Martínez was posthumously honoured for protecting students and other teachers during the attack with the Civil Order of Alfonso X, the Wise by the Council of Ministers following a request from the minister of education, vocational training and sports José Ignacio Wert.

== Perpetrator ==
The perpetrator was identified as a 13-year-old student of the same school. After the attack, the suspect's classmates and close friends said that he "was a withdrawn boy who had academic problems". They, along with most other people, claimed a "blacklist" which included twenty people's names who he wanted to kill, was drafted by the perpetrator. Police were not able to locate said blacklist. The perpetrator's room was searched, where various weapons were found: Three toy crossbows, two air rifles, and another machete, along with a floorplan of the institute.

== Aftermath ==
The attack was noted to have occurred on 20 April, the anniversary of the Columbine High School massacre at Columbine High School in Columbine, Colorado, United States. The Minister of Education said that the boy was admitted and assessed at the Sant Joan de Déu hospital, where he was diagnosed with having a psychotic break.

According to Article 19 of the Criminal Code, being a minor (18 years in Spain) "will not be criminally responsible," however, says that in case of committing a crime, he could be liable as appropriate to the law of the minor. However, since he was under 14, the young man was exempt from responsibility. While the civil responsibility would usually go to his legal guardians, in this case, since the attack occurred on school grounds, the Barcelona Education Consortium was held responsible, and had to compensate victims for €1 million.

David Jurado, the teacher who managed to talk out the perpetrator from committing further actions, later wrote a book to be privately shared with students and victims of the attack.
