= Columbine High School massacre copycat crimes =

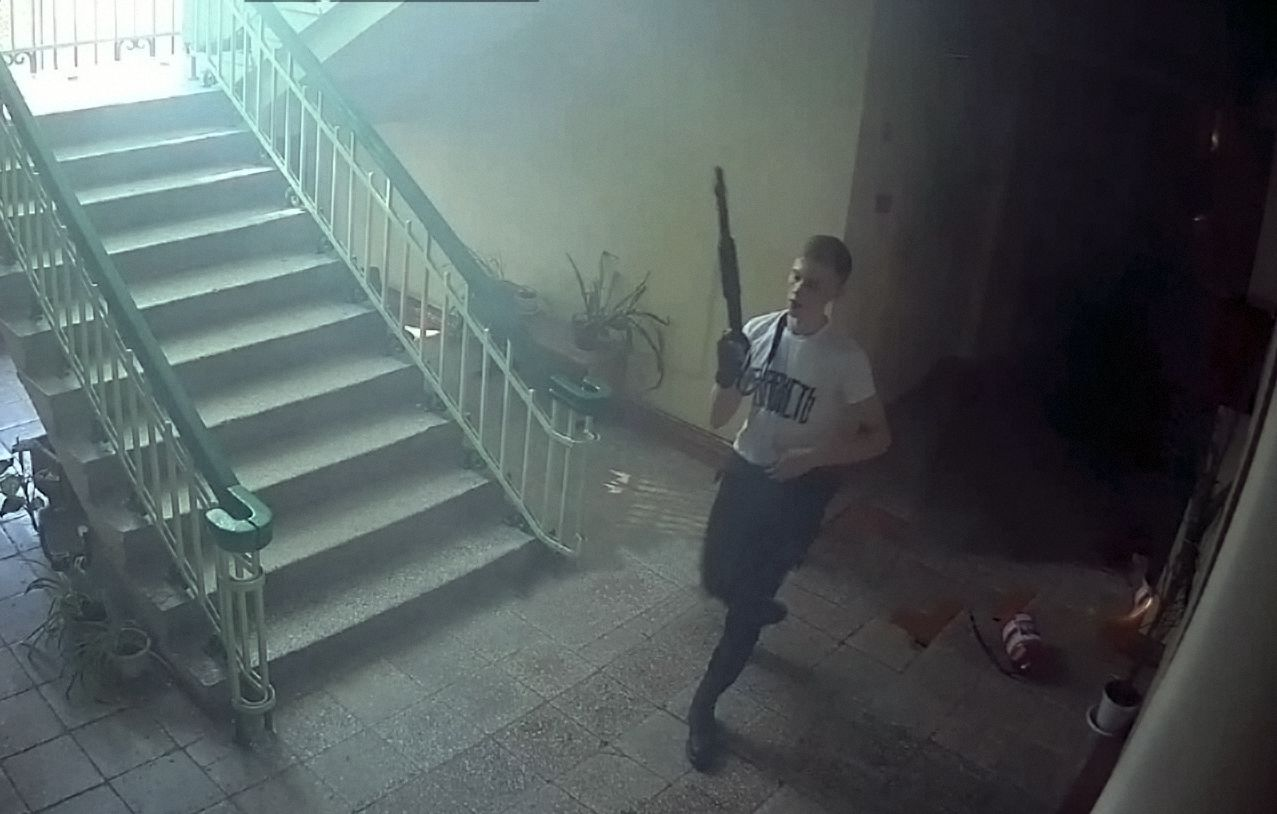
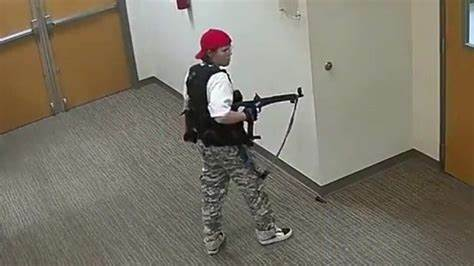
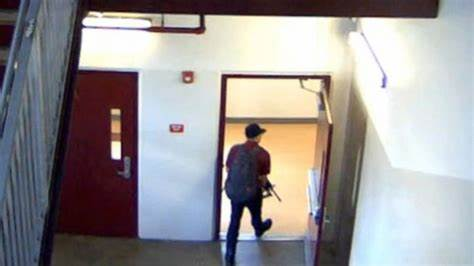
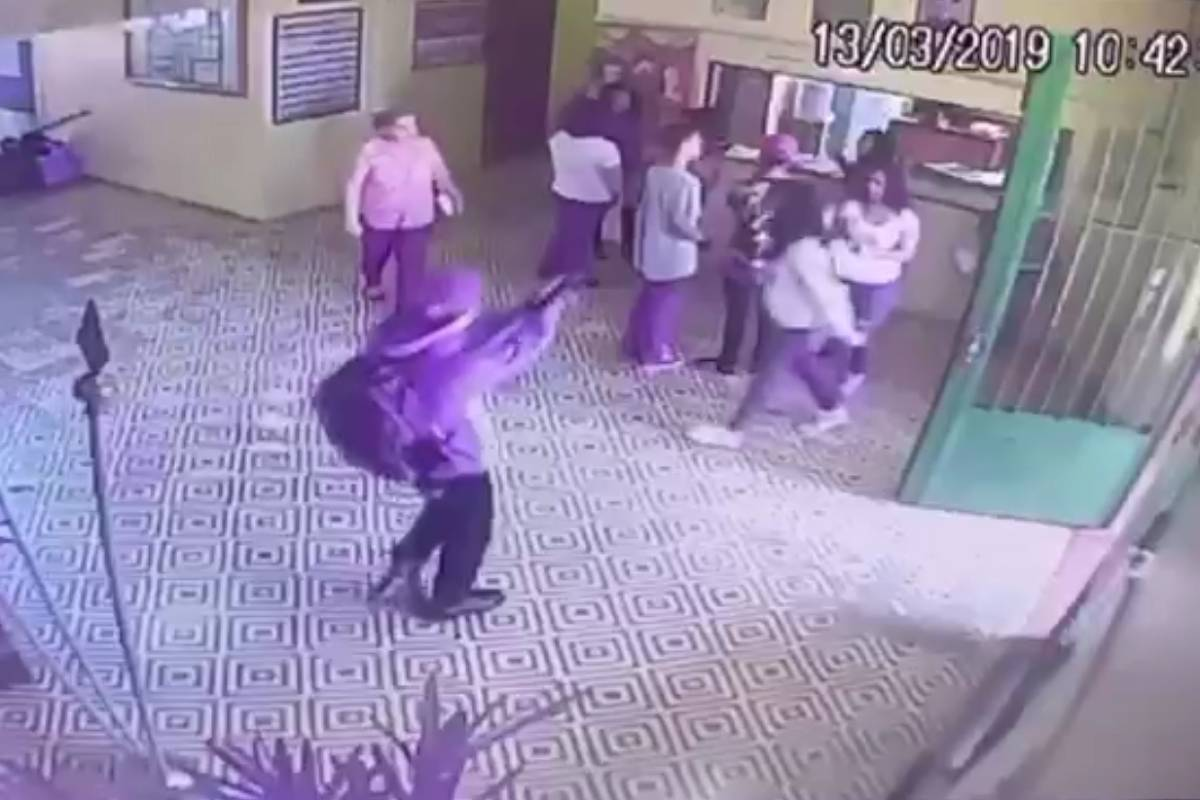
Clockwise from top left: CCTV footage of the Kerch Polytechnic College massacre; CCTV footage of the 2023 Nashville school shooting; CCTV footage of the Suzano massacre; CCTV footage of the Parkland high school shooting; all of which were inspired by the Columbine massacre and collectively left 51 victims dead.

Over 300 deaths have been attributed to copycat attacks inspired by the April 1999 Columbine High School massacre. A list below shows all confirmed attacks with roots from Columbine. List does not include the perpetrator unless the perpetrator is the sole victim. Foiled planned attacks with inspiration from the massacre, like the Halifax mass shooting plot and suicides of those with relation to the Columbine massacre, like Sol Pais, are not included in the list.

== Analysis ==
Perpetrators Eric Harris and Dylan Klebold have become what the Napa Valley Register has called "cultural icons" for troubled youth. According to psychiatrist E. Fuller Torrey of the Treatment Advocacy Center, a legacy of the Columbine shootings is its "allure to disaffected youth".

Sociologist Ralph Larkin examined twelve major school shootings in the US in the following eight years and found that in eight of those, "the shooters made explicit reference to Harris and Klebold". Larkin wrote that the Columbine massacre established a "script" for shootings. "Numerous post-Columbine rampage shooters referred directly to Columbine as their inspiration; others attempted to supersede the Columbine shootings in body count."

A 2015 investigation by CNN identified "more than 40 people...charged with Columbine-style plots". A 2014 investigation by ABC News identified "at least 17 attacks and another 36 alleged plots or serious threats against schools since the assault on Columbine High School that can be tied to the 1999 massacre." Ties identified by ABC News included online research by the perpetrators into the Columbine shooting, clipping news coverage and images of Columbine, explicit statements of admiration of Harris and Klebold, such as writings in journals and on social media, in video posts, (Note: In 2012, sociologist Nathalie E. Paton of the National Center for Scientific Research in Paris analyzed the videos created by post-Columbine school shooting perpetrators. A recurring set of motifs was found, including explicit statements of admiration and identification with previous perpetrators. Paton said the videos serve the perpetrators by distinguishing themselves from their classmates and associating themselves with the previous perpetrators.) and in police interviews, timing planned to an anniversary of Columbine, plans to exceed the Columbine victim counts, and other ties.

In 2015, Canadian journalist Malcolm Gladwell writing in The New Yorker magazine proposed a threshold model of school shootings in which Harris and Klebold were the triggering actors in "a slow-motion, ever-evolving riot, in which each new participant's action makes sense in reaction to and in combination with those who came before."

In February 2016, after Klebold's mother, Sue Klebold, spoke out on mental health and suicide prevention in an interview with Diane Sawyer, then-Attorney General of Colorado, Cynthia Coffman, tweeted that Klebold's interview had been "irresponsible and inflammatory, that Klebold had been "selfish", and that her interview could have "very negative consequences". Ted Zocco-Hochhalter, whose daughter Anne-Marie Hochhalter was a Columbine student paralyzed in the attack, countered that Klebold, as a remorseful mother, was productively sparking awareness on mental issues. Mental health organizations echoed Zocco-Hochhalter's remarks. The day before the interview, Anne-Marie Hochhalter had addressed a social media post to Sue Klebold, saying: "I have forgiven you".

== List ==
Date	Location	Attacker(s)	Dead	Injured	Description
April 28, 1999	Taber, Alberta, Canada	Todd Cameron Smith	1	1	W. R. Myers High School shooting: This was the first documented Columbine copycat attack. The gunman, 14-year-old school dropout Todd Cameron Smith, reportedly "snapped" after watching news coverage about the Columbine High School massacre.
May 20, 1999	Conyers, Georgia, United States	Anthony "T.J." Solomon	0	6	Heritage High School shooting: A month to the day after the Columbine High School massacre, 15-year-old student Anthony "T.J." Solomon entered his school with a .22-caliber rifle, wounding six students. A 15-year-old girl was hospitalized in critical condition, and the other victims suffered non-life-threatening injuries. Solomon intended to commit suicide with a revolver but was talked into dropping the gun and surrendering by an assistant principal. Solomon allegedly left a note pledging allegiance to the Columbine attackers.
November 1, 1999	Bad Reichenhall, Germany	Martin Peyerl	5	7	Bad Reichenhall shooting: Martin Peyerl was a German student who opened fire from his bedroom window, killing four people and wounding seven others before committing suicide. Upon discussion about the Columbine attack with friends, he reportedly said: "Great, I want to do that myself."
December 6, 1999	Fort Gibson, Oklahoma, United States	Seth Randall Trickey	0	5	Fort Gibson School shooting: Seth Trickey, a straight-A student with friends and no prior mental health issues or a history of violence, outside of the school just prior to the school day starting. He was tackled by a teacher and police officer. A psychiatrist during Trickey's court hearing stated that he was "deeply influenced by Columbine".
April 20, 2000	Ottawa, Ontario, Canada	15-year-old student	0	6	Cairine Wilson Secondary School: On the one year anniversary of the Columbine attacks, a 15-year-old student stabbed another student he had previously had disagreements with - then began randomly stabbing others throughout the school. The principal talked the teenaged boy down and convinced him to give up the knife, but not before attempting to inflict wounds on his own wrists. The boy was afterwards described as a "loner" and had often been bullied and teased about his appearance. The attacker was influenced by Columbine.
March 5, 2001	Santee, California, United States	Charles Andrew Williams	2	13	Santana High School shooting: Charles Andrew "Andy" Williams perpetrated at his high school on March 5, 2001. In the shooting, two students were killed and 13 others were wounded. Williams previously stated that he was going to "pull a Columbine".
March 22, 2001	El Cajon, California, United States	Jason Hoffman	0	6	Granite Hills High School shooting: During the fifth period, minutes after lunch period had ended, 18-year-old former GHHS Student, Jason Hoffman arrived on campus and with a shotgun on the attendance office, which also houses the principal and vice principals' offices, from the outside. Five people were either injured by shrapnel or suffered severe symptoms from the traumatic experience but few victims incurred bullet wounds. Hoffman was shot in the buttocks and jaw. He was arrested by police officer Rich Agundez, who had been on campus during school hours since the shooting two weeks earlier at a high school within the same district, Santana High School. Hoffman died from suicide by hanging in his San Diego Central Jail cell shortly before his sentencing on October 29, 2001. Hoffman had said in the past that he wished he could've committed the Columbine massacre.
April 26, 2002	Erfurt, Germany	Robert Steinhäuser	16	1	Erfurt school massacre: 19-year-old Robert Steinhäuser, who was permanently expelled from school in October 2001, entered his former secondary school and killed 13 staff members, two students and a police officer, and wounded a student before committing suicide. Steinhäuser had researched Columbine on his computer.
September 15–17, 2004	London and Sussex, England	Daniel Gonzalez	4	2	Daniel Gonzalez wounded a man and killed a woman in a stabbing spree before killing two men and a woman and wounding another person in a rampage two days later. He said he wanted to replicate the Columbine shooting.
September 28, 2004	Carmen de Patagones, Provincia de Buenos Aires, Argentina	Rafael Solich	3	5	Carmen de Patagones school shooting: Rafael Solich fatally shot 3 and injured 5 at his school. Solich had watched the movie Elephant which was based on the Columbine massacre and listened to a song which referenced the two perpetrators the previous day.
February 13, 2005	Ulster, New York, United States	Robert C. Bonelli Jr.	0	2	On February 13, 2005, Robert Bonelli, age 24, of Glasco, New York, entered the mall with a semi-automatic AK-47 Variant and began firing it in the mall's Best Buy shop. Panic ensued as employees and shoppers began to flee the mall. Bonelli moved into the mall's main corridor and continued firing his weapon until he ran out of ammunition. After emptying the assault rifle, he promptly dropped it. As Bonelli dropped the weapon, a mall employee grabbed his gun, and another tackled him. The mall was evacuated and Bonelli was taken into custody. No one was killed in the shooting, but two people, a 20-year-old National Guard recruiter and a 56-year-old male shopper, were wounded. After the incident, Ulster County investigators searched Bonelli's room at the home he shared with his father and found what Ulster County District Attorney Donald Williams described as "Columbine memorabilia". Officials described the young man as being fascinated by the Columbine High School massacre.
March 21, 2005	Red Lake, Minnesota, United States	Jeffrey James Weise	9	9	2005 Red Lake shootings: 9 people were killed and 5 were injured on March 21, 2005, in two places on the Red Lake Indian Reservation in Red Lake, Minnesota, United States. That morning, 16-year-old Jeffrey Weise killed his grandfather (a tribal police officer) and his grandfather's girlfriend at their home. After taking his grandfather's police weapons and vest, Weise drove his grandfather's police vehicle to Red Lake Senior High School, where he had been a student some months before. Weise shot and killed seven people at the school and wounded five others. The dead included an unarmed security guard at the entrance of the school, then a teacher and five students. After the police arrived, Weise exchanged gunfire with them. After being wounded, he shot and killed himself, taking his life in a vacant classroom. Weise had researched and discussed the Columbine shooting online and with a classmate, and also mimicked a sentence Eric Harris said during the Columbine shooting as Weise carried out the shooting.
November 26, 2005	Fayette, Maine, United States	Patrick Armstrong	1	0	Armstrong murdered his neighbor, 14-year-old Marlee Johnston. Armstrong reportedly admired the Columbine killers.
March 14, 2006	Reno, Nevada, United States	James Scott Newman	0	2	2006 Pine Middle School shooting: 14-year-old student James Scott Newman shot two students in the hallway of Pine Middle School. Newman had researched the Columbine shooting on the internet.
August 30, 2006	Hillsborough, North Carolina, United States	Alvaro Castillo	1	2	2006 Orange High School shooting: 18-year-old Alvaro Rafael Castillo opened fire at his former high school with a rifle and shotgun, shooting eight times and wounding two students. When his rifle jammed, he was apprehended by a teacher and a former state trooper. Prior to the attack, Castillo killed his father with a firearm before driving to school in a van. In the van police officers found ammunition, pipe bombs, and other weapons. Castillo had worn a shirt referencing Columbine and had sent a video tape and written letter to a newspaper company referencing Columbine.
September 13, 2006	Montreal, Quebec, Canada	Kimveer Gill	1	19	2006 Dawson College shooting: Kimveer Gill at Dawson College, near downtown Montreal. One victim, Anastasia De Sousa, died the next day at the hospital due to serious injuries, while another 19 were injured, eight of whom were listed in critical condition, with six requiring surgery. Gill then died by suicide. He had posted online about the Columbine massacre and had written a note praising the Columbine perpetrators.
September 22, 2006	Pocatello, Idaho, United States	Brian Lee Draper, Torey Michael Adamcik	1	0	Murder of Cassie Jo Stoddart: Two 16-year-old boys murdered a classmate at her home. At the trial, the prosecution revealed that Draper and Adamcik were inspired by Harris and Klebold.
September 29, 2006	Cazenovia, Wisconsin, United States	Eric Hainstock	1	0	2006 Weston High School shooting: Eric Hainstock brought a shotgun and a handgun to school and confronted the principal. The shotgun was wrestled away from him, but in a struggle over the handgun, Hainstock shot the principal, who died later of his wounds. Hainstock was influenced by Columbine.
November 20, 2006	Emsdetten, Germany	Sebastian Bosse	0	37	2006 Emsdetten school shooting: An 18-year-old former student entered the Geschwister school in western Germany with a sawed-off percussion rifle, a sawed-off 22-caliber bolt-action rifle, a caplock pistol and a set of explosive devices. The rampage started when Bosse shot five people with his guns. Police stormed the building, and the shooter released several smoke bombs as he retreated to the third floor, which caused injuries to people inside the school and police officers due to smoke inhalation. The suspect then took his own life. Bosse praised the Columbine shooters in his diary.
April 10, 2007	Gresham, Oregon, United States	Chad Escobedo	0	10	Springwater Trail High School shooting: High school freshman Chad Escobedo shot the windows out of two classrooms from outside, injuring ten students with shrapnel and broken glass, two of which required stitches. His motive was to shoot at a class in which he was enrolled, unhappy that the instructor had called his parents; the classrooms he hit, however, were not his intended target. Escobedo reportedly got the idea to commit the attack after watching a documentary on the Columbine attack.
April 16, 2007	Blacksburg, Virginia, United States	Seung-Hui Cho	32	17	Virginia Tech shooting: Seung-Hui Cho killed 32 people (27 students and five faculty members) on campus in two separate attacks, about two hours apart. Another 17 people were injured in the second attack, 6 of them when they jumped from second-story windows to escape. Cho died by suicide after police breached the main entrance doors. Cho had referred to the Columbine perpetrators as "martyrs" in a written letter to the press. Cho had also written an assignment in high school detailing that he wanted to repeat Columbine.
November 7, 2007	Tuusula, Finland	Pekka-Eric Auvinen	8	13	Jokela school shooting: 18-year-old student Pekka-Eric Auvinen with a .22-caliber semi-automatic SIG Mosquito pistol at Jokela High School, in Tuusula, Finland. Six students, the school principal, and the school nurse were killed. The forty-minute attack ended when Auvinen shot himself in the head, later dying that evening at a Helsinki hospital. Auvinen's online username referenced the Columbine massacre and frequently posted videos about the massacre on YouTube.
August 27, 2007	Boulder, Colorado, United States	Kenton Astin	0	1	Astin stabbed a student at the University of Colorado on the morning of August 27, 2007. Prior to the attack, he had been shouting things like "We are Columbine."
December 9, 2007	Arvada, Colorado, United States	Matthew Murray	4	5	2007 Colorado YWAM and New Life shootings: Matthew Murray attacked a training school in Arvada, Colorado, killing two and wounding two others. He then drove to a church in Colorado Springs, Colorado, where he killed two more people and wounded three before being shot by a security guard. Murray then died by suicide. Murray posted many violent threats on religious websites prior to the shooting, one of them referencing a quote said by Harris.
February 14, 2008	DeKalb, Illinois, United States	Steven Kazmierczak	5	17	Northern Illinois University shooting: Steven Kazmierczak opened fire with a shotgun and three pistols in a crowd of students on campus, killing five students and injuring 17 more people, before fatally shooting himself. Kazmierczak had shown particular interest in the Columbine shooting.
August 17, 2008	Krugersdorp, South Africa	Morné Hamse	1	3	Nic Diederichs Technical High School slashing: Morné Hamse, 18, attacked his school using a samurai sword, killing a student while wounding another student and two staff members before voluntarily ending the attack. Hamse was influenced by the Columbine massacre.
September 23, 2008	Kauhajoki, Finland	Matti Saari	10	≈33	Kauhajoki school shooting: 22-year-old culinary arts student Matti Saari entered his college armed with a pistol and multiple Molotov cocktails. Nine students and a teacher died in the shooting, and he set their bodies and school property on fire. Saari then shot himself in the head, later dying at Tampere University Hospital. Saari had Columbine footage saved on his computer.
March 11, 2009	Winnenden, Baden-Württemberg, Germany	Tim Kretschmer	15	9	2009 Winnenden shootings: 17-year-old graduate student Tim Kretschmer opened fire with a semi-automatic 9mm Beretta pistol in two classrooms at the Albertville-Realschule, in Winnenden, Germany, killing nine students and one teacher; another two teachers were shot to death in a hallway by Kretschmer as he fled the school. Kretschmer then killed a bystander outside a nearby psychiatric hospital, and fled by vehicle to Wendlingen, a neighboring town, where he killed two bystanders at a car dealership and instigated a gun-battle with police. Kretschmer died by suicide during the exchange of gunfire. He had researched the Columbine massacre.
May 18, 2009	Larose, Louisiana, United States	Justin Dorset	1 (the perpetrator)	0	Dorset attempted to kill his teacher, but his shot missed. He then died by suicide. Columbine-related materials were discovered at his home.
February 23, 2010	Littleton, Colorado, United States	Bruco Eastwood	0	2	A 32-year-old gunman, identified as Bruco Strong Eagle Eastwood, armed with a .30–06 Winchester Model 70 bolt-action rifle, opened fire on students at Deer Creek Middle School at 3:30 pm (MST) as school was being let out in Littleton, Colorado. The gunman was later tackled by a math teacher and the teacher turned him into the police when they arrived on scene. The gunman shot and injured two students at the school before he was taken into custody. Eastwood was placed into a mental health facility for life. He was influenced by Columbine.
December 28, 2010	Didcot, England	Unknown	0	1	A 16-year-old boy attempted to kill his sister. He had listed "shooting up schools like Columbine" as his occupation.
April 9, 2011	Alphen aan den Rijn, South Holland, Netherlands	Tristan van der Vlis	6	17	Alphen aan den Rijn shopping mall shooting: Tristan van der Vlis carried out a mass shooting at a mall in the Netherlands, killing 6 and injuring 11 before committing suicide. He researched the Columbine massacre.
March 20, 2012	Waller, Texas, United States	Trey Eric Sesler	3	0	2012 Waller killings: Trey Eric Sesler, 22, arrested for killing his parents and brother in Texas. He had planned on attacking his former school afterwards. Sesler was fascinated by the Columbine school massacre.
July 20, 2012	Aurora, Colorado, United States	James Eagan Holmes	12	58	2012 Aurora, Colorado shooting, on July 20, 2012, a mass shooting occurred inside a movie theater in during a late night screening of the film The Dark Knight Rises. Dressed in tactical clothing, James Holmes set off tear gas grenades and shot into the audience with multiple firearms. 12 people were killed and 70 others were injured, 58 of them from gunfire. Holmes did in-depth research about the Columbine massacre to see what the police response time would be and how much ammo he would need.
August 27, 2012	Baltimore, Maryland, United States	Robert Gladden Jr.	0	1	Perry Hally High School shooting: 15-year-old Robert Gladden fired two shots with a shotgun inside the cafeteria at his high school. A 17-year-old senior student was critically wounded in the lower back. Gladden was subdued by two faculty members and arrested by police. He was influenced by Columbine.
December 14, 2012	Newtown, Connecticut, United States	Adam Lanza	27	2	Sandy Hook Elementary School shooting: Adam Lanza, 20, had "an obsession with mass murders, in particular, the April 1999 shootings at Columbine High School in Colorado." The official investigation came to no conclusion of motive.
October 14, 2013	Massama, Portugal	Gonçalo A.	0	4	Gonçalo A. stabbed three students and a staff member at a school in Massama, Portugal. He told authorities that he wanted to mimic the Columbine shooting.
October 21, 2013	Sparks, Nevada, United States	Jose Reyes	1	2	2013 Sparks Middle School shooting: At approximately 7:15 am, a 12-year-old seventh grade student, Jose Reyes, began shooting with a Ruger 9 mm semi-automatic handgun at Sparks Middle School. A 12-year-old male student was hit in the shoulder and wounded. A teacher, Michael Landsberry, tried to intervene with Reyes and was fatally shot in the chest while standing on a playground. Reyes then shot and wounded another male student in the abdomen who tried to come to Landsberry's assistance as he fell onto the ground. The shooter then died by suicide from a self-inflicted gunshot wound to the head. Reyes had researched a game about the Columbine massacre.
December 13, 2013	Centennial, Colorado, United States	Karl Pierson	1	0	Arapahoe High school shooting: 18-year-old student Karl Pierson entered his high school with a shotgun and fatally wounded a 17-year-old female student, Claire Davis. Pierson then died by suicide by shooting himself. Pierson was influenced by a shooting that was influenced by Columbine and chose the day before it happened to reference the shooting.
January 25, 2014	Columbia, Maryland, United States	Darion Marcus Aguilar	2	5	Columbia mall shooting: Aguilar was obsessed with mass shootings at school and malls. He killed two mall employees before committing suicide. During the attack, he dressed as the Columbine killers.
April 9, 2014	Murrysville, Pennsylvania, United States	Alexander Brando Hribal	0	23	Franklin Regional High School stabbing: Alex Hribal, a sophomore, came to school with two knives. He began roaming the halls and stabbed his classmates and a security guard. Before he was tackled by Sam King, the school's assistant principal, and taken into custody, he had injured 23 people and himself. Hribal chose the day of the attack to honor the birth date of Eric Harris.
April 29, 2014	Kennesaw, Georgia, United States	Geddy Kramer	0	6	Geddy Kramer, 19, shot and wounded six co-workers at a FedEx facility and then died by suicide. He was reportedly obsessed with the Columbine shootings.
June 5, 2014	Seattle, Washington, United States	Aaron Rey Ybarra	1	2	Seattle Pacific University shooting: Aaron Ybarra committed a shooting at Seattle Pacific University. Ybarra was obsessed with the Columbine massacre, and may have visited the school.
June 8, 2014	Las Vegas, Nevada, United States	Jered and Amanda Miller	3	0	2014 Las Vegas shootings: A married couple, Jerad and Amanda Miller, committed a shooting where five people were killed, including the two shooters. The couple first killed two police officers at a restaurant before fleeing into a Walmart, where they killed Joseph Wilcox, an intervening armed civilian. The couple died after engaging responding officers in a shootout in Walmart; police shot and killed Jerad, while Amanda died by suicide after being wounded. Friends of the Millers reported that they idolized the Columbine perpetrators.
April 20, 2015	Barcelona, Catalonia, Spain	13-year-old student	1	4	2015 Barcelona school attack: A 13-year-old student in Barcelona attacked his school, IES Joan Fuster, with a crossbow and machete, killing Abel Martínez Oliva and injuring four others. It is known that the attacker chose April 20th, the day of the Columbine High School massacre.
July 22, 2015	Broken Arrow, Oklahoma, United States	Robert and Michael Bever	5	1	Broken Arrow murders: Michael and Robert Bever murdered 5 members of their family. They expressed a desire to outdo the Columbine shooting in a separate attack after they killed their family.
August 26, 2015	Moneta, Virginia, United States	Vester Lee Flanagan II	2	1	Murders of Alison Parker and Adam Ward: Vester Flanagan shot Alison Parker and Adam Ward on live television, killing them. He later died by suicide. Flanagan expressed an admiration for the Columbine shooters.
October 1, 2015	Roseburg, Oregon, United States	Christopher Harper-Mercer	9	8	2015 Umpqua Community College shooting: Christopher Harper-Mercer, 26, shot and killed nine people in a creative writing class and injured eight other people. After a brief exchange of gunfire with police, during which he was injured, Mercer shot and killed himself. Mercer took inspiration from two shootings that were influenced by Columbine.
October 22, 2015	Trollhättan, Sweden	Anton Lundin Pettersson	3	2	Trollhättan school attack: On 22 October 2015, a mass stabbing occurred at Kronan Primary School in Trollhättan, Sweden. 21-year-old Anton Lundin Pettersson killed three people and wounded another two with a sword, later dying from gunshot wounds sustained after charging police. Pettersson allegedly took inspiration from the Columbine High School massacre, notably in wearing a trench coat.
September 28, 2016	Townville, South Carolina, United States	Jesse Osborne	2	3	2016 Townville Elementary School shooting: Osborne killed his father and then killed a child at his former elementary school playground before his firearm jammed. Osborne made online posts about Columbine.
March 16, 2017	Grasse, France	Killian Barbey	0	4	Grasse school shooting: 16-year-old Killian Barbey, a student at the Alexis de Tocqueville high school, shot and injured 4 people at around 1 p.m. on March 16. Authorities have said that he was heavily armed with a rifle, two handguns and two grenades. Barbey allegedly watched videos of the Columbine perpetrators while preparing for his own attack.
June 8, 2017	Eaton Township, Pennsylvania, United States	Randy Stair	3	0	Eaton Township Weis Markets shooting: 24-year-old Randy Stair shot and killed three of his co-workers at a supermarket before he died by suicide. Stair had praised the Columbine attackers and wanted to meet them in the afterlife.
September 5, 2017	Ivanteyevka, Moscow Oblast, Russia	Mikhail Pivnev	0	4	2017 Ivanteyevka school shooting: Ninth-grader Mikhail Pivnev opened fire in his school, injuring 3 students and a teacher. Pivnev had a registered VK account which referenced Harris in its username and frequently posted about the Columbine massacre.
September 13, 2017	Rockford, Washington, United States	Caleb Joseph Sharpe	1	3	Freeman high school shooting: Sharpe killed a fellow student who bullied him, then fired three random shots down hallway that wounded three other students. He had watched documentaries on the Columbine shooting.
October 20, 2017	Goiânia, Estado de Goiás, Brazil	Unnamed 14-year-old male student	2	4	Goyases School shooting: An unidentified student opened fire in his classroom. The student told police he was inspired by Columbine.
December 7, 2017	Aztec, New Mexico, United States	William Atchison	2	0	Aztec High School shooting: On December 7, 2017, 21-year-old Bill Atchison, a former student at the school, killed two students, went inside the classroom where students had barricaded themselves in a small office area and shot several magazines, and then died by suicide. Atchison was once suspended from his school when he wrote a memorial dedicated to Columbine on a classroom's whiteboard.
January 15, 2018	Perm, Russia	Lev Bizhakov and Alexander Buslidze	0	15	2018 Perm school stabbing: The perpetrators entered a classroom where a lesson for 10-12 year olds was being taught and proceeded to stab the teacher and children before stabbing each other in a suicide attempt. One of the perpetrators, Bidzhakov, posted videos of the Columbine massacre on VK.
January 17, 2018	Chelyabinsk, Russia	Unidentified ninth-grade male	0	1	A ninth-grader stabbed another student at school. The attacker was allegedly a part of an online community that glorified Columbine.
February 14, 2018	Parkland, Florida, United States	Nikolas Cruz	17	17/18	Parkland high school shooting: On February 14, 2018, a gunman, identified as Nikolas Cruz, opened fire, killing seventeen students and staff members and injuring seventeen or eighteen others. Days before the shooting, Cruz had viewed several videos glorifying Columbine.
April 18, 2018	Sterlitamak, Russia	Artyom Tagirov	0	4	Tagirov injured three in a stabbing attack in Sterlitamak, Russia before attempting suicide. He praised the Columbine attack on social media.
April 20, 2018	Ocala, Florida, United States	Sky Bouche	0	1	2018 Ocala school shooting: Sky Bouche, 19, blended in with students and entered the school with a shotgun concealed in a guitar case. He then shot through a classroom door, injuring a 17-year-old boy in the ankle before voluntarily ending the attack. The school resource officer arrived on the scene within minutes; Bouche was taken into custody without incident. He had been obsessed with Columbine and had made posts online supporting the massacre.
May 18, 2018	Santa Fe, Texas, United States	Dimitrios Pagourtzis	10	14	2018 Santa Fe High School shooting: Ten people – eight students and two teachers – were fatally shot, and thirteen others were wounded. Dimitrios Pagourtzis, a 17-year-old student at the school, was taken into custody. Pagourtzis had worn clothing items similar to the Columbine attackers during the shooting.
May 25, 2018	Noblesville, Indiana, United States	David Moore	0	2	2018 Noblesville West Middle School shooting: A 13-year-old student shot and injured teacher Jason Seaman and student Ella Whistler. Moore had been influenced by Columbine.
July 22, 2018	Toronto, Ontario, Canada	Faisal Hussain	2	13	2018 Toronto shooting: Hussain killed two and wounded 13 in a mass shooting on Danforth Avenue in Toronto. In high school, Hussain openly praised the Columbine school shooting.
September 28, 2018	Medianeira, Brazil	Unnamed 15-year-olds	0	2	Medianeira attack: Two 15-year-old students armed with a garrucha shot and injured 2 at the João Manoel Mondrone state school in Medianeira, Brazil before being arrested. CCTV footage showed one of the perpetrators wearing a shirt that mimicked the shirt Harris wore during the Columbine massacre.
October 17, 2018	Kerch, Crimea (disputed territory)	Vladislav Roslyakov	20	70	Kerch Polytechnic College massacre: A school shooting and bomb attack occurred at a college in Kerch, Crimea, on October 17, 2018. The perpetrator wore clothing that mimicked Harris. He also committed suicide in the library just like Harris and Klebold did.
March 13, 2019	Suzano, São Paulo, Brazil	Guilherme Taucci Monteiro, Luiz Henrique de Castro	8	11	Suzano school shooting: The perpetrators, Guilherme Taucci Monteiro and Luiz Henrique de Castro, both former students at the school, killed five students and two school employees. Before the attack, in a car shop near the school, the pair also killed Monteiro's uncle. The pair carried out the attack while wearing clothes resembling those worn by the lead characters of Elephant, a film based on the Columbine shooting.
May 7, 2019	Douglas County, Colorado, United States	Alec McKinney & Devon Erickson	1	6	2019 STEM School Highlands Ranch shooting: Alec McKinney and Devon Erickson went to their school with firearms and killed 1 student while injuring 6 others; 2 others were injured by police gunfire. Erickson and McKinney began researching the Columbine shooting after the death of Sol Pais, a teenage girl obsessed with Columbine.
May 27, 2019	Brześć Kujawski, Kujawsko-Pomorskie, Poland	Marek Nowak	0	2	An 18-year-old former student, Marek Nowak, detonated explosives and shot an 11-year-old girl and a 59-year-old female janitor, at Władysław Łokie Elementary School. The perpetrator had multiple Columbine-related pictures and internet memes on his Facebook account.
May 27, 2019	Puerto Montt, Chile	M.A.C.	0	1	An unnamed 15-year-old opened fire at the Patagonia College school, injuring one student before fleeing. He had mentioned the Columbine High School massacre in his notebooks and said he felt "inspired" by it.
May 28, 2019	Volsk, Saratov Region, Russia	Daniil Pulkin	0	1	2019 Volsk school attack: Pulkin threw two Molotov cocktails and hit a girl over the head with an axe at his school. He expressed interest in the Columbine shooting and was primarily inspired by attacks that also took inspiration from Columbine.
January 10, 2020	Torreon, Coahuila, Mexico	José Ángel Ramos Betts	1	6	Colegio Cervantes shooting: 11-year-old José Ángel Ramos Betts inside a private school in Torreon, Mexico. He killed 1 teacher and wounded 6 others before he died by suicide. Ramos wore clothing mimicking what Harris wore during the Columbine massacre.
January 25, 2020	Chełm, Poland	Łukasz Wach	1	1	14-year-old Łukasz Wach attacked his family with a knife at home, killing his stepmother and wounding her son, after which he went to a local culture house, where he claimed to have given up a plan to carry out an attack. He had nicknamed himself "Reb", the online nickname of Harris, in one of his social media accounts.
October 12, 2020	Nizhny Novgorod Oblast, Russia	Daniil Monakhov	4	2	2020 Bolsheorlovskoe shooting: Daniil Monakhov killed 4 people and wounded 2 more before shooting himself. He was obsessed with Columbine and he was known for threatening to do a school shooting. He made several references to Columbine on social networks.
August 20, 2021	Michigan, United States	Aidan Ingalls	1	1	19-year-old Aidan Ingalls opened fire on a pier in South Haven, Michigan, killing a man and seriously injuring his wife before committing suicide. Ingalls wrote about the Columbine massacre in his diary and wore identical clothing to what Eric Harris wore during the Columbine massacre on the day of the shooting.
August 28, 2022	Bend, Oregon, United States	Ethan Blair Miller	2	2	2022 Bend, Oregon shooting: 20 year-old Ethan Miller opened fire at a Safeway grocery store armed with an AR-15 type rifle and a shotgun, killing 2 and injuring 2 others before he died by suicide. Miller had an interest in Columbine and wore a shirt during the massacre that mimicked what Klebold wore during the Columbine shooting.
September 26, 2022	Izhevsk, Udmurtia, Russia	Artyom Kazantsev	18	23	Izhevsk school shooting: 34-year-old Artyom Kazantsev, who was armed with two pistols, killed 18 and injured 23 others. He honoured Harris and Klebold by having their names braided on key chains which attached to his weapons.
November 25, 2022	Aracruz, Espírito Santo, Brazil	Gabriel Rodrigues Castiglioni	4	12	Aracruz school shootings: 16-year-old Gabriel Rodrigues dressed in a military camouflage uniform, wearing an armband with a swastika, skull mask and bucket hat, broke into a public school and then a private school in the city of Aracruz, Espírito Santo, killing four and injuring 12. The perpetrator had made online posts about Columbine.
December 14, 2022	Ipaussu, São Paulo, Brazil	Thiago Oliveira Silva	0	2	22-year-old Thiago Oliveira Silva walked into a school and stabbed two teachers, as well as taking a hostage by holding a knife up to his throat. He was armed with a knife, a pocketknife and an imitation firearm. The perpetrator reportedly admired the perpetrators of the Columbine Massacre.
March 27, 2023	Nashville, Tennessee, U.S.	Aiden Hale	6	2	2023 Nashville school shooting: 28-year-old Aiden Hale opened fire inside The Covenant School, killing three 9-year-olds and three adults before being killed by police. In his journals released by authorities, he expressed that he wanted his "massacre to end in a way that Eric & Dylan would be proud of".
June 19, 2023	Cambé, Paraná, Brazil	Marcos Vinícius da Silva Damas	2	0	Cambé school shooting: 21-year-old Marcos Vinícius opened fire inside the Helena Kolody School, killing one student and injuring the other, whom died the following day, before being arrested. The investigation showed he was inspired the Columbine Massacre and initially planned the attack in April 20 but gave up. The attack happened two months later.
October 3, 2023	Bangkok, Thailand	Phasid Trutassanawin	3	4	Siam Paragon shooting: 14-year-old Phasid Trutassanawin shot and killed three people at the Siam Paragon mall in Bangkok, Thailand. Several visual and behavioral elements of his attack led observers and researchers to draw strong parallels to Columbine.
January 4, 2024	Perry, Iowa, United States	Dylan Butler	2	6	Perry High School shooting: Dylan Butler killed a 6th grade student and mortally wounded the principal, who died 10 days later, and injuring 6 others, during a morning breakfast on the first day after winter break. The shooter also planted an improvised explosive device inside the school, which was defused. The attacker posted a video on TikTok with music referencing the Columbine massacre.
April 2, 2024	Vantaa, Finland	12-year-old male student	1	2	Viertola school shooting: A 12-year-old student armed with a .22LR single-action revolver fired four times inside a classroom, killing 1 and injuring 2. A police report revealed he had searched for Columbine-related videos on YouTube and a gore site.
April 13, 2024	Bondi Junction, Sydney, New South Wales, Australia	Joel Cauchi	6	12	Bondi Junction stabbings: 40 year-old Joel Cauchi stabbed six people to death and injured 12 others at the Westfield Bondi Junction shopping center before being shot and killed by a responding officer. Cauchi made searches relating to Columbine on Reddit immediately prior to the stabbings.
May 1, 2024	Mount Horeb, Wisconsin, United States	Damian Haglund	1 (perpetrator)	0	14-year old Damian Haglund left his home in Mount Horeb, Wisconsin armed with a firework, 3 Molotov cocktails, and a .177 Ruger pellet gun. He stole his parents' car and drove it to the Mount Horeb Intermediate center, opened fire, and was killed by responding officers before anyone was harmed. He had left a note insinuating he wanted to commit suicide by cop. The shooter had written online about Columbine and wore a T-shirt with the message "Natural Selection" across it, the same shirt worn by Harris.
August 12, 2024	Eskisehir, Turkey	Arda Küçükyetim	0	5	2024 Eskisehir mosque stabbing: 18-year-old Arda Küçükyetim committed a stabbing spree outside of Tepebaşı mosque in Eskisehir, Turkey, injuring 5. In one page of his manifesto, he included an image of the two Columbine perpetrators in the school cafeteria. The perpetrator committed suicide in prison in September 2025.
September 13, 2024	Luton, England	Nicholas Prosper	3	0	Prosper family murders: 18-year-old Nicholas Prosper murdered his mother, brother, and sister with a double-barrel shotgun at their home and had plotted to carry out a shooting at a nearby elementary school. He was reportedly "obsessed" with mass shootings such as the one at Columbine, drew images of the perpetrators on Instagram, and had viewed images of the massacre before shooting his family.
September 16, 2024	Chelyabinsk, Russia	Roman G.	0	4	Armed with two hammers, a knife and an air pistol, 13-year-old Roman G. attacked a biology classroom where a lesson was being taught, injuring 3 students and a teacher before being detained. During the rampage, Roman had worn the same KMFDM shirt that Eric Harris owned.
December 16, 2024	Madison, Wisconsin, United States	Natalie Lynn "Samantha" Rupnow	2	6	Abundant Life Christian School shooting: 15-year-old student Natalie Rupnow killed a fellow student and a teacher at Abundant Life Christian School. Rupnow also had been seen wearing a KMFDM t-shirt that was identical to Harris's.
April 26, 2025	Leeds, England	Owen "Oz" Lawrence	0	2	Otley Run pub crawl attack: A 38-year-old man armed with a crossbow and several airguns injured 2 women before fatally wounding himself. On Facebook, he had posted a picture of himself wearing a "Natural Selection" shirt and expressed admiration for the Columbine shooters.
April 30, 2025	Seymour, Indiana, United States	Undisclosed	0	1	An 18-year-old man was arrested after opening fire with a shotgun in the Jackson County Public Library, injuring one employee. After a spent shotgun shell got stuck, the suspect attempted to set the library on fire, at which point a bystander tackled and apprehended him. The suspect told police he was inspired by Columbine and had initially planned to open fire at his high school, but switched his target to the library after seeing a teacher he knew.
June 10, 2025	Graz, Austria	Arthur A.	10	30	Graz school shooting: On June 10, 2025, 21-year-old Arthur A. in Graz, Austria shot and killed 10, and injured 11 before dying by suicide. Various online profiles of his showed an obsession with the Columbine Shooting. He also used similar weaponry to Dylan Klebold: both used double-barrel shotguns and 9mm pistols.
September 10, 2025	Evergreen, Colorado, United States	Desmond Holly	0	3	Evergreen High School: A 16-year-old student opened fire at in Evergreen, Colorado, wounding two students (one more was injured while fleeing) before dying by suicide. The shooter's social media revealed an obsession with mass shootings, especially the Columbine shootings, and Nazism. He also had a shirt modelled after the one worn by Dylan Klebold.
October 14, 2025	Petaling Jaya, Malaysia	"LCH"	1	0	Bandar Utama school stabbing: A 14-year-old boy , armed with at least two sharp weapons (a knife and a karambit), dragged and stabbed a 16-year-old girl repeatedly in the neck and chest, before he was eventually calmed down and restrained by teachers and his older brother. During class hours, he had cornered the victim in a female toilet. Police arrived at the scene and formally arrested the suspect, seizing the weapons and a "final note" found in his possession, which referenced the Columbine shooters, the movie Zero Day (which was largely inspired by the Columbine massacre), and other mass killers.
November 7, 2025	Jakarta, Indonesia	Muhammed Nazriel Fadhel Hidayat	0	96	Jakarta school bombing: On November 7, 2025, a 17-year-old male student detonated two improvised explosives at SMAN 72 school in Jakarta, Indonesia. He injured 95 people and was wounded himself by currently unknown means. The boy had worn a "Natural Selection" shirt identical to Eric Harris.
December 16, 2025	Gorki-2, Odintsovo District, Moscow Oblast, Russia	Timofey Kulyamov	1	3	2025 Odintsovo School attack: A 15-year-old male student attacked fellow students and school staff with a knife and pepper spray, killing a 10-year-old pupil of Tajik descent. He posted many selfies prior to the attack and revealed an obsession with previous mass attacks, including the Graz school shooting, Christchurch attack, Buffalo shooting and the Columbine massacre. He also quoted Eric Harris in his manifesto.
February 3, 2026	Sungai Raya, Kubu Raya, Indonesia	Unnamed 15 year old male	0	1	Sungai Raya school bombing: 15-year-old male student threw a Molotov cocktail at SMPN 3 Sungai Raya in Kubu Raya, West Kalimantan, on February 3, 2026, at 10:40 AM, injuring one person. Written on the suspects bag are the names of infamous school shooters such as Adam Lanza, Seung-Hui Cho, and Salvador Ramos, 2 of which have drawn their inspiration to perperators of Columbine High School massacre. He also left the inscription "Zero Day," a reference to a film about the same incident.
March 26, 2026	Lázaro Cárdenas, Michoacán, México	Osmer "N"	2	0	2026 Lázaro Cárdenas school shooting: Two teachers were killed in a school shooting at the Antón Makárenko Educational Institute in Lázaro Cárdenas, Michoacán, Mexico. The suspect was identified as a 15-year-old male named Osmer "N", in his profile he used the name "vodka.om", an alleged reference to "VoDKa", the username used by Dylan Klebold, one of the two perpetrators of the Columbine High School massacre.
March 30, 2026	San Cristóbal, Santa Fe, Argentina	Unnamed 15-year-old boy	1	8	San Cristóbal school shooting: A 15-year-old boy opened fire at the Mariano Moreno High School in San Cristóbal, Santa Fe, killing a 13-year-old boy and injuring eight others before being tackled. He was arrested. According to police, he was obsessed with school shooters and shared videos on social media, including and especially of Harris and Klebold.
April 7, 2026	Pauls Valley, Oklahoma, United States	Victor Lee Hawkins	0	1	2026 Pauls Valley High School shooting: On April 7, 2026, a shooting occurred at Pauls Valley High School in Oklahoma. 20-year-old Victor Lee Hawkins attempted to shoot a person in the lobby before being tackled by the principal, who was shot once. Hawkins had extensively researched the Columbine massacre and planned to kill students and staff, then himself.
April 14, 2026	Siverek, Şanlıurfa, Turkey	Ömer Ket	0	16	2026 Siverek school shooting: 19-year-old Ömer Ket wounded sixteen people at his former school before killing himself. He posted on Facebook about the Columbine shooters.
April 20, 2026	Teotihuacan, Mexico State, Mexico	Julio César Jasso Ramírez	1	13	2026 Teotihuacan pyramid shooting: On April 20, 2026, a shooting occurred at the Pyramid of the moon at the Teotihuacan archaeological complex. 27-year-old Julio César Jasso Ramírez killed a Canadian tourist and wounded 13 others before committing suicide. An investigation revealed that Ramírez not only revered the Columbine Shooters, but also admired Adolf Hitler. The shooting occurred on the 27th anniversary of the Columbine Massacre, and the 137th birthday of Hitler.
May 18, 2026	San Diego, California, US	Cain Clark, Caleb Vasquez	3	0	2026 Islamic Center of San Diego shooting: On May 18, 2026, two teenagers, aged 17 and 18, Opened fire at the Islamic center of San Diego, killing 3 people before driving to a second location and committing suicide. A 75-page manifesto authored by the two revealed they were influenced by far right extremism, past extremist shooters, and also partially by the Columbine Massacre.
June 22, 2026	Tacloban City, Philippines	"Nash" and "Rod"	3	20	2026 Tacloban school shooting: At 9:20 am, during school time, two Grade 9 students, aged 14 and 15, opened fire at a random classroom at the San Jose National High School, killing 3 people and injuring 20 others armed with two handguns. Around 40 bullet casings were recovered from the sites. Both suspects were apprehended, with one of them wearing the exact "KMFDM" shirt as the Columbine Massacre. Initial interrogation revealed the shooters' motives were allegedly due to being bullied in class.
June 22, 2026	Chico, California, US	Bradley Scott Sayer	2	1	2026 Chico library shooting: On June 22, 2026, a shooting took place at a library in Chico, California, US. 18-year-old Bradley Scott Sayer fatally shot two people. One child was injured. During the attack, Sayer wore a white T-shirt with the phrase "Natural Selection", black suspenders, and black pants; a direct imitation of the outfit worn by Harris.
September 22, 2026	Turgutlu, Manisa Province, Turkey	H.O.	0	11	2026 Turgutlu school shooting: On 22 September 2026, a school shooting occurred near the Inci Uzmez Vocational and Technical Anatolian High School (Turkish: İnci Üzmez Mesleki ve Teknik Anadolu Lisesi) in Turgutlu, Manisa Province, Turkey. Eleven students were injured. He was inspired by Eric Harris, one of the Columbine High School shooters.
October 13, 2026	Umhlali, KwaZulu-Natal, South AFrica	Aaron Thomas Fourie	0	1	2026 Umhlali school attack: On the morning of 13 October 2026, at approximately 8.15 a.m., a stabbing attack occurred at a church-based educational facility in Umhlali, KwaZulu-Natal when a student stabbed a six-year-old child multiple times. During the attack, the suspect wore a t-shirt bearing the words "Wrath", a reference to the Columbine High School massacre.

== See also ==
- Copycat crime
- List of school shootings in the United States (2020s)
