= 2018 Noblesville West Middle School shooting =

School shooting in Noblesville, Indiana

Coordinates: 40.0773°N 86.0316°W

- Location in Indiana Location in United States
- Location: Noblesville West Middle School; Noblesville, Indiana, US
- Date: May 25, 2018; 9:06 a.m. (EDT)
- Attack type: School shooting
- Weapons: .22 TCM handgun; .45 ACP handgun; Knife
- Deaths: 0
- Injuries: 2
- Perpetrators: 13-year-old male

The Noblesville West Middle School shooting occurred on May 25, 2018, in Noblesville, Indiana, United States, when a 13-year-old student shot and injured teacher Jason Seaman and student Ella Whistler. In response, Seaman wrestled the shooter to the ground. The school later reopened. The shooter confessed to the shooting and he served time in a juvenile detention center until October 2023.

== Shooting ==
The shooter asked to be excused during a science test. He returned to the classroom with two handguns and fired at two people: a thirteen-year-old student; Ella Whistler and the assailant's science teacher. The student was shot seven times, and the science teacher, Jason Seaman, threw a basketball at the assailant before wrestling him to the ground, sustaining three bullet wounds to the abdomen, hip, and forearm in the process. Students recounted that Seaman was yelling at the students to evacuate from the room. Seaman later stated that his actions were "...the only acceptable actions I could have done given the circumstances."

Students were evacuated to the Noblesville High School gym. The Noblesville Police Chief stated that there was a secondary threat made at Noblesville High School, that was only a communicated threat but still prompted police to secure the area.

Police stated that the suspect was arrested shortly after the incident and that at the time of arrest he didn't appear to be injured. A school resource officer on the campus responded to the incident.

== Perpetrator ==
The Hamilton County prosecutors publicly released the name of the perpetrator and identified him as a male 13-year-old Noblesville West Middle School student. However, most news outlets withheld reporting the name of the suspect because of his juvenile status and because he would not be charged as an adult.

A Noblesville Police Department spokesperson reported that the perpetrator had not been placed in the system prior to the incident at the school. Prosecutors have reported that at the time of his arrest the perpetrator possessed a .22 caliber gun, a .45 caliber gun and a knife.

Classmates and friends of the perpetrator claim that he was normally friendly and funny, and openly interacted with other students.

=== Family statement ===
The family of the perpetrator released a statement through their family attorney, Eskew Law Firm. In it the family expresses their shock from the actions of the perpetrator, and extend their thoughts, prayers and condolences to those involved specifically the two wounded victims. They acknowledge the lingering questions surrounding the act, and that they are awaiting the results of the investigation and the judicial process.

== Investigation ==
The Noblesville Police Department stated that the investigation was ongoing after the perpetrator was apprehended, and that numerous search warrants had been issued. Security video from the school was also reviewed as part of the investigation.

== Legal proceedings ==
The perpetrator was in court for arraignment under a closed hearing, with no public allowed in the juvenile detention hearing in the Hamilton County Circuit Court.

The Prosecutor of the case sent a statement to the media in regards to the perpetrator and the shooting. In it, the Prosecutor states that only when a petition has been filed alleging the teen is a delinquent as a result of an alleged act that would be a felony under an adult, then very limited information may be released about the individual. A later announcement stated that the perpetrator could not be charged as an adult, as under current state law, a child 13 years of age can only be tried in adult court if the attempt to murder an individual results in death.

After the announcement of the Hamilton County Prosecutors Office that the perpetrator would be tried as a juvenile, there was a call to review Indiana's criminal code. The Indiana House Speaker stated he would review the current laws in relation to charging juveniles as adults, as "Given the heinous acts...I think it's important for us to take a thoughtful look at our criminal code and whether changes to the law are appropriate." Indiana Governor Eric Holcomb has backed statements made by the House Speaker.

On November 14, 2018, the shooter (who had confessed to the shooting) was sentenced to juvenile prison until he turns 18. Judge Felix determined that the Indiana Department of Correction may decide to put the shooter on probation until he turns 18. On October 4, 2023, the shooter was released from custody and into the care of his parents. The judge who granted his release also put him on probation with several restrictions until he turned 21.

== Reactions ==
Representatives Susan Brooks, Andre Carson, Todd Rokita, Luke Messer, Senators Joe Donnelly and Todd Young, Indianapolis mayor Joe Hogsett, March For Our Lives, US President Donald Trump and Vice President Mike Pence all expressed reactions to the shooting.

The Indianapolis Colts invited Ella Whistler and her family to Colts training camp and gave them a standing ovation on July 30, 2018.

The Superintendent of the District called the shooting a "horrible and senseless tragedy" and that the community had shown "tremendous kindness, resilience and strength".

The IHSAA baseball sectional championship was still hosted by the Noblesville Schools with the game being played in honor of the two victims and donations and T-shirt sales would be used to help the victims families with costs.

A GoFundMe was created for Seaman by a Noblesville High School senior. The fundraiser raised over $75,000 in two days.

== See also ==
- List of school shootings in the United States
