= Noblesville High School =

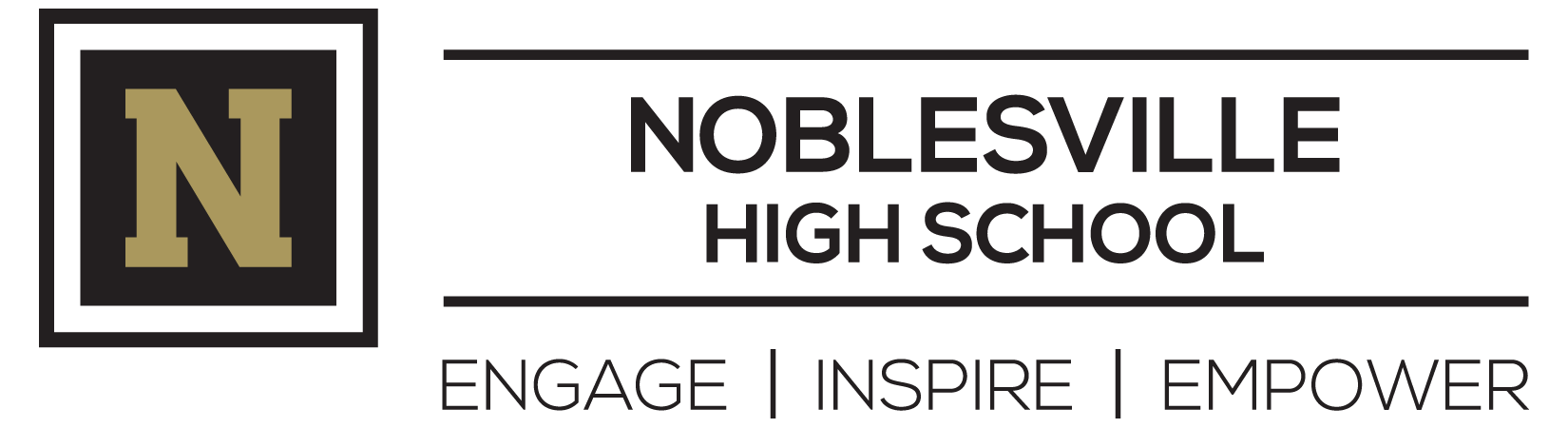
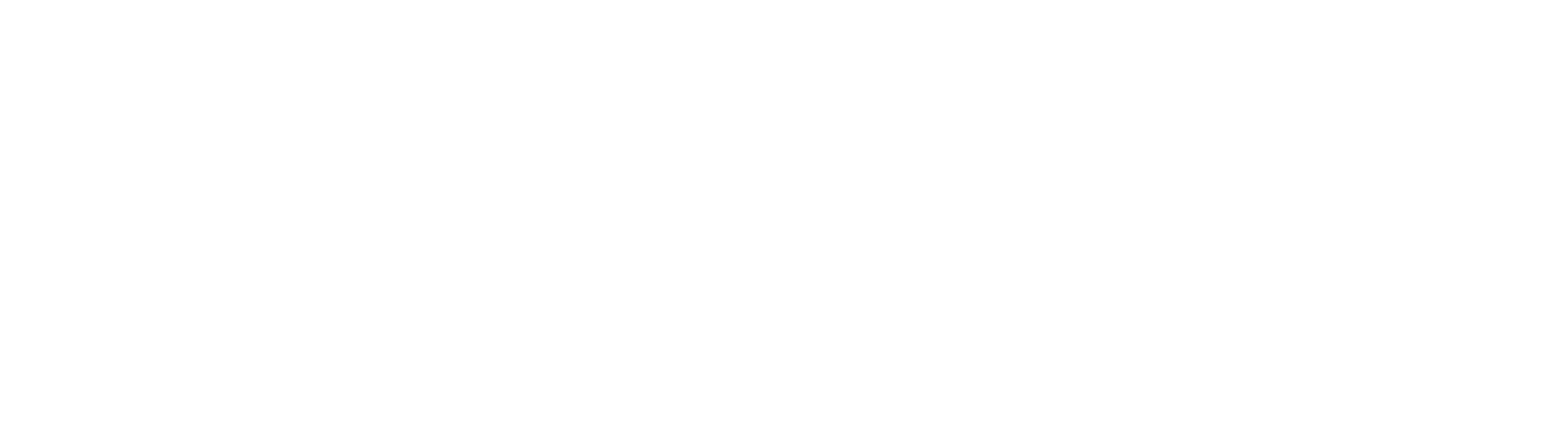

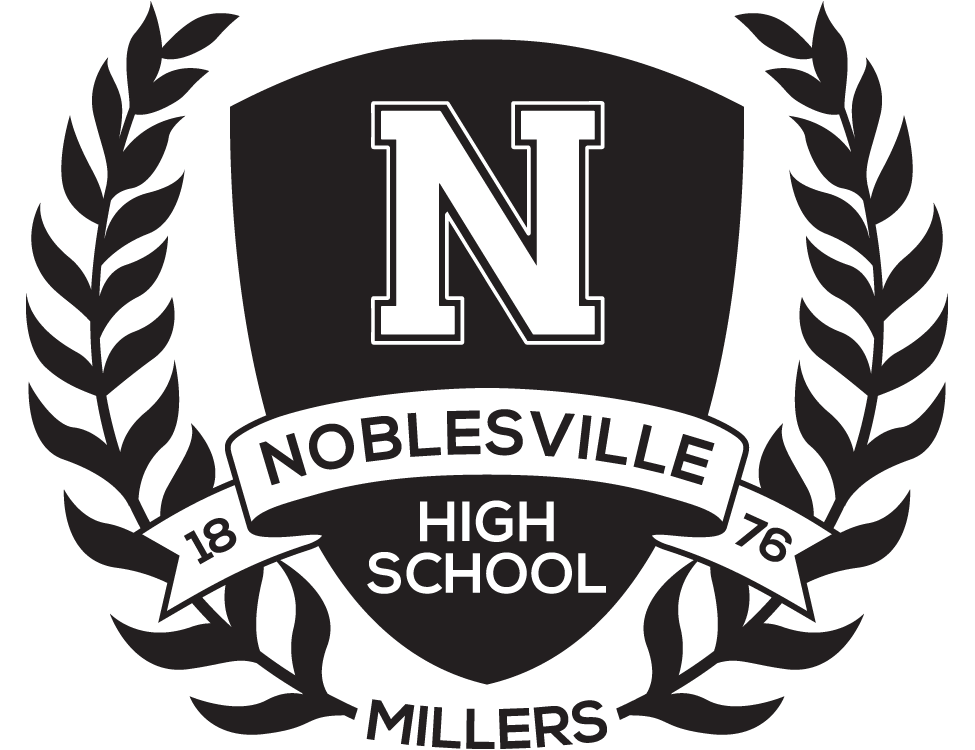
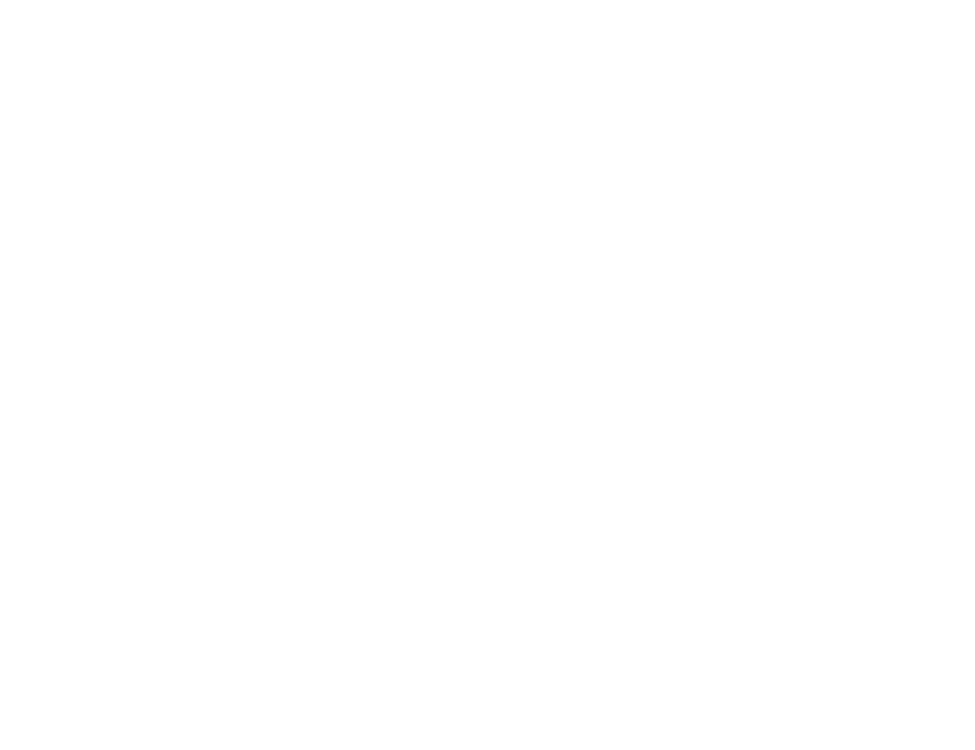
- Academic Seal

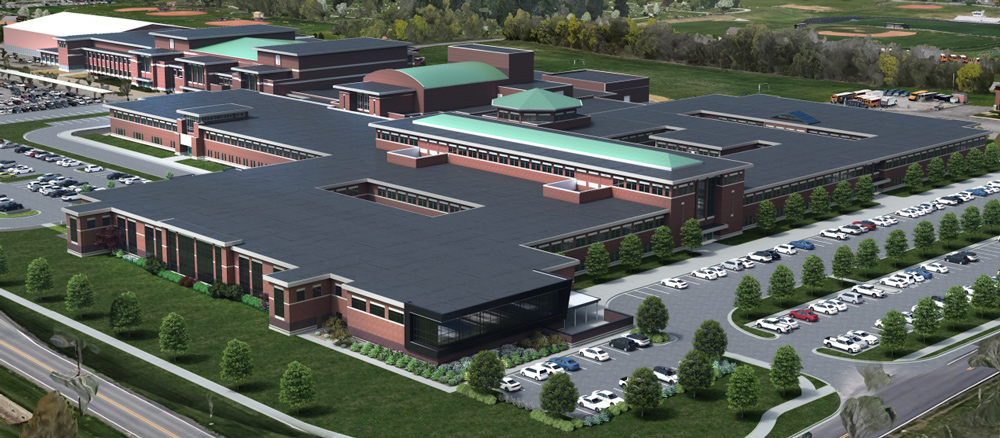
- Aerial view of Noblesville High School.

Location
- 18111 Cumberland Road; Noblesville, Hamilton County, Indiana 46060; United States; 40°3′22″N 85°59′49″W

Information
- Type: Public high school
- Motto: Engage, Inspire, Empower
- Established: 1876; 150 years ago
- Status: Open
- School district: Noblesville Schools
- Superintendent: Daniel Hile
- NCES School ID: 180765001309
- Principal: Janae Mobley
- Teaching staff: 198.00 (on FTE basis)
- Grades: 9–12
- Enrollment: 3,291 (2024–2025)
- Student to teacher ratio: 16.62
- Schedule type: Block schedule
- Campus type: Suburban
- Colors: Black; Gold
- Athletics conference: Hoosier Crossroads Conference
- Mascot: Miller Man
- Team name: Millers
- Publication: Miller Media Now
- Newspaper: Mill Stream
- Yearbook: Shadow
- Website: Noblesville Schools

Noblesville High School (shortened as NHS or Noblesville) is a public high school in Noblesville, Indiana. The school is part of Noblesville Schools and the district encompasses multiple elementary and middle schools, with Noblesville High Schools as its sole high school. The campus serves much of Noblesville and has expanded several times to accommodate the city's rapid suburban growth northeast of Indianapolis..

The Miller Success Academy is the school's alternative education program, located at the Noblesville Schools Community Center. It was created to provide individualized instruction and support for students who need a non-traditional path to graduation, providing alternate methods to receive a high school diploma.

== History ==
=== Campuses ===
Noblesville High School's earliest classes were held in the city's original Conner Street facility, reflecting the small size of the community and shared use of school buildings in the late 19th and early 20th centuries. The district later relocated high school operations to the North 17th Street campus, which would eventually become Noblesville East Middle School, consolidating secondary programs on that site as Noblesville's population grew.

By the mid-1990s, continued enrollment growth prompted construction of a new, modern high school campus on Cumberland Road; which was completed in 1996 and is where Noblesville High School is currently located. The move centralized district high school programming on a larger site with room for future expansion and specialized facilities, aligning with the area's rapid suburban development.

=== Facility repurposing ===
From the opening of the Cumberland Road campus until 2014, Noblesville housed 9th-grade freshman students at Noblesville East Middle School (the campus on Field Drive next to the high school). To unify the high school and address capacity pressures, the district added a Freshman Center in 2014, bringing all four grades together on one site and allowing Noblesville East Middle School to relocate to the previous Freshman campus. The Freshman Center has since been repurposed for some math, art, science, and world language classes and is no longer exclusively for Freshmen.

In 2014, Ivy Tech Community College opened its Hamilton County campus at the former Noblesville East Middle School building on North 17th Street, following district transitions that freed the facility for higher education use. The site underwent significant renovation, and the City of Noblesville realigned 17th Street at Conner Street to improve access to the new campus.

=== Current growth ===
Recent growth has increased demand for improvements at the high school, including an expansion completed in 2025 to support STEM and performing arts programming and general capacity needs. These investments reflect the district's long-term strategy to expand the existing high school rather than construct a second campus, keeping the student body unified while accommodating enrollment increases.

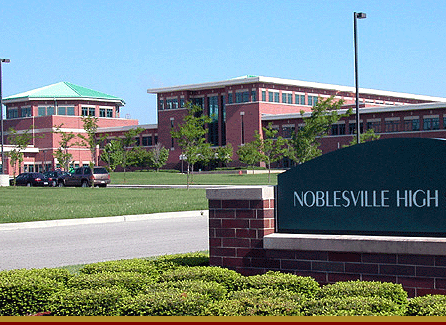
Noblesville High School prior to the Freshman Center addition.

== Academics ==
=== Scheduling ===
Noblesville High School operates on a rotating block schedule:

- Black Days: Blocks 1, 3, 5, and 7.
- Gold Days: Blocks 2, 4, 6, and 8.

All students are assigned a study hall during Block 8, though juniors and seniors with strong academic standing and parental approval may leave campus during that time. Some students may also be assigned an additional study hall on Black Days.

=== Courses ===
Noblesville High School offers a comprehensive curriculum featuring regular and dual-credit courses, including more than 20 Advanced Placement (AP) classes. Each subject has its own department which is overseen by a chairperson.

=== Recognition ===
Noblesville has been recognized nationally as a top 1% STEM school.

The school's music program has been recognized as part of a Best Communities for Music Education designation, offering more than 25 courses in choir, orchestra, jazz band, marching band, and music history. Noblesville also operates one of Indiana's largest student internship programs.

== Demographics ==
As of the 2024–2025 school year, Noblesville High School has an enrollment of 3,291 students in grades 9 through 12. The student body is divided almost evenly by gender and enrollment by grade level is relatively balanced, with each class ranging between 780 and 860 students.

The school's population is predominately White, with smaller percentages of Hispanic, Black, Asian, and multiracial students, reflecting the broader demographics of Noblesville and Hamilton County.

Enrollment by Grade
Grade	Students
Freshman	859 (26.10%)
Sophomore	799 (24.28%)
Junior	787 (23.91%)
Senior	819 (24.89%)
Ungraded	27 (0.82%)

Enrollment by Gender
Gender	Students
Male	1,693 (51.44%)
Female	1,598 (48.56%)

Enrollment by Race/Ethnicity
Race/Ethnicity	Students
American Indian	6 (0.18%)
Asian	99 (3.01%)
Black	194 (5.89%)
Hispanic	364 (11.06%)
White	2,511 (76.30%)
Pacific Islander	6 (0.18%)
Two or More Races	111 (3.37%)

National School Lunch Program Eligibility
	Students
Free	761 (23.12%)
Reduced-Price	182 (5.53%)

== Athletics ==
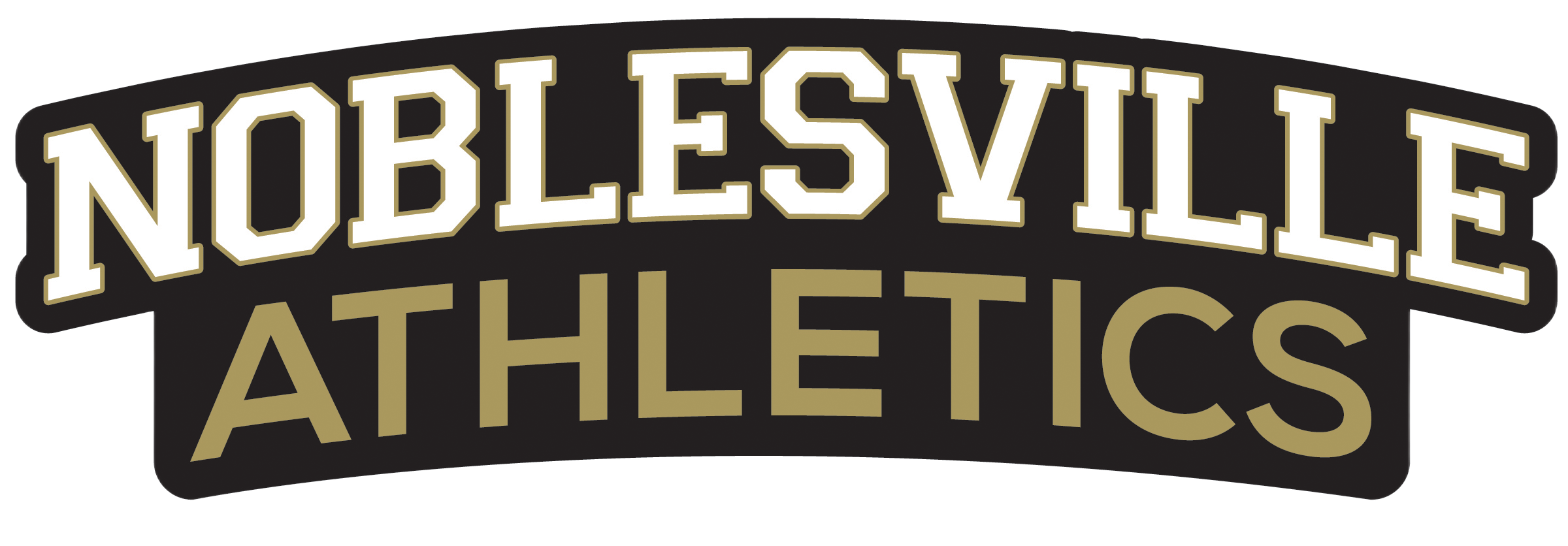

Noblesville High School's athletic teams are the Millers, and the school colors are black and gold. The school is a founding member of the Hoosier Crossroads Conference (HCC), a competitive league composed of large suburban schools in Central Indiana.

As a charter member of the Indiana High School Athletic Association (IHSAA), Noblesville competes in the highest possible classification for every team sport. This includes:

- Class 6A (Football)
- Class 3A (Soccer)
- Class 4A (Others)

=== Sports programs ===
The school has a comprehensive athletic program with at least 22 IHSAA-sanctioned varsity sports, including:

- Baseball (boys)
- Football (boys)
- Basketball
- Cross Country
- Golf
- Soccer
- Swimming and Diving
- Tennis
- Track and Field
- Wrestling
- Softball (girls)
- Volleyball (girls)

=== Facilities ===
Noblesville's primary athletic venues are located on the main high school campus, with several key facilities located at nearby district properties.

- The Mill: Main gymnasium, which hosts basketball, volleyball, and wrestling. It has a seating capacity of 4,204.
- Beaver Stadium: The football, track, and field stadium, which seats 4,500 and was completed in 2022.
- Natatorium: An 8-lane, 50-meter pool used for swimming and diving.
- Off-Campus Venues: The primary fields for baseball and soccer (Dunker Field) are located at the nearby Hazel Dell Elementary School campus. The golf teams use local courses, such as Fox Prairie. The bowling team competes at Bowl 32 in Noblesville.

=== Achievements ===
Noblesville has won 19 IHSAA state championships, ranking it among the top 20 most decorated schools in the state of Indiana.

IHSAA state championships include:

- Boys Soccer (3): 2021, 2022, and 2023.
- Girls Soccer (3): 2019, 2022, and 2023.
- Girls Basketball (2): 1987 and 2022.
- Boys Golf (2): 1995 and 1996.
- Girls Golf (2): 1986 and 1987.
- Boys Cross Country (1): 2022.
- Girls Cross Country (1): 2022.
- Baseball (1): 2014.
- Boys Track and Field (1): 1913.
- Unified Flag Football (3): 2018, 2019, and 2021.

== Student life ==
=== Coffee Mill ===
The Coffee Mill is a student-run coffee shop open from 8:00 to 8:40 a.m. on Thursdays and Fridays. Different student clubs and organizations manage the shop weekly as a fundraising initiative. Menu items typically include brewed coffee, hot chocolate, and seasonal specialty drinks.

=== Gold Mine ===
The Gold Mine is a student-operated snack and merchandise shop located inside the school. It sells packaged snacks, drinks, and Noblesville Millers spirit wear. Proceeds support extracurricular programs and student activities.

=== Miller Media ===
Noblesville High School maintains a student journalism program under Miller Media:

- NHS News – A daily broadcast news program produced by students for the entire school.
- Mill Stream – The school's print and online newspaper, publishing features, opinion pieces, and community coverage.

Both publications are hosted online at Miller Media Now.

=== Miller Mall ===
The Miller Mall is Noblesville Schools' official online store for spirit wear and branded merchandise. Purchases directly support district programs, with a portion of proceeds returned to the schools.

=== Shadow ===
The school's yearbook, titled Shadow, has been published annually since the early 20th century. Copies from past decades are archived and available through online yearbook collections.

=== Technology ===
All students are provided an iPad with a built-in keyboard and trackpad for use in their classes. Most coursework is available entirely online, and paper folders and notebooks are rarely used. It is recommended that students purchase a stylus or Apple Pencil for improved drawing and writing capabilities. The district technology department offers LTE-enabled iPads for students with limited access to an internet connection at home via the Every Miller Connected program.

== Notable alumni ==
- David Boudia – Olympic Gold Medalist in Diving; winner of the 10-meter platform at the 2012 London Olympics, Boudia is one of the most decorated American divers of the 21st century.
- Bryan Clauson – IndyCar and NASCAR driver; three-time USAC National Midget Series Champion and participant in the Indianapolis 500, Clauson was a beloved figure in motorsports before his death in 2016.
- Brandon Knight – NFL Offensive Tackle; played for the Dallas Cowboys and Baltimore Ravens after a standout college career at Indiana University. He appeared in 21 NFL games between 2019 and 2021.
- Ashley Prange – Professional golfer and reality TV winner; two-time Futures Tour campion and winner of Golf Channel's "Big Break V: Hawaii," Prange also competed in LPGA events and now coaches collegiate golf.
- Ashlynn Shade – UConn basketball guard and NCAA champion; named Indiana Gatorade Player of the Year in high school, Shade helped lead the UConn Huskies to an NCAA championship and earned Big East Sixth Player of the Year honors in 2025.
- Wes Whisler – Major League Baseball player; drafted by the Chicago White Sox, Whisler made his MLB debut in 2009 and was previously named Indiana's Mr. Baseball while at Noblesville High.

== See also ==
- List of high schools in Indiana
