= 2018 Medianeira school shooting =

School shooting in Paraná, Brazil

2018 Medianeira attack
- Location: João Manoel Mondrone State School, Medianeira, Paraná, Brazil
- Date: 28 September 2018
- Attack type: School shooting
- Weapons: Knives, bomb, garrucha pistol
- Deaths: 0
- Injuries: 2
- Perpetrators: 2 unnamed 15-year-olds
- Motive: School bullying

On the morning of 28 September 2018, at the João Manoel Mondrone State School in Medianeira, Paraná, two 15-year-old students shot two classmates, aged 15 and 18, before surrendering to authorities following an exchange of gunfire.

== Attack ==
At around 8:40 a.m., two 15-year-old students—one armed and the other providing cover for the attacker inside the João Manoel Mondrone State High School—launched an attack. Both were armed with a .22-caliber garrucha, a knife, explosives, aerosols, and fireworks bombs.

The pair headed to the first classroom, where their targets were, but upon arriving at the scene, they did not find them. After failing to find their targets, they went to a second classroom, where one of them pointed a firearm at the students and demanded that they leave. The students in the classroom at first thought this was a joke, and one of the perpetrators fired the gun through the window, hitting a 15-year-old student in the back. The shooting caused a stampede, during which an 18-year-old student was shot in the leg. Students elsewhere in the school began laying on the floor upon hearing the gunshots, while others ran out of the school in panic.

When the police arrived at the school, the pair fired shots at them while hiding inside a classroom. The police returned fire, but there were no further injuries.

In total, the pair fired six shots, wounding two students, one of them seriously. In addition to the gunfire, the pair also detonated homemade bombs.

== Perpetrators ==
The pair was identified as two 15-year-old students at the school; the parents of one of the students—who used the firearm—were guiding the teenager and were aware of the bullying he was suffering. The two victims who were shot had no connection to the teenager and did not bully him.

He had also named 11 classmates, blaming them for provoking the attack. He had started attending the school in 2018 and did not like being called "Zé Patrola" and "Gordo" by his classmates. The student had been inspired by other cases of school attacks, such as the Realengo massacre in 2011, carried out by Wellington Menezes de Oliveira. In addition, he recorded a video apologizing for the attack and saying he was anxious. No details were released about the second 15-year-old student, who provided cover during the attack.

== Victims ==
Two students, aged 15 and 18, were shot in the attack; one of them was seriously injured. The older student was found in the school hallway, and the younger one was found inside a classroom.

The 18-year-old student was grazed by a bullet in one of his legs, was treated, and was discharged shortly thereafter, on the same day.

Bruno Raphael Facundo, 15, was seriously injured in the attack. He was shot in the spine and rushed to the Municipal Hospital of Foz do Iguaçu, where he was later transferred by a SAMU helicopter to the Hospital do Trabalhador in Curitiba. The bullet that struck Raphael lodged in one of his vertebrae in the lumbar area.

On 2 October, the student was transferred to the Rehabilitation Hospital Center. Facundo was then discharged on 18 October.

== Consequences ==
On the same day, the father of one of the shooters was arrested for negligence and illegal possession of a firearm. He was released the following night after posting three bail bonds equal to the minimum wage.

The school that was attacked set 1 October as the date for students to return to class, with activities resuming as normal on 2 October. Security measures and measures to prevent bullying were implemented at the school.

On 13 October, the two students involved in the assault were sentenced to socio-educational measures for attempted murder and resisting arrest. One of the youths who carried the garrucha was also convicted of illegal possession of a firearm.

On 17 October, another armed invasion took place at a different school in Medianeira. Shortly before 1:00 p.m., a 20-year-old man armed with a replica of a pistol entered the Carlos Lacerda Municipal School, where he threatened everyone and pointed the pistol at a teacher. He fled by jumping over the school's wall but was later identified by the police and arrested.

Months after the attack, the pair were released. The first teenager, who had provided cover, left the Socio-Educational Center (Cense) in Cascavel on 16 February 2019. On 10 May 2019, the student who carried the firearm was released from the same facility.

== Reactions ==
The attack shocked the small community of Medianeira. Several students and parents shared their opinions on the attack, citing the lack of security in public schools across the country and the lack of attention paid to bullying in schools.

The Paraná Secretary of Education issued a statement, commenting: "The Regional Education Center of Foz do Iguaçu is in the school, providing all the necessary support to the school community. Classes were dismissed and should be resumed on Monday."
