= Noblesville Schools =

School district in Indiana, United States

Coordinates: 40°02′58.5″N 86°01′43.6″W

Address
- 18025 River Road Noblesville, Hamilton County, Indiana, 46060; United States

District information
- Motto: Engage, Inspire, Empower
- Grades: K-12
- Superintendent: Dr. Daniel Hile

Students and staff
- Students: 10,572
- Faculty: 1,348
- Teachers: About 750
- District mascot: Miller Man

Other information
- Website: www.noblesvilleschools.org

Noblesville Schools is a school district in Noblesville, Indiana, United States.

Its boundary includes much of Noblesville.

== Schools ==
The district operates the following schools:

=== Elementary ===
- Hazel Dell Elementary
- Hinkle Creek Elementary
- Noble Crossing Elementary
- North Elementary
- Promise Road Elementary
- Stony Creek Elementary
- White River Elementary

=== Middle school ===
- Noblesville East Middle School
- Noblesville West Middle School

=== High school ===
- Noblesville High School

== See also ==
- List of school districts in Indiana
