= Medianeira =

- Municipality
- Municipality of Medianeira
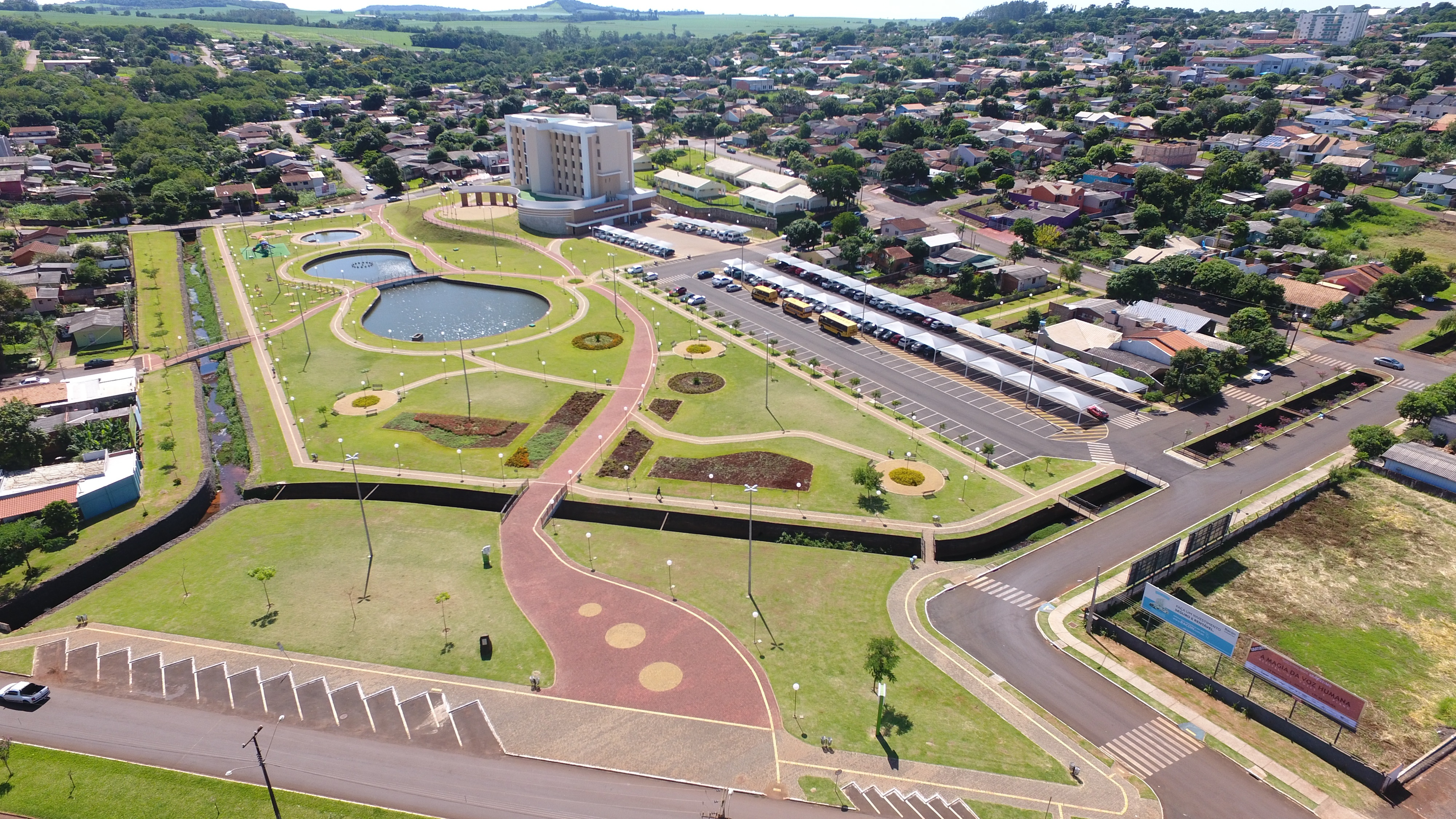
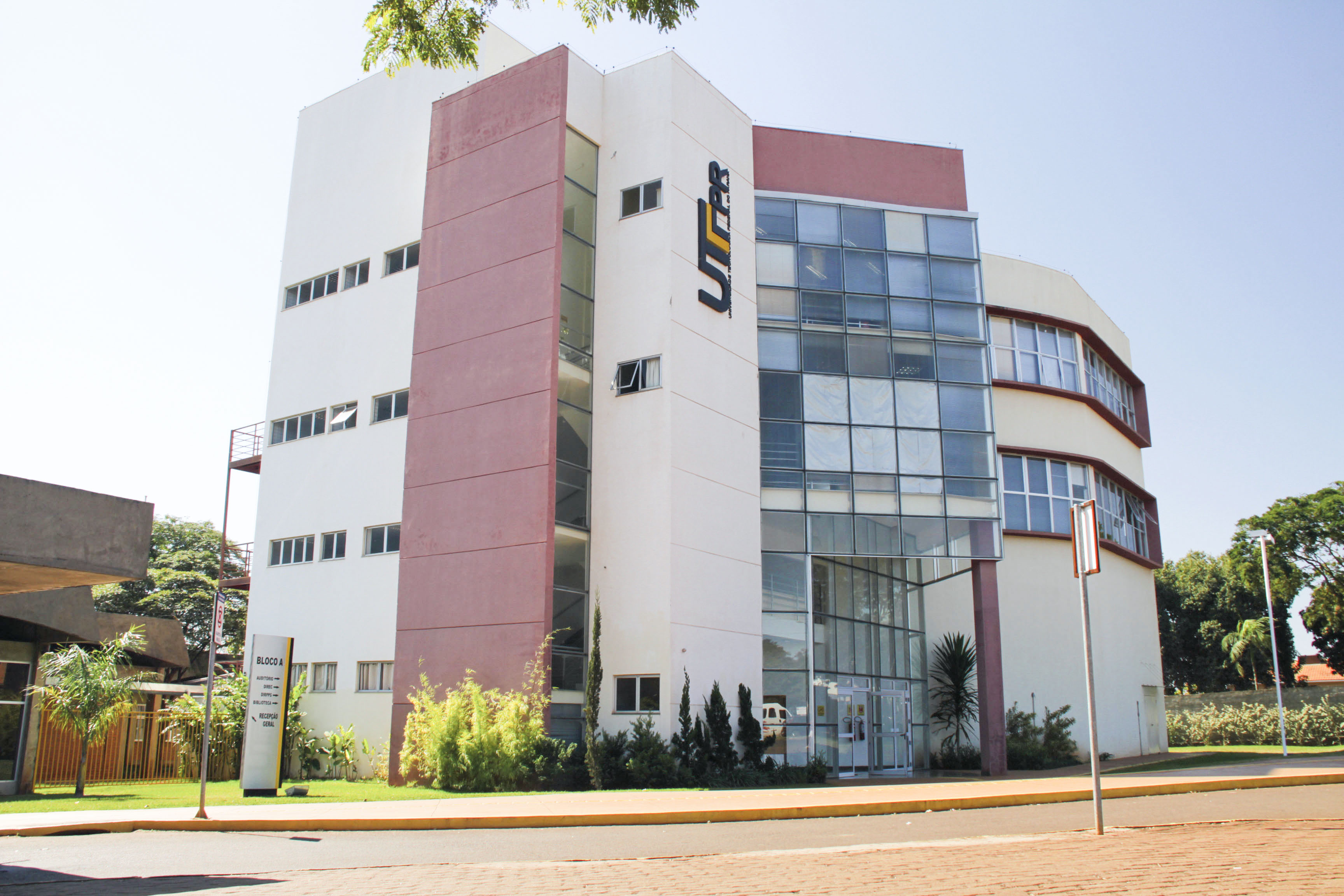
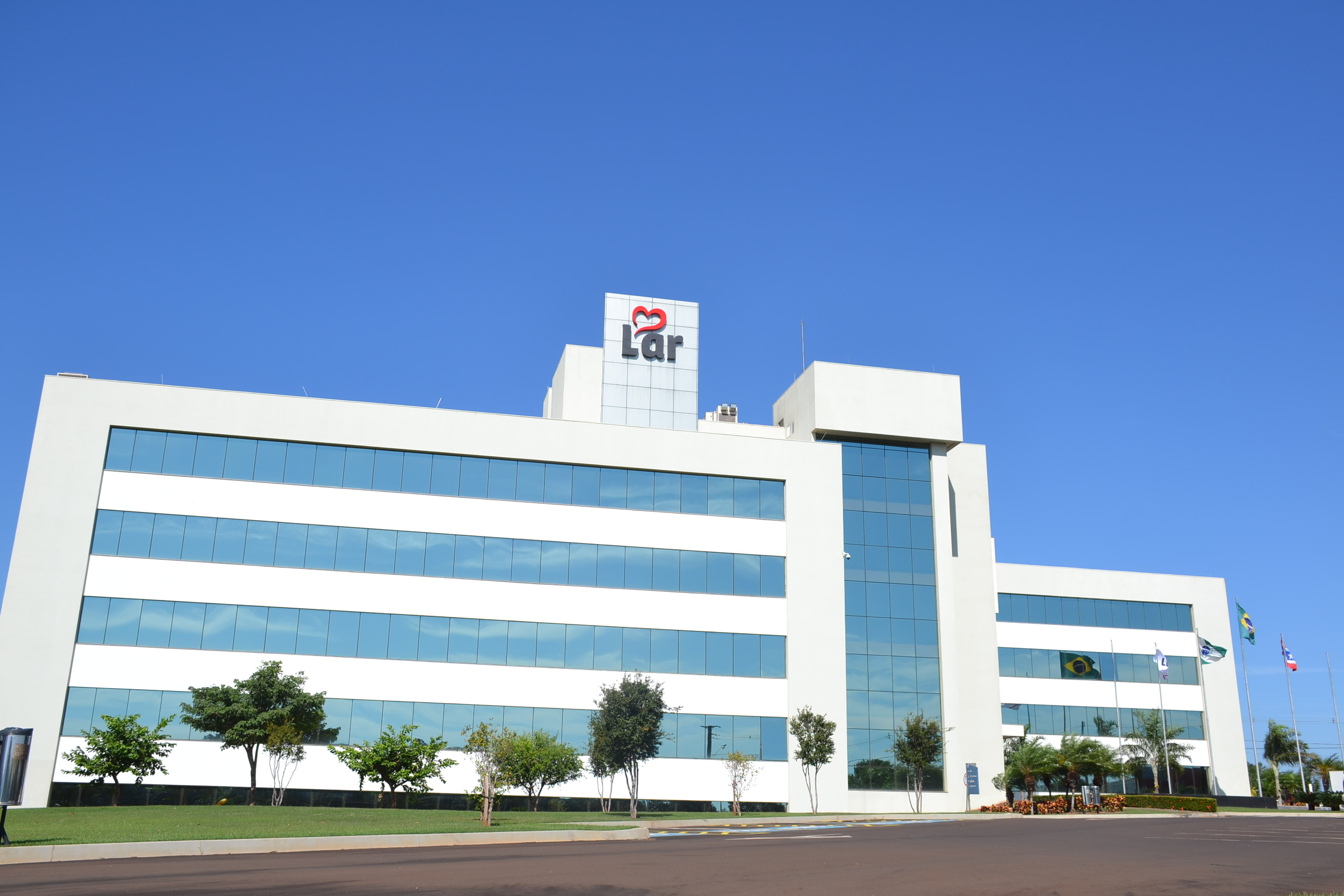
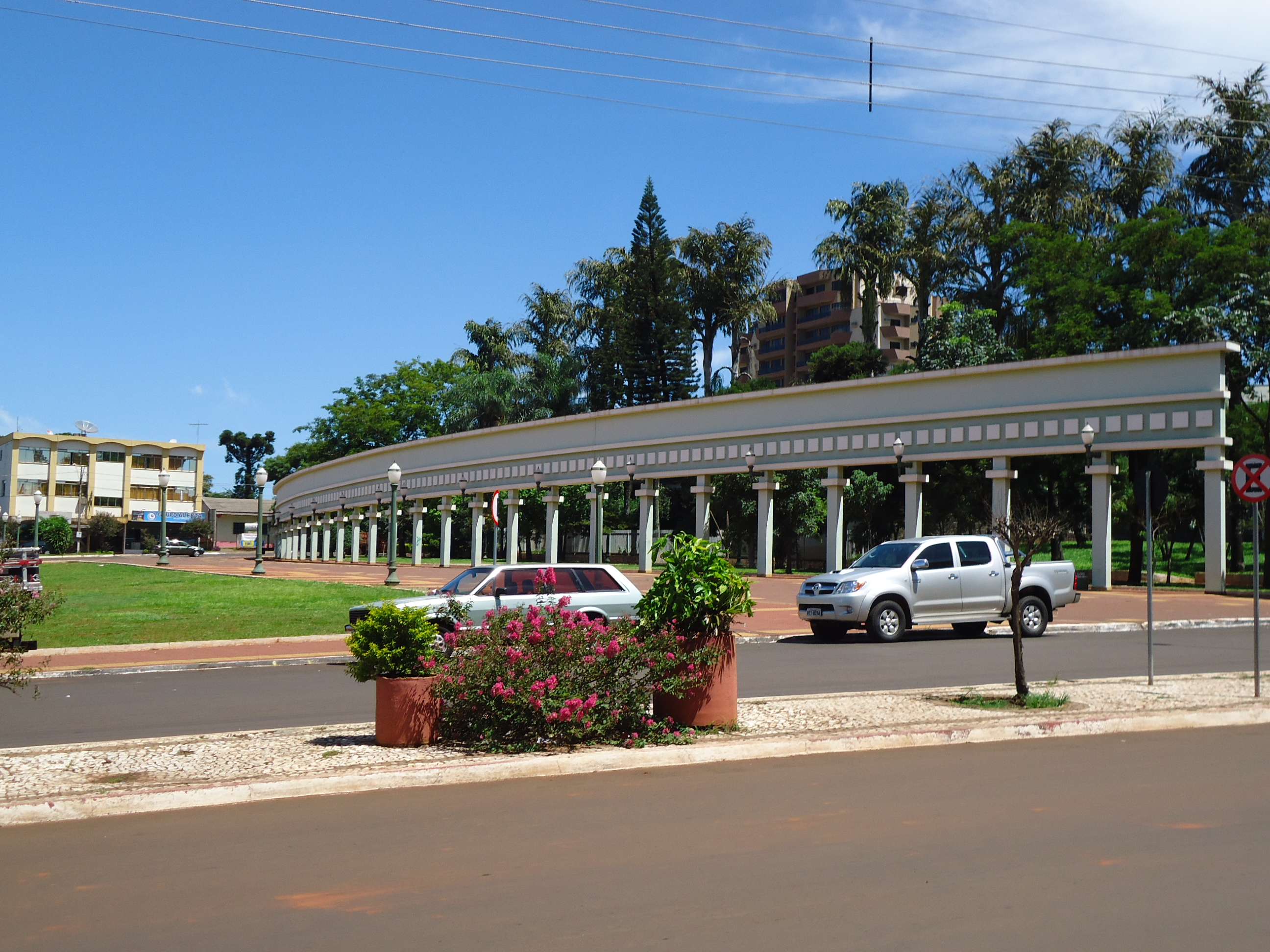
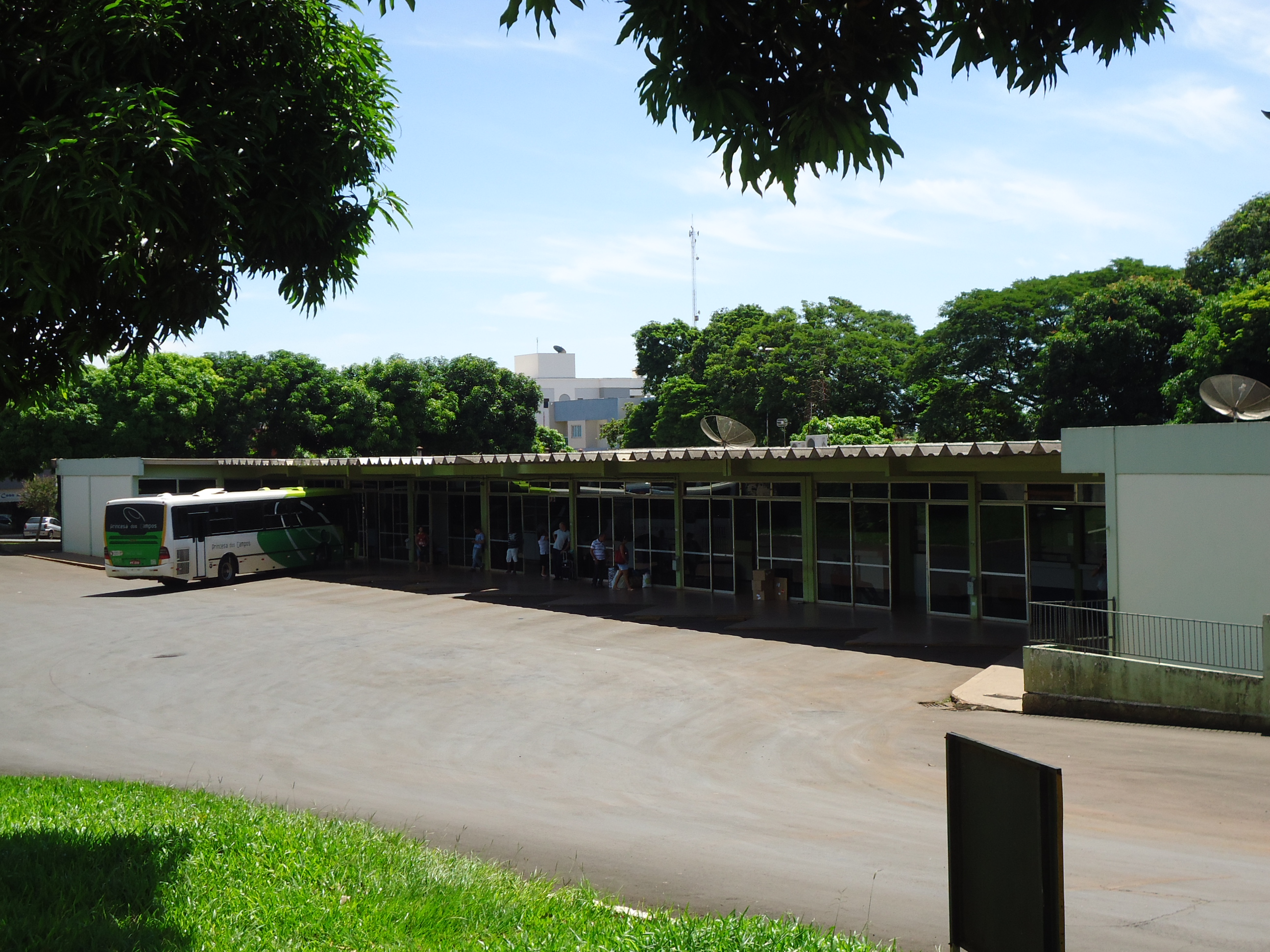

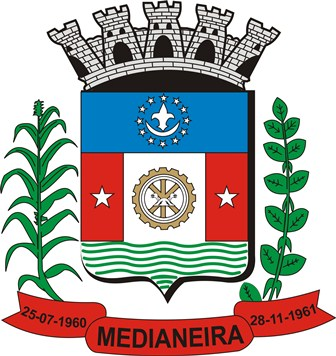
- Flag Coat of arms

- Location in Paraná
- Coordinates: 25°17′42″S 54°5′38″W
- Country: Brazil
- Region: South
- State: Paraná
- Founded: 10 October 1952

Government
  - Mayor: Antônio França

Area
  - Total: 328.733 km^{2} (126.925 sq mi)
- Elevation: 402 m (1,319 ft)

Population (2020)
  - Total: 46,574
  - Density: 127.25/km^{2} (329.6/sq mi)
- Time zone: UTC-3 (UTC-3)
- HDI (2010): 0.763 – high
- Website: medianeira.pr.gov.br

Medianeira is a municipality in the state of Paraná in Brazil. In 2020 it had 46,574 inhabitants. The agriculture-industrial sector is the base of the city's economy.
