= 2014 Seattle Pacific University shooting =

School shooting in Washington, US

Seattle Pacific University shooting
- Location: Seattle Pacific University; Seattle, Washington, US
- Date: June 5, 2014; 3:23 p.m. (PDT)
- Target: Students and staff at Seattle Pacific University
- Attack type: School shooting
- Weapons: Shotgun; knife
- Deaths: 1
- Injuries: 3 (2 from gunfire)
- Perpetrator: Aaron Ybarra
- Defender: Jon Meis
- Motive: Desire to commit mass murder; mental illness

The Seattle Pacific University shooting was a school shooting that occurred on June 5, 2014, at Seattle Pacific University in Seattle, Washington, United States. A gunman opened fire inside Otto Miller Hall, killing one student and injuring three others before being subdued by a student building monitor using pepper spray.

== Background ==
Aaron Ybarra, a 26-year-old man from Mountlake Terrace, Washington, had no connection to Seattle Pacific University. According to investigators, Ybarra had struggled with severe mental health issues and expressed fascination with previous mass shootings, including the Columbine High School massacre.

Police later stated that Ybarra intended to kill as many people as possible before dying by suicide.

== Shooting ==
Students speak about the shooting

On June 5, 2014, Ybarra arrived at the campus armed with a shotgun, additional ammunition, and a knife. At approximately 3:23 p.m., he entered Otto Miller Hall, a science and engineering building, and opened fire.

Student Paul Lee, 19, was fatally shot, while two other students sustained gunshot injuries. Another victim suffered minor injuries while fleeing the scene.

As Ybarra attempted to reload his shotgun, student building monitor Jon Meis confronted him with pepper spray and tackled him to the ground. Other students and security personnel assisted in restraining the gunman until police arrived.

The university campus was placed on lockdown while emergency responders treated victims and searched buildings.

== Investigation ==
Ybarra was arrested at the scene and charged with murder, attempted murder, and assault.

During the investigation, authorities recovered evidence indicating that Ybarra had planned a mass casualty attack and carried additional ammunition and a hunting knife.

In 2016, surveillance footage from Otto Miller Hall was publicly released following legal disputes over disclosure of the recordings. The footage showed Ybarra firing at victims before being subdued by Meis while attempting to reload his shotgun.

Later that year, a jury found Ybarra guilty of first-degree murder and multiple assault charges.

== See also ==
- Crime in Washington
- 2014 Isla Vista attacks, another attack which also targeted a university
- 2014 Marysville Pilchuck High School shooting, another school shooting in Washington that year
