= 2014 Columbia Mall shooting =

2014 fatal mall shooting in Maryland

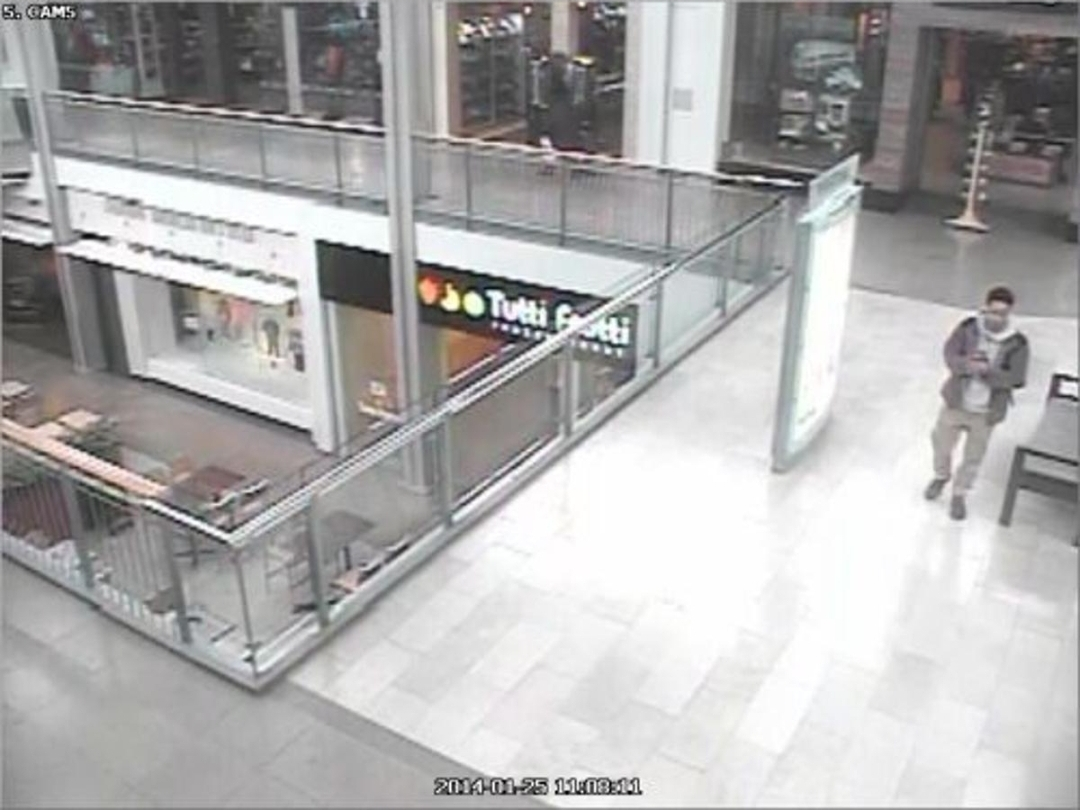
- Darion Marcus Aguilar minutes prior to the attack
- Location: 39.215°N 76.861°W; Columbia, Maryland, US
- Date: January 25, 2014; 11:14 AM (UTC-5)
- Attack type: Murder-suicide; double-homicide
- Weapons: Pistol grip Mossberg 500 12-gauge shotgun; homemade explosives (unused)
- Deaths: 3 (including the perpetrator)
- Injuries: 5 (1 by gunfire)
- Perpetrator: Darion Marcus Aguilar
- Motive: Unknown

On January 25, 2014, a shooting occurred at The Mall in Columbia in Columbia, Maryland. Nineteen-year-old Darion Marcus Aguilar, a resident of College Park, Maryland, shot and killed two employees before committing suicide in the mall. An additional five others sustained injuries from the shooting.

== Background ==
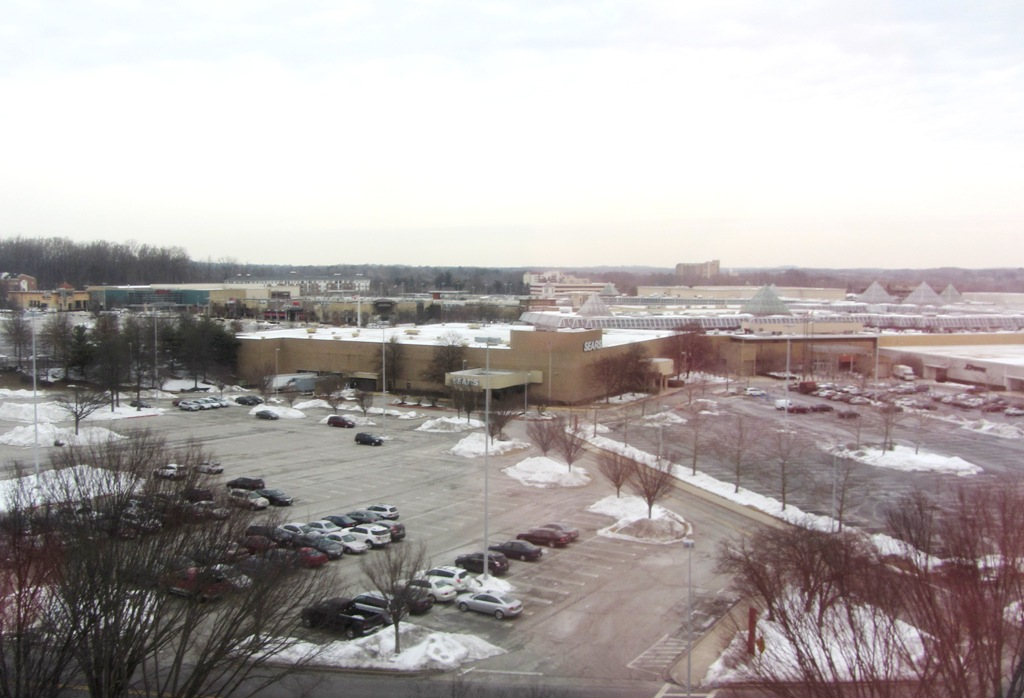
The Mall in Columbia pictured in 2015

The Mall In Columbia, also referred to as Columbia Mall, is the central shopping mall of Columbia, Maryland. It is home to over 200 specialty stores, with anchor stores including AMC Theatres, Lidl, Main Event Entertainment, Barnes & Noble, JCPenney, Macy's, and Nordstrom. The attack began at and primarily took place inside and around the Zumiez store located on the second floor.

=== Gun Violence in Maryland ===
Maryland alongside Delaware, New Jersey, and Washington D.C. is one of only 10 states that had more homicides than suicides committed with a firearm in 2020, according to a Harvard University study. In Maryland, suicides accounted for just over a third of all firearm-related deaths in 2021, compared to 54% nationwide. Homicides accounted for 66% of firearm-related deaths in Maryland and 43% nationwide.

== Shooting ==
On January 25, 2014, Darion Marcus Aguilar entered The Mall in Columbia around 10:15 A.M, wearing a backpack which contained a disassembled pistol grip, a Mossberg 500 12-gauge shotgun, two homemade explosives, and multiple rounds of ammunition. He was noted to be dressed similarly to one of the perpetrators of the Columbine shooting. At around 11:15 A.M., Aguilar entered the dressing room of the Zumiez store located on the second floor, assembled his shotgun, and posted a selfie to his Tumblr account before exiting the room. After stepping out of the dressing room, Aguilar fired one shot at Brianna Benelo, the first victim, then fired multiple times at Tyler Johnson near the front of the store. Aguilar next exited the store and fired two shots across the mall's upper floor; one struck the railing, while the other hit a woman in her heel. Aguilar turned towards the food court and fired one shot striking a wall right outside the Great American Cookie store, narrowly missing several customers who were inside. Aguilar next turned back to the Zumiez store and fired through the glass, striking a mannequin, before entering the store and fatally shooting himself in the mouth. Police stated it was hard to approach and identify Aguilar as his backpack contained a large quantity of explosives and ammunition, leading to fears that it was booby-trapped. The mall was declared secured by law enforcement at around 12:30 P.M. Approximately two-and-a-half hours after the attack, Aguilar's mother would report him missing.

== Perpetrator ==
Darion Marcus Aguilar (January 4, 1995 - January 25, 2014) was identified as the shooter after the attack. He had lived in College Park, Maryland on Hollywood Road with his mother, and at the time of the shooting was employed as a manager at Dunkin' Donuts. Authorities found Aguilar had no contact with Maryland's mental health system nor had a criminal record.

Aguilar went to James Hubert Blake High School in Silver Spring, Maryland and graduated in 2013. Tydryn Scott, a former school lab partner of Aguilar's, described him as quiet and interested in skateboarding, and that he primarily hung out with other skaters.

In April 2013, Aguilar went to a physician for an undisclosed medical condition, and while there he informed doctors he was hearing voices. According to law enforcement, the doctor's notes describe the content of the voices as being nonspecific, nonviolent, and not directing him to doing anything. Aguilar's physician provided a referral to a mental health professional, but there was no evidence of any follow-up appointments being made. Recovered web searches showed that Aguilar had frequented suicide chat lines and websites that dealt with mental health issues in the months leading up to the shooting.

In December 2013, Aguilar purchased a pistol grip as well as a Mossberg 500 12-gauge shotgun, the same gun later used in the attack, at a United Gun Shop along with cartons of buckshot and birdshot ammunition.

After the attack, a search warrant executed by law enforcement at Aguilar's residence discovered a personal journal in which he described wanting to kill people but did not mention specific persons nor locations; police also remarked that he "expressed a general hatred of others" and a "willingness to die". In addition, the journal contained an apology to Aguilar's family for "what he was about to do".

Just minutes before the attack, Aguilar made a post to his Tumblr page in which he stated: "I had to do this. Today is the day. On previous days I tried this I woke up with anxiety, regret and hope for a better future this day I didn't, I woke up felt no emotions no empathy no sympathy." Aguilar also was allegedly fascinated by the Columbine High School massacre and was hypothesized to have timed his attack for the minute the Columbine shooting began.

== Victims ==
The victims were identified as 21-year-old Brianna Benelo, a single mother who lived in College Park, and 25-year-old Tyler Johnson of Mount Airy, Maryland. Neither of the victims were known to be connected to the shooter.

== Aftermath ==
Following the attack, hundreds gathered for a vigil honoring the victims lost in the shooting. The vigil was held on the evening of January 31, 2014, at the outdoor memorial on The Plaza. Candles were available to all attendees. Two funds were created for the two victims: the Tyler Johnson Memorial Fund, established to benefit the Community Foundation of Howard County, and the Brianna Benlolo Memorial Fund, established to benefit the son of the first victim.

== See also ==
- Crime in Maryland
