= 2006 Pine Middle School shooting =

School shooting in Reno, Nevada

- Location: 39.4800°N 119.7808°W; Reno, Nevada, U.S.
- Date: March 14, 2006; 20 years ago 8:57 a.m. (UTC-8)
- Target: Students and staff at Pine Middle School
- Attack type: School shooting, attempted murder
- Weapon: .38-caliber revolver
- Deaths: 0
- Injuries: 2
- Victims: Alexander Rueda; Kenzie McKeon
- Perpetrator: James Scott Newman

The Pine Middle School shooting was a school shooting that occurred in Reno, Nevada, United States, on March 14, 2006. The shooting was perpetrated by then fourteen-year-old student James Scott Newman who shot and injured two 14-year-old eighth grade classmates with a .38-caliber revolver that had belonged to his parents. Newman was arrested and charged as an adult on charges of attempted murder, use of a deadly weapon and use of a firearm by a minor but later pleaded guilty to different charges of two counts of battery with a deadly weapon, in which he had received sentencing as a juvenile. James Newman was sentenced to house arrest until he completed 200 hours of community service.

On March 25, 2008, athletics teacher Jencie Fagan, who was hailed a hero for her confrontation with the shooter, was selected as one of the three national winners for the Above & Beyond Citizen Honor from the Congressional Medal of Honor Society at a ceremony in Washington, D.C.

== Shooting ==
On the day of the shooting, the start of school had been delayed by snow and not all students had arrived when the shooting began. Just before 9:00 a.m. (UTC-8), fourteen-year-old student James Scott Newman brought his mother's .38-caliber revolver to the school in his backpack. He removed the concealed pistol from his coat pocket and loaded it with three .38 caliber rounds while in the bathroom. He chose his target, student Alexander Rueda, 14, at random in a hallway outside the cafeteria. Before he started firing, a friend of Newman yelled at him to put the gun away, but Newman told him to run. He pulled the trigger twice but the gun did not fire because those chambers were empty. He then fired three times at Rueda. One bullet hit Rueda in the arm and torso, and another ricocheted and hit student Kenzie McKeon, 14, in the leg from the shrapnel. The two injured students had no prior relationship or arguments with Newman. Several students and teachers heard the shots and the physical education teacher, Jencie Fagan, approached Newman and challenged him. Fagan managed to convince Newman to drop his gun and then restrained him until more staff arrived to help.

Alexander Rueda was treated at Washoe Medical Center for his wounds and released the same day, while Kenzie McKeon only needed to be treated at the scene for superficial wounds. The school was placed on lockdown for an hour and then classes were canceled for the remainder of the day. The shooting was the second firearm-related incident on Pine Middle School grounds in two weeks, with the previous incident being a man brandishing a gun towards the campus. On that occasion school administrators sent students home as a precaution.

=== Motive ===
After the shooting, Newman was interviewed by the police and remained determined that he did not want his parents to be present during questioning, however Newman's father had arrived sometime after to ask for the questioning to stop until a lawyer would be consulted. During questioning Newman stated that he wanted to use the attack as a way to end abuse from his father, brother, and others. He said he was tired of being called "stupid" by them. He researched the Columbine High School massacre on the Internet and planned the attack about a week in advance. He conclusively decided against using a knife because "he did not want to be up close when blood came out of any of the victims". The night before the attack, Newman's father had given him a collection of ammunition which included three live .38 caliber rounds. When his parents left the house to eat, he took his mother's handgun from a small safe in his father's closet and hid it in his backpack.

== Aftermath ==
Following the shooting, police arrested James Newman and booked him as an adult on charges of suspicion of attempted murder, use of a deadly weapon and use of a firearm by a minor in Washoe County Jail with a bail of $150,000. However, his trial was put on hold as prosecutors discussed whether he should be tried as an adult or juvenile. Washoe District Attorney Richard Gammick had announced on March 17 that the evidence given did not support Newman being charged as an adult. By May 2006, Newman was tried as a juvenile by the Jan Evans Juvenile Justice Center for the charges of two counts of battery with a deadly weapon, instead of the initial charges and was put under house arrest until he completed 200 hours of community service.

On March 25, 2008, Jencie Fagan was selected as one of three national winners and the Nevada finalist for an Above & Beyond Citizen Honor from the Congressional Medal of Honor Society in the Washington, D.C. ceremony, being recognized for her role in prevention of any further incident in the shooting.

== See also ==
- List of attacks related to secondary schools
- List of school shootings
