= 2018 Ocala school shooting =

School shooting in Florida, U.S.

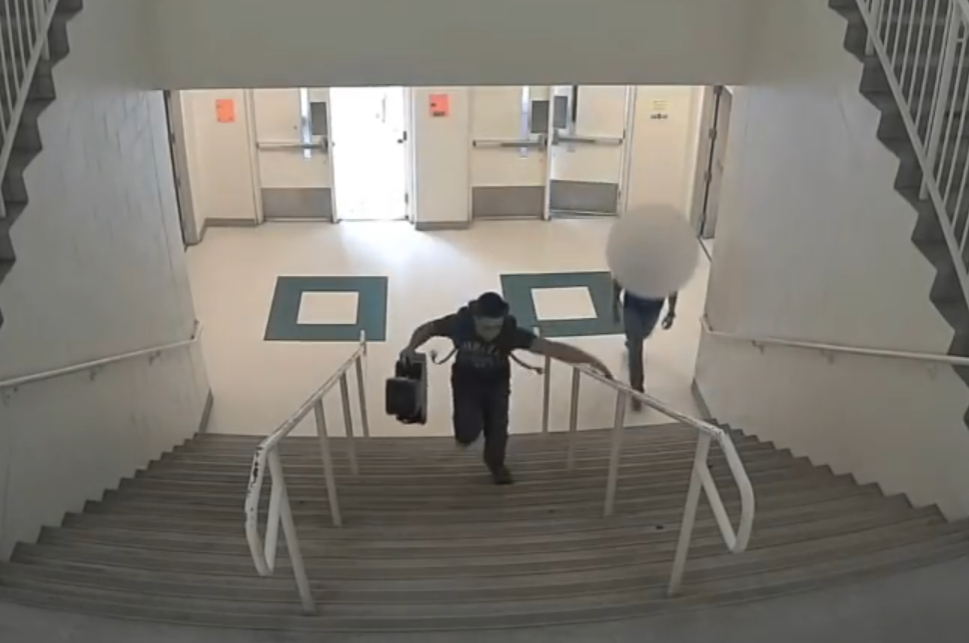
- A CCTV still of Bouche, carrying a guitar case containing a pump-action shotgun up the stairs to the second floor shortly before the shooting.
- Location: 29°08′39″N 82°03′59″W; Marion County, Florida, U.S.
- Date: April 20, 2018; 8 years ago 8:29 – 8:42 a.m. (CDT; UTC−05:00)
- Target: Forest High School
- Attack type: School shooting
- Weapons: Sawed-off 16-gauge Winchester Model 12 pump-action shotgun; Knife (Unused)
- Injuries: 1
- Perpetrator: Sky Bouche
- Motive: Depression; Columbine copycat crime
- Verdict: Guilty on all counts
- Convictions: 8 counts (Note: Terrorism; Aggravated Assault with a Firearm; Culpable Negligence; Carrying a Concealed Firearm; Possession of a Firearm on School Property; Possession of a Short-Barreled Shotgun; Interference in a School Function; Armed Trespassing on School Property)
- Litigation: $30,000 lawsuit filed by victim.

On April 20, 2018, a school shooting occurred at Forest High School, a high school in Marion County, Florida, United States, near Ocala, when 19-year-old Sky Bouche, a former student of the school, went on school premises armed with a sawed-off 16-gauge Winchester Model 12 pump-action shotgun and wearing a black tactical vest. He shot once through a classroom door and a piece of the door hit one student in his ankle, injuring him. Feeling immediate regret, Bouche surrendered to the school staff. He was soon arrested and taken into custody.

In 2021, Bouche was sentenced to 30 years imprisonment for the shooting, with the possibility of parole only after 25 years, followed by an additional 30 years of probationary release.

The school received widespread criticism for its handling of the shooting, particularly for its lack of security to prevent people from accessing the school's parking lot and main building during school hours. In 2022, the sole victim of the shooting sued the school district.

== Background ==
Forest High School is a high school near Ocala, Florida, United States. It has an EMIT (engineering) program and two magnet programs, college and Career Advanced Placement (CCAP) and the Entrepreneurship Program. The school's colors are green and gold and the school mascot is the Wildcat. It is in the Marion County School District. The student population as of the 2023–2024 school year is 2,383 students.

== Shooting ==
Deputy Long's body-camera footage of Bouche's arrest

On April 20, 2018, at 8:29 a.m, 19-year-old former student Sky Bouche went on school premises armed with a sawed-off 16-gauge Winchester Model 12 pump-action shotgun, a black tactical vest, a knife, and a blue backpack full of gloves and shotgun shells. Bouche shot once through a classroom door and a piece of the door hit 17-year-old Evan Eckenroth in the ankle, injuring him. Immediately regretting his actions, Bouche then surrendered to a nearby teacher, Kelly Panasuk (née McManis). Panasuk allowed Bouche to wait inside her classroom until police arrived, with at least 15 other students inside. Marion County Sheriff's Office School Resource Deputy James "Jimmy" Long soon arrested Bouche and took him into custody. SWAT officers swept the school afterwards in search of any weapons or explosives. All students were then taken to the First Baptist Church of Ocala by bus, where their parents gathered to pick them up.

== Legal proceedings ==
In court, Bouche claimed that after he shot through the classroom door and realized he hit a student, he felt remorse as he began to realize the reality of what he was doing, saying it "wasn’t what he truly wanted." Dennis Gonzalez was appointed as Bouche's defense attorney. Bouche was charged with terrorism, aggravated assault with a firearm, armed burglary, culpable negligence, carrying a concealed firearm, possession of a firearm on school property, Possession of a short-barreled shotgun, interference in a school function, and armed trespassing on school property. On May 1, Bouche pled not guilty to all of the charges.

In 2021, Bouche was convicted on all of the charges except armed burglary, and was sentenced to 30 years imprisonment, with the possibility of parole only after 25 years, followed by an additional 30 years of probationary release. After Bouche was sentenced, he claimed that he heavily regretted the incident and that he "deserved to be put away."

== Perpetrator ==
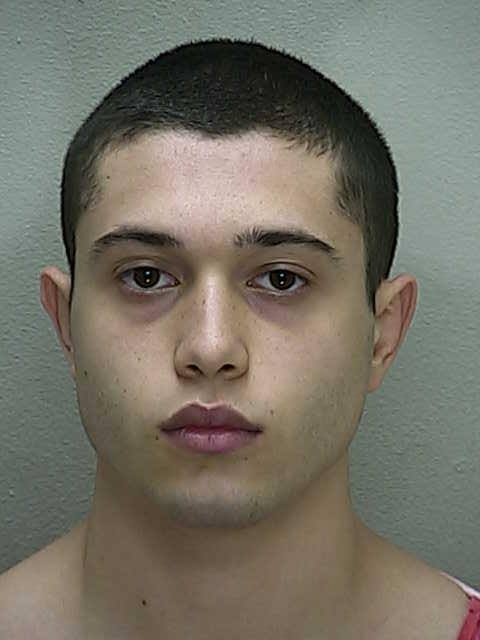
Bouche's mugshot after his arrest

Sky Bouche (born June 5, 1998) is a former student of Forest High School. He lived in Crystal River prior to the shooting. Bouche struggled with mental health issues due to his violent home life, as his entire family suffered from bipolar and schizophrenia. Bouche had become obsessed with the Columbine High School massacre sometime during his middle school years, and made several posts online supporting the incident in October 2013. Bouche had planned on joining the United States Marine Corps in an attempt to get away from his family, however in 2016, he dropped out of Forest High School after he discovered that Florida's Baker Act prevented him from joining the Marine Corps due to his online behavior.

Bouche had decided to shoot up his former high school following the Parkland high school shooting, in an attempt to spread awareness of his mental state. He chose to do it on April 20 since it was the 19th anniversary of the Columbine High School massacre.

== Aftermath ==
All of the schools in the Marion County School District were scheduled to have gun-reform walkouts later that day. They were all cancelled following the shooting. Four days later, the school board approved to pay $224,000 for 34 new resource officers to protect the schools belonging to the Marion County School District for the remaining four weeks of the school year. On May 21, Panasuk received the Woman of Courage Award during an event at the College of Central Florida's Klein Center for how she handled the shooting. On June 20, Deputy Long was labeled "Florida School Resource Officer Of The Year" for his involvement in arresting Bouche.

The shooting had occurred only two months after the Parkland high school shooting, only four hours from where Ocala was located. After the body-cam footage of the incident was released a month later on May 31, the school was met with much criticism for how they handled the shooting, particularly Panasuk for allowing Bouche into her classroom full of students. A local sheriff stated that since he was still armed with a knife, Panasuk put all of the students inside the classroom in "extreme danger". The school responded by saying Panasuk may receive counseling before she is allowed to continue her job the following school year.

=== Lawsuit ===
On February 8, 2022, Evan Eckenroth, the student injured in the shooting, filed a lawsuit against the Marion County School District, seeking over $30,000 worth of damages. In the suit, Eckenroth claimed that the district "failed to have proper security measures in place to protect students and keep non-students from accessing the school's parking lot and main building during school hours." Eckenroth also claimed to have received permanent scars and mental anguish from the incident. Per the Marion County Clerk of Courts, as of December 2025 the lawsuit is still ongoing.
