= Sol Pais =

American student, subject of a 2019 manhunt

- Picture handed out by authorities during the manhunt
- Born: Sol Leonina Pais; February 1, 2001; Miami-Dade County, Florida, U.S.
- Died: April 15, 2019 (aged 18); Idaho Springs, Colorado, U.S.
- Cause of death: Suicide by gunshot
- Occupation: Student
- Known for: Subject of FBI manhunt in 2019
- Relatives: Edgardo “Gardi” Pais (father)

Sol Leonina Pais (February 1, 2001 – April 15, 2019) was an American student who received national attention after she became the suspect in a large FBI manhunt in 2019. Pais had flown from Miami to Colorado and purchased a shotgun from a private dealer. After her parents informed authorities that she was missing, she was traced to Colorado. Police designated Pais as Armed and Dangerous; a BOLO alert was put out, and a large manhunt ensued.

After Pais was reported as missing, Miami police discovered her alleged infatuation with the Columbine High School massacre, particularly with its perpetrators, Eric Harris and Dylan Klebold. With the 20th anniversary of the massacre about a week away, and Pais showing intent to purchase a shotgun in Colorado, police believed she was planning a copycat massacre around April 20. On April 15, she committed suicide by a self-inflicted gunshot wound, before the manhunt began. Her body was found on April 17.

== Biography ==
Sol Pais was born on February 1, 2001, in Miami-Dade County, Florida to Argentine parents hailing from Buenos Aires. Her father, Gardi, is a musician. According to other students at Miami Beach Senior High School, Pais was very quiet and high-achieving academically. Pais was taking Honors English and Advanced Placement Studio Art classes and "did not strike classmates or teachers as deeply troubled".

Another student who shared a class with Pais stated, "I didn't believe it – I didn't understand it. She's so quiet. How could someone so quiet be like that?" Other students also described Pais as keeping mostly to herself, wearing baggy T-shirts, jeans and boots, and, often, earphones as she listened to music. She was reportedly a fan of KMFDM, a band frequently associated with Columbine due to Harris and Klebold also having been fans.

=== Journal and online activity ===
Pais allegedly kept an online personal journal for months before her suicide. In it, she describes herself as "the face of loneliness and misery, of isolation and anger, of exhaustion and anxiety, of anguish and grace." In an entry from July 2018, she wrote, "I wish I could get a gun by the end of the summer." The journal also included drawings of firearms, a bloody knife, and a mention of dreaming about a shotgun. Pais appeared to have stopped writing journal entries in November 2018, but resumed in February 2019, in which she wrote, "The last few days have been especially painful and tumultuous, which kickstarted me again to start reviving my plans and getting on with them". The last journal entry is dated March 30, 2019.

Pais used the handle "Dissolved Girl", a reference to the Massive Attack song of the same name, to post her journal online, and post several times on the National Gun Forum, asking about how to acquire a shotgun in Colorado while living in Florida. She received several answers on the forum, thanked the other users, and was able to purchase a shotgun in Colorado from a private seller.

== Manhunt ==
=== Prelude ===
Pais was last seen in Florida on Sunday, April 14, 2019, at around 10 p.m. EST by her mother. Pais left her house around 6:15 a.m. on Monday, April 15, and texted her mother approximately 15 minutes later, telling her that she "was going to attend an art history review after school" to explain her absence later in the day. Pais then went to Miami International Airport, having bought three one-way tickets to Denver, Colorado days before. After arriving in Colorado later that morning, Pais bought a pump-action shotgun and ammunition from a dealer in Littleton, Colorado, that she had previously been in contact with. She then took an Uber from the gun shop "into the mountains" near Mount Evans. According to this Uber driver, Pais "had no food or water and only minimal clothing," and had a "green rifle case" with a "bird hunting gun". Pais committed suicide by gunshot to the head later that night, before the manhunt had begun.

=== Manhunt ===
On April 16, the captain of the Miami Beach Police Department alerted agents with the FBI field office in Miami about a "potential school shooter who is infatuated with Columbine shooter Eric Harris". Shortly after Pais was reported missing, investigators gained access to Pais' email, which revealed information for the gun sellers Pais had contacted in Florida. The FBI contacted one of Pais' Uber drivers, who described Pais as cheerful and fluent in Spanish, and had "travelled to Colorado for recreation and was excited to see snow".

At this point, the FBI decided to alert the public due to the danger of a copycat shooting around April 20 at or near Columbine High School, although April 20 was a Saturday. After the manhunt became public, it quickly made national headlines, with hundreds calling the FBI claiming they had seen Pais panhandling, buying a gun, or outside of Columbine High School. Columbine High School went on lockdown on the afternoon of April 16, and was dismissed normally at the end of the day. With the FBI finding no trace of Pais by the end of the day, Columbine and several dozen other schools closed on April 17, keeping more than 500,000 students across Colorado home.

== Aftermath ==
The FBI confirmed in a tweet on April 17 that Pais had been discovered deceased in the mountains, claiming that "there is no longer a threat to the community." After Pais was confirmed to be deceased, school operations largely returned to normal in the Jefferson County area. Sheriff Jeff Shrader stated, "We want our schools to be a safe place for kids to learn and where they can be productive. And that's why we took this threat seriously". An audit by the Department of Justice Office of the Inspector General on the incident was conducted after pressure from lawmakers, which suggested upgrades to the FBI's National Instant Criminal Background Check System (NICS). In 2021, the FBI agreed to implement changes in its system. In 2024, state lawmaker Tom Sullivan raised the case to argue for a mandatory waiting period for Colorado gun buyers.

== See also ==
- Columbine effect
