= Columbine effect =

Legacy of the 1999 Columbine massacre

The Columbine effect is the legacy and impact of the Columbine High School massacre ("Columbine"), which occurred on April 20, 1999, at Columbine High School in Columbine, Colorado. The shooting has had an effect on school safety, policing tactics, prevention methods (including gun control and metal detectors), and inspired numerous copycat crimes, with many perpetrators taking inspiration from Eric Harris and Dylan Klebold, often describing them as martyrs or heroes and imitating their methods or outward styles. Dozens more threats never made the news.

As of 2024, the Columbine massacre has been directly linked to at least 50 other mass shootings that have left over 300 people dead and over 500 wounded. Columbine has also had a significant impact on popular culture, with Harris and Klebold often depicted and referenced in several forms of media. Media stories often reference Harris, Klebold, and the massacre whenever another school shooting occurs.

== Background ==
On April 20, 1999, two Columbine High School seniors Eric Harris and Dylan Klebold murdered 13 students, one teacher, and injured 23 others. About 49 minutes after the shooting began, Harris and Klebold committed suicide in the library, where most of their victims died. At the time, it was the deadliest shooting at a high school in American history. The shooting was the most covered news story of 1999, and third most followed by the American public of the entire decade, surpassing the death of John F. Kennedy Jr., the Kosovo War, and the impeachment trial of Bill Clinton.

== Effects on schools ==
Following the Columbine shooting, schools across the United States instituted new security measures such as transparent backpacks, metal detectors, school uniforms, and security guards. Some schools implemented the numbering of school doors to improve public safety response. Several schools throughout the country resorted to requiring students to wear computer-generated IDs.

Schools also adopted a zero-tolerance approach to possession of weapons and threatening behavior by students. Some social science experts feel the zero-tolerance approach adopted in schools has been implemented too harshly, with unintended consequences that create other problems.

In addition to this, the shooting also affected student speech rights. School officials became more concerned about student expression, especially if it was violent or threatening. Some students believe these changes put their First Amendment right to free speech at risk, while other students believe their right to safety while on school grounds is more important. There have been legal battles over the zero tolerance approach. Different judges have had varying interpretations of what constitutes a genuine threat and how much discretion school officials should have in regulating student speech. This has made it a complex issue for schools and courts to balance safety and freedom of expression.

== Police tactics ==
Police departments have reassessed their tactics and have since trained for Columbine-like situations after criticism over the slow response and progress of the SWAT teams during the shooting. First responders face numerous challenges when entering situations like this.

Training has been increased and now includes quick deployment rules while schools are rethinking emergency policies. The Pacifica Police Department has created a tactical playbook that gives planning and equips responders with strategic direction for coordinating responses between agencies when facing mass violence.

Police followed a traditional tactic at Columbine: surround the building, set up a perimeter, and contain the damage. This protocol was usually utilized in hostage situations to prevent putting officers or bystanders in danger, with the goal of establishing contact with the perpetrator(s) and attempting to calm the situation or negotiate with them. The contain-and-wait approach has been replaced by a tactic known as the Immediate Action Rapid Deployment tactic. This tactic calls for a team to advance into the site of any ongoing shooting, but even with just a single officer if more are not available. In fact, the majority of active shooters are stopped by a single officer. Police officers using this tactic are trained to move toward the sound of gunfire in formation and neutralize the shooter as quickly as possible. There has been widespread adoption of high-strength body armor and patrol rifles by police departments across the United States in response to the increased active shooter threat. Their goal is to stop the shooter at all costs; they are to walk past wounded victims, as the aim is to prevent the shooter from killing or wounding more. Dave Cullen, author of Columbine, has stated: "The active protocol has proved successful at numerous shootings...At Virginia Tech alone, it probably saved dozens of lives."

The Russian Prosecutor General's Office actively sought to deter incitement to commit such copycat attacks. On 2 February 2022, with immediate effect, the Russian Supreme Court declared the "Columbine" movement as a terrorist group. While the motivation for the ruling is unknown, terrorist activity in Russia is punishable by a sentence of life imprisonment.

== Influence on other shootings ==
The Columbine shootings influenced subsequent school shootings, with several such plots mentioning it. According to psychiatrist Edwin Fuller Torrey of the Treatment Advocacy Center, a legacy of the Columbine shootings is its "allure to disaffected youth". Sociologist Ralph Larkin examined twelve major school shootings in the US in the eight years following Columbine and found that in eight of the twelve shootings "the shooters made explicit reference to Harris and Klebold".

A 2015 investigation by CNN identified "more than 40 people...charged with Columbine-style plots". A 2014 investigation by ABC News identified "at least 17 attacks and another 36 alleged plots or serious threats against schools since the assault on Columbine High School that can be tied to the 1999 massacre". Ties identified by ABC News included online research by the perpetrators into the Columbine shooting, clipping news coverage and images of Columbine, explicit statements of admiration of Harris and Klebold, such as writings in journals and on social media, in video posts, and in police interviews, timing planned to an anniversary of Columbine, plans to exceed the Columbine victim counts, and other ties.

In 2015, journalist Malcolm Gladwell writing in The New Yorker magazine proposed a threshold model of school shootings in which Harris and Klebold were the triggering actors in "a slow-motion, ever-evolving riot, in which each new participant's action makes sense in reaction to and in combination with those who came before".

FBI former profiler Mary Ellen O'Toole said on CNN during the 20th anniversary of the massacre in 2019, and during the manhunt of Florida teenager Sol Pais, that she opposed the release of the Basement Tapes because of the call made by Eric Harris to other would-be shooters to "join him in infamy". She also highlighted that it was most likely males to be obsessed by the shooting and that the case of Sol Pais was rare due to her being female.

=== Notable cases ===
The first copycat may have been the W. R. Myers High School shooting, just eight days after Columbine, when a 14-year-old Canadian student went into his former school in Taber, Alberta at lunchtime with a sawed off .22 rifle under his dark blue trench coat and opened fire, killing one student. A month after the massacre, Heritage High School in Conyers, Georgia, had a shooting which Attorney General Janet Reno called a Columbine "copycat". A friend of Harris and Klebold, Eric Veik, was arrested after threatening to "finish the job" at Columbine High School in October 1999.

Another case occurred in 2002 in Germany, where a former student, Robert Steinhäuser, sought payback against teachers, possibly for his expulsion, killing 16 people before shooting himself. He had previously researched the Columbine massacre.

Another example is the 2007 Jokela High School massacre in Finland. The perpetrator, Pekka-Eric Auvinen, took significant inspiration from the Columbine perpetrators. During the shooting, he wore a T-shirt reading "Humanity is Overrated" similar to the shirts worn by Klebold and Harris at Columbine. He was also in online chatrooms dedicated to idolizing the Columbine shooters, and made multiple YouTube videos referencing them.

In 2001, Charles Andrew Williams, the perpetrator of the Santana High School shooting, reportedly told his friends that he was going to "pull a Columbine", though none of them took him seriously. In 2005, Jeff Weise, who also wore a trench coat, killed his grandfather, who was a police officer, and his grandfather's girlfriend. He took his grandfather's weapon and squad car, driving to his former high school in Red Lake and murdering several students before killing himself. During the shooting, in an apparent reference to Columbine, he asked one student if they believed in God.

The perpetrator of the 2006 Dawson College shooting wrote a note praising Harris and Klebold. Convicted students Brian Draper and Torey Adamcik of Pocatello High School in Idaho, who murdered their classmate Cassie Jo Stoddart, mentioned Harris and Klebold in their homemade videos, and were reportedly planning a "Columbine-like" shooting. The perpetrator of the 2006 Emsdetten school shooting praised Harris in his diary.

In September 2006, a student at East High School in Green Bay, Wisconsin informed school staff of a plot to carry out a "Columbine Style" attack on the school. A search of the involved students' homes yielded weapons and improvised explosives. Two students served time in prison for conspiracy to commit first-degree intentional homicide. A third student was given a lesser sentence for conspiracy to damage property with explosives.

In a self-made video recording sent to the news media by Seung-Hui Cho prior to his committing the Virginia Tech shootings, he referred to the Columbine massacre as an apparent motivation. In the recording, he wore a backwards baseball cap and referred to Harris and Klebold as "martyrs".

Steven Kazmierczak, the perpetrator of the 2008 Northern Illinois University shooting, referenced fascination about Harris and Klebold, admiring how they planned to use propane bombs to create chaos.

In 2011, Tristan van der Vlis shot and killed six people in a shopping mall in Alphen aan den Rijn in the Netherlands before taking his own life. He was obsessed with the Columbine shootings. The date he chose for his attack was April 9, Eric Harris' birthday, and he started shooting at 12:08 pm, the approximate time that Harris died by suicide.

In June 2014, a married couple, Jerad and Amanda Miller, shot and killed two Las Vegas police officers and an intervening civilian before being confronted by police. Jerad Miller was fatally shot by an officer while Amanda Miller died by suicide shortly afterwards. They both talked about committing "the next Columbine" and idolized Harris and Klebold, according to a neighbor's account.

The Tumblr fandom gained widespread media attention in February 2015 after three of its members conspired to commit a mass shooting at a Halifax mall on Valentine's Day. In 2017, two 15-year-old school boys from Northallerton, England, were charged with conspiracy to murder after becoming infatuated with the crime and "hero-worshipping" Harris and Klebold.

Randy Stair, the perpetrator of the Eaton Township Weis Markets shooting had a fascination with the Columbine High School massacre and Eric Harris and Dylan Klebold. In his writings, Stair called the Columbine shooters his heroes, wishing he could have met them, and said Harris was his idol out of the two boys.

The 2018 Perm school stabbing occurred in Perm, Russia on the morning of January 15, 2018. The perpetrators, 16-year-old former student Lev Bijakov and tenth-grader Alexander Buslidze attacked students and a teacher with knives, after which they attempted suicide. As a result of the attack, 15 people were injured, including the perpetrators. The two teens were said to be inspired by Harris and Klebold. A similar Columbine-inspired copycat attack previously occurred on 5 September 2017 in Ivanteyevka, and later on 19 January in Ulan-Ude, and 18 April in Sterlitamak.

The Kerch Polytechnic College massacre appears to be a copycat crime. The shooter wore a white shirt which said "НЕНАВИСТЬ" ("HATRED" in Russian), one fingerless glove, planted bombs, and died by suicide with a shotgun in the library, all apparent references to the Columbine massacre.

Guilherme Taucci Monteiro and Luiz Henrique de Castro, the perpetrators of the Suzano massacre were inspired by the Columbine High School massacre, and hoped their attack would garner more attention than the Columbine shooting.

On January 10, 2020, an 11-year-old student identified as José Ángel Ramos Betts perpetrated the Colegio Cervantes shooting, killing a teacher and wounding multiple other teachers and classmates shortly before turning the gun on himself. The assailant wore a white T-shirt that read "Natural Selection" and pants with black suspenders, a reference to Eric Harris' outfit.

In September 2021, two teens were arrested in Lee County, Florida, and were accused of plotting a school shooting. A search of the teen's homes found a map of the school with security cameras labeled. Several knives and a gun were also found. The Sheriff Department said that the teens had a "particular interest in Columbine" and that they had been ordered to undergo mental evaluation before charges were filed. Additionally, four teenagers in Pennsylvania were charged after a police investigation found detailed evidence of a plan to target Dunmore High School outside of Scranton, Pennsylvania, on April 20, 2024, the 25th anniversary of the Columbine attack. There were text messages between the students planning the attack, claiming "dibs" on certain potential victims, and stating that they wanted "everything to go down like Columbine".

In August 2022, the perpetrator of the 2022 Bend, Oregon shooting wrote in an online manifesto he was partially influenced by the Columbine massacre.

On April 20, 2026, the 27th anniversary of the Columbine shooting, an 18-year-old student fatally shot herself at Valley Forge High School in Parma Heights, Ohio. Hours before the suicide, she posted images on Instagram of a shrine and a locket containing the pictures of Harris and Klebold.

New discoveries stress the possibility of spread, showing that after a shooting there is an increased danger of more shootings within the first two weeks after, though not all research supports this claim.

One state's school shooting can influence the probability of shootings in schools of nearby states and the same state in the following years, stressing how these incidents are connected. For instance, divorce rate has a significant positive effect on the intensity level of school shooting cases. However, the percentage of minorities shows a negative impact, although not statistically significant. These results highlight the intricate social and economic elements involved, requiring broad-ranging approaches to tackle them successfully.

== In popular culture ==
A video game called Super Columbine Massacre RPG! was based on the massacre. This event also inspired Tom Fulp to create a Flash game, Pico's School, just three months after the massacre, which was released on Newgrounds.

The 2016 biographical film I'm Not Ashamed, based on the journals of Rachel Scott, includes alleged glimpses of Harris's and Klebold's lives and interactions with other students at Columbine High School. The 1999 black comedy, Duck! The Carbine High Massacre is inspired by the Columbine massacre. The 2003 Gus Van Sant film Elephant (which won the Palme d'Or at that year's Cannes Film Festival) depicts a fictional school shooting, but is based in part on the Columbine massacre. The 2003 Ben Coccio film Zero Day was also based on the massacre.

The 2005 Lifetime film Dawn Anna is based on the struggles of Dawn Anna Townsend, whose daughter Lauren was killed in the massacre.

The first documentary on the massacre may have been the TLC documentary Lost Boys in 2000. The 2002 Michael Moore documentary film Bowling for Columbine, which explores the massacre in the context of American gun culture, won several awards including the Academy Award for Best Documentary Feature. Also in 2002, A&E made "Columbine: Understanding Why".

Rapper Eminem references the shooting multiple times throughout his discography. Most famously, "I'm Back" off of The Marshall Mathers LP (2000) contained a line about Columbine that was censored. He references this censorship in "Rap God" (The Marshall Mathers LP 2, 2013) and repeats the line, saying it will not be censored this time because he was not as famous as when "I'm Back" was released. In 2024, he referenced the event once again in his song "Lucifer".

Rapper Tyler, the Creator references the shooting in his song "Yonkers" from his album Goblin. His song "Pigs" from his album Wolf was also inspired by the two shooters.

Fred Durst references the Columbine shooting in the Limp Bizkit song "Head for the Barricade", which is on the 2003 album Results May Vary, and the reference was not censored on the explicit or edited versions of the album.

Indie pop band Foster the People’s 2010 Grammy nominated hit single “Pumped Up Kicks” was partly inspired by the Columbine shooting. The music is cheery and upbeat, but the lyrics are written from the perspective of a teen shooter who tells potential victims they’d “better run, better run, faster than my bullet.” Lead singer Mark Foster was bullied growing up, and wanted a song that explored the increasing connection between youth violence and mental illness. In a review, Jeffery Berg of Frontier Psychiatrist wrote, "I was so engrossed with the cheery melody of its chorus that it took me a few listens to discover that the lyrics suggest dark, Columbine revenge." Bassist Cubbie Fink’s cousin survived the massacre, and Fink supported her during the aftermath. In an interview, Fink said of his cousin's experience: “She was actually in the library when everything went down, so I actually flew out to be with her the day after it happened and experienced the trauma surrounding it and saw how affected she was by it. She is as close as a sister, so obviously, it affected me deeply. So to be able to have a song to create a platform to talk about this stuff has been good for us.”

Commissioned by the Alpha Iota Chapter of Kappa Kappa Psi at the University of Colorado Boulder on behalf of the Columbine High School Band, American composer Frank Ticheli wrote wind ensemble piece "An American Elegy" in memory of those lost in the shooting. Ticheli also composed "Columbine High School Alma Mater", the school's alma mater song.

In 2001, the television series Law & Order released an episode based on the Columbine shooting titled “School Daze." In 2004, the shooting was dramatized in the documentary Zero Hour, narrated by David Morrissey. In 2007, the massacre was documented in an episode of the National Geographic Channel documentary series The Final Report.

The 2009 film April Showers, which was written and directed by Andrew Robinson, who was a senior at Columbine High School during the shooting, was based on Columbine. The 2013 documentary Kids for Cash explores the kids for cash scandal as part of the "zero-tolerance" policy that was popularized in the wake of the Columbine shooting.

Columbine students, Jonathan and Stephen Cohen wrote a song called "Friend of Mine (Columbine)", which briefly received airplay in the US after being performed at a memorial service broadcast on USA-wide television. The song was pressed to CD, with the proceeds benefiting families affected by the massacre, and over 10,000 copies were ordered. Shortly following the release of the CD single, the song was also featured on the Lullaby for Columbine CD.

Since the advent of online social media, a fandom for shooters Harris and Klebold has had a documented presence on social media sites, especially Tumblr. Fans of Harris and Klebold refer to themselves as "Columbiners." An article published in 2015 in the Journal of Transformative Works, a scholarly journal which focuses on the sociology of fandoms, noted that Columbiners were not fundamentally functionally different from more mainstream fandoms. Columbiners create fan art and fan fiction, and have a scholarly interest in the shooting.

In his 1999 comedy special Bigger & Blacker, Chris Rock joked about the Columbine High School shooters, saying “What the hell is wrong with these white kids shooting up the school? They don’t even wait till 3 o’clock either. Killing people in the morning, that ain’t right!”, referencing the perpetrators race and the timing of the attack.

== See also ==
- Christchurch mosque shootings copycat crimes
- True Crime Community
