= Chubbuck, Idaho =

- City
- Chubbuck City Hall

- Logo

- Location of Chubbuck in Bannock County, Idaho.

- Location in the United States
- Coordinates: 42°55′31″N 112°28′50″W
- Country: United States
- State: Idaho
- County: Bannock

Area
  - Total: 5.91 sq mi (15.30 km^{2})
  - Land: 5.90 sq mi (15.28 km^{2})
  - Water: 0.012 sq mi (0.03 km^{2})
- Elevation: 4,469 ft (1,362 m)

Population (2020)
  - Total: 15,570
  - Density: 2,642.3/sq mi (1,020.21/km^{2})
- Time zone: UTC−7 (Mountain (MST))
  - Summer (DST): UTC−6 (MDT)
- ZIP code: 83202
- Area codes: 208, 986
- FIPS code: 16-14680
- GNIS feature ID: 2409460
- U.S. Route: link = U.S. Route 91
- Website: www.cityofchubbuck.us

Chubbuck is a city in Bannock County, Idaho, United States. It is part of the Pocatello metropolitan area. The population was 15,570 at the 2020 census. It is named for Earl Chubbuck (1916–1984), railroad conductor. Chubbuck is located immediately north of Pocatello, Idaho, and has opposed several consolidation proposals since the 1960s.

== Geography ==
According to the United States Census Bureau, the city has a total area of 4.20 square miles (10.88 km^{2}), of which, 4.19 square miles (10.85 km^{2}) is land and 0.01 square miles (0.03 km^{2}) is water.

== Government ==
The mayor of Chubbuck is Rodney T Burch.

== Demographics ==
Historical population
Census	Pop.	Note	%±
1950	120		—
1960	1,590		1,225.0%
1970	2,924		83.9%
1980	7,052		141.2%
1990	7,791		10.5%
2000	9,700		24.5%
2010	13,922		43.5%
2020	15,570		11.8%
2023 (est.)	16,362		5.1%
U.S. Decennial Census

=== 2020 census ===
As of the 2020 census, Chubbuck had a population of 15,570. The median age was 32.9 years. 30.7% of residents were under the age of 18 and 13.9% of residents were 65 years of age or older. For every 100 females there were 96.1 males, and for every 100 females age 18 and over there were 93.7 males age 18 and over.

99.9% of residents lived in urban areas, while 0.1% lived in rural areas.

There were 5,471 households in Chubbuck, of which 40.1% had children under the age of 18 living in them. Of all households, 55.5% were married-couple households, 15.0% were households with a male householder and no spouse or partner present, and 23.3% were households with a female householder and no spouse or partner present. About 23.6% of all households were made up of individuals and 11.0% had someone living alone who was 65 years of age or older.

There were 5,676 housing units, of which 3.6% were vacant. The homeowner vacancy rate was 1.1% and the rental vacancy rate was 5.1%.

Racial composition as of the 2020 census
Race	Number	Percent
White	13,214	84.9%
Black or African American	72	0.5%
American Indian and Alaska Native	404	2.6%
Asian	173	1.1%
Native Hawaiian and Other Pacific Islander	49	0.3%
Some other race	457	2.9%
Two or more races	1,201	7.7%
Hispanic or Latino (of any race)	1,507	9.7%

=== 2010 census ===
As of the census of 2010, there were 13,922 people, 4,732 households, and 3,586 families living in the city. The population density was 3,322.7 inhabitants per square mile (1,282.9/km^{2}). There were 4,961 housing units at an average density of 1,184.0 per square mile (457.1/km^{2}). The racial makeup of the city was 90.5% White, 0.4% African American, 2.4% Native American, 1.1% Asian, 0.3% Pacific Islander, 2.3% from other races, and 3.0% from two or more races. Hispanic or Latino of any race were 7.5% of the population.

There were 4,732 households, of which 44.7% had children under the age of 18 living with them, 60.0% were married couples living together, 11.0% had a female householder with no husband present, 4.8% had a male householder with no wife present, and 24.2% were non-families. 19.9% of all households were made up of individuals, and 8.3% had someone living alone who was 65 years of age or older. The average household size was 2.94 and the average family size was 3.40.

The median age in the city was 30.2 years. 33.5% of residents were under the age of 18; 8.4% were between the ages of 18 and 24; 27.9% were from 25 to 44; 20.3% were from 45 to 64; and 10% were 65 years of age or older. The gender makeup of the city was 48.6% male and 51.4% female.

=== 2000 census ===
As of the census of 2000, there were 9,700 people, 3,190 households, and 2,491 families living in the city. The population density was 2,743.5 inhabitants per square mile (1,059.3/km^{2}). There were 3,377 housing units at an average density of 955.1 per square mile (368.8/km^{2}). The racial makeup of the city was 91.80% White, 0.35% African American, 2.00% Native American, 1.09% Asian, 0.04% Pacific Islander, 2.47% from other races, and 2.24% from two or more races. Hispanic or Latino of any race were 5.38% of the population.

There were 3,190 households, out of which 45.4% had children under the age of 18 living with them, 63.4% were married couples living together, 10.7% had a female householder with no husband present, and 21.9% were non-families. 18.4% of all households were made up of individuals, and 7.2% had someone living alone who was 65 years of age or older. The average household size was 3.02 and the average family size was 3.46.

In the city, the population was spread out, with 33.9% under the age of 18, 10.5% from 18 to 24, 27.6% from 25 to 44, 19.3% from 45 to 64, and 8.7% who were 65 years of age or older. The median age was 29 years. For every 100 females, there were 97.6 males. For every 100 females age 18 and over, there were 93.4 males.

The median income for a household in the city was $41,688, and the median income for a family was $48,138. Males had a median income of $40,726 versus $25,230 for females. The per capita income for the city was $15,936. About 9.1% of families and 12.0% of the population were below the poverty line, including 15.1% of those under age 18 and 6.6% of those age 65 or over.

== Education ==
Chubbuck is a part of the Pocatello/Chubbuck School District. It has two elementary schools within the city limits. Zoned elementary schools serving Chubbuck include Chubbuck Elementary School, Rulon M. Ellis Elementary School, Syringa Elementary School in Pocatello, Wilcox Elementary School in Pocatello, and Tyhee Elementary School in Tyhee.

Residents are zoned to Hawthorne Middle School in Pocatello, Alameda Middle School in Pocatello, and Irving Middle School in Pocatello. Residents are zoned to Pocatello High School and Highland High School both in Pocatello.

== See also ==
- Idaho Central Credit Union
