= Pocatello/Chubbuck School District =

Public school district in Idaho, United States

Pocatello/Chubbuck School District #25

Location
- 3115 Pole Line Road Pocatello, Idaho United States

District information
- Type: Public
- Grades: K-12
- Superintendent: Doug Howell
- Budget: $84.19 million

Students and staff
- Students: 12,799
- Teachers: 624
- Athletic conference: High Country Conference (5A), High Country Conference (4A)

Other information
- Website: www.sd25.us

Pocatello/Chubbuck School District #25 is a public school district in the U.S. state of Idaho, United States. The Pocatello/Chubbuck School District #25 serves the county seat of Pocatello, Chubbuck, and rural areas of Bannock County, Idaho. Bannock County is home to 83,249 residents, according to the United States Census Bureau.

It serves the Bannock County portion of Pocatello, as well as Chubbuck, and unincorporated areas including Tyhee and the Bannock County portion of Fort Hall. Residents of the Idaho State University properties which house university students with dependent children, McIntosh Manor (Building #57), Pulling Courts (Building #53), and Ridge Crest Townhomes (Building #54), are zoned to the school district.

== Schools ==
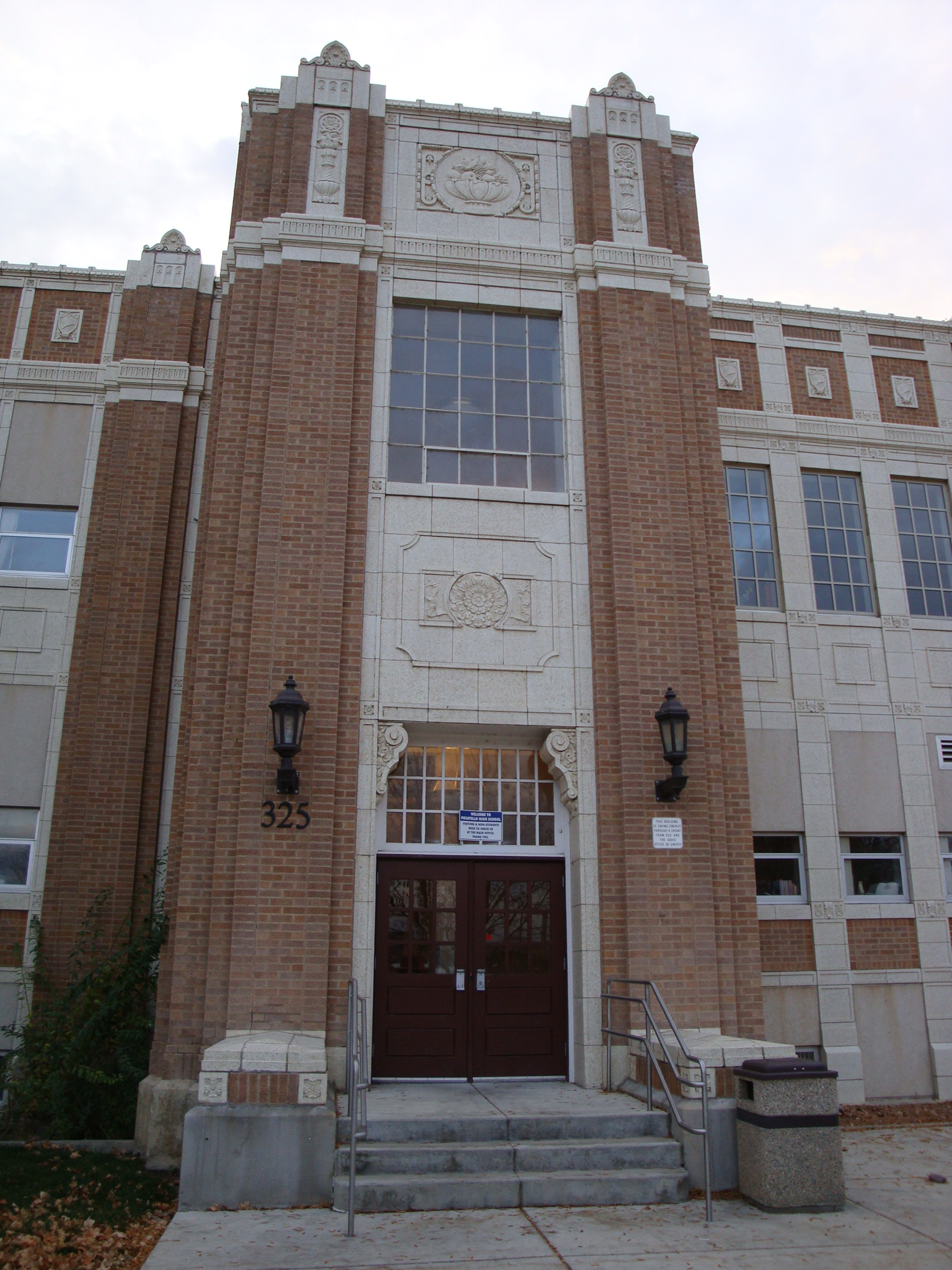
Pocatello High School

=== High schools (9th-12th) ===
- Century High School is a four-year public secondary school, opened in 2000 for grades 9–12 with a current enrollment of 1,198 students. The school mascot is the Diamondback and the school colors are purple, teal, black, and white. The school's athletic teams compete in class 4A, the second-highest classification.
- Highland High School is a four-year secondary public school. Opened in 1963, its current faculty is 72 with an enrollment of 1,465 students in four grades. The school mascot is the Ram and the school colors are black and red. Until the fall of 2002, Highland was a senior high school (grades 10–12); the graduating class of 2006 was the first to graduate after attending all four years at Highland. The school's athletic teams compete in class 5A, the state's highest classification.
- Pocatello High School ("Poky High") is a four-year public secondary school, with a current enrollment of 1140 students. PHS was opened in 1892, and was a senior high school (grades 10–12) until recently. Its mascot is the Thunder and the colors are red, navy blue, and white. The school's athletic teams compete in class 4A, the state's second highest classification.

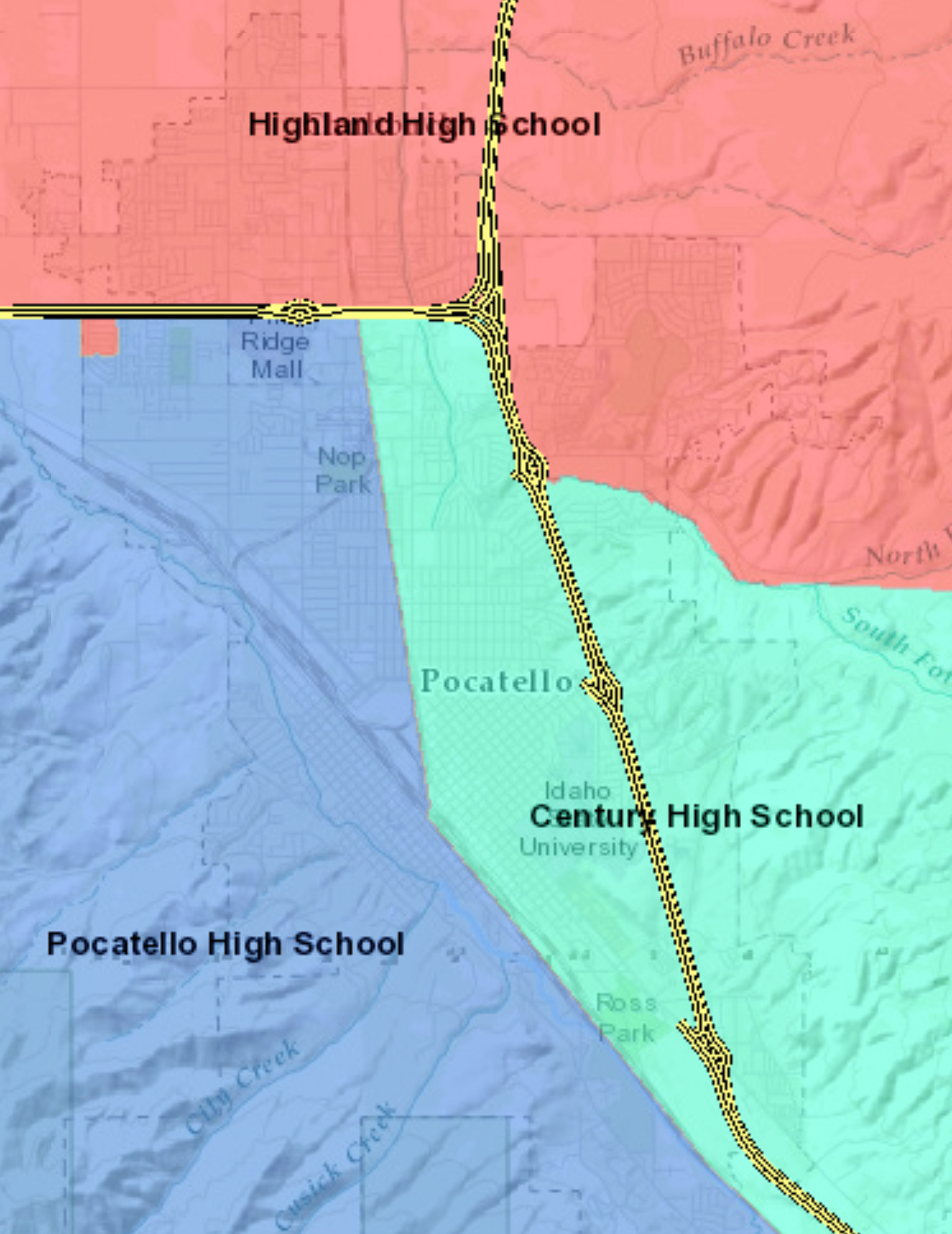
Pocatello/Chubbuck School District #25 High School Boundaries

=== Middle schools (6th-8th) ===
- Alameda Middle School (Opened in 1953)
- Franklin Middle School (Opened in 1924)
- Hawthorne Middle School (Opened in 1957)
- Irving Middle School (Opened in 1925)

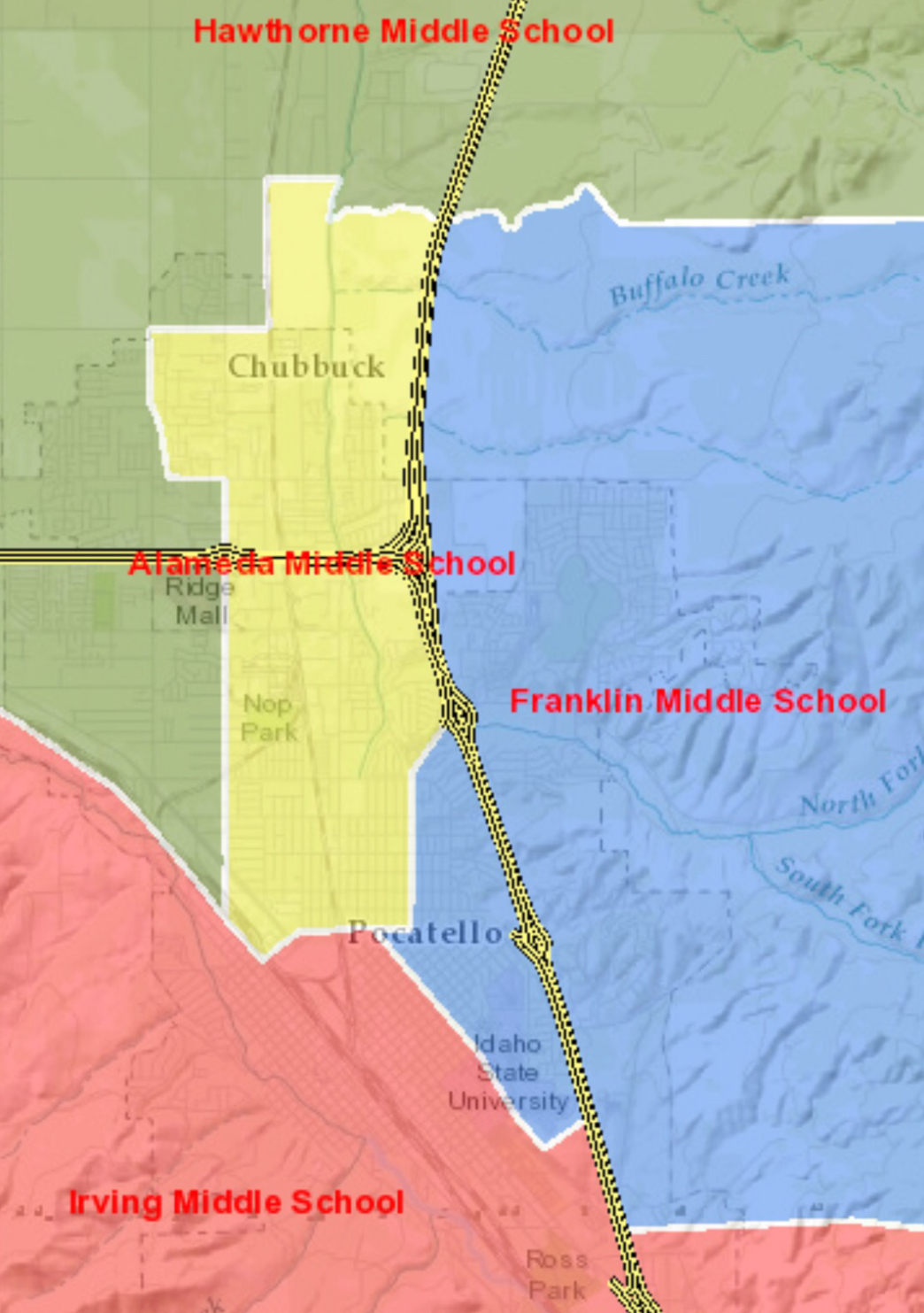
Pocatello/Chubbuck School District #25 Middle School Boundaries

=== Elementary schools (K-5th) ===
- Chubbuck Elementary School (Opened in 1968)
- Edahow Elementary School (Opened in 1982)
- Ellis Elementary School (Opened sometime after 1985)
- Gate City Elementary School (Opened in 1982)
- Greenacres Elementary School (Opened in 1954)
- Indian Hills Elementary School (Opened sometime after 1967)
- Jefferson Elementary School (Opened in 1982)
- Lewis & Clark Elementary School (Opened in 1954)
- Syringa Elementary School (Opened sometime after 1961)
- Tendoy Elementary School (Opened in 1957)
- Tyhee Elementary School (Opened in 1914)
- Wilcox Elementary School (Opened in 1973)

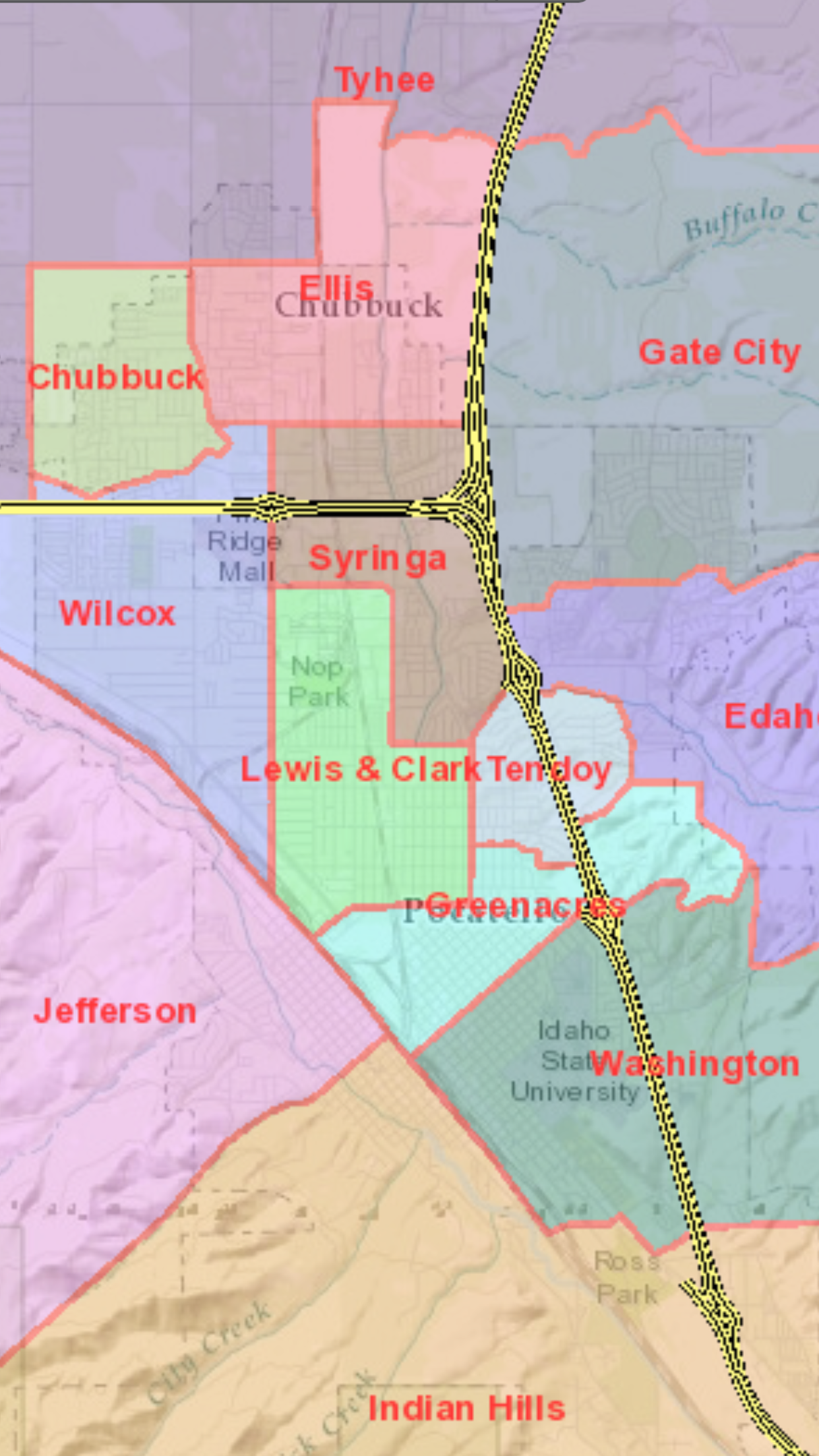
Pocatello/Chubbuck School District #25 Elementary School Boundaries

== Controversy ==
In October 2013, the coach of the Pocatello High School girls basketball team, Laraine Cook, was fired after the Board decided that a photograph of her, and her fiance Tom Harrison (football coach at the same school), was inappropriate. The image was posted on Cook's Facebook page, and showed Harrison with his left hand over Cook's right breast; both were clothed. The image was taken at a Cook family gathering several months earlier. Cook was dismissed on 23 October, several days after the image was supplied to the Board by a person unknown; but, Harrison was reprimanded. Despite the representations of parents of the basketball team to Superintendent Mary Vagner, District 25 Director of Secondary Education Bob Devine, and District 25 Director of Human Resources Douglas Howell, the matter was not cleared up as the team went into important games. In early November 2013, District 25 officials went further, seeking to have Cook's state teaching certificate revoked based on the grounds of immorality, furthering a perception of double standard and that the punishment failed to fit the offense.

Arbitration in the matter led to Cook being rehired in both positions, along with a recommendation that the district develop social media guidelines for employees. The relevant state credentialing agency found no reason to revoke Cook's teaching certificate.

In 2006, Pocatello High School students Brian Draper and Torey Adamcik murdered their classmate Cassie Jo Stoddart, and the victim's family filed a lawsuit against the Pocatello/Chubbuck School District. However, the district did not see the two students as abnormal or a threat to anyone.
