= ICCU =

ICCU is an acronym which may refer to:

- Idaho Central Credit Union, American state-level credit union
- Integrated Charging Control Unit, used in some electric vehicles
- International Cross Country Union, former governing body for cross country running
- Intensive cardiac care unit, specialised medical location focused on heart issues
- Istituto Centrale per il Catalogo Unico, an identifier
