= Murder of Nori Jones =

2004 murder in Pocatello, US

- Location: Pocatello, Idaho, U.S.
- Date: September 28, 2004; 22 years ago
- Attack type: Murder by stabbing
- Deaths: 1
- Victim: Nori Jones
- Perpetrator: Brad Compher
- Motive: Unknown
- Verdict: Guilty
- Convictions: First-degree murder
- Judge: Javier Gabiola

Nori Jones, a 25-year-old woman, was murdered on September 28, 2004 by Brad Compher (b. circa. 1975) in Pocatello, Idaho, United States. Compher was arrested in 2014, approximately 10 years after the murder. He was convicted of first-degree murder by a jury on March 4, 2024.

== Murder ==
On the morning of September 28, 2004, Nori Jones was stabbed to death inside her Pole Line Road home in Pocatello. She had been stabbed/cut more than 20 times, including 17 stab wounds to her torso. Three of those stab wounds to the torso were considered by the pathologist to be possibly fatal because they had penetrated her lungs and heart. The other two wounds that were considered fatal were two large cuts on her neck. She also had numerous defense wounds on her arms and hands, implying a struggle.

== Arrest ==
A man by the name of Brad Compher was arrested on September 10, 2014 and charged for Jones' murder upon DNA at the scene matching him. Pocatello police officers retrieved a cigarette that had been smoked by Compher and brought it in for forensic testing.

He would not be bailed out and thus stayed at Bannock County Jail for the next 10 years.

== Trial ==
The actual trial was delayed for a long time due to questions regarding Compher's mental competency, and the difficulty of finding witnesses for such an old case.

In 2022, the death penalty was taken off the table due to concerns regarding his "mental stability".

The trial started on February 20-23, 2024.

The prosecution revealed there was a "1 in 93 trillion" chance that the DNA found at the scene could belong to someone other than Compher. The wounds found on Jones indicated she had fought back against her assailant. The first two witnesses called to the stand at trial recalled what they encountered after stepping into the house. They spotted a ring they knew belonged to Jones. A friend of Jones explained that the ring symbolized her "promise" to marry her boyfriend one day. She also mentioned that Jones wore it in an effort to deter men from approaching her in public. There were instances of harassment that these key witnesses were aware of, but they had never heard of Compher at any time.

The defense was skeptical that the DNA evidence was sufficient and argued that Compher had no motive to commit the murder. They pushed an alternative theory that there was circumstantial evidence for there to be another suspect. In a questionable move, Compher's defense singled out Brian Draper and Torey Adamcik, the perpetrators of the murder of Cassie Jo Stoddart in September 2006 as possible suspects and had them transported to Pocatello for the trial. Neither Draper nor Adamcik testified and were subsequently returned to the Idaho Department of Correction in Kuna.

After a 10-day trial, and 4 hours of deliberation, the jury convicted Compher of 1st-degree murder on March 4, 2024.

On March 6, 2025, Compher was sentenced to life in prison without parole. The judge reasoned that Compher clearly felt no remorse, meanwhile Compher himself maintained his innocence while angrily telling off everyone in the room.

After being sentenced, he was moved from the Bannock County Jail to the Saguaro Correctional Center.

== See also ==
- Murder of Cassie Jo Stoddart
