= Idaho Central Credit Union =

American state-level credit union

- Type: Credit union
- Industry: Financial services
- Founded: June 28, 1940; 86 years ago
- Headquarters: Chubbuck, Idaho, U.S.
- Number of locations: 66 branches
- Area served: Idaho, Washington, Tucson, and Jackpot, Nevada, Counties in Oregon
- Key people: Brenda Worrell (CEO); Troy Neu (Chairman)
- Services: Savings, Checking, Consumer Loans, Mortgages, Credit cards, Investments, Online banking, Business services
- Total assets: $ 15 billion
- Number of employees: 2,250
- Website: www.iccu.com

Idaho Central Credit Union (ICCU) is a state-chartered credit union in the western United States, headquartered in Chubbuck, Idaho, adjacent to Pocatello. ICCU is the largest credit union in Idaho, with numerous branches serving over 775,000 members with assets over $15 billion; its governing agency is the state's Department of Finance.

== History ==
Idaho Central Credit Union was organized in Boise as a state-chartered credit union on June 28, 1940, to serve the financial needs of the officers of other credit unions operating in the state of Idaho. At that time, officers could not belong to the credit union where they worked.

In 1953, Idaho Central changed its field of membership to include all members of other Idaho credit unions, and in 1972 it was increased again to of small groups approved by the Department of Finance, who had a common bond and desired credit union membership, but were unable to form a credit union. In 1977, it expanded to retail employees in Ada, Bannock, Bingham, and Power counties. Persons in Oneida, Bear Lake, Franklin, Caribou, and Twin Falls counties were added to the field of membership in 1984.

The field of membership expanded in 1989 to include non-durable wholesale, service, and manufacturing for all counties and to persons in Jerome, Gooding, Lincoln, Blaine, Minidoka, and Cassia counties, and Jackpot, Nevada. In 2008, the establishment of the organization's Central's Business Lending Department added member eligibility for businesses. The most change came with the merger of PSCU in north Idaho, adding Shoshone and Kootenai counties.

In 2022, ICCU physically expanded out of Idaho by opening up a branch in downtown Spokane.

In 2025, ICCU expanded their footprint to include Tucson, Arizona and Tri-Cities, Washington.

Idaho Central is the largest credit union in the state of Idaho, with 66 locations in the Treasure Valley, Magic Valley, Eastern Idaho, Idaho Panhandle, Tucson, and Washington.

== Membership ==
ICCU's field of membership includes:

- All employees, employers, students, and retirees of certain industries as defined in the North American Industry Classification System and outlined in Idaho Central Credit Union’s Bylaws who reside in, work in, are headquartered in or paid from any Idaho county.
- Persons in the employ or retirees of the State of Idaho, other public employees within the State of Idaho, or retirees of the same, and members of credit unions located in the State of Idaho.
- Persons employed in any division, subsidiary, or branch of the Micron Corporation and retirees of the same.
- The Idaho Credit Union League, its employees, and its chapters.
- Employees of the Credit Union and credit unions with offices in the State of Idaho.
- Persons who live or work in, or organizations located within the boundaries of a Washington School District.
- Persons who live or work in, or organizations located within Baker, Malheur, Umatilla, Union, and Wallowa Counties, Oregon.
- Persons who reside in, work in, attend school in, or are paid in Jackpot, Nevada.
- Persons who live, work, worship or attend school in the State of Arizona qualified communities defined as Cochise, Pima, Pinal, Greenlee, Graham, Santa Cruz and Yuma Counties.
- Organizations or other legal entities located in the State of Arizona qualified communities defined above.
- Employees and elected officials of the cities and towns in the State of Arizona qualified communities defined above.
- City of Tucson public transit and Airport Authority employees.
- Immediate family members of eligible members of the Credit Union. Immediate family members are defined as a spouse, child, sibling, parent, grandparent, or grandchild. This includes stepparent, step grandparent, stepchildren, stepsibling, adoptive relationships, and persons who are in a relationship in the same residence maintaining a single economic unit.
- Retirees living in the state of Arizona
- Members of the association “Friends of Sabino Canyon” located in the state of Arizona.
- Persons living in the state of Arizona, who are sponsored by an existing member.
- Persons who were members and remain members of this Credit Union at the time this field of membership was approved; small groups that were approved prior to the time this field of membership was approved; persons in the field of membership of credit unions merged into Idaho Central and those credit unions’ fields of membership.
- Family members of eligible members of this Credit Union.

== Governance ==
Idaho Central Credit Union is governed by an elected board of directors. Brenda Worrell serves as the chief executive officer (CEO), Brian Berrett as the chief financial officer (CFO), Brandi Dye as chief information officer (CIO), Ed Tierney as chief lending officer (CLO), Corey Dahle as chief experience officer (CXO), and Michael Watson as chief marketing officer (CMO).

== Sponsorships ==
ICCU is the name sponsor of three sports venues in Idaho.

In 2018, the University of Idaho in Moscow announced that ICCU had acquired the naming rights to a new arena on campus, located north of the west end of the Kibbie Dome, Opened in November 2021, the Idaho Central Credit Union Arena (ICCU Arena) is the home court of the Vandal basketball teams (men's and women's). In September 2020, ICCU announced that it had acquired the naming rights to the former CenturyLink Arena in downtown Boise, which was renamed Idaho Central Arena.

It was announced on January 9, 2024, that ICCU acquired the naming rights for the main stadium at Idaho State University (ISU) in Pocatello, which is now known as the ICCU Dome. Opened 56 years ago in 1970 as the ASISU Minidome, it had been known as Holt Arena since 1988.
