= 2018 Perm school stabbing =

Mass stabbing in Russia

- Location of Motovilikhinsky District in Perm
- Location: school #127, Motovilikhinsky District, Perm, Russia
- Date: 15 January 2018; 10:20 a.m. (YEKT)
- Attack type: Mass stabbing; school violence
- Weapon: Knives
- Deaths: 0
- Injuries: 15 (including both perpetrators)
- Perpetrators: Lev Bijakov; Alexander Buslidze
- Motive: Columbine copycat crime

A school attack in Motovilikhinsky District in Perm, Russia occurred on the morning of 15 January 2018. The perpetrators, 16-year-old students Aleksandr Sergeyevich Buslidze (born 15 May 2001), and Lev Romanovich Bidzhakov (born 2 August 2001), attacked students and a teacher with knives, after which they attempted suicide. As a result of the attack, 15 people were injured, including the perpetrators.

On 18 December 2018, one of the attackers, Lev Bijakov, was sentenced by the Motovilikha District Court of Perm to 9 years and 8 months in prison. His accomplice, Alexander Buslidze, was found insane in September 2018 and sent for compulsory treatment, but was later found sane, and on 29 April 2019, the Motovilikha District Court sentenced him to 7 years in prison. The attack on the Perm school was one of a series of attacks on schools in Russia by copycats of Eric Harris and Dylan Klebold, who committed the Columbine High School massacre on 20 April 1999. A similar incident previously occurred on 5 September 2017 in Ivanteyevka, and later on 19 January in Ulan-Ude, 18 April in Sterlitamak, and May 28, 2019 in Volsk.

== Perpetrators ==
Aleksandr Buslidze and Lev Bidzhakov
- Born: Aleksandr Sergeyevich Buslidze; Russian: Александр Сергеевич Буслизде; May 15, 2001 (age 25) Lev Romanovich Bidzhakov; Russian: Лев Романович Биджаков родился August 2, 2001 (age 25); Perm, Russia (both)

Aleksandr Sergeyevich Buslidze (born 15 May 2001), At the time of the incident, he was a student in grade 10A. He was registered with a neuropsychiatric dispensary due to suicidal tendencies, as he attempted to commit suicide several times during the year. His father, Sergey Buslidze, is a designer. He divorced Aleksandr’s mother and last saw his son when he was in grade 6. After the attack, he refused to help him.

Lev Romanovich Bidzhakov (born 2 August 2001), At the time of the incident, he was studying at a lyceum next to School No. 127. According to his friends, he was an excellent student and a winner of Olympiads. Back in 2012, at the age of 11, Lev beat up other students. After the parents of the victims contacted the police, he was put on the school's internal register. Lev and his father went to psychiatrists, where the teenager was examined and given a certificate stating that he needed separate home education. The Main Directorate of the Ministry of Internal Affairs for the region also reported that one of the attackers (Bidzhakov) was registered with a neuropsychiatric dispensary. He also used drugs. In the summer of 2017, Lev graduated from 9th grade. Another version of what happened emerged: demonstrative revenge against teachers for expulsion from school. Lev was also subscribed to online communities dedicated to the Columbine High School massacre. This became a reason to believe that the teenagers acted together and committed the attack, wanting to imitate Eric Harris and Dylan Klebold. During the court hearing, it became known that a week and a half before the crime, Bijakov was in a psychiatric institution. According to the parents of one of the victims, in December 2017, Lev mixed alcohol with energy drinks, drank it and came to school like that. His behavior was inadequate, which is why doctors were called. The teenager was in a psychiatric institution. After the New Year holidays, his grandfather took him from there, as his parents were on vacation at that time.

== Incident ==
On 15 January 2018, at approximately 10:20 local time, Lev Bijakov and Aleksandr Buslidze entered the school through the turnstile. One used a pass, the other's details were in a journal, which in such cases is given to the teacher. The teenagers, armed with knives, came to room #308 for a labor lesson, where there were students of class 4 "B" aged 10-12 and teacher Natalya Shagulina. The criminals began to stab the teacher and the children. Shagulina defended the children, even managed to push away one of the attackers and received 17 stab wounds, including in the neck. One of the attackers closed the door and did not allow the students to run out of the classroom. After the attack, the criminals attempted suicide by stabbing each other. As a result of the attack, 12 students, the teacher and both attackers were injured. All victims were taken to hospital. Private security guards arrived at the scene 5 minutes after the security guard pressed the panic button.

Initially, information was received that a fight with bladed weapons broke out between high school students. The teacher and students tried to separate them, which resulted in them being injured. It was reported that one of the private security company employees separated the conflicting parties and disarmed one of them. However, this version was later refuted.

In March 2019, during the trial of Buslidze, it was revealed that during the attack, the teenagers stabbed each other not because they were going to commit suicide. One of them began to finish off the wounded, the second decided to stop it, and as a result, they had a disagreement, which is why the attackers cut each other.

Classes at School No. 127 resumed on 17 January 2018.

Natalya Shagulina was in serious condition but soon regained consciousness. She was discharged from City Clinical Hospital No. 4 on 12 February, returned to work in April and was awarded a medal from President Vladimir Putin in October.

== Investigation and trial ==
A criminal case was opened for the attempted murder of two or more persons. The perpetrators were escorted to City Hospital No. 4, where on 17 January the Motovilikha Court of Perm remanded them in custody until 15 March. A few days later they were discharged from the hospital and sent to a pretrial detention center. On 13 March, the arrest was extended for another 2 months. On 5 July, it became known that the attackers were sent to the Butyrka pretrial detention center (pretrial detention center No. 2).

On 12 July 2018, the Motovilikha Court of Perm decided to send Alexander Buslidze to a psychiatric hospital for at least 2 months. On 11 September, it became known that he was declared insane.

On 2 October 2018, it became known that the investigation into the criminal case had been completed.

The trial of Lev Bidzhakov began on 12 October and was held in the Motovilikha Court. The defendant asked to change his measure of restraint from detention to house arrest. On the contrary, Bidzhakov's father asked not to change anything. Thirty people were recognized as victims in the case. The defendant partially admitted his guilt and asked for forgiveness from the victims. On 13 December, the state prosecution asked for 10 years' imprisonment for him. On 18 December 2018, Bidzhakov was sentenced to 9 years and 8 months' imprisonment. On 6 February 2019, the Perm Regional Court upheld the sentence unchanged and rejected the appeal.

The second perpetrator, Buslidze was sent for a second psychiatric examination, which found him sane. In February 2019, it became known that the case against Buslidze had been transferred to court. The trial began on 28 February. On 29 April 2019, Alexander Buslidze was sentenced to 7 years in prison. On 26 June 2019, the Perm Regional Court dismissed the appeal. The hearing was held via video link from the pre-trial detention center where Alexander was being held.

In 2019, Lev Bidzhakov and Aleksandr Buslidze turned 18, and were transferred to adult colonies. In the wake of the mass murder that took place on 11 May 2021, at Gymnasium No. 175 in Kazan ( Republic of Tatarstan ), a source for Vkurse.ru told how the criminals are serving their sentences. Bidzhakov was sent to IK-29 in Perm, and Buslidze to IK-38 in the city of Berezniki.

In February 2020, the victims were given a chance to receive compensation from the parents of the perpetrators: the Buslidze family owes the victims 3.6 million rubles, while the Bidzhakov family owes 4.83 million. Roman Bidzhakov (Lev's father) also had his car confiscated In October, it became known that bailiffs would collect 5,609,000 rubles from the parents of one of the criminals.

Security guard at School No. 127, Yana Galkina, was charged with negligence. The trial began on 6 August 2019. On 1 October 2019, the Motovilikha District Court sentenced her to 2 years of restricted freedom. The Perm Regional Court disagreed with this decision and acquitted her on 28 November 2019. However, the prosecutor's office also appealed this decision. On 31 July 2020, the Motovilikha District Court found Galkina guilty of providing services that did not meet safety requirements, which negligently resulted in causing serious bodily harm and sentenced her to 3 years probation. On 6 October 2020, the Perm Regional Court upheld the verdict.

== Victims ==
The teacher and the two perpetrators were admitted to the hospital in critical condition. Twelve other victims were reported to have been transported to a local children's hospital, and nine children received "superficial injuries".

== Reaction ==
Following the incident in Perm, the Russian Presidential Commissioner for Children's Rights Anna Kuznetsova spoke out:

“This tragedy might not have happened if the signal had been received in time and the specialists had reacted in time. Back in 2012, the situation with one of the young people was so critical that the form of his education was changed. Then there were other alarming signals, but the school simply isolated the child for some time. When the father stopped coping with his son on his own and went to the police, the representatives of the Commission on Juvenile Affairs and the Protection of Children simply decided to hold the father accountable by imposing a fine. The unprofessionalism of the specialists, the lack of communication and continuity in the work of the departments are evident".

Kuznetsova also drew attention to issues of school safety and security.

== See also ==
- 2018 in Russia
- Columbine effect
- List of mass stabbing incidents (2010–2019)
- Kerch Polytechnic College massacre
- 2019 Volsk school attack
- Kuopio school stabbing
