= Century High School (Pocatello, Idaho) =

Public school in Pocatello, Idaho, U.S.

Coordinates: 42.808°N 112.372°W

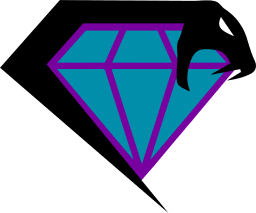
- 7801 Diamondback Drive; Pocatello, Idaho; United States

Information
- Type: Public
- Established: 1999
- School district: Pocatello/Chubbuck School District#25
- Principal: Sheryl Brockett
- Teaching staff: 53.17 (FTE)
- Grades: 9–12
- Enrollment: 1,086 (2023-2024)
- Student to teacher ratio: 20.43
- Colors: Teal, Black, Purple, White, Silver
- Athletics: IHSAA Class 4A
- Athletics conference: Great Basin (East)
- Mascot: Diamondback
- Rivals: Pocatello, Highland
- Newspaper: Snakeskin
- Yearbook: Sojourner
- Elevation: 4,590 ft (1,400 m) AMSL
- Website: century.sd25.us

Century High School is a four-year public secondary school in Pocatello, Idaho, United States. Opened in 1999, it serves the southeast portion of the Pocatello/Chubbuck School District #25, and is the newest of the district's three traditional high schools.

Residents of the Idaho State University properties which house university students with dependent children, McIntosh Manor (Building #57), Pulling Courts (Building #53), and Ridge Crest Townhomes (Building #54), are zoned to Century High School.

== Athletics ==
Century competes in athletics in IHSAA Class 4A, the second-highest classification in the state. It is currently a member of the Great Basin (East) Conference, with Pocatello and Preston. The volleyball team won a third consecutive 4A state title in the fall of 2012. The football team won three state 4A titles in four seasons from 2000–03, as did the girls soccer team (2003–06).

=== State titles ===
Boys

- Football (3): fall (A-1 Division II, now 4A) 2000, (4A) 2001, 2003
- Soccer (1): fall (4A) 2015
- Basketball (2): winter (4A) 2002, 2004

Girls

- Soccer (3): fall (4A) 2003, 2005, 2006
- Volleyball (5): fall (4A) 2010, 2011, 2012 2014, 2015
- Track (1): spring(4A) 2003
- Tennis (3):spring (4A) 2012-2014 -Tennis champions-2013-2014

Combined- Tennis champions - through 2012 (combined team until 2008)

- Tennis (5): 1966, 1969, 2003, 2004, 2005 (introduced in 1963, combined until 2008)

== Students Activities ==
Century competes in athletics in IHSAA Class 4A, the second-highest classification in the state.

=== State titles ===
Drama

- (4A) 2014, 2020, 2021, 2022, 2023
- (5A) 2024

Debate

- Lincoln-Douglas Debate(6): 2005, 2006, 2007, 2008, 2013, and 2014
- Public Forum (1): 2009
- World Schools Debate (1): 2026

Speech

- Original Oratory (1): 2013
- Radio Broadcast Journalism (2): 2013, 2021
- Panel Discussion (2): 2018, 2019
- Program of Oral Interpretation (1): 2019

== V External links ==
- Official website
- Pocatello/Chubbuck School District #25
