= Highland High School (Pocatello, Idaho) =

Coordinates: 42.908°N 112.426°W

- 1800 Bench Road; Pocatello, Idaho 83201; United States

Information
- Type: Public, four-year
- Established: 1963; 63 years ago
- School district: Pocatello/Chubbuck School District#25
- Principal: Brad Wallace
- Teaching staff: 69.68 (FTE)
- Grades: 9–12
- Enrollment: 1,539 (2023-2024)
- Student to teacher ratio: 22.09
- Colors: Black, White, & Red
- Athletics: IHSAA Class 5A
- Athletics conference: High Country (5A)
- Mascot: Ram
- Rivals: Pocatello, Century
- Yearbook: Highlander
- Website: highlandrams.org//

Highland High School is a four-year public secondary school in Pocatello, Idaho, part of the Pocatello/Chubbuck School District#25. The school colors are red, black, and white and its mascot is a ram.

== History ==
Opened 63 years ago in 1963, Highland was the second of the three traditional public high schools in Pocatello, and serves the northern portion of the school district, including portions of Pocatello, Chubbuck, and Tyhee. It was originally going to be called "Gate City", one of Pocatello's historical nicknames. Students voiced their dislike for the name and a vote was held, and the winning name was "Highland". The campus is in an elevated area on Bench Road, northeast of the city center; the elevation is 4,740 ft (1,445 m) above sea level, about 270 feet (80 m) above rival Pocatello High.

There is another Highland High School in the state, at Craigmont in Lewis County in north central Idaho. A small school in Class 1A, it is usually distinguished by the name Highland-Craigmont to avoid confusion.

A catastrophic fire started at the school around 4 am on April 21, 2023; the extent and cause of the fire were not immediately known. The fire was fairly contained around the cafeteria area. A single building on the campus which housed the gymnasium, cafeteria, band, and choir rooms was deemed a total loss. Investigation later revealed that the fire originated near the north wall of the stage in the cafeteria, and as stated by Pocatello Fire Chief Ryan O'Hearn, the cause of the fire was "electrical in nature due to faulty equipment, and the fire was definitely ruled as accidental in nature."

== Traditions ==
Since its founding, Highland has been the rival of Pocatello High. The "Black and Blue Bowl", the annual rivalry football game, received national attention across the years, most recently being named the best rivalry game in the state of Idaho in 2009 by ESPN. The rivalry's intensity was expectedly diminished with the addition of the city's third high school, Century, which opened 27 years ago in 1999.

Highland has three fight songs and the official one is the "Highland High School Fight Song." The more commonly sung fight song is called "Loyalty," the lyrics to which are printed on the back of student activity cards. The last is called "Ram Power," .

== Athletics ==
Highland competes in athletics in IHSAA Class 5A, with the largest schools in the state. It is currently a member of the High Country Conference (5A), with Idaho Falls, Skyline, Hillcrest, and Madison. Intra-city rivals Pocatello and Century are in Class 4A; Pocatello was in the top classification until the arrival of Century in 1999. Highland's enrollment in 2011 was among the lowest in 5A. In its early years, Highland was a member of the Southern Idaho Conference, which spanned from Caldwell in the west to Idaho Falls in the east (the current SIC is limited to southwest Idaho, in both 5A and 4A).

Over its history, the Highland football program has been one of the best in the state and last won the 5A state championship in 2014. The Rams have won a total of ten official state championships, the first in 1984. Prior to the introduction of the A-1 (now 5A) playoffs in 1979, Highland won three unofficial state titles in the writers' poll, in 1972, 1973, and 1976, and were runners-up twice, in 1970 and 1975, behind only undefeated Borah of Boise both years.

The boys' cross country team won nine state titles in ten years from 1981–90, with streaks of five and four consecutive titles.

=== State titles ===
Boys

- Football (12): fall 1984, 1987, 1993, 1995, 1997, 1998, 1999, 2002, 2008, 2014, 2017, 2023 (official with introduction of playoffs, fall 1979)
  - (unofficial poll titles - 3) - fall 1972, 1973, 1976 (poll introduced in 1963, through 1978)
- Cross Country (9): fall 1981, 1982, 1983, 1984, 1985, 1987, 1988, 1989, 1990
- Basketball (4): 1970, 1981, 1990, 1996, 2016
- Track (2): 1994, 1995
- Golf (3): 1979, 1982, 2009

Girls

- Cross Country (1): fall 1983 (introduced in 1974)
- Volleyball (1): fall 1997(introduced in 1976)
- Basketball (3): 1985, 1986, 1987 (introduced in 1976)
- Track (2): 1989, 1990 (introduced in 1971)

== National honors ==
=== Cross-country ===
Highland High School was awarded the 1984 National Cross Country Championship through the XC Legacy series published through Milesplit.us in an effort to begin filling in the national rankings from 1980 to 1988. This was the first national championship in cross country for coach Bob Conley, who also earned nine state championships in a 10-year stretch (1981–1990). On Bob Conley: "He stands at the top of the list, as the greatest cross country coach in Idaho prep history". Of the 1984 team: "Let it be known as well that the first national championship cross country program out of Idaho came from Pocatello."

=== Marching band ===
The school band was invited to Florida to play in the BCS Championship game halftime show in January 2009. In 2019, Highland's marching band show Order and Chaos won every competition it entered.

== Student activities ==
Highland has over 40 student organizations. School-funded sports teams at Highland include: football, boys and girls soccer, boys and girls basketball, girls volleyball, wrestling, baseball, softball, golf, tennis, cross country, track, debate and the marching band.

== Notable alumni ==
- Chris Abernathy: union electrician and member of the Idaho House of Representatives
- Wil Carter (2006): professional basketball player for EiffelTowers of the Dutch Basketball League since 2012
- Merril Hoge (1983): NFL running back for Pittsburgh Steelers (1987–93) and Chicago Bears (1994); college football at Idaho State
- Taysom Hill (2009): NFL back for New Orleans Saints; starting quarterback at BYU (2013, 2014, 2016)
- Bryan Johnson (1996): NFL running back (2000–2006), played at Boise State
- Dirk Koetter (1977): head football coach at Boise State (1998–2000), Arizona State (2001–06), and NFL's Tampa Bay Buccaneers (2016–18)
- Steve Kragthorpe (1983): head football coach at Tulsa (2003–2006) and Louisville (2007–2009)
- Fred S. Martin (1968): member of the Idaho State Senate since 2012
- Tristen Hoge (2015): football player for New York Jets, played at BYU from 2017 to 2020.
- Shay Carl (1998): YouTube personality, co-founder of Maker Studios.
- Tommy Togiai (2018): football player for Houston Texans, played at Ohio State from 2018-2020.

== Notable faculty ==
- Edgar J. Malepeai: taught U.S. government at Highland before becoming Idaho State Senator for the 30th district and minority leader
