= 2019 Volsk school attack =

2019 crime in Volsk, Russia

Coordinates: 52.05335°N 47.45538°E

- Location: Bolshevik Village, Volsk, Russia
- Date: May 28, 2019; 7 years ago
- Attack type: Stabbing, school violence, arson, copycat crime
- Weapons: Hatchet; Molotov cocktail Ice pick (allegedly)
- Deaths: 0
- Injuries: 1
- Perpetrator: Daniil Pulkin
- Motive: Revenge for bullying; Notoriety; Kerch Polytechnic College massacre copycat crime

The 2019 Volsk school attack occurred in the village of Bolshevik in Volsk, Russia on the morning of 28 May 2019. 15-year-old seventh-grader Daniil Pulkin threw two Molotov cocktails and hit a 12-year-old girl on the head with an axe, after which he fled the scene of the crime. The attacker was detained the same day.

Pulkin cited Vladislav Roslyakov, the perpetrator of the Kerch Polytechnic College massacre as his inspiration and on the day of his attack he showed up wearing a black t-shirt with the word "разочарование" (which translates to "disappointment") in red, a reference to Roslyakov's "Hatred" t-shirt. On 4 August 2020, the Volsky District Court sentenced Pulkin to seven years in prison. The incident was one of several cases of student attacks on schools in Russia. Similar incidents occurred before this: on 5 September 2017, in Ivanteyevka, on 15 January 2018 in Perm, on 19 January of the same year in Ulan-Ude, and on 18 April in Sterlitamak.

== Perpetrator ==
Daniil Pulkin before the attack

Daniil Pulkin (Russian: Даниил Пулькин) was born in 2004. At the time of the incident, he was 15 years old and a 7th-grader at School No. 4 in the village of Bolshevik in Volsk. Several years before the attack, Daniil's father died in a fire. He was raised by his mother and grandmother. He had no friends at school, but he was not called a conflict-prone person - just a loner. One of the residents of the village of Bolshevik said that Daniil behaved badly and could be rude to anyone. Classmates said that Pulkin went to a shooting club and was kind and sympathetic. Since 2017, he has been registered with a psychiatrist and was homeschooled due to inappropriate behavior. He was held back a year once. At the beginning of the school year, Pulkin was transferred to another class. According to teachers, he had a rather difficult character. He did not like the new class and wanted to return to the old one. A student from class 7A said that Daniil, together with his friend Dmitry (Pulkin mentioned him in a video message recorded before the attack), repeatedly insulted her. After transferring to class B, he stopped doing this.

In March 2019, Pulkin was in a psychiatric hospital. According to the attending psychiatrist, he was a poor student, insulted teachers and relatives, fond of shooting sports, and expressed thoughts of suicide. "He knows how to manipulate people, has a well-developed speech. He achieves his goals by any means, even by blackmail. He has no bad habits. He has a bad attitude towards interference in 'his world'. His mother works constantly, she has no time - this irritates him. Upon admission in February, he was diagnosed with external behavioral and emotional disorder", the description says.

Several months before the attack, Pulkin became interested in the subject of the Columbine High School massacre. In particular, this happened after the massacre at the Kerch Polytechnic College. On 2 May, on Vladislav Roslyakov's birthday, the teenager posted a photo of his idol on his VKontakte page and wrote: "You inspired thousands of boys across the country. Happy 19th birthday to you!".

On the eve of the attack, Pulkin published a manifesto on his VKontakte page, in which he explained what happened as "suicidal thoughts and a desire for revenge, a desire to become famous to people".

End of the manifesto:

"…It’s not just my mother who is to blame for this, but society as a whole. Don’t blame only my family, EVERYONE is to blame for this!."

Later he stated:

"So, the reason for everything is DISAPPOINTMENT, just as I am a disappointment for people, so for me people are a disappointment..."

Relatives noticed a few days before the incident that Daniil was carrying an ice pick, but thought it was a toy. Before the attack on the school, the teenager complained to his uncle about his peers and teachers. He replied that such people should be burned. The boy took this seriously. The police wanted to charge the uncle with incitement to crime, but they could not, because he simply expressed his opinion.

== Attack ==
On the morning of 28 May 2019, Daniil Pulkin came to School No. 4. He was carrying two Molotov cocktails and an axe in his backpack. There was no security at the school. Before the attack, the teenager recorded a video message :

“I'm at school. I'm very scared, but I have to do it. Whatever they think of me, whatever happens. I hope Dmitry survives, he's my friend. I hope everything goes well. Good luck to everyone.”

The teenager went up to the second floor of the school and went to the room where the 7th "A" class was writing a midterm assessment in mathematics. Pulkin threw a Molotov cocktail into the class, but it did not catch fire. A teacher looked out of the next room at the noise, Pulkin threw another bottle with a Molotov mixture at her, but there was no fire. In the corridor, Pulkin saw 12-year-old 6th grade student Daria Kozlova (born 2007) and hit her on the head with an axe. After the blow, he noticed the girl, but did not run after her, dropped the weapon and ran to the exit. Some sources indicate that Pulkin used an ice pick during the attack.

The attacker fled the scene of the crime. On his way home, he recorded another video message in which he regretted what he had done and repented:

“I’m walking home from school. I couldn’t do it. I wounded a girl, I don’t even know her name. Now I want to commit suicide. I’m really scared, I really regret what I did. I’m not like that. I don’t know what came over me. The Molotov didn’t catch fire. I failed, I fucking failed. I couldn’t do it. I saw them running, their faces. It’s hard for me: killing a human being. I wounded a girl right in the head. I’m so sorry! I want to offer my deepest apologies.”

After the attack, the teenager sent audio messages to his friends: "I thought that killing a person was very easy: just hit and that's it. Yes, that's true, just hit and nothing more. But it's very hard to bear." Pulkin claimed that he was going to commit suicide back in school, but couldn't. He tried again when he got home.

Returning home, the teenager looked at everything written about him and the incident on the Internet. He was arrested an hour after the incident. The police found him right at his computer.

Darya Kozlova, who was injured in the attack, was hospitalized with a severe head injury in a moderate condition. On the same day, on the instructions of the Governor of the Saratov Region, Valery Radayev, she was urgently flown to Saratov. According to the regional Ministry of Health on 11 June, the girl's condition was assessed as moderate but stable. As a result of the injury, the girl lost sight in one eye.

== Investigation and trial ==
A criminal case was opened under Part 3 of Article 30 - paragraphs "a, b, e, j" of Part 2 of Article 105 of the Criminal Code of the Russian Federation (attempted murder of two or more persons, committed in a generally dangerous way, with particular cruelty, with a rowdy motive).

The emergency at the Volsk school was taken under personal control by the regional children's rights commissioner Tatyana Zagorodnyaya. She met with Pulkin in the pretrial detention center. According to her, he asked about the condition of the injured girl. He burst into tears when he learned that she had gone blind in one eye.

Daniil's mother said: "I was present at all the investigative actions. Daniil voluntarily tells about everything that happened. He is now very remorseful!"

On 29 May, Pulkin was taken to the Volsky District Court to choose a preventive measure. “I didn’t want to kill anyone, I wanted to scare them and draw their attention to the fact that schoolchildren drink and lead an immoral lifestyle,” the teenager was quoted as saying. The offender was remanded in custody for 2 months (until 28 July). On 23 July the arrest was extended until 28 September, on 24 September — until 28 November, and on 25 November — until 27 January 2020. A total of 21 people were recognized as victims in the case: the victim Daria Kozlova, the students who were in the classroom, and the teacher.

On 30 December 2019, it became known that the case had been referred to court.

The trial began on 23 January 2020. Pulkin was remanded in custody until 29 June. On 22 June, the term was extended until 29 September. The mother of Daria Kozlova filed a claim for moral damages in the amount of one million rubles and 130 thousand for expenses. At the hearing on 21 July, Daniil made his final statement: the teenager admitted guilt with the exception of hooligan motives, asked for forgiveness from Daria, asked to leave him free and assign a suspended sentence, said that while in the pre-trial detention center, he understood a lot and became a different person. He spoke with a trembling voice. On 31 July, the prosecution requested 7 years of imprisonment for Pulkin.

On 4 August 2020, the Volsky District Court sentenced Daniil Pulkin to 7 years of imprisonment in a correctional colony. In addition, the court ordered compensation of one million rubles to be paid to Daria's family. The defense and the prosecutor's office filed an appeal against the verdict. However, on 21 October 2020, the Saratov Regional Court upheld the verdict unchanged.

On 12 September 2025, Daniil Pulkin was released from prison after serving his sentence.

== See also ==
- Kerch Polytechnic College massacre – school shooting perpetrated by Vladislav Roslyakov, by whom Pulkin was inspired.
- Copycat crime
- 2019 in Russia
