= 2017 Ivanteyevka school attack =

School attack in Ivanteyevka, Russia

Coordinates: 55°57′57.3″N 37°55′02.1″E

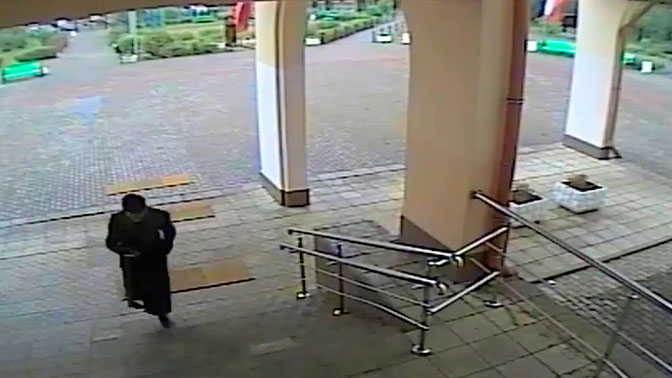
- Pivnev caught on the surveillance camera entering the school building.
- Location: Ivanteyevka, Moscow Oblast, Russia
- Date: September 5, 2017 (10:00 MSK, UTC+3)
- Attack type: School attack; school violence; bombing; copycat crime; attempted mass murder; school stabbing
- Weapons: Air rifle; Cleaver; Improvised explosive devices
- Deaths: 0
- Injuries: 4 (1 directly; 3 indirectly)
- Perpetrator: Mikhail Pivnev
- Motive: Columbine copycat crime

The 2017 Ivanteyevka school attack was an armed attack that occurred at school in Ivanteyevka, Moscow Oblast, Russia, on the morning of September 5, 2017. When ninth-grader Mikhail Pivnev entered the building of "Educational Center No. 1", where he was a student and opened fire from an air rifle, and then detonated homemade explosive devices. (Note: A number of sources, including the press service of the Investigative Committee of the Russian Federation, noted that the attacker used homemade explosive devices made from firecrackers. A source in law enforcement agencies told the TASS news agency that the "Ivanteyevka shooter" "started detonating explosive packages" during the attack. According to information from the press service of the Main Directorate of the Ministry of Internal Affairs of Russia for the Moscow Region, the attacker "scattered smoke bombs in the classroom". Sergei Chuklov, head of the security department of the Ivanteyevka administration, noted in an interview with the newspaper "Puls Ivanteyevka" that during the incident "either an explosive package or some other pyrotechnics were detonated") As a result of the attack, four people were injured: an IT teacher, whom the teenager hit in the head with a cleaver and shot in the face, as well as three school students who jumped out of the window of the educational institution.

Pivnev was detained by law enforcement officers. A psychological and psychiatric examination established the teenager's sanity at the time of the attack. On February 15, 2019, the Ivanteevsky City Court of the Moscow Region, having found the "Ivanteevsky shooter" guilty of attempted murder of two or more persons and hooliganism, sentenced him to 7 years and 3 months of imprisonment in a correctional colony, and also imposed an additional penalty in the form of a fine of 20 thousand rubles. Among other things, the court satisfied the victims' claims for compensation for material and moral damages in the total amount of more than 2 million rubles.

The Ivanteyevka incident was the first time in Russian history that an attack on an educational institution was carried out by a copycat of Eric Harris and Dylan Klebold, the perpetrators of the Columbine High School massacre on April 20, 1999. The incident, as well as the fact that the attacker was inspired by the actions of American mass murderers, caused a wide public outcry and led to the emergence of a number of legislative initiatives: in particular, a federal law was passed banning “Columbine communities” on social networks and other Internet resources that incite children to commit suicide and commit crimes. Similar incidents would follow: on 19 January in Ulan-Ude, 18 April in Sterlitamak, on 15 January 2018 in Perm, on 19 January of the same year in Ulan-Ude, on 18 April in Sterlitamak. And May 28, 2019 in Volsk.

== Perpetrator ==
Mikhail Sergeyevich Pivnev was born in 2002, at the time of the attack he was 15 years old and was a 9th "A" grade student at the municipal budgetary educational institution "Educational Center No. 1" in Ivanteyevka. According to media reports, Mikhail's father, Sergey Pivnev, was a major local entrepreneur, the founder of the company "Geosistema", specializing in services in the field of geodesy, his mother was an employee of the Ivanteyevka MFC; Mikhail was not the only child in the family - the Pivnevs also raised a daughter, who, like her older brother, studied at "Educational Center No. 1". The Pivnev family, according to law enforcement agencies, was prosperous, and the teenager himself, according to the children's ombudsman of the Moscow region, Ksenia Mishonova, had no problems with the police. An acquaintance of Pivnev's called his parents very strict: "No one I know had parents who kept such an eye on them as they did on him. He was not allowed to stay out late: he had to be home by eight in the evening. His mother was constantly calling him".

Conflicting information was published in the media regarding Pivnev's character and the young man's relationships with his classmates. The RIA Novosti news agency reported that Mikhail was described at school as a strange and withdrawn person. Some students at Educational Center No. 1 and their parents claimed that the teenager was bullied by his classmates, and that the school administration did not take any action to combat the bullying. In an interview with RT, one of the students at Educational Center No. 1 reported that Pivnev was “a very withdrawn guy”. A schoolboy named Ivan, who, according to RIA Novosti, knew Pivnev and studied in a parallel class, on the contrary, claimed that the shooter was not withdrawn, had friends and “nothing foreshadowed” the incident. The fact that Mikhail “was not an outcast” and stood out among other schoolchildren only by his style of clothing was reported, citing another student in a parallel class, by the publication “ Vesti.ru ”. “There was no signal, there were no complaints from the children to the teachers that something terrible was being prepared. "The boy did not show any signs of aggression. He never violated discipline, he was calm. “The relationship with the children was absolutely smooth,” noted the acting director of Ivanteyevka School No. 1, Natalya Reshetova, separately emphasizing that the student communicated with a psychologist “after a deterioration in his academic performance and behavior was recorded”.

Pivnev was actively interested in weapons. As Ksenia Mishonova noted, knowing about their son's hobby, Mikhail's parents themselves gave him an air gun, which the teenager later used in an attack on a school. An acquaintance of Pivnev's told RT that the schoolboy made homemade weapons, and sometimes went out into the street with his air rifle. Pivnev also showed interest in the topic of mass murders in educational institutions. On the social network VKontakte, he was registered as Mike Klebold; The nickname chosen by the young man referred to the surname of Dylan Klebold who committed the mass murder at Columbine High School in April 1999. On his page, Mikhail posted personal photos, including with weapons. On April 20, 2017, on another anniversary of the events at Columbine, he wrote: “If we don't go into details, then as a result 13 students are dead. Here it is again that very day". "It doesn't matter what is happening around, how they treat me, I wonder if I am needed here... life is beautiful, friends, but sometimes death is better. And maybe it would be better if I were in Eric's or Dylan's place... Now forget everything that is written here and move on with your life. Not everyone likes suicidal thoughts, right?”. Pivnev also imitated the Columbine shooters in his appearance: he wore a long raincoat, combat boots, and a military-style bag; a schoolboy friend said that Mikhail's style of clothing was not to the liking of teachers. In particular, according to her, teachers forced the teenager to take off his combat boots at school, and Pivnev only came to school in a raincoat once—on the day of the attack.

Both his acquaintances and classmates knew that Pivnev was planning an attack on the school. In an interview with the online publication Meduza, two former students of Educational Center No. 1 said that the teenager openly announced his desire, like Eric Harris and Dylan Klebold, to attack the educational institution. Among the reasons that prompted Mikhail to decide to commit the attack, in particular, were the conflictual relationships that developed between him and several classmates, as well as the computer science teacher - the student was ridiculed because of his appearance. Ombudsman Ksenia Mishonova claimed that students from grade 9A who studied with Pivnev reported their classmate's plans to the school administration, but this warning was not taken seriously.

== Attacks ==
On the evening of September 4, 2017, one of Pivnev's acquaintances named Maria met the teenager at his home. Mikhail, who at that moment had a case with "something resembling a gun" on him, told his friend that he was going to "organize a terrorist attack" the next day, but the girl did not take these words seriously - she knew about the teenager's long-standing fascination with the topic of "Columbine" and mass murders in educational institutions.

On the morning of September 5, Mikhail prepared for the attack: he packed a bag with a kitchen hatchet and homemade explosive devices, set the status “delete my life 09/05/17” on his VKontakte page, and, armed with an air rifle, headed to school. At 7:51 Moscow time, the teenager sent a message to Maria, saying that he had not joked about the terrorist attack the night before.

Pivnev entered the building of Educational Center No. 1 at around 10 a.m., after the start of the third lesson. The young man carried the air rifle under his coat: as Meduza reported, citing the mother of two students at the school, the security guards at the entrance almost never searched the students. At the designated time, Mikhail's class of 9A was having a computer science lesson - some of the students were in a room on the second floor, and others were on the fourth; Pivnev, having previously asked his sister to leave the school as quickly as possible, proceeded to a room on the second floor, where 39-year-old Lyubov Kalmykova was teaching at the time. Upon entering the classroom, Mikhail got into a verbal altercation with Kalmykova, who reprimanded the student for his tardiness and appearance, and then escorted him out of the classroom. Some time later, the students heard the sound of a gunshot and the teacher's screams coming from the hallway: Pivnev hit Kalmykova on the head with a cleaver and shot her in the face with an air rifle; the teacher was subsequently hospitalized with a traumatic brain injury and underwent surgery.

After the attack on the teacher, Pivnev returned to class. Mikhail's classmates barricaded themselves in a utility room of the classroom, and the shooter himself, as a source of the TASS agency in law enforcement agencies reported, at that time shouted threats and began to detonate explosive packages; according to eyewitnesses, Pivnev also shouted that he had been waiting for the attack for three years and "came to die". Three students (two girls and one boy), fearing for their lives, jumped out of a second-floor window, resulting in fractures and bruises; later, the injured schoolchildren were also hospitalized.

Pivnev, who was heading to the fourth floor of the school, where the second half of class 9A was having a lesson, was detained by police and Rosgvardia officers who arrived at the scene. A video recording showing two law enforcement officers in full gear and helmets leading the shooter in a light T-shirt with his hands behind his back out of the school building was published by an eyewitness on Instagram.

By the time the shooter was detained, about 300 people had been evacuated from the school building. According to NTV, the first reports of the attack appeared in the media at 10:18 Moscow time, and according to TJ, at approximately 11:00. The head of Ivanteyevka, Elena Kovaleva, stated that what happened was not a terrorist attack, and that the events at the school were the result of the actions of a student who had a conflict with a teacher. The head of the security department of the Ivanteyevka administration, Sergei Chuklov, called the attack a domestic conflict.

== Investigation ==
The study was conducted inpatient at the V. P. Serbsky State Scientific Center for Social and Forensic Psychiatry. The examination established that at the time of the attack, the young man was sane and understood the nature of his actions.

On July 27, 2018, it became known that the investigative actions in the criminal case of the attack were completed, and the defense began to familiarize itself with the case materials, which amounted to about six volumes. According to Pivnev's lawyer, the young man filed a motion for joint and separate familiarization with the case with the defense attorney and legal representative.

== Trial ==
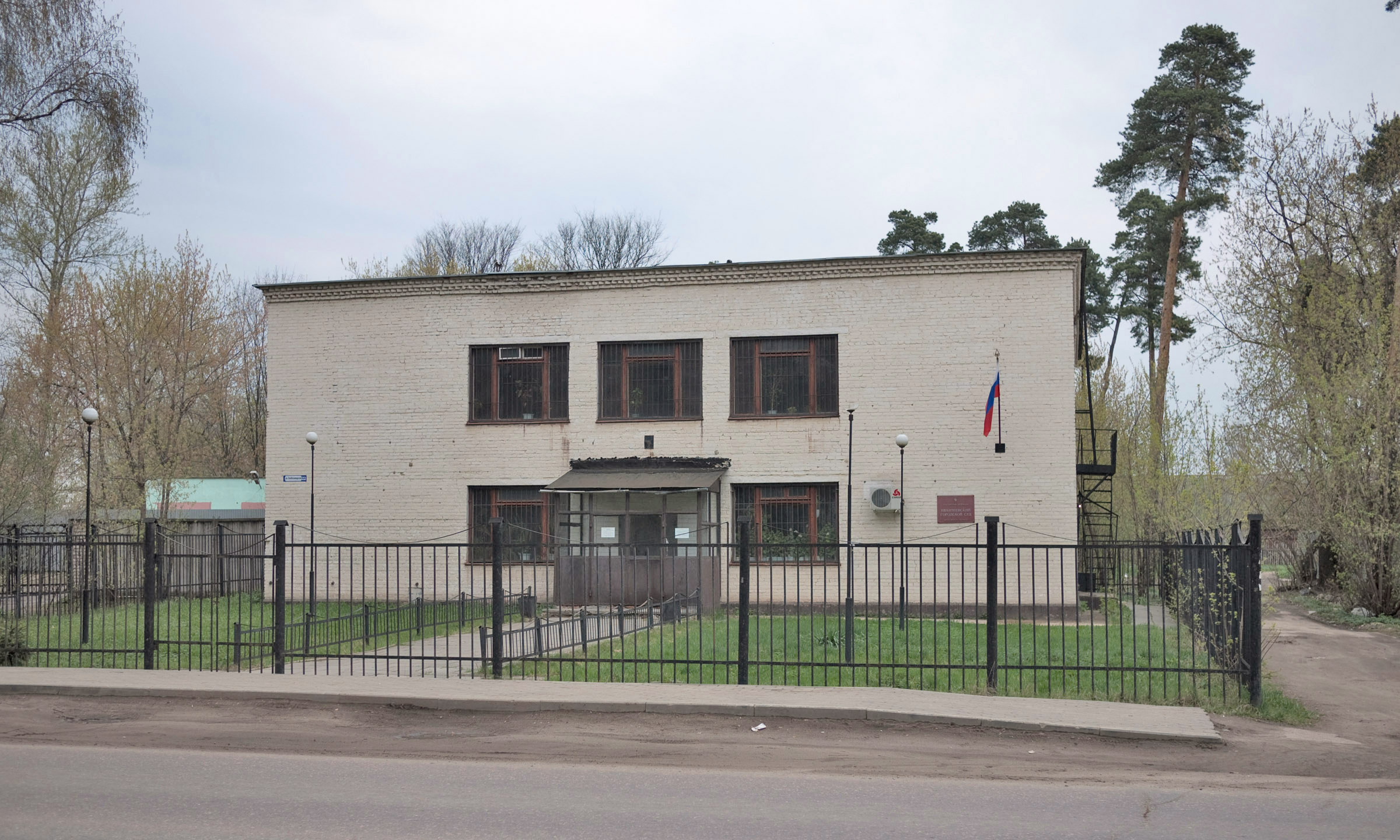
Ivanteyevka court building

Pivnev's trial began on November 28, 2018, in the Ivanteevsky City Court of the Moscow Region. Mikhail Pivnev's defense petitioned for the trial to be held behind closed doors, and this petition was granted. At the first hearing, the state prosecutor read out the indictment, after which the defendant partially admitted guilt, stating that he did not plead guilty to attempted murder.

During the consideration of the case, the victims and witnesses in the case were questioned, and various pieces of evidence were examined. “Dozens of victims are coming to the hearings on the case. It is expected that they will not only give testimony, but also file civil claims for compensation for moral and physical harm,” noted the RIA Novosti agency, which called the trial of the “Ivanteyevka shooter” one of the most anticipated trials of 2019.

At the debate stage, the state prosecution requested that Pivnev be sentenced to 9 years and 6 months of imprisonment, to be served in a correctional colony. Kommersant emphasized, "according to Russian law, an accused under 18 cannot be sentenced to more than ten years; in other words, the state prosecution requested practically the maximum sentence for the teenager".

During the debate, the defense insisted on leniency for Pivnev and a suspended sentence. As noted by the publication Kommersant, Pivnev's defense attorney Viktor Zaprudsky drew the court's attention to the fact that the defendant did not intend to kill anyone and partially admitted guilt. The teenager's lawyer also argued that Pivnev's actions should be seen as evidence of crimes such as threatening to kill and causing moderate bodily harm, thus challenging "the correctness of imputing attempted murder". "He poses no danger to society," Zaprudsky stated, while emphasizing that during his time in the pretrial detention center, his client came to understand what had happened. On February 14, Pivnev made his final statement in court.

On February 15, 2019, the court handed down a guilty verdict against Pivnev: the teenager was sentenced to imprisonment for 7 years and 3 months, to be served in a correctional colony. "He was found guilty under two articles of the Russian Criminal Code: attempted murder of two or more persons committed in a generally dangerous manner, hooliganism with the use of explosives," Anna Tyurina, press secretary of the Moscow Regional Court, told the Russian Agency for Legal and Judicial Information . The victims' claims for compensation for material and moral damages totaling more than 2 million rubles were partially satisfied: according to Pivnev's defense attorney, one of the claims was not satisfied and sent "for consideration within the framework of civil proceedings". As an additional punishment, the court sentenced Pivnev to a fine of 20 thousand rubles.

Defense attorney Viktor Zaprudsky told Kommersant that he considered the verdict unfair and the punishment excessively harsh. The lawyer expressed the opinion that there were grounds for appealing the verdict, but the issue of filing an appeal should be decided together with Pivnev's parents after studying the entire text of the verdict, which was 73 pages long.

== Reactions ==
=== Reaction of officials ===
The Chairwoman of the Federation Council Valentina Matviyenko, answering a question about the need to improve the mechanism for ensuring security in Russian educational institutions after the incident in Ivanteyevka, expressed the opinion that "the family and the school missed the child." "When the child had obvious problems, the family and the school did not stand by him, did not try to listen to him, understand him, support him psychologically - this is the main problem of security," she emphasized. Matviyenko also pointed out that the safety of students in any educational institution is "the primary task and responsibility of school management".

The Commissioner for Children's Rights under the President of the Russian Federation Anna Kuznetsova, like the Speaker of the Federation Council, placed the responsibility for what happened on the parents and teachers who did not listen to the teenager who committed the attack: "The child himself literally followed everyone and said: "Look!" He literally approached everyone and waited for them to stop him. I have this feeling.

=== Perception by the media ===
Having studied the publications of a number of editions (Komsomolskaya Pravda, Moskovsky Komsomolets, Novaya Gazeta, etc.) about the attack, candidate of pedagogical sciences O. I. Gorbatkova notes that Russian mass media often “freely report personal data,” in particular, the names of students, teachers, and school numbers, which, in her opinion, is a violation of ethical and legal norms. Thus, in the publication of Komsomolskaya Pravda (“The schoolboy who opened fire at the Ivanteyevka school warned of a planned attack on a social network,” published on September 6, 2017), the researcher pointed out the inclusion in the article by the author of the most unpleasant details of the incident, many details that provoke readers to want to independently imagine what happened, as well as a mention of the existence of visual content “demonstrating the situation that happened,” which, in her opinion, further fuels readers’ interest. “The abundance of details of violence in such media texts also seems unacceptable,” the researcher concludes.

Candidate of Medical Sciences, Associate Professor N. D. Uzlov in his work “Phonosemantic Analysis of Texts on Violence and Mass Murders in Russian Educational Institutions” focuses on the use of the word “shooter” by the media when covering the attack on the school in Ivanteyevka and other similar incidents, both separately and in phrases (for example, “Ivanteyevka shooter”). “In a broad sense, a shooter is someone who knows how to shoot a weapon, a person who uses firearms. In the mass consciousness of Russians, the word “shooter” has both a negative (sniper, hired killer) and a positive connotation, being associated with justice (Stanislav Govorukhin’s film “Voroshilov Sharpshooter”),” the scientist notes.

== See also ==
- Columbine effect
- List of school-related attacks
- 2017 in Russia
- List of school attacks in Russia

== Cited works ==
- Горбаткова О. И. (2017). "Проблема насилия в школах в зеркале современных российских медиа" [The problem of violence in schools in the mirror of modern Russian media]. Медиаобразование (in Russian) (4): 189–205.
- Узлов Н. Д. (2018). "Фоносемантический анализ текстов о насилии и массовых убийствах в российских учебных заведениях" [Phonosemantic analysis of texts about violence and mass murders in Russian educational institutions]. Коллекция гуманитарных исследований (in Russian). 6 (15): 76–84.
