= Lullaby for Columbine =

Lullaby for Columbine, Love Endures

Compilation album by Various Artists
- Released: November 1, 1999
- Genre: Pop Music/Easy Listening/Contemporary Christian Music
- Length: 67:31
- Label: Lullaby for Columbine Project
- Producer: Michael Tamburello

Lullaby for Columbine, Love Endures is the name of a benefit CD released in 1999 shortly after the Columbine High School massacre where twelve students and a teacher were murdered by Eric Harris and Dylan Klebold before they committed suicide. It was previously the deadliest high school shooting in United States history. The name is synonymous with both the title cut featured on the album and the non-profit organization that produced it, whose full name is "The Lullaby for Columbine Project."

The CD was produced by musical composer/producer Michael Tamburello through the organization, based in Littleton, Colorado that he cofounded with his daughter Nina Tamburello. The CD features several notable artists including Rachael Lampa, Taylor Mesplé, and Adrian Belew, among others. Music from the CD has been aired worldwide and has been featured on NBC's Today Show with Katie Couric.

== Background ==
The project was launched a day after the tragedy by Tamburello and his daughter Nina—then about to begin high school. Together they wanted to dedicate a song he had written for her years earlier and produce a single of it with a name change from its original title, "Nina's Lullaby", to help raise funds to benefit the victims of the Columbine tragedy. Within days, other music artists learned of the endeavor and news of the project spread that attracted artists nationally.

By mid-1999, the project mushroomed into a full CD consisting of 17 songs written and recorded by both local and national artists including Adrian Belew - (King Crimson, Frank Zappa, David Bowie, Talking Heads), and Christian artists Rick Altizer, Danny Oertli, and Rachael Lampa, whose singing career launched shortly thereafter. The CD also features the famed song closely associated with the tragedy, "Friend of Mine, Columbine", by Columbine students Jonathan and Stephen Cohen. Produced by Jason Hickman, the song received much national airplay and alone raised nearly a half-million dollars for the Columbine victims. Christian songwriter and artist, Brad Richardson wrote "A Colorado Columbine", also featured on the CD. The song was inspired by a blanket of snow that fell on the morning after the Columbine shooting and evokes a spirit of cleansing and hope in the aftermath of America's deadliest school shootings.

Just as the Project's production team was ending its talent acquisition phase, a final song titled, "We Will Always Remember" that had been independently produced by Taylor Mesplé, was added, which featured Christian artist Rachael Lampa, then 14 years old and undiscovered. Taylor Mesplé also sang with Lampa along with Sydney Hostetler and the late Winston Ford (Earth, Wind & Fire, The Drifters).

Within weeks of its inception, the Project garnered more than a quarter of a million dollars of support through in-kind donations from large corporations such as Sony Disc Manufacturing, Musicland and the National Digital Television Center to facilitate nearly all production, manufacturing and distribution phases of the record project. Additional firms contributed production and post-production services, and others donated professional services to meet the Project's legal and corporate needs.

== Cover art ==
The cover art, which contributed to the unique appeal of the CD's branding, was illustrated by the late, well-known American artist, Drew Struzan. The piece was originally created by Struzan through Art for the Heart Foundation, which helped cover expenses for the production of a limited edition poster of the original art that was given to the students of Columbine High School. The art was then adopted shortly thereafter by special arrangement as the official album cover for the CD as an artistic contribution in much the same manner as the music for the CD was derived. The remaining posters, some which were signed, were donated to the Project to help raise funds for their effort.

On the tenth anniversary of the tragedy and the organization's existence, Struzan commented, "Ten years...is life so short? Live every day, love every day. Do not wait for this is your time. Choose your course today; let this be who you are. This is our gift. Do not take it for granted."

== The Organization ==
The core leadership of the Project is Michael Tamburello, Executive Director/Producer; the late Earl and Robert Berglund, owners of Penguin Digital, a CD production company; Dan Barnhart, who at that time was a partner of Barnhart/CMI; and concert promoter, the late Erin McNamara, who joined the team nine months later and brought unique solutions to project funding and distribution logistics.

== Track listing ==
1. "We Will Always Remember" (Taylor Mesplé, Sydney Hostetler, Winston Ford and Rachael Lampa) - 5:04
2. "A Colorado Columbine" (Bradford Richardson) - 3:43
3. "Peace On Earth" (Adrian Belew) - 2:54
4. "Let There Be Peace On Earth" (Colorado Children's Chorale) - 2:21
5. "Friend of Mine" (Jonathan and Stephen Cohen) - 3:27
6. "Farewell" (Kathleen Winkler) - 2:16
7. "My Last Breath" (Danny Oertli) - 3:59
8. "I'll Move On" (Court Shontz) - 3:39
9. "Prayer of the Children" (Kantorei) - 5:59
10. "Amazing Grace" (The Denver Brass/the Colorado Isle of Mull St. Andrew Pipes and Drums) - 5:38
11. "Salvation Is Created and Awake" (Arapahoe High School Wind Ensemble) - 3:48
12. "Nothing Back" (According To John (A2J)) - 4:00
13. "Risen" (Rick Altizer) - 5:12
14. "There Is a Hope" (Janet Mayhue Choyce) - 5:08
15. "Wondrous Love" (Colorado Children's Chorale) - 4:35
16. "Highland Cathedral" (The Denver Brass/the Colorado Isle of Mull St. Andrew Pipes and Drums) - 2:22
17. "Lullaby for Columbine" (Michael Tamburello) - 3:20

== Releases ==
The CD was initially released for statewide distribution in Colorado on November 1, 1999, followed by a national release on April 20, 2000 - the one-year anniversary of the Columbine tragedy. A third release for online digital distribution was announced in April, 2009 and music from the CD has since become available on iTunes and other major music sites.

== Websites ==
Official webzine: LFCNewsOnline.com
