= Tyhee, Idaho =

- Census-designated place
- Location of Tyhee in Bannock County, Idaho.

- Location within Idaho
- Coordinates: 42°57′18″N 112°27′22″W
- Country: United States
- State: Idaho
- County: Bannock

Area
  - Total: 2.878 sq mi (7.45 km^{2})
  - Land: 2.871 sq mi (7.44 km^{2})
  - Water: 0.007 sq mi (0.018 km^{2})
- Elevation: 4,469 ft (1,362 m)

Population (2020)
  - Total: 1,130
  - Density: 394/sq mi (152/km^{2})
- Time zone: UTC-7 (Mountain (MST))
  - Summer (DST): UTC-6 (MDT)
- Area codes: 208, 986
- GNIS feature ID: 2585595

Tyhee is a census-designated place in Bannock County, Idaho, United States. Its population was 1,130 at the 2020 census.

The community was named after a Bannock Indian chieftain.

== Demographics ==
=== 2020 census ===
As of the 2020 census, Tyhee had a population of 1,130, up from 1,123 as of the 2010 census. The median age was 43.2 years. 23.8% of residents were under the age of 18 and 18.0% of residents were 65 years of age or older. For every 100 females there were 117.3 males, and for every 100 females age 18 and over there were 119.6 males age 18 and over.

29.3% of residents lived in urban areas, while 70.7% lived in rural areas.

There were 380 households in Tyhee, of which 35.0% had children under the age of 18 living in them. Of all households, 76.8% were married-couple households, 9.7% were households with a male householder and no spouse or partner present, and 10.5% were households with a female householder and no spouse or partner present. About 12.1% of all households were made up of individuals and 4.7% had someone living alone who was 65 years of age or older.

There were 404 housing units, of which 5.9% were vacant. The homeowner vacancy rate was 1.7% and the rental vacancy rate was 12.5%.

Racial composition as of the 2020 census
Race	Number	Percent
White	1,008	89.2%
Black or African American	2	0.2%
American Indian and Alaska Native	22	1.9%
Asian	5	0.4%
Native Hawaiian and Other Pacific Islander	2	0.2%
Some other race	28	2.5%
Two or more races	63	5.6%
Hispanic or Latino (of any race)	69	6.1%

== Education ==
Tyhee is in the Pocatello/Chubbuck School District. Residents are zoned to Tyhee and Ellis Elementary Schools in Tyhee, Hawthorne Middle School in Pocatello, and Highland High School in Pocatello.

== See also ==
- List of census-designated places in Idaho
