= Murder of Cassie Jo Stoddart =

2006 murder in Pocatello, US

- Top: High school portrait of Stoddart Bottom: Mugshots of Adamcik (left) and Draper (right)
- Location: Pocatello, Idaho, U.S.
- Date: September 22, 2006; 20 years ago (MDT; UTC−06:00)
- Attack type: Thrill killing, child murder, stabbing, copycat crime
- Weapons: Dagger knife; Hunting knife
- Deaths: 1
- Victim: Cassie Jo Stoddart
- Perpetrators: Brian Lee Draper; Torey Michael Adamcik
- Motive: Sadism and thrill
- Verdict: Guilty of both charges
- Convictions: First-degree murder; Conspiracy to murder
- Sentence: Life imprisonment without the possibility of parole
- Litigation: Lawsuit against Pocatello School District by the victim's family

Cassie Jo Stoddart (December 21, 1989 – September 22, 2006), a 16-year-old high school junior, was a victim of a thrill killing in Pocatello, Idaho on September 22, 2006, while pet sitting her aunt and uncle’s dogs at their home. The perpetrators were her friends and classmates, Brian Lee Draper (b. March 21, 1990) and Torey Michael Adamcik (/ˈæ.dəm.tʃɪk/ ADAM-chick; b. June 14, 1990). Stoddart's body was discovered two days later, when her relatives returned home from their trip.

The perpetrators claimed that they were inspired to murder Stoddart by the slasher film Scream, which led to them being nicknamed "The Scream Killers". Adamcik and Draper recorded documentary-style videos about how they were fans of horror movies, especially Scream, and wanted to commit a similar murder in real life. They started a "Death List" of other potential victims the day of Stoddart's murder, following their initial plan.

Both perpetrators received sentences of life imprisonment without parole on August 24, 2007.

== Background ==
Draper was born in Sandy, Utah, while Adamcik was born and raised in Pocatello, Idaho. Draper's family eventually settled in Idaho. Draper met Adamcik when they were both sophomores at Pocatello High School. Both boys were interested in films and started recording films of their own.

Stoddart, along with Draper and Adamcik, were 11th graders at Pocatello High School.

Looking for fame and pleasure, the two wanted to go on a killing spree hoping to outdo Eric Harris and Dylan Klebold, the perpetrators of the Columbine High School massacre, as well as the fictional Billy Loomis and Stu Macher from the first Scream film. Draper and Adamcik made tapes detailing their plan and motive. They mentioned Harris and Klebold in their homemade videos, and were reportedly planning a "Columbine-like" shooting. Draper and Adamcik chose their two friends Matt Beckham and Cassie Jo Stoddart as their first victims.

=== Acquiring weaponry ===
One of Adamcik's friends, Joe Lucero, later testified that he bought four knives for Adamcik and Draper. Lucero said that he used $45 to pay for the knives, $40 from Draper and $5 from Adamcik. Lucero identified four of the State's exhibits as the knives he bought. Out of the four, one of the knives had a serrated blade and the other three knives were non-serrated. Lucero testified that Draper made a point to claim ownership of the serrated knife.

== Murder ==
On the night of September 22, 2006, Stoddart was house sitting for her aunt and uncle, Allison and Frank Contreras, on Whispering Cliffs Drive in northeast Bannock County. The Contreras family was out of town and had hired Stoddart to house sit their pets for the weekend. Stoddart was visited that evening by her boyfriend, Matt Beckham, who arrived around 6:00 p.m. Later, classmates Brian Draper and Torey Adamcik, who were both aged 16 at the time, came over to the house to "hang out." Stoddart gave the friends a tour of the house, including the basement. The four teens went into the living room to watch the film Kill Bill: Volume 2, but Adamcik and Draper ended up leaving before the film ended, saying they wanted to watch another movie at the movie theater instead.

Stoddart was unaware that before the boys left, Draper had unlocked the basement door so that he and Adamcik could re-enter the house undetected. Sometime after leaving the house on Whispering Cliffs, Draper and Adamcik returned to the neighborhood, parked down the street, got out of their car, and put on costumes consisting of dark clothing, gloves, and white painted masks. The boys quietly entered the house through the basement door while the other couple was watching television in the living room. They intentionally made loud noises in an unsuccessful attempt to lure Beckham and Stoddart downstairs "so they could scare them." Next, they found the circuit breaker and turned off the power in the house, hoping the pair would come downstairs to check the breaker. When Beckham and Stoddart did not come downstairs, the boys turned some of the lights back on.

Stoddart became uneasy after the temporary power outage, and Beckham noticed that one of the Contreras' dogs kept staring down the basement stairs, periodically barking or growling. Seeing that Stoddart felt scared, Beckham called his mother to ask if he could stay the night at the house with her to ease her mind, but she denied his request – instead she offered to let Stoddart come home with Beckham and stay at their house for the night, and she would bring Stoddart back to the Whispering Cliffs house the next morning. However, Stoddart felt it was her responsibility to stay at the house as she was hired to do and care for the animals and declined the offer from Beckham's mother.

At approximately 10:30 pm, Beckham's mother picked him up, leaving Stoddart at the house alone. Beckham called Adamcik's cell phone to see where he and Draper were, possibly to meet up with them later. Beckham said he could barely hear Adamcik, who was whispering on the phone, and assumed the boys were in the movie theater.

From the basement, Draper and Adamcik heard Beckham leave. The teens turned the lights out again at the circuit breaker and waited, hoping Stoddart would come downstairs to turn the lights back on; she did not. Eventually, the boys went upstairs. Draper was armed with a dagger-type weapon, and Adamcik had a hunting knife, the weapons having been purchased at a pawn shop. Draper opened and slammed a closet door at the top of the stairs to scare Stoddart, who was lying on the couch in the living room. The boys then attacked her, stabbing her approximately thirty times; twelve wounds were potentially fatal. It is believed that two knives were used, one with a serrated edge, and one without a serrated edge. Most wounds were caused by the serrated blade, but the wound that pierced her heart was caused by the non-serrated blade.

During the investigation of the murder, police found that Draper and Adamcik had made video-tapes detailing their plan to murder Stoddart and other classmates. This video footage was shown at their trials.

== Investigation ==
The boyfriend of Stoddart's mother was initially considered a person of interest after his fingerprints were found on the circuit breaker door in the basement, where the lights had been tampered with in the lead-up to the murder. However, he provided a reasonable explanation for this discovery, as he had done electrical work at the Contreras residence a few months prior to the murder, which was corroborated by the Contreras family.

The attention turned to Stoddart's boyfriend, Matt Beckham, who had been the last known person to see Stoddart alive. Beckham confirmed to police that the lights had been flickering on and off while he was present at the home. His mother explained to police that she heard Stoddart's voice from the house as Beckham came out the door. After he was cleared by a polygraph test and consistent alibi, detectives brought in Draper and Adamcik for further questioning.

Draper and Adamcik told police that after they left the Contreras residence, they went downtown to watch the movie Pulse. The teens couldn't recount any details from the movie, leading detectives to press harder to determine their whereabouts. They then claimed that they had instead "gone through cars" in the area and had not been to the movie theater. Draper eventually confessed to police, but downplayed his role in the crime.

== Arrest and interrogations ==
Draper and Adamcik were arrested on September 27, 2006, and charged with first-degree murder and conspiracy to commit first-degree murder. Across multiple interrogations, each teen blamed the other. Draper claimed he was in the same room with Adamcik when Stoddart was killed but denied stabbing her; in later interrogation he admitted to stabbing her at the behest of Adamcik, who told him to "Make sure she is dead". He led investigators to Black Rock Canyon, where the teens had partially burned and then buried the clothing, masks, and weapons they used for the murder. Police recovered a partially burned VHS tape from the location, which after restoration, showed video footage of their plans to kill Stoddart.

== Trial and sentencing ==
At trial, the prosecution revealed that the two teens were inspired by Eric Harris and Dylan Klebold, who committed the Columbine High School massacre, as well as the Scream horror film franchise. In a passage written by Draper that was shown in court during his trial titled "Columbine", it read:

I am becoming more and more obsessed with Columbine. It seems now that that’s all I think about. I would give anything to go back in time, and be a part of Eric Harris and Dylan Klebold’s lives. They are my heroes. I will follow in their footsteps and maybe I’ll even meet them.

Both teens were convicted of first-degree murder, with Draper convicted on April 17, 2007 and Adamcik on June 8, 2007. On August 31, 2007, each received a mandatory sentence of life imprisonment without the possibility of parole, plus thirty years-to-life for being convicted of conspiracy to commit murder.

Adamcik and Draper are both serving their time at Idaho State Correctional Institution, located in unincorporated Ada County, Idaho, near Kuna. In November 2019, Adamcik's sentence was upheld after his appeal was denied by the Idaho Supreme Court.

Adamcik and Draper were called to testify in the 2024 trial for the murder of Nori Jones in September 2004. The defense argued that there were other suspects who were not investigated by authorities. Neither of them testified, and the defendant was later found guilty.

== Aftermath ==
The funeral of Stoddart was held on October 1, 2006 and was attended by 500 people.

After the murder, Stoddart's family started "Pumpkins for Cassie", to honor her memory. Stoddart's grandmother and a friend ran the giveaway event, which also provided a chance for community members to help the Pocatello Animal Shelter or the Idaho Food Bank. Anyone who made a donation was handed a pumpkin.

== Appeals ==
The convicted men's attorneys filed separate appeals at the Idaho Supreme Court, in September 2010 for Adamcik and in April 2011 for Draper. Draper was seeking to have his conviction vacated or to be given a limited life sentence that would allow for his release on parole (if approved) after thirty years. The first appeal for both Adamcik and Draper was denied in a 3–2 decision. The high court vacated Draper's conviction on conspiracy to commit first-degree murder, saying that jurors were given erroneous instructions on that charge, but they affirmed his conviction for first-degree murder and life sentence without parole.

In July 2015, a hearing for post-conviction relief for Adamcik was held before state Sixth District Magistrate Judge Mitchell W. Brown. The claim was that testimony from character witnesses could have changed the outcome of the sentencing, but that his former attorney, against his parents' wishes, chose not to call upon these witnesses. Adamcik said that his attorney believed that the prosecution would have submitted even more damaging evidence. In March 2016, Judge Brown denied the request. Adamcik's counsel appealed Judge Brown's decision to the Idaho Supreme Court, which rejected the appeal and upheld the district court decision in December 2017.

Following the Idaho Supreme Court's decision, Adamcik's counsel filed a federal writ of habeas corpus in January 2018, in which it was argued that the court denied his first appeal based on a theory that was not presented to the jury. Counsel also argued that he should be entitled to a new sentencing hearing in light of the Miller and Montgomery decisions. Federal magistrate judge Candy W. Dale denied the writ in November 2019.

Judge Dale's decision was appealed to the Ninth Circuit Court of Appeals in February 2022. The court upheld the sentence in March 2022.

== Civil suit by Stoddart family ==
In 2010, the Stoddart family filed a civil lawsuit against the Pocatello School District, claiming that school authorities were negligent and should have known that Draper and Adamcik posed a threat to others. Both the civil court and the Idaho Supreme Court dismissed the case, saying the actions of the killers were not foreseeable.

== Media ==
In August 2012, Shannon Adamcik, Torey's mother, self-published the book The Guilty Innocent.

On February 16, 2023, the tape recordings that Draper and Adamcik made, along with a complete transcript of the tape recordings, were obtained from the Bannock County court system through the Idaho Public Records Act.

This case has been featured in several different television shows and programs including a February 18, 2024, episode of the popular true crime series Dateline with correspondent Keith Morrison. Draper and Adamcik were interviewed as potential suspects in the murder of Nori Jones as part of the Cold Justice episode, "Still of the Night", which aired in January 2015.

Draper and Adamcik were featured in Lost for Life (2013), a documentary about juveniles who are serving life in prison without parole and their victims' families.

This case was the feature of the docuseries The Scream Murder: A True Teen Horror Story (2026).

== Documentaries ==
- In Coldest Blood (Television production). MSNBC. May 20, 2012.
- Rofé, Joshua (June 22, 2013). Lost for Life (Motion picture).
- "When the Lights Go Out". Your Worst Nightmare. Season 1. Episode 2. October 29, 2014. Investigation Discovery.
- "Scream". CopyCat Killers. Season 1. Episode 1. February 27, 2016. Reelz USA.
- "Stick to the Plan". Murder Among Friends. Season 2. Episode 16. July 20, 2017. Investigation Discovery.
- "The Final Scream". Unmasked. Season 1. Episode 2. October 22, 2018.
- "Evil in the Basement". A Time to Kill. Season 4. Episode 6. August 13, 2021.
- "The Secret in Black Rock Canyon". Dateline. Season 32. Episode 28. February 18, 2024.
- "The Murder of Cassie Jo Stoddart". Killer Connections. Season 1. Episode 2. June 15, 2024.
- The Scream Murder: A True Teen Horror Story (Motion picture). February 11, 2026.

== See also ==
- Murder of Nori Jones
- Columbine effect
- Slender Man stabbing
- Folie à deux
