= Idaho Vandals basketball =

Idaho Vandals basketball may refer to either of the basketball teams that represent the University of Idaho:

- Idaho Vandals men's basketball
- Idaho Vandals women's basketball
