= Pocatello High School =

Public school in Idaho, United States

Coordinates: 42.863°N 112.454°W

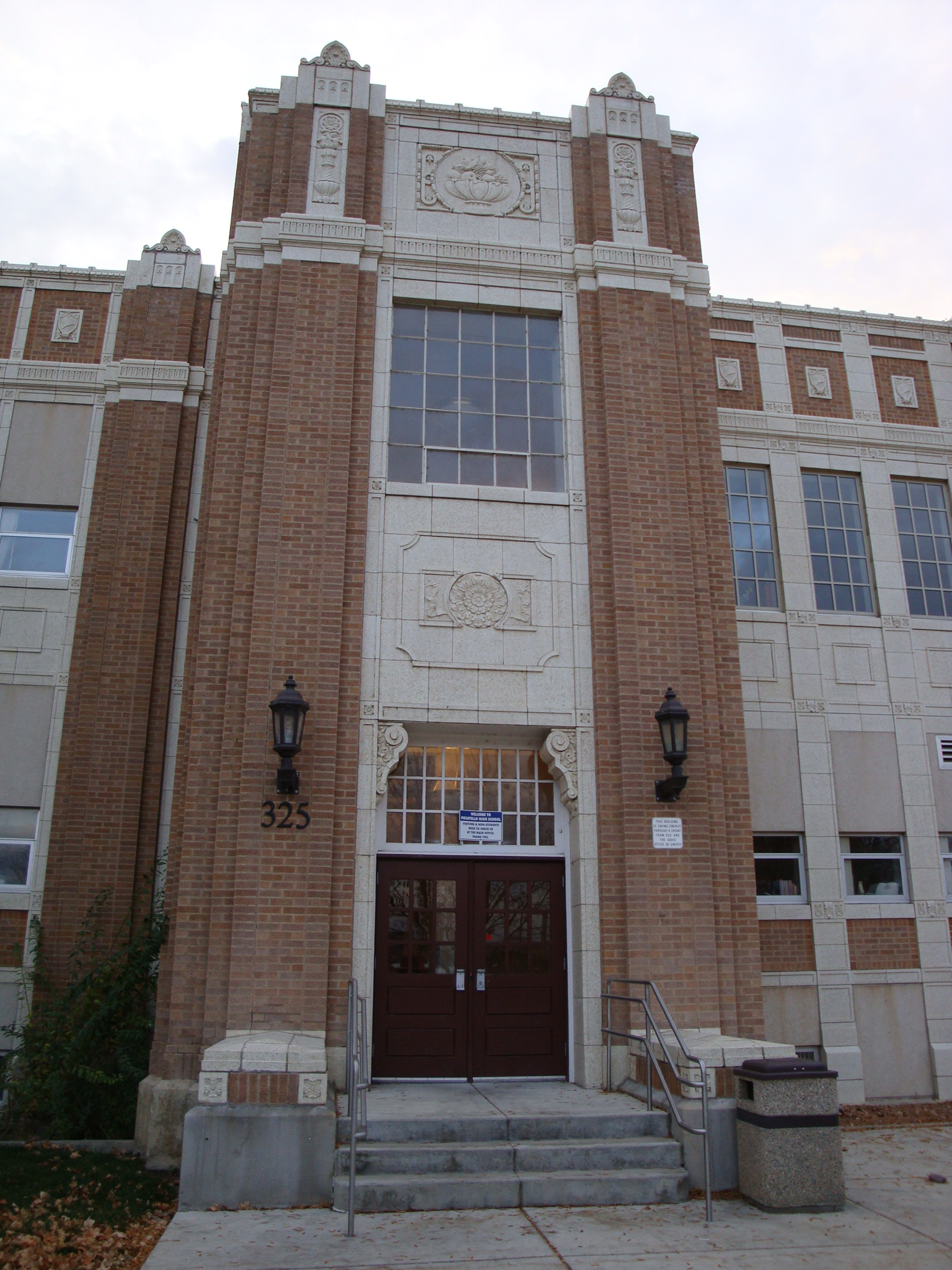
- Front entrance in 2008
- 325 N. Arthur Ave. Pocatello, Idaho; United States

Information
- Type: Public
- Motto: "Where Everybody is Somebody"
- Established: 1892
- School district: Pocatello/Chubbuck S.D.
- Principal: Heidi Graham
- Teaching staff: 58.93 (on an FTE basis)
- Grades: 9–12
- Enrollment: 1,328 (2023–2024)
- Student to teacher ratio: 22.54
- Colors: Red, Navy, White
- Athletics: IHSAA Class 5A
- Athletics conference: South East Idaho (Southeast)
- Mascot: Thunder
- Rivals: Highland, Century
- Newspaper: Chieftain
- Yearbook: Pocatellian
- Elevation: 4,470 ft (1,360 m) AMSL
- Website: pocatello.sd25.us

Pocatello High School is a four-year public high school in Pocatello, Idaho, United States. It is the oldest of the three traditional high schools of the Pocatello/Chubbuck School District and serves the southwest portion. The school colors are red, blue, and white. The mascot was an "Indian"; the city's namesake, Chief Pocatello, was the leader of the Shoshone people. The mascot was changed to the Thunder in June 2021 as it was judged to be insensitive.

== History ==
The school was constructed in late spring and summer of 1892 at a cost of $18,281. According to the Bannock County Historical Society, the school was originally called West Side School, holding all grades in the same school. Pocatello High School was the most impressive building in the area during the early 1900s and on many occasions the school served as a town square where concerts and athletic contests were held. Two presidents of the United States spoke on the grounds of Pocatello High School, President Theodore Roosevelt in 1902 and William Howard Taft in 1908. John F. Kennedy would visit in 1960 and speak during a campaign trip.

In 1914, a fire started in the boiler room and much of the interior of the high school was destroyed. The school was rebuilt using the shell of the damaged building. There were several minor additions to the school in 1901, 1903, 1916, and 1920. In 1939 the old school was remodeled, adding the terra cotta facade over the original stone exterior, the north and south wings, and a new gymnasium currently known as "the Pit". In 1968, a fine arts addition was added and included choir, band, drama and art classrooms. Due to an concerns around energy efficiency, most large windows designed by architect Frank Paradice were boarded over and smaller energy conserving windows were added in 1981. In 1996 major renovations were added to the school which took three years to complete. These renovations included new floors, lights, sidewalks, heating system, and windows. A new gymnasium known as "the Palace" was built in 2004. In 2019, a new ADA-accessible main entrance and remodeled administration offices were added to the school. A new science wing and catwalk between the two buildings was completed in 2021.

Architect Frank H. Paradice, Jr., who moved to Pocatello around 1915, reportedly designed the high school, presumably the new construction one replacing the one destroyed by fire in 1914.

In December 2021, a construction project connected the two buildings of Pocatello High School, as well as adding several new classrooms and a "commons" area.

Since the 1950's, there have been sightings and reports of paranormal activity on the property. Urban legends have been proven fake but rumors among students hearing voices and feeling hugged remained under speculation for years. In 2014, security camera footage caught what many to believe was a ghost. In 2019 the school appeared for the first episode of the 13th season of Ghost Hunters.

== Achievements ==
In 1989, Pocatello High School received the Presidential Excellence award, one of only 165 awards given in the nation.

== Athletics ==
Pocatello competes in athletics in IHSAA Class 5A in the South East Idaho (Southeast) Conference with Century and Preston. PHS traditionally competed with the largest schools in the state in Class 5A (formerly A-1); a drop in enrollment caused a change to Class 4A. The school returned to 5A classification in the 2024-25 school year due to the IHSAA reclassifying 1A Division II as 2A, thereby moving all other divisions up by one classification number.

- From 2011-2015 the boys cross country won 5 state Championships in a row.
- In 2000, the boys basketball team successfully defended the A-1 (now 5A) state championship.
- The PHS football team won the state 4A title in November 2006.
  - Four A-1 (now 5A) state titles in football were won in six-season span (1989, 1990, 1992, 1994).
- The 2012 baseball team won the state 4A championship, its first.

=== Rivalries ===
Pocatello High School has intra-city rivalries with Highland (1963) and Century (1999). The annual football game between Pocatello and Highland is known as the "Black and Blue Bowl." A tradition of rivalry between the schools is to paint the large rock outside of the other schools.

=== State titles ===
Boys

- Cross Country (6): fall 1980; (4A) 2011, 2012, 2013, 2014, 2015 (introduced in 1964)
- Basketball (11): 1927, 1929, 1936, 1942, 1944, 1957, 1962, 1969, 1999, 2000, 2024
- Wrestling (8): 1968, 1972, 1973, 1974, 1976, 1990, 1991, 1992 (introduced in 1958)
- Baseball (5): (4A) 1950, 1951, 1955, 2012, 2023 (records not kept by IHSAA, state tourney introduced in 1971)
- Track (5): 1939, 1941, 1942, 1958, (4A) 2009
- Golf (3): 1957, 1962, 1990, 2007, 2008 (introduced in 1956)
- Football (5): fall 1989, 1990, 1992, 1994: (4A) 2006 (official with introduction of playoffs, fall 1979)
  - (unofficial poll titles - 0) (poll introduced in 1963 and used through 1978)

Girls

- Cross Country (2): fall 1995, 1996 (introduced in 1974)
- Volleyball (1): fall 1990 (introduced in 1976)
- Track (5): 1975, 1982, 1994, 1995, 1996 2022 (introduced in 1971)
- Dance: All-State Champions 2012
- Softball (1): 2024
- Soccer (1): 2024
- Basketball (2): 2025, 2026

== Controversy ==
=== School mascot incident ===
Until the 1970s, the Pocatello High School mascot was a Native American caricature named Osky Ow Wow, "a little Mohawk-looking guy with buck teeth, dark skin, big round eyes and a Mohawk haircut." As late as 2015, the school's dance team, the Indianettes, continued to perform a routine in which female students dressed up in stereotypical Native American outfits and performed a mock "Indian" dance. In December 2020, the Pocatello School District selected "Thunder" as the high school’s new mascot, effective June 2021.

=== Murder of Cassie Jo Stoddart ===
On September 22, 2006, Pocatello High School student Cassie Jo Stoddart was stabbed to death by classmates Brian Draper and Torey Adamcik in Pocatello, Idaho. Both perpetrators received sentences of life imprisonment without parole on August 31, 2007. In 2010, the Stoddart family filed a civil lawsuit against the Pocatello School District, claiming that school authorities were negligent and should have known that Draper and Adamcik posed a threat to others. Both the civil court and the Idaho Supreme Court dismissed the case, saying the actions of the killers were not foreseeable.

=== Coach photo incident ===
In October 2013, a former girls' basketball coach, Laraine Cook, was fired over a Facebook photo where her fiancé, Tom Harrison, a football coach at Pocatello High School, holds her breast. Cook told the local Pocatello ABC affiliate that she was fired and not Harrison because she was the one who posted the photo.

== Notable alumni ==
- Minerva Teichert (class of 1906), 20th-century American painter notable for her art depicting Western and Mormon subjects
- Babe Caccia (1936), head football coach of the Idaho State Bengals (1952–65)
- Charles McDevitt (1950), justice of the Idaho Supreme Court (1989–97), chief justice (1993–97)
- Kent Hadley (c.1952), baseball player (Kansas City Athletics, New York Yankees, Nankai Hawks)
- Duke Sims (1959), baseball player (Cleveland Indians, Los Angeles Dodgers, Detroit Tigers, New York Yankees, Texas Rangers)
- Larry Boyle (1961), justice of the Idaho Supreme Court (1989–92)
- Mark Nye (1963), attorney and politician
- Cynthia K.C. Meyer (c.1978), justice of the Idaho Supreme Court (2023–present)
- Brian Draper and Torey Adamcik (2008), American high school students currently serving life sentences for murdering classmate Cassie Jo Stoddart on September 22, 2006.

== Popular culture ==
Pocatello High School featured in the August 29, 2019 episode of Ghost Hunters.
