= National Register of Historic Places listings in Bannock County, Idaho =

Location of Bannock County in Idaho

This is a list of the National Register of Historic Places listings in Bannock County, Idaho.

This is intended to be a complete list of the properties and districts on the National Register of Historic Places in Bannock County, Idaho, United States. Latitude and longitude coordinates are provided for many National Register properties and districts; these locations may be seen together in a map.

There are 30 properties and districts listed on the National Register in the county, including 1 National Historic Landmark. More may be added; properties and districts nationwide are added to the Register weekly.

This National Park Service list is complete through NPS recent listings posted April 17, 2026.

== Current listings ==
	Name on the Register	Image	Date listed	Location	City or town	Description
1	A.F.R. Building	A.F.R. Building	November 15, 1990 (#90001737)	501 N. Main St. 42°51′55″N 112°27′13″W	Pocatello	
2	Bethel Baptist Church	Bethel Baptist Church	September 30, 2021 (#100007013)	401 North 5th Ave. 42°52′08″N 112°26′47″W	Pocatello	
3	Brady Memorial Chapel	Brady Memorial Chapel	May 1, 1979 (#79000772)	Mountain View Cemetery, 1520 S. 5th Ave. 42°51′20″N 112°25′44″W	Pocatello	
4	Church of the Assumption	Church of the Assumption	May 1, 1979 (#79000773)	528 N. 5th Ave. 42°52′12″N 112°26′46″W	Pocatello	
5	East Side Downtown Historic District		November 25, 1994 (#94001361)	Roughly including the 200 and 300 blocks of E. Center St., the 100 block of N. 2nd Ave., and the 100 block of S. 2nd Ave. 42°51′43″N 112°26′46″W	Pocatello	
6	Fort Hall	Fort Hall	October 15, 1966 (#66000306)	11 miles west of Fort Hall on the Fort Hall Indian Reservation; 43°01′24″N 112°37′58″W	Fort Hall	Site of the first Fort Hall, 1834-1856
7	H.O. Harkness Stable Building	H.O. Harkness Stable Building	February 1, 1980 (#80001293)	105 S. Railroad Ave. 42°39′21″N 112°11′33″W	McCammon	
8	John Hood House	John Hood House	December 14, 1978 (#78001043)	554 S. 7th Ave. 42°51′58″N 112°26′17″W	Pocatello	
9	William A. Hyde House	William A. Hyde House	June 23, 1983 (#83000259)	429 N. 7th St. 42°52′10″N 112°26′39″W	Pocatello	
10	Idaho State University Administration Building	Idaho State University Administration Building	September 23, 1993 (#93000994)	919 S. 8th St., Building 10, on the Idaho State University campus 42°51′43″N 112°25′58″W	Pocatello	
11	Idaho State University Neighborhood Historic District		September 7, 1984 (#84001008)	Roughly bounded by 6th, 9th, Carter, and Center Sts. 42°51′57″N 112°26′15″W	Pocatello	
12	L.D.S. Ward Building		December 9, 1999 (#99001474)	187 S. 2nd Ave. 42°37′04″N 112°00′51″W	Lava Hot Springs	
13	Lava High School Gymnasium		July 9, 1997 (#97000764)	202 W. Fife St. 42°37′00″N 112°00′52″W	Lava Hot Springs	
14	Lincoln-Johnson Avenues Residential Historic District		March 15, 2006 (#06000126)	Roughly bounded by W. Hayden St., the Portneuf River, W. Benton St., and the West Bench; 42°51′30″N 112°27′17″W	Pocatello	
15	McCammon State Bank Building	McCammon State Bank Building	July 9, 1979 (#79000771)	206 Center St. 42°39′14″N 112°11′40″W	McCammon	Built in 1906, now the Harkness Hotel
16	Old Town Residential Historic District		April 2, 2008 (#08000249)	Roughly bounded by W. Benton, S. Garfield, and W. Lewis Sts., and the Portneuf River; 42°51′30″N 112°27′06″W	Pocatello	
17	Pocatello Carnegie Library	Pocatello Carnegie Library	July 2, 1973 (#73000679)	113 S. Garfield Ave. 42°51′38″N 112°27′08″W	Pocatello	
18	Pocatello Federal Building	Pocatello Federal Building	October 5, 1977 (#77000452)	150 S. Arthur Ave. 42°51′40″N 112°27′00″W	Pocatello	
19	Pocatello Historic District	Pocatello Historic District	June 3, 1982 (#82002505)	Roughly bounded by railroad tracks and W. Fremont, W. Bonneville, and Garfield Sts. 42°51′44″N 112°27′03″W	Pocatello	
20	Pocatello Warehouse Historic District		September 3, 1996 (#96000946)	Roughly bounded by S. 2nd Ave., E. Halliday, E. Sutter, and the Oregon Short Line railroad tracks 42°51′29″N 112°26′20″W	Pocatello	
21	Pocatello Westside Residential Historic District		March 17, 2003 (#03000102)	Roughly bounded by N. Arthur Ave., W. Fremont St., N. Grant Ave., and W. Young St. 42°51′53″N 112°27′26″W	Pocatello	
22	Quinn Apartments	Quinn Apartments	January 11, 1985 (#85000057)	580 W. Clark St. 42°51′41″N 112°27′12″W	Pocatello	
23	Rice-Packard House	Rice-Packard House	September 12, 1985 (#85002159)	454 N. Hayes Ave. 42°51′48″N 112°27′21″W	Pocatello	
24	Riverside Inn		August 29, 1979 (#79000770)	255 E. Portneuf St. 42°37′11″N 112°00′33″W	Lava Hot Springs	
25	St. Joseph's Catholic Church	St. Joseph's Catholic Church	August 29, 1978 (#78001044)	455 N. Hayes; 42°51′46″N 112°27′23″W	Pocatello	
26	Standrod House	Standrod House	January 18, 1973 (#73000680)	648 N. Garfield Ave. 42°51′54″N 112°27′27″W	Pocatello	
27	Sullivan-Kinney House	Sullivan-Kinney House	November 9, 1977 (#77000453)	441 S. Garfield Ave. 42°51′29″N 112°26′55″W	Pocatello	
28	Trinity Episcopal Church	Trinity Episcopal Church	February 17, 1978 (#78001045)	248 N. Arthur St. 42°51′47″N 112°27′08″W	Pocatello	
29	Whitestone Hotel		April 7, 1980 (#80001292)	2nd Ave. and Main St. 42°37′11″N 112°00′31″W	Lava Hot Springs	Demolished in 1997
30	Woolley Apartments	Woolley Apartments	October 31, 1985 (#85003425)	303 N. Hayes Ave. 42°51′42″N 112°27′18″W	Pocatello	

== See also ==
- List of National Historic Landmarks in Idaho
- National Register of Historic Places listings in Idaho
