= University Neighborhood Historic District =

University Neighborhood Historic District may refer to:

- Idaho State University Neighborhood Historic District, Pocatello, Idaho, listed on the National Register of Historic Places (NRHP)
- University Neighborhood Historic District (Columbia, South Carolina), in Richland County, NRHP-listed
- University Neighborhood Historic District (Salt Lake City, Utah), NRHP-listed
- University Neighborhood Historic District (Laramie, Wyoming), in Albany County, NRHP-listed

== See also ==
- University Park Historic District (disambiguation)
