= University Park Historic District =

University Park Historic District may refer to:

- University Park Historic District (Tempe, Arizona), listed on the U.S. National Register of Historic Places (NRHP) in Maricopa County
- University Park Historic District (Little Rock, Arkansas), NRHP-listed in Little Rock
- North University Park Historic District, Los Angeles, California, NRHP-listed
- University Park-Emory Highlands-Emory Estates Historic District, Decatur, Georgia, NRHP-listed
- University Park (Indianapolis, Indiana), NRHP-listed
- University Park Historic District (University Park, Maryland), NRHP-listed
- University Park Historic District (Buffalo, New York), NRHP-listed

== See also ==
- University Neighborhood Historic District (disambiguation)
