= Edward A. Diebolt House =

Historic house in New York, United States

- U.S. National Register of Historic Places
- U.S. Historic district – Contributing property
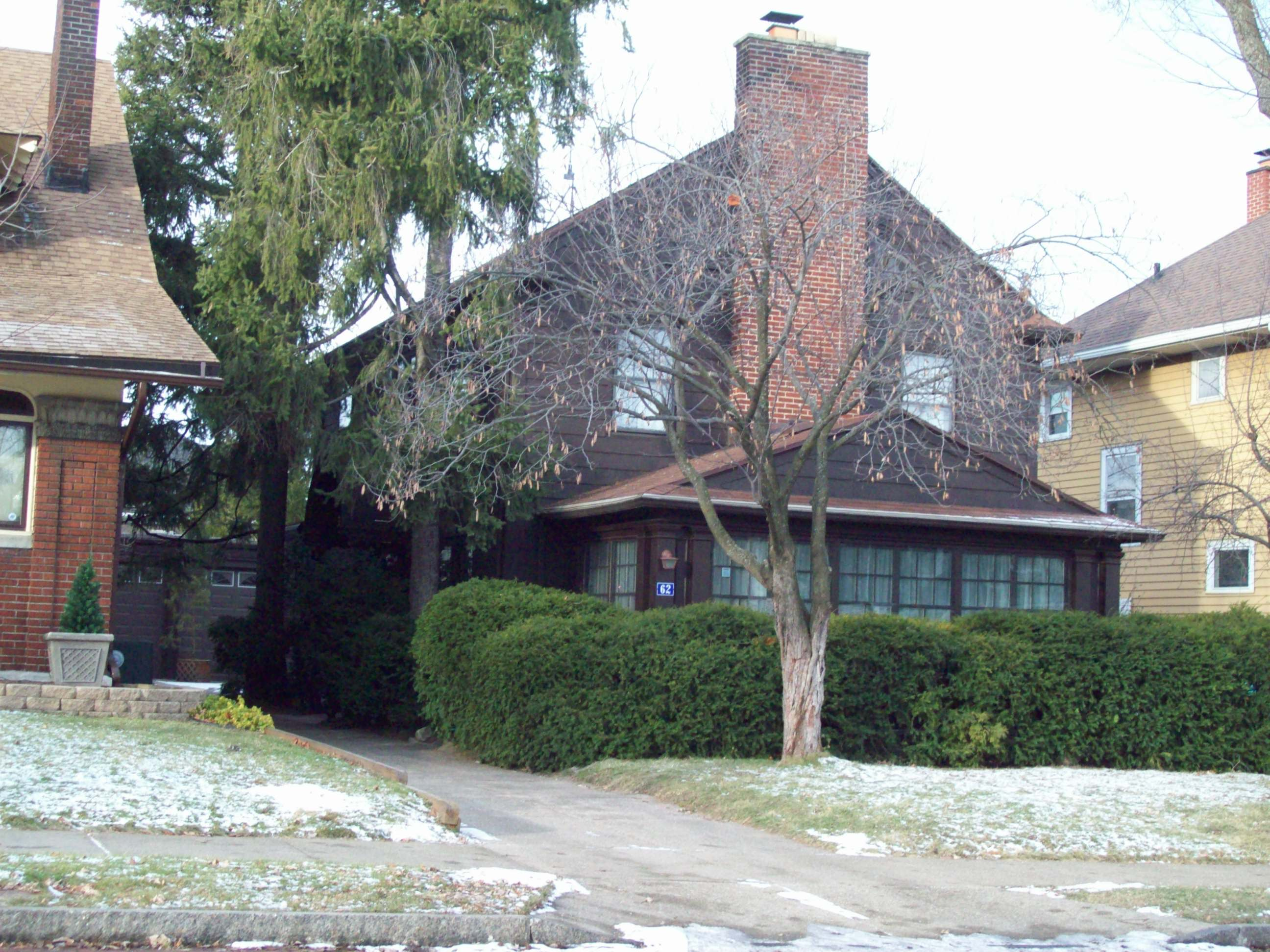
- Edward A. Diebolt House, December 2009

- Location within New York Location within the United States
- Location: 62 Niagara Falls Blvd., Buffalo, New York
- Coordinates: 42°57′53″N 78°49′23″W
- Area: less than one acre
- Built: 1922
- Architectural style: Colonial Revival
- NRHP reference No.: 06000565
- Added to NRHP: July 12, 2006

Edward A. Diebolt House is a historic home located at Buffalo in Erie County, New York. It is a Colonial Revival style frame house built in 1922–1923. It is representative of the standardized floor plan home constructed in the immediate post-World War I period and retains complete integrity.

It was listed on the National Register of Historic Places in 2006. It is located in the University Park Historic District.
