= Idaho State University Administration Building =

- U.S. National Register of Historic Places
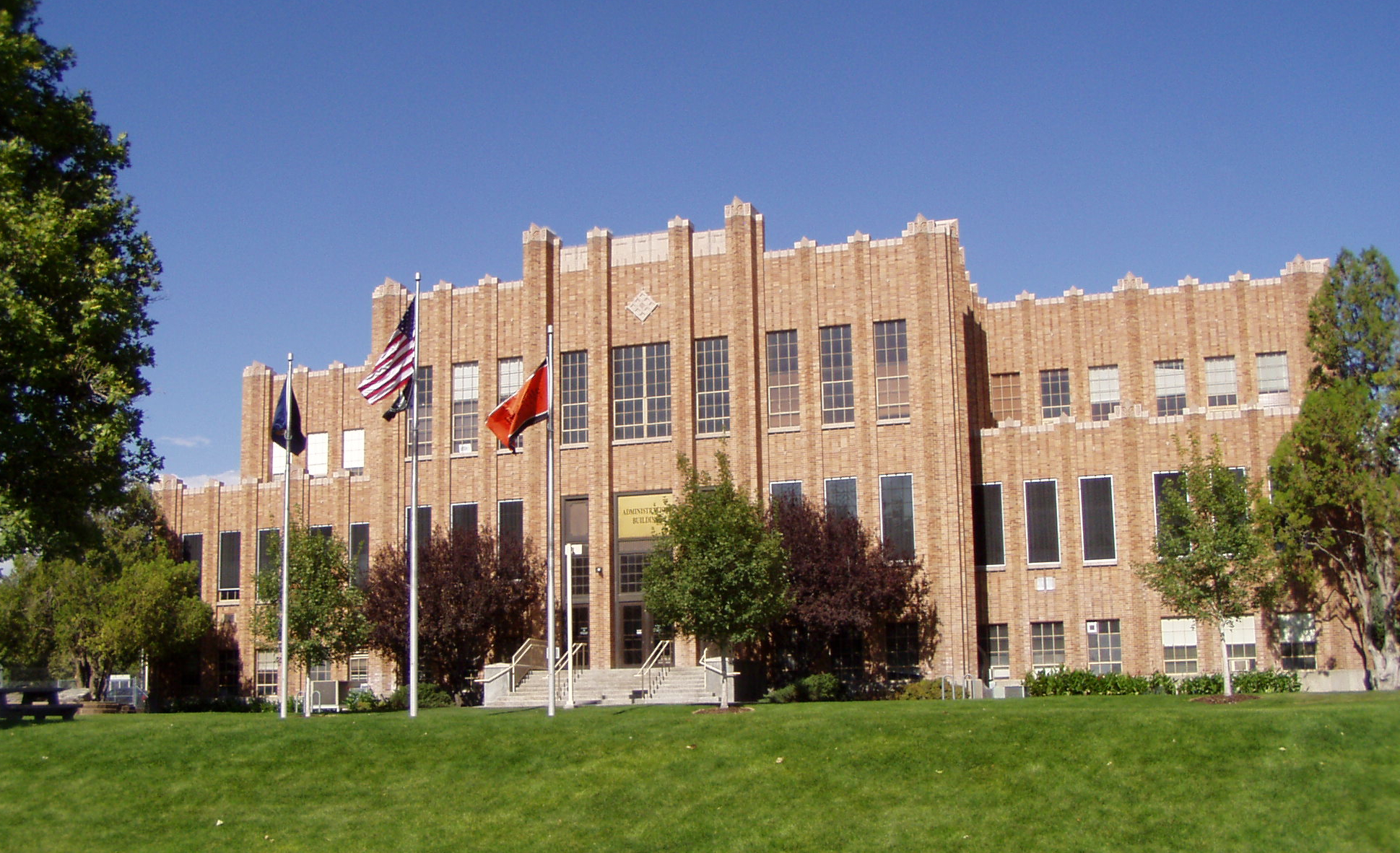
- The building in 2012

- Location within Idaho Location within the United States
- Location: 919 South 8th Street, Building No. 10, Idaho State University, Pocatello, Idaho
- Coordinates: 42°51′43″N 112°25′58″W
- Area: 1 acre (0.40 ha)
- Built: 1939
- Architect: Frank G. Paradise, Henry J. Hulvey
- Architectural style: Art Deco
- NRHP reference No.: 93000994
- Added to NRHP: September 23, 1993

The Idaho State University Administration Building is a historic two-story building on the campus of Idaho State University in Pocatello, Idaho. It was built as a student union in 1939, and designed in the Art Deco style by architect Frank G. Paradice. It became the administration building in 1961, after it was renovated by architect Henry J. Hulvey. The building was Pocatello's hot spot for dances utilizing its ballroom on the third floor. It has been listed on the National Register of Historic Places since September 23, 1993.
