= Woolley Apartments =

- U.S. National Register of Historic Places
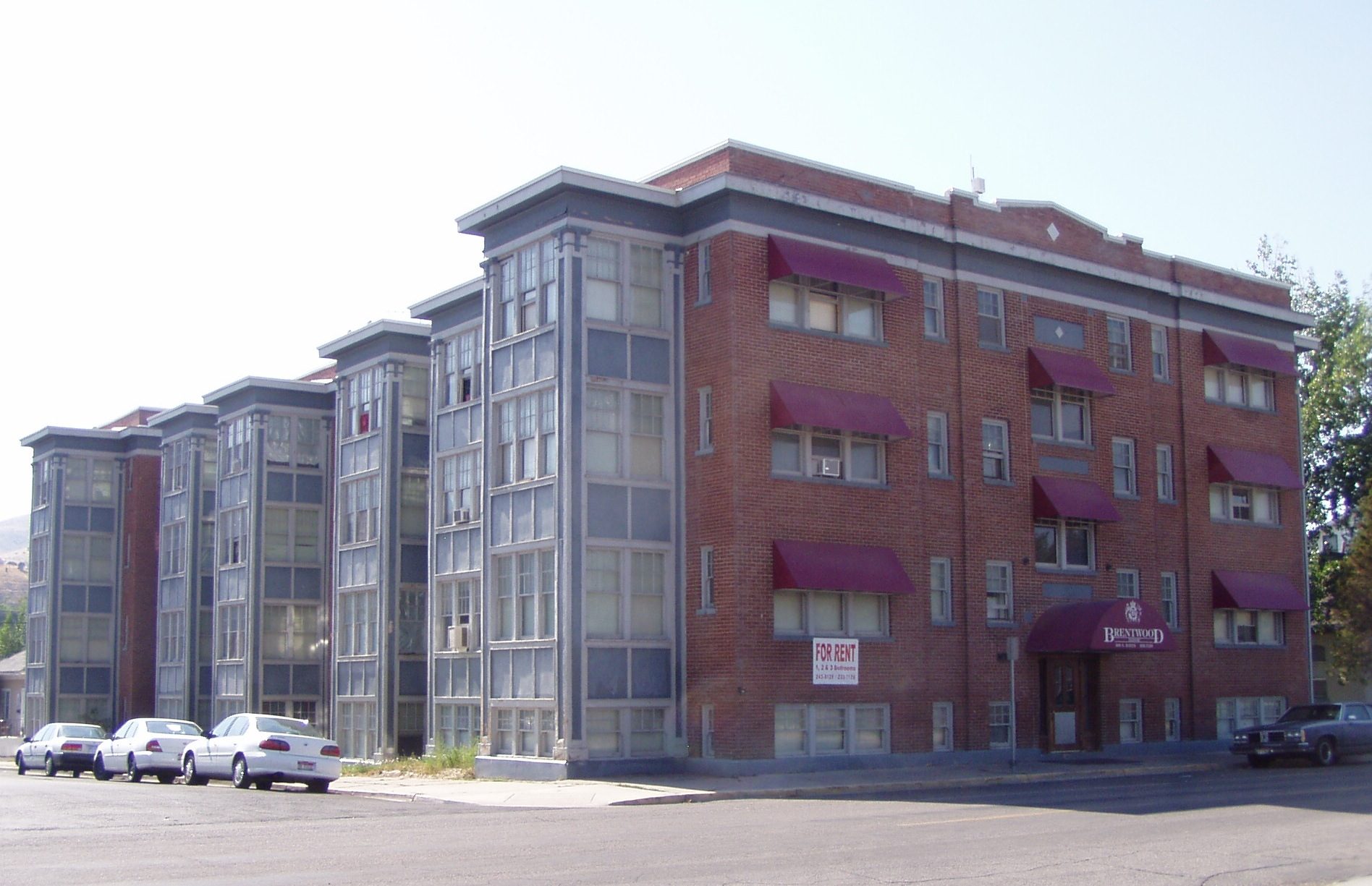

- Location within Idaho Location within the United States
- Location: 303 N. Hayes Ave., Pocatello, Idaho
- Coordinates: 42°51′42″N 112°27′18″W
- Area: less than one acre
- Built: 1920
- Architectural style: Prairie School, Bungalow/craftsman
- NRHP reference No.: 85003425
- Added to NRHP: October 31, 1985

The Woolley Apartments, at 303 North Hayes Avenue in Pocatello, Idaho, is an apartment building constructed in 1920. It was listed on the National Register of Historic Places in 1985.

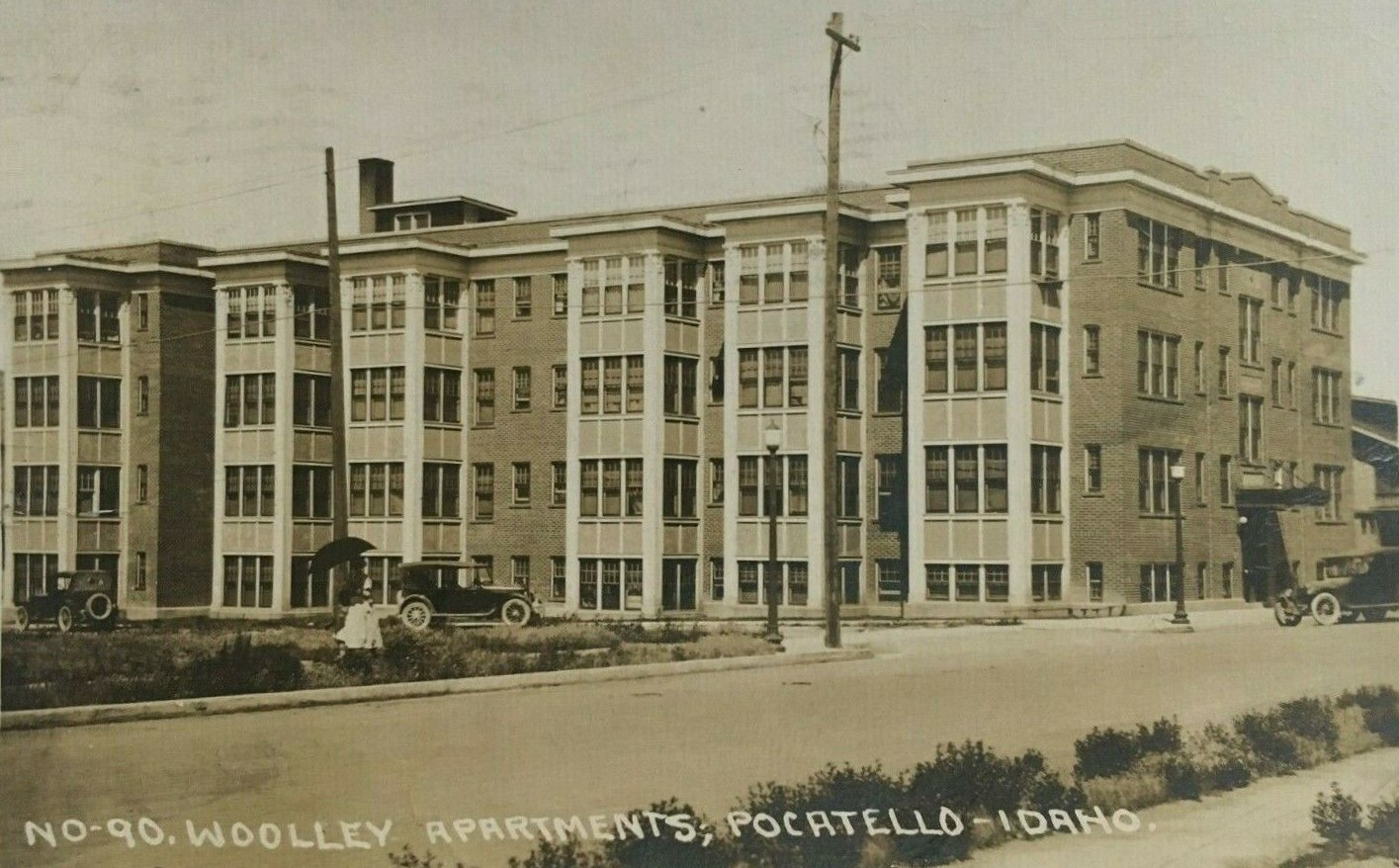
The Wooley Apartments were shown in a postcard mailed in 1923.

It is a four-story brick and wood building upon a concrete foundation. Its design reflects influence of Prairie School and Craftsman styles, especially in projecting wooden bays on north and south sides. The bricks are laid in common bond.

The developer was Hyrum Smith Woolley Jr., whose father Hyrum Smith Woolley Jr. was prominent in business in Idaho, whose father-in-law was William Budge and whose grandfather was Charles Coulson Rich, early Mormon pioneer and founder of San Bernardino, California.
