= Standrod House =

- U.S. National Register of Historic Places

- Location within Idaho Location within the United States
- Location: 648 North Garfield Avenue, Pocatello, Idaho
- Coordinates: 42°51′54″N 112°27′27″W
- Area: less than one acre
- Built: 1897
- Architectural style: Châteauesque
- NRHP reference No.: 73000680
- Added to NRHP: January 18, 1973

The Standrod House, also known as the Stanrod Castle, is a historic house in Pocatello, Idaho. It was built in 1897 for Drew William Standrod, a judge, bank president, and Anti-Mormon. The house was designed in the Châteauesque architectural style. It has been listed on the National Register of Historic Places since January 18, 1973.
