= Church of the Assumption (Pocatello, Idaho) =

Historic church in Idaho, United States

- U.S. National Register of Historic Places
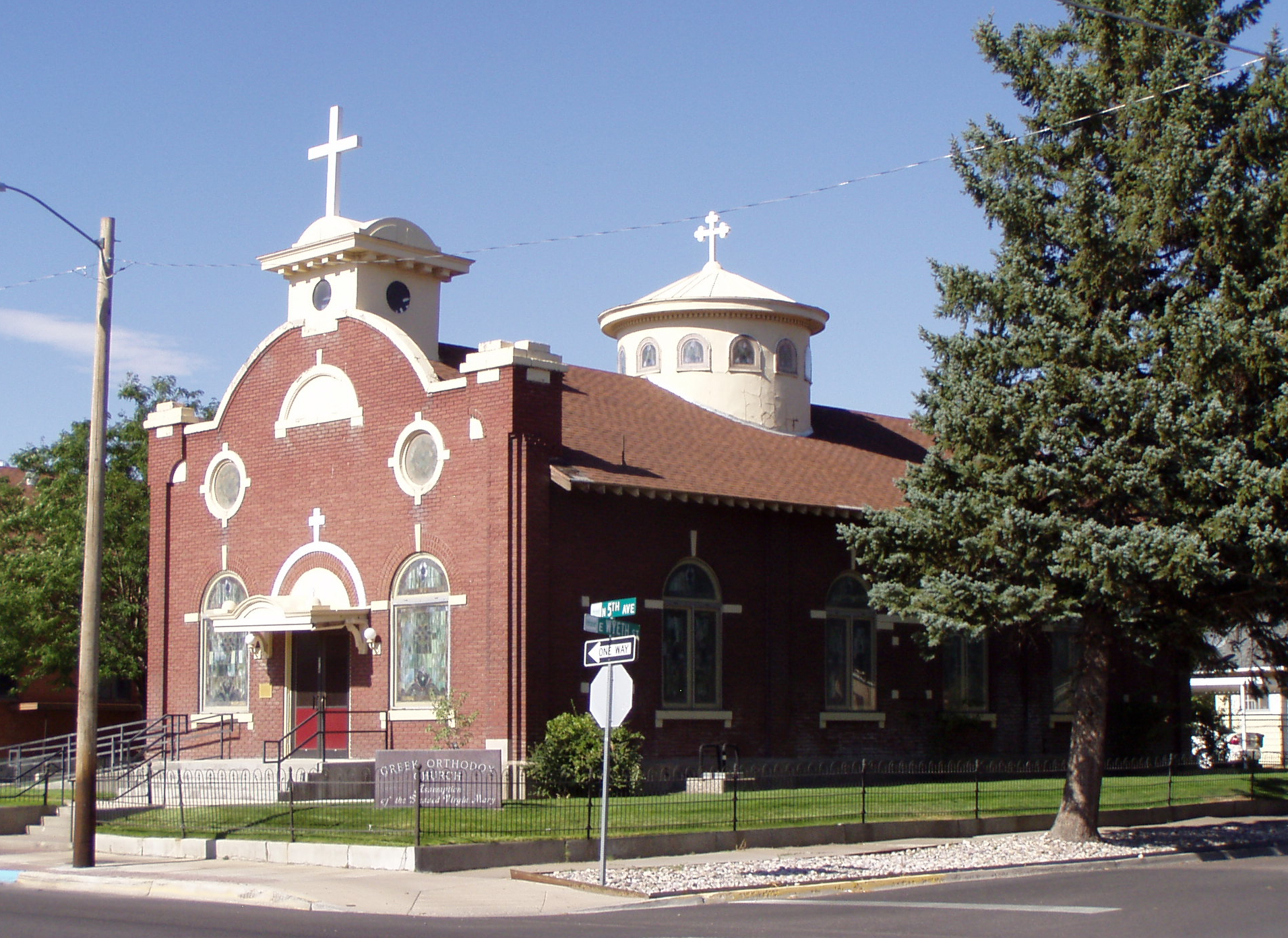

- Location within Idaho Location within the United States
- Location: 528 N. 5th Ave., Pocatello, Idaho
- Coordinates: 42°52′12″N 112°26′46″W
- Area: less than one acre
- Built: 1915
- Built by: North Pacific Construction Company
- Architect: Charles B. Onderdonk
- Architectural style: Byzantine Revival
- NRHP reference No.: 79000773
- Added to NRHP: May 1, 1979

The Church of the Assumption at 528 N. 5th Avenue in Pocatello, Idaho, also known as the Hellenic Orthodox Church, is a Byzantine Revival-style building constructed in 1915. It was added to the National Register in 1979.

It was then the older of the only two Hellenic Orthodox churches in Idaho. Pocatello architect Charles B. Onderdonk was involved in its design or construction; Onderdonk is also associated with the Peery Hotel in Salt Lake City, Utah.
