= Sullivan-Kinney House =

- U.S. National Register of Historic Places
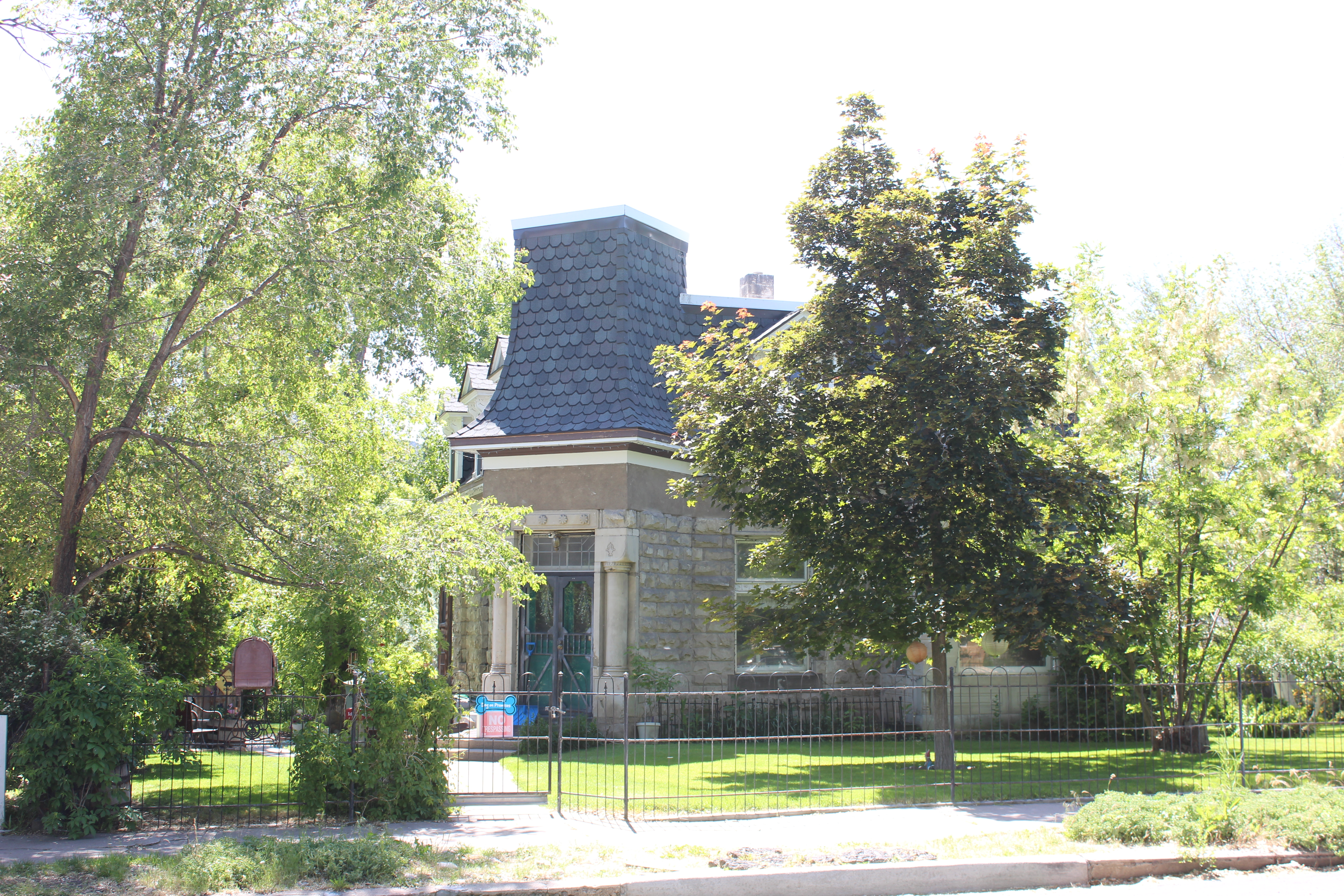

- Location within Idaho Location within the United States
- Location: 441 S. Garfield, Pocatello, Idaho
- Coordinates: 42°51′29″N 112°26′55″W
- Area: less than one acre
- Built: 1894
- Architectural style: Second Empire, Mansard
- NRHP reference No.: 77000453
- Added to NRHP: November 9, 1977

The Sullivan-Kinney House, at 441 S. Garfield Ave. in Pocatello, Idaho, was built in 1894 in Second Empire style. It was listed on the National Register of Historic Places in 1977.
