= Pocatello Carnegie Library =

- U.S. National Register of Historic Places
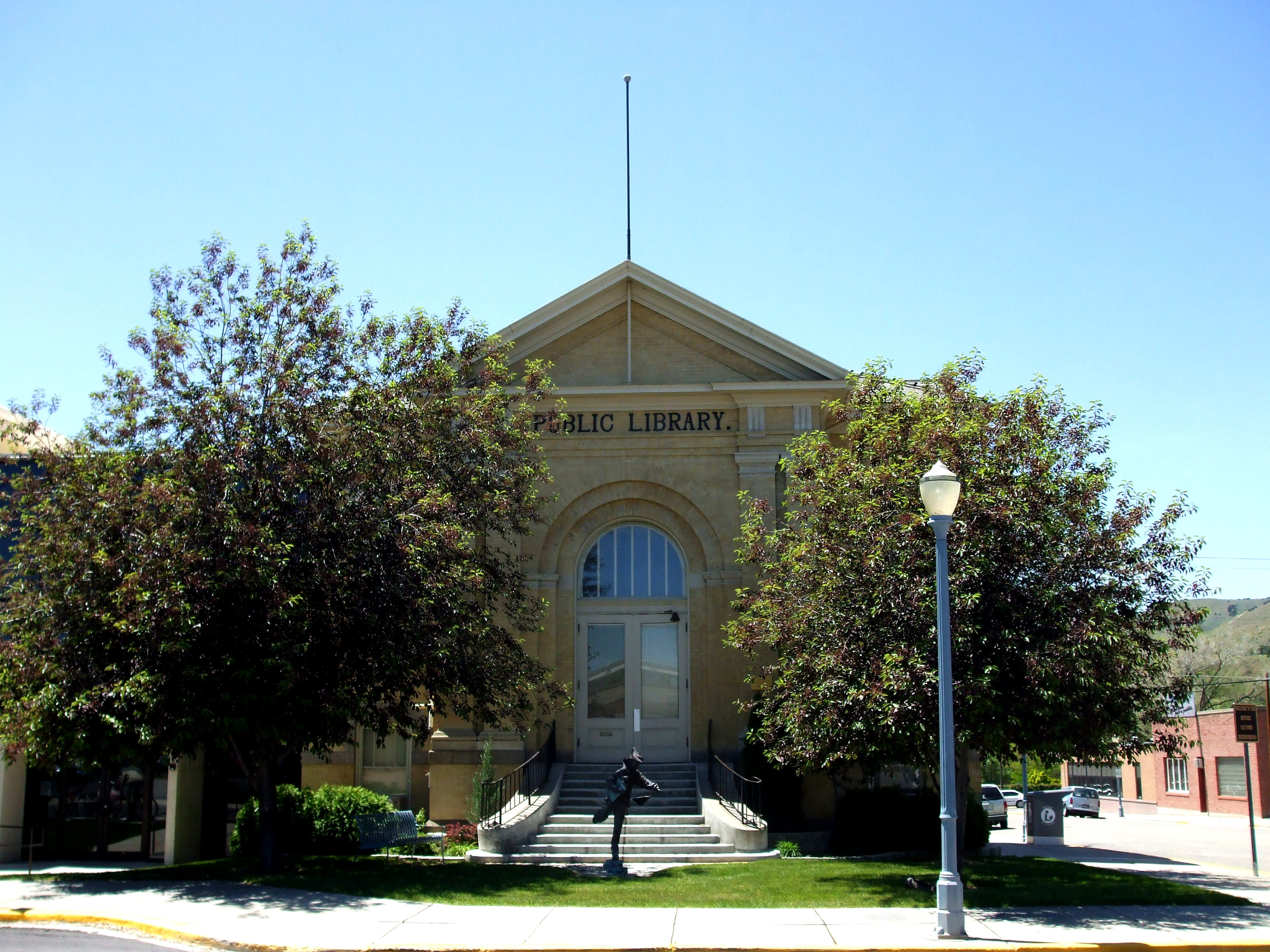
- The library in 2010

- Location within Idaho Location within the United States
- Location: 105 South Garfield Avenue, Pocatello, Idaho
- Coordinates: 42°51′38″N 112°27′08″W
- Area: 0.3 acres (0.12 ha)
- Built: 1907
- Architectural style: Palladian
- NRHP reference No.: 73000679
- Added to NRHP: July 2, 1973

The Pocatello Carnegie Library is a historic building in Pocatello, Idaho. It was built as a Carnegie library in 1907, and designed in the Palladian architectural style. According to Arthur Hart, the director of the Idaho State Historical Museum, "Pilasters are topped with stone triglyphs in the narrow frieze. On the entry facade the words 'Public Library' in appropriate Roman letters identify the buildings original function." The building has been listed on the National Register of Historic Places since July 2, 1973.
