= John Hood House =

- U.S. National Register of Historic Places
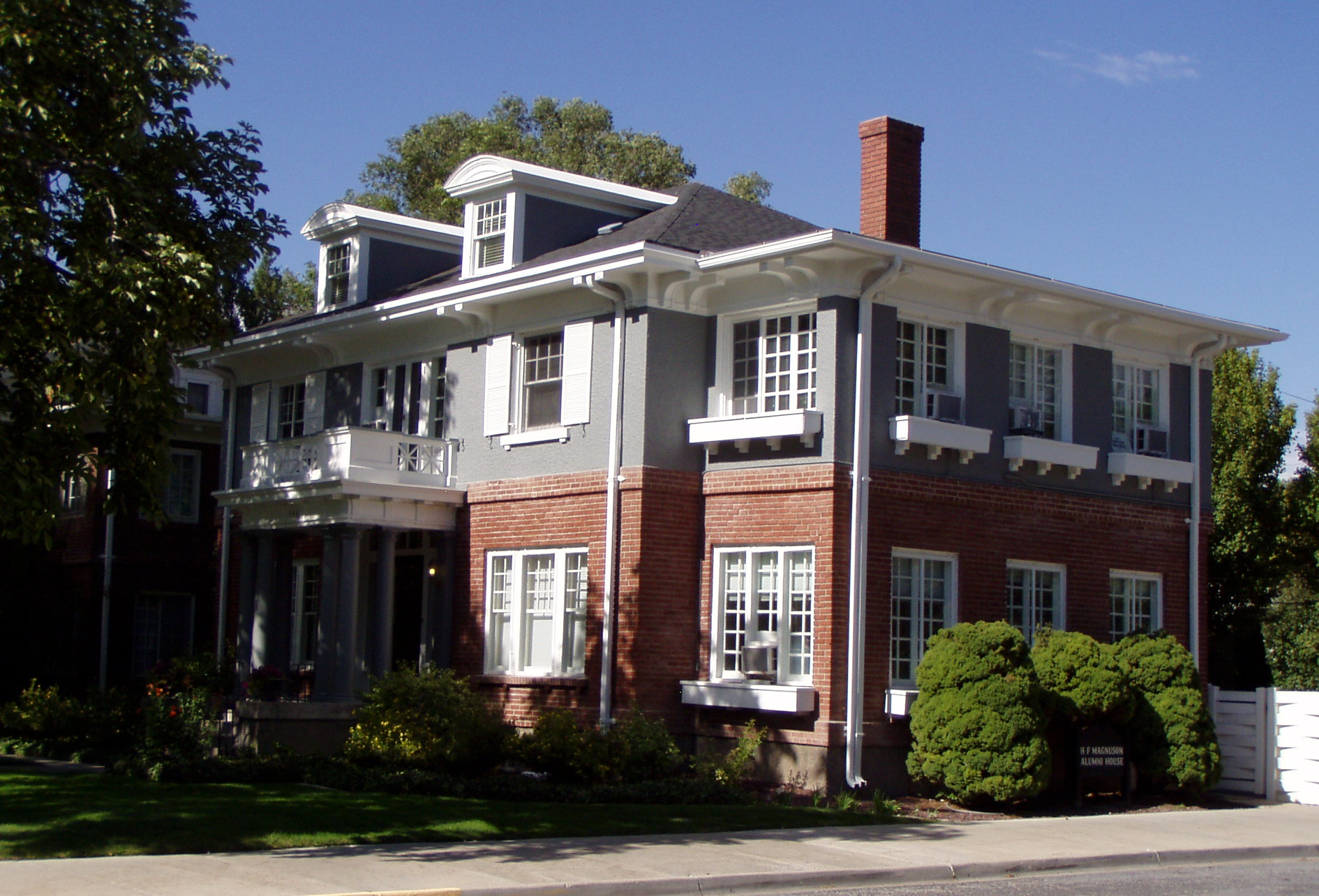

- Location within Idaho Location within the United States
- Location: 554 S. 7th Ave., Pocatello, Idaho
- Coordinates: 42°51′58″N 112°26′17″W
- Area: less than one acre
- Built: 1916
- Architect: Palmer Rogers
- Architectural style: Colonial Revival, Italianate, Federal
- NRHP reference No.: 78001043
- Added to NRHP: December 14, 1978

The John Hood House, at 554 S. 7th Ave. in Pocatello, Idaho, was built in 1916. It was listed on the National Register of Historic Places in 1978. The house was designed by local architect Palmer Rogers.

Its design reflects Colonial Revival style its doorways and windows, and in its one-story portico with groups of three Doric columns and with a balcony above. It reflects Italianate style in its low roof with wide cornices supported by pairs of decorative brackets. It has Federal features inside.

It was built for John Hood, who "was a merchant whose business operations primarily consisted of the Golden Rule Store chain in Idaho and Utah. As a young man in Wyoming, Hood was a co-worker of J.C. Penney, and ultimately he sold his eleven stores to Penney in 1927, upholding an agreement the pair had made while contemplating future successes in Wyoming." The Hood family retained possession of the house until 1977."
