= St. Joseph's Catholic Church (Pocatello, Idaho) =

Historic church in Idaho, United States

- U.S. National Register of Historic Places
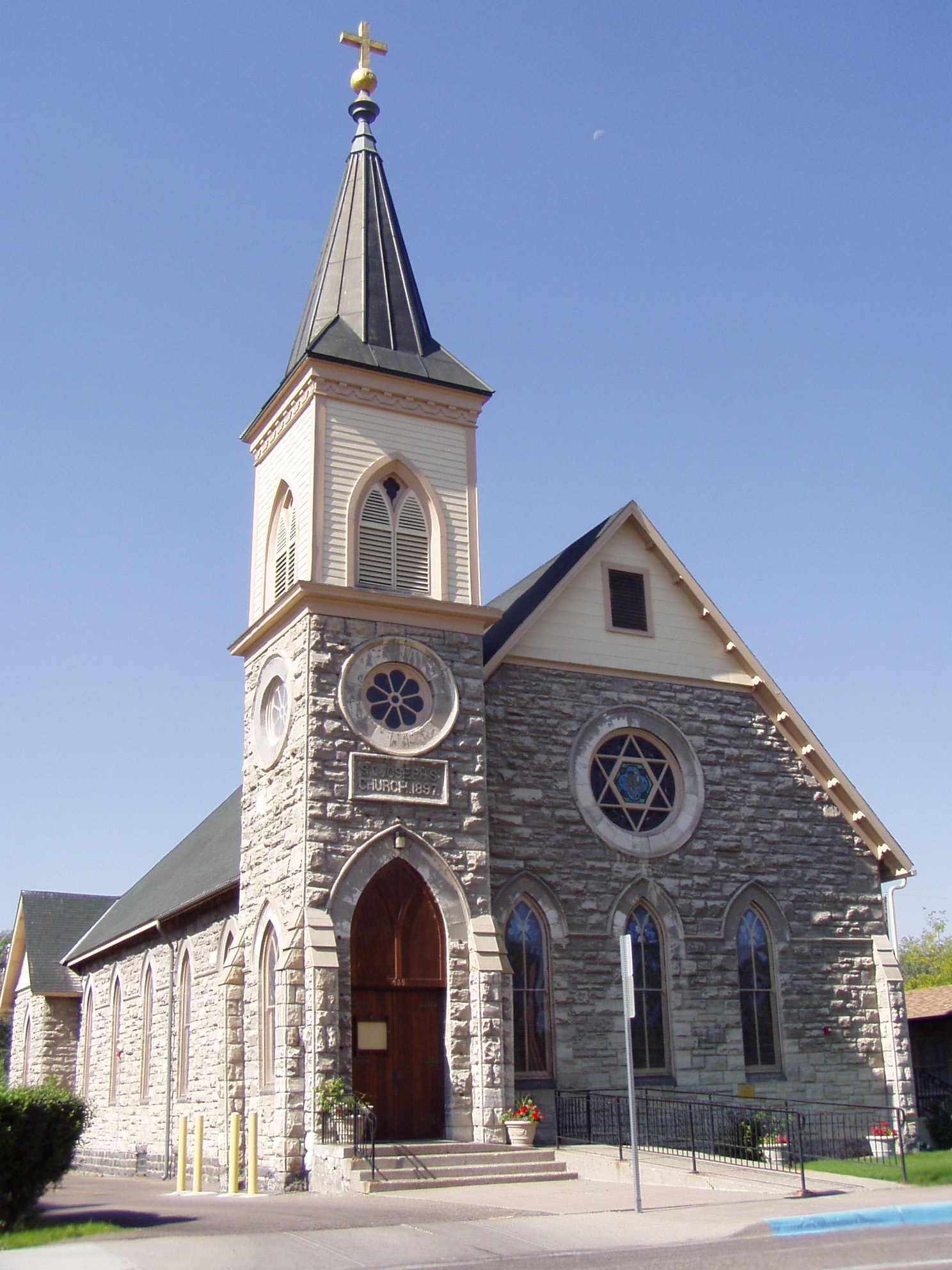

- Location within Idaho Location within the United States
- Location: 455 N. Hayes, Pocatello, Idaho
- Coordinates: 42°51′46″N 112°27′23″W
- Area: less than one acre
- Built: 1897
- Architectural style: Late Gothic Revival
- NRHP reference No.: 78001044
- Added to NRHP: August 29, 1978

The St. Joseph's Catholic Church is a chapel and former parish in the "Old Town" of Pocatello, Idaho. Built in 1897, it is Pocatello's oldest surviving church and was deemed significant "a rare nineteenth century example" of an Idaho church built of stone. The church was added to the National Register of Historic Places in 1978.

An apostolic vicariate based in Boise was established in the 1860s. The first church of St. Joseph was built at the 100 block of South Garfield in 1889 but swiftly outgrown; the current campus of the church and convent were purchased in 1891, with the original church used for the parochial school.

The parish was merged with the parish of St. Paul in Chubbuck and St. Anthony of Padua in Pocatello to form the Holy Spirit Catholic Community.

The Trinity Episcopal Church, also in Pocatello and NRHP-listed, is another historic stone Idaho church, built later. Its stone came from the stone quarry at Fort Hall, nearby.
