= A.F.R. Building =

- A. F. R. Building
- U.S. National Register of Historic Places
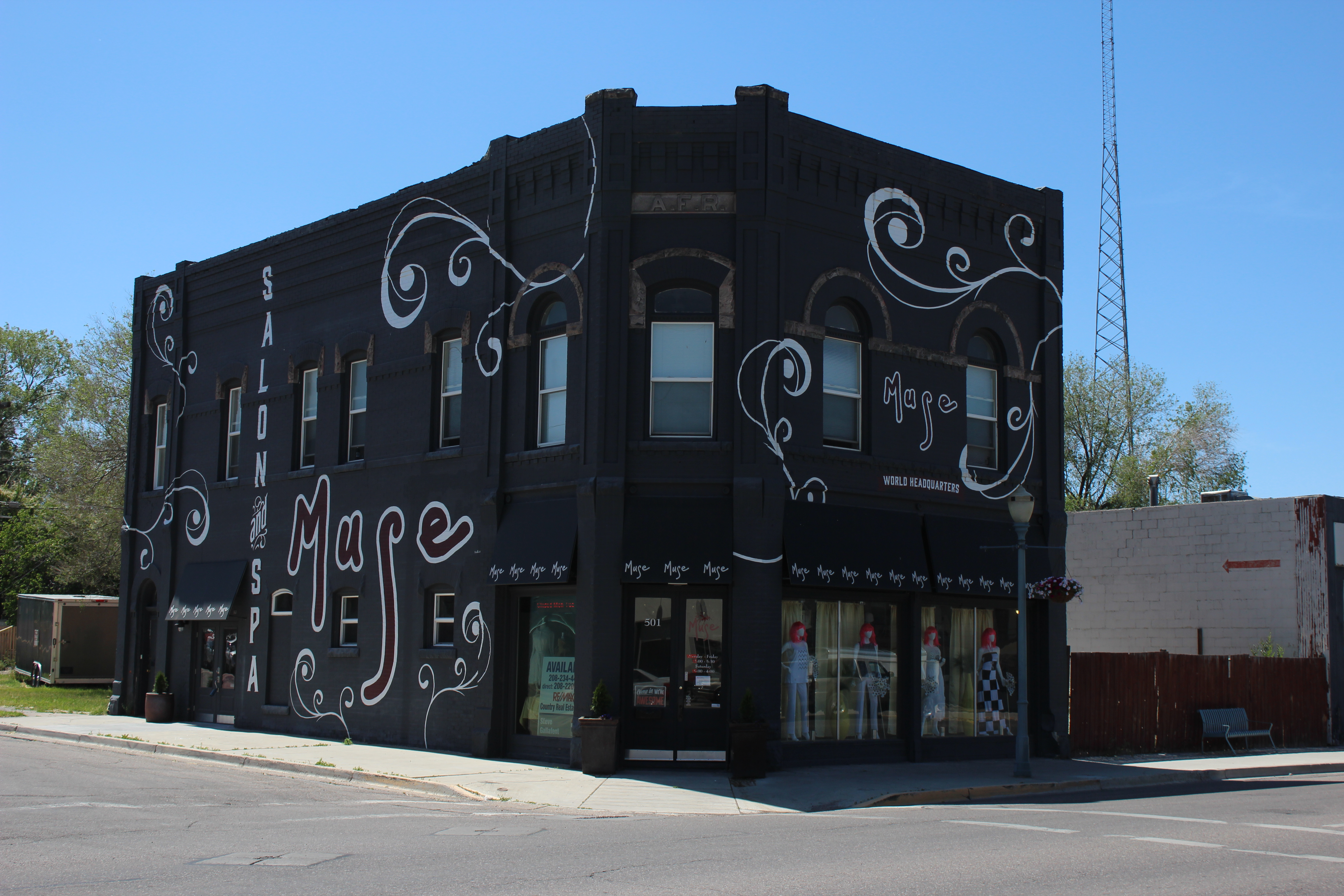

- Location within Idaho Location within the United States
- Location: 501 N. Main St., Pocatello, Idaho
- Coordinates: 42°51′55″N 112°27′13″W
- Area: less than one acre
- Built: 1903
- Architectural style: Renaissance, Romanesque
- NRHP reference No.: 90001737
- Added to NRHP: November 15, 1990

The A. F. R. Building, located at 501 N. Main St. in Pocatello, Idaho, was built in 1903. Also known as the Roulet Block, it was listed on the National Register of Historic Places in 1990.

It is a two-story building which is rectangular in plan except for a cutaway corner entrance at the corner of Main St. and Wyeth St. It was deemed significant as "one of Pocatello's few commercial structures—and certainly one of the most intact structures—from the early-twentieth century period."
