= Don Aslett =

American businessman and author (1935–2024)

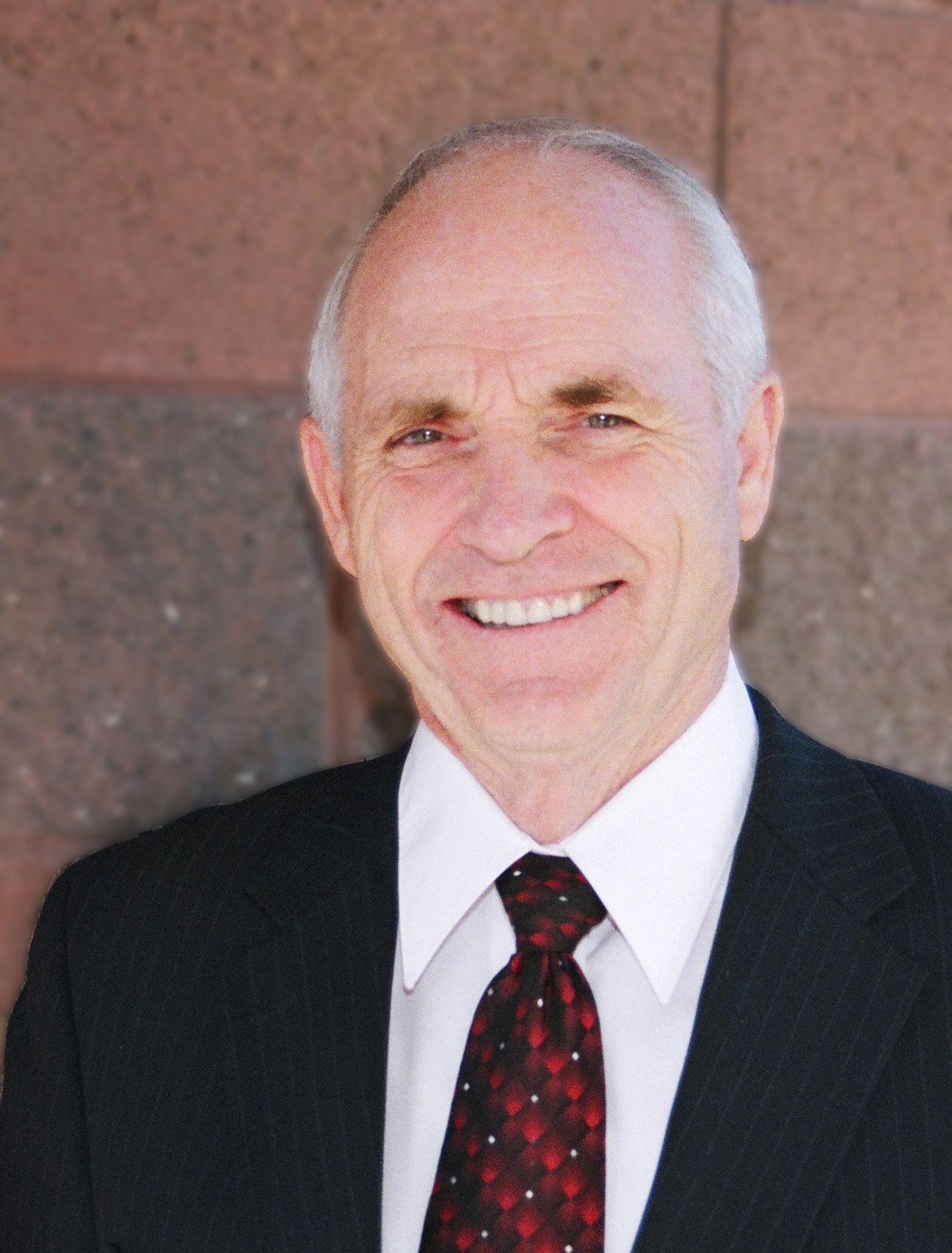
- Aslett in 2011
- Born: Donald Andrew Aslett; July 23, 1935
- Died: August 21, 2024 (aged 89)
- Occupations: Businessman; author
- Website: donaslett.com

Donald Andrew Aslett (July 23, 1935 – August 21, 2024) was an American businessman, author, and expert in cleaning and housekeeping. He co-founded Varsity House Cleaning Company in 1957, which later evolved into Varsity Facility Services, a major building service contractor. Aslett authored numerous books on cleaning and organization, advocating for efficient, clutter-free living. He also founded the Museum of Clean in Pocatello, Idaho, which showcases a vast collection of cleaning artifacts and promotes environmentally friendly practices. His contributions earned him recognition, including induction into the Idaho Hall of Fame.

== Background ==
Donald Aslett was born on July 23, 1935. He was raised in Twin Falls, Idaho, and grew up in Dietrich, Idaho, about 34 miles (55 km) away. Aslett served a mission for The Church of Jesus Christ of Latter-day Saints in Hawaii. Around 1957, he married Barbara and started his cleaning business. The couple had six children, and while they were growing up, he was a scoutmaster. The Asletts owned a ranch in McCammon, Idaho, about 25 miles (40 km) from Pocatello, and a house in Hawaii, which was designed for energy conservation and low maintenance. The house was photographed by the U.S. Army to study ways to create easy-to-maintain housing and barracks.

Aslett was a devout member of The Church of Jesus Christ of Latter-day Saints, and served as a bishop in the Marsh Creek Ward of the McCammon Idaho Stake. He was also a member of the Idaho State University Museum board.

Aslett died on August 21, 2024, at the age of 89.

== Career ==
=== Varsity Facility Services ===
While studying at Idaho State College, Aslett co-founded Varsity House Cleaning Company in 1957 with Arlo Luke in Pocatello, Idaho, to help pay his college tuition. Aslett described himself as the "crazy entrepreneur" and Luke as the "strong facilitator." The business grew to employ 30 to 50 people, with Mountain State Telephone and Telegraph as one of their early clients. The company, later renamed Varsity Contractors, expanded to employ 500 people across three states, offering janitorial, facilities services, construction, and landscaping services.

Aslett received a Bachelor of Arts degree in Physical Education from Idaho State in 1963. The company continued to grow, and by 1990, it had 2,500 employees and operated in 14 states. Varsity Contractors was generating total revenues of $190 million by 2006.

Arlo Luke, who had been the president and CEO for 28 years, stepped down in 2011, and by 2013, Aslett was no longer involved in the daily management of the company. The company was renamed Varsity Facility Services in 2011, with Arlo's son Eric taking over as president and CEO. By 2013, the company employed 4,000 people, had offices in all 50 states and Canada, and sold green products in six states. Varsity Facility Services is headquartered in Salt Lake City, Utah.

Aslett was inducted into Idaho's Hall of Fame in 2010.

=== Author ===
Aslett authored 40 books on cleaning and organization, with publications in 10 languages. He advocated reducing cleaning time by 75% through decluttering, using appropriate tools, and designing homes with low-maintenance features. Aslett emphasized personal responsibility for cleanliness, stating, "even if President Bush stayed at my house, he'd know where the vacuum is." He earned nicknames like the Sultan of Shine and the Dean of Clean.

=== Museum of Clean ===
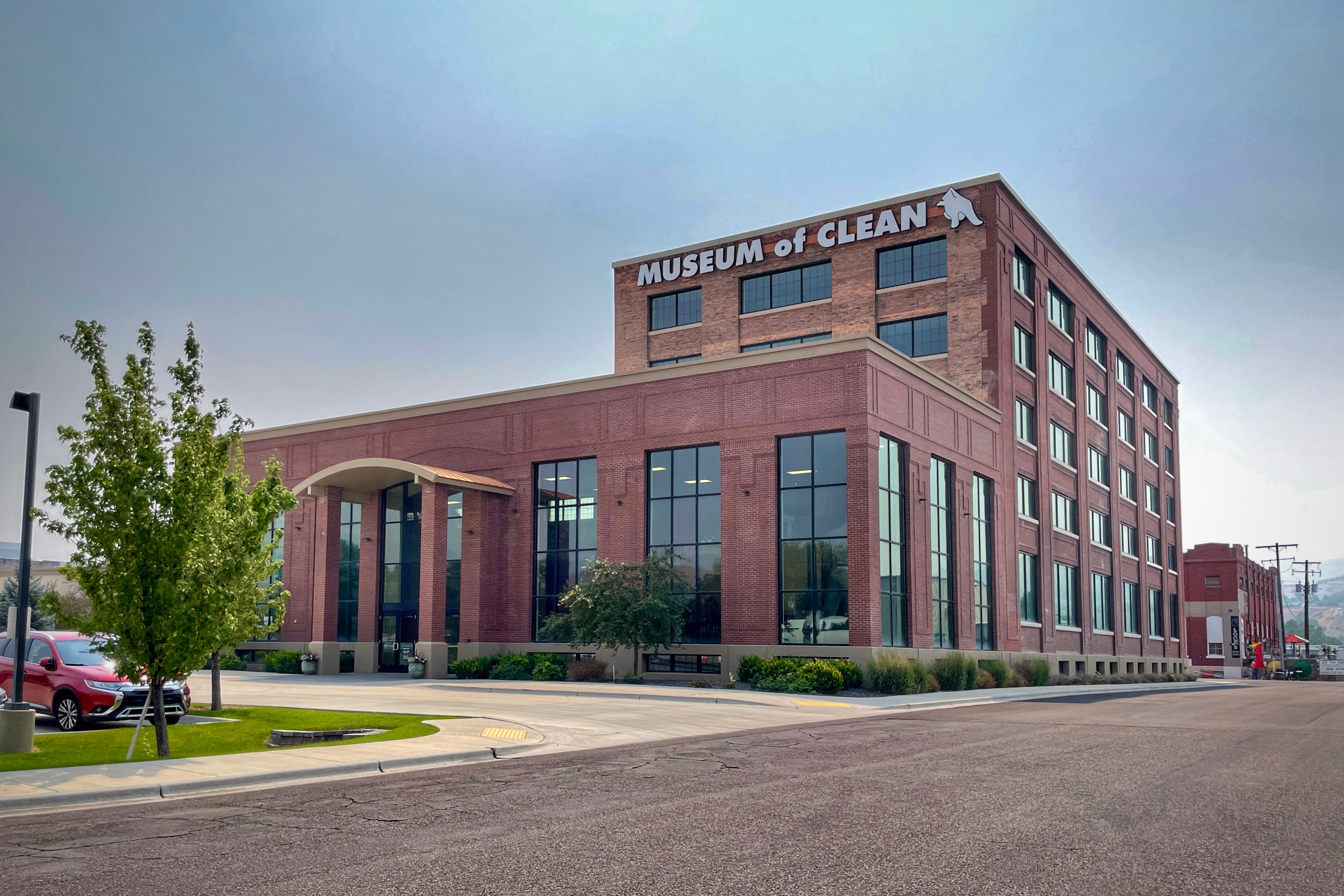
Museum of Clean

In November 2011, Aslett opened the Museum of Clean in a six-story building in Pocatello, Idaho, originally a warehouse built in 1915. The museum includes an art gallery, an 88-seat theater, and a gift shop, and houses 6,000 historical artifacts related to cleanliness, such as a 1902 horse-drawn vacuum cleaner and a 1,600-year-old bronze toothpick. Interactive exhibits teach children about recycling and cleaning. The museum cost $6 million to establish and took six years to assemble its collection.

Aslett emphasized that the museum is about the concept of "clean" rather than just cleaning tools. He believed decluttering and eliminating excess lead to a healthier, more positive lifestyle. The museum's environmentally friendly renovation included recycling 80% of the materials removed, installing energy-efficient windows and lighting, and implementing a rainwater collection system. These modifications reduced the building's electric bill by 25%. In 2013, Aslett received the Pollution Prevention Champion Award from the Idaho Department of Environmental Quality for his efforts.

=== Other ===
By the mid-1990s, Aslett had made around 5,000 television appearances, including on shows like The Oprah Winfrey Show, where he discussed cleaning. To engage his audience, Aslett added an entertaining flair to his presentations, covering topics such as "Make Your House Do the Housework" and "Clean in a Minute."
