= University Park Historic District (Buffalo, New York) =

Historic district in New York, United States

- U.S. National Register of Historic Places
- U.S. Historic district
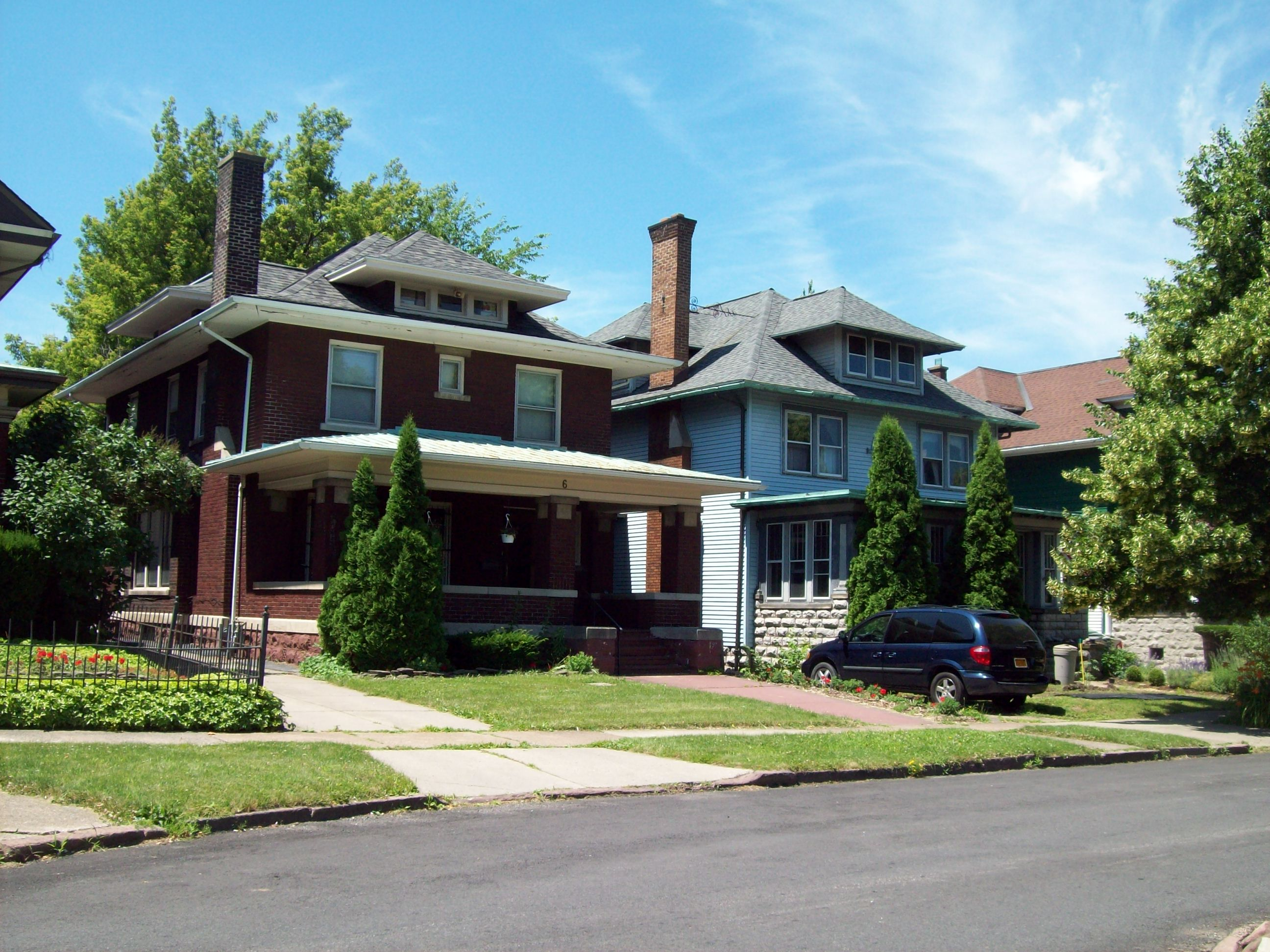
- University Park Historic District, July 2011

- Location within New York Location within the United States
- Location: Portions of Larchmont Rd., Niagara Falls Blvd., Radcliffe Rd., University Ave., Allenhurst Rd., Pellhan Dr, Buffalo, New York
- Coordinates: 42°57′24″N 78°49′30″W
- Area: 45.21 acres (18.30 ha)
- Built by: Matthews-Northrup Works and Huck, Anthony J.
- NRHP reference No.: 11000273
- Added to NRHP: May 11, 2011

University Park Historic District is a national historic district located in the University Heights neighborhood of Buffalo in Erie County, New York. It has 489 contributing buildings, 1 contributing site, and 4 contributing structures adjacent to the south campus of the University at Buffalo. The district is exclusively residential, with homes built starting in 1913. The home are in popular architectural styles from the inter-war period including American Foursquare, American Craftsmanm Bungalow, and Colonial Revival. The contributing site is the overall design and layout of the subdivision and the contributing structures are distinctive entry gates to the community. Located in the district is the separately listed Edward A. Diebolt House.

It was listed on the National Register of Historic Places in 2011.
