= Idaho State University Neighborhood Historic District =

Historic district in Idaho, United States

- U.S. National Register of Historic Places
- Location within Idaho Location within the United States
- Location: Roughly bounded by 6th, 9th, Carter, and Center Sts., Pocatello, Idaho
- Coordinates: 42°51′57″N 112°26′15″W
- Area: 51 acres (21 ha)
- Built: c.1900 - c.1942
- Architectural style: Colonial Revival, Bungalow/craftsman, English Cottage
- NRHP reference No.: 84001008
- Added to NRHP: September 7, 1984

The Idaho State University Neighborhood Historic District in Pocatello, Idaho is a historic district which was listed on the National Register of Historic Places in 1984.

The district included 317 contributing buildings and a contributing site on 51 acres (21 ha). It is roughly bounded by 6th, 9th, Carter, and Center Streets in Pocatello.
