= Peery Hotel =

Historic building in Salt Lake City, Utah, U.S.

- U.S. National Register of Historic Places
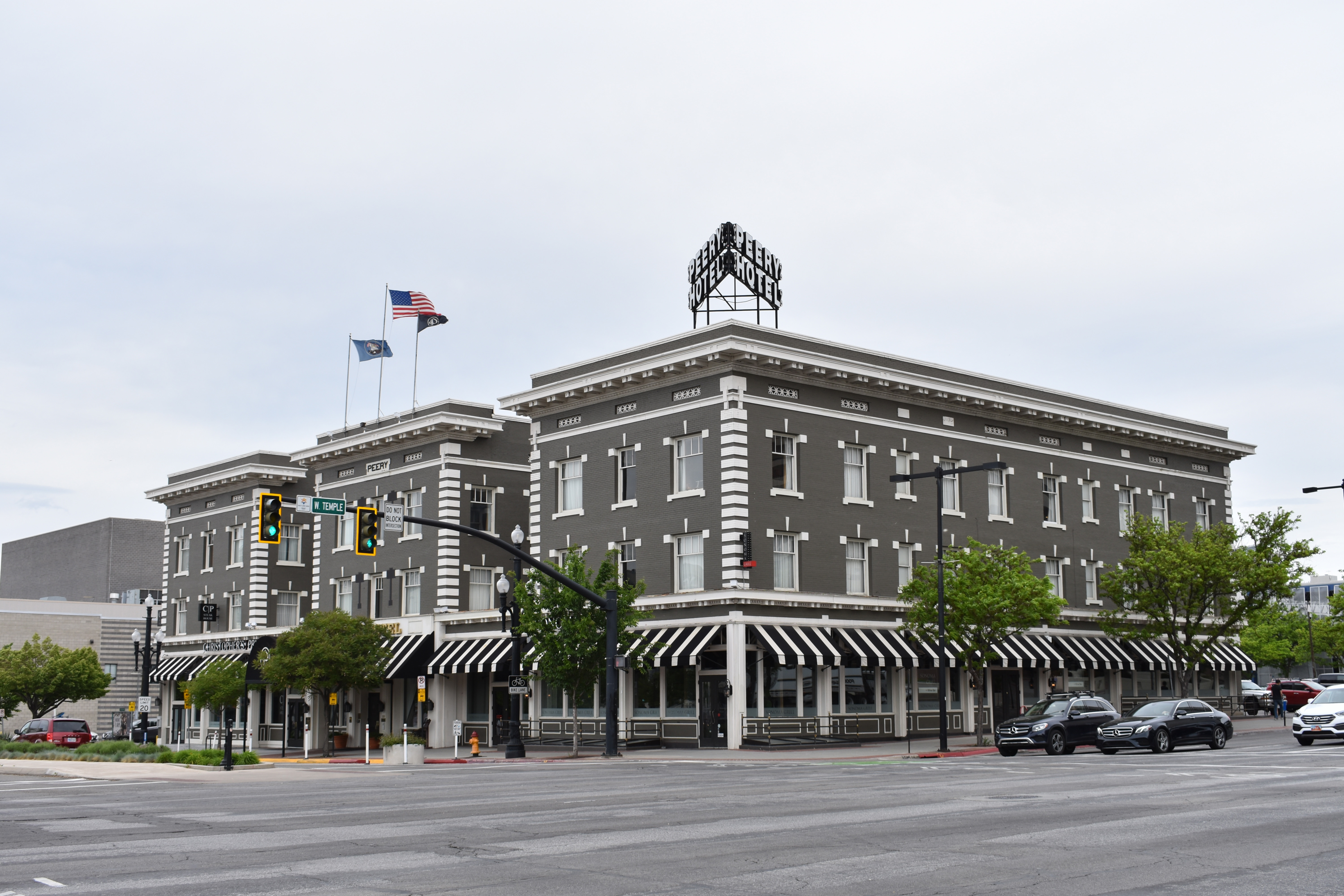
- The Peery Hotel in 2019

- Location within Utah Location within the United States
- Location: 270--280 S. West Temple, 102--120 W. 300 South, Salt Lake City, Utah
- Coordinates: 40°45′47″N 111°53′36″W
- Area: less than one acre
- Built: 1910
- Architect: Onderdonk, Charles B., Goodfellow, Irving
- Architectural style: Classical Revival, Prairie School
- NRHP reference No.: 78002679
- Added to NRHP: February 17, 1978

The Peery Hotel in Salt Lake City, Utah, is a 3-story Prairie style building that incorporates Classical Revival design elements. The hotel was designed by Charles B. Onderdonk and Irving Goodfellow and constructed in 1910 in what is now the city's Warehouse District. It was added to the National Register of Historic Places in 1978.

The Peery Hotel was constructed at a time of rapid growth in Salt Lake City, and its location was close to the new commercial center, including what is now the Exchange Place Historic District. The Denver and Rio Grande Depot and the Salt Lake City Union Pacific Depot were constructed about the same time as the Peery Hotel. The hotel was financed by members of the David Harold Peery family with funds from the Peery Estate. David Henry Peery, heir and oldest son of Harold Peery, had planned a smaller hotel for the site in 1907, but construction stopped prior to his death later that year. New hotel plans were drawn in 1909, and the Peery Hotel opened in 1910 under the direction of Peery's mother, Elizabeth Peery.

Harry K. Miles leased the hotel in 1925, and in 1947 he purchased the property and named it the Miles Hotel.
