= Trinity Episcopal Church (Pocatello, Idaho) =

Historic church in Idaho, United States

- U.S. National Register of Historic Places
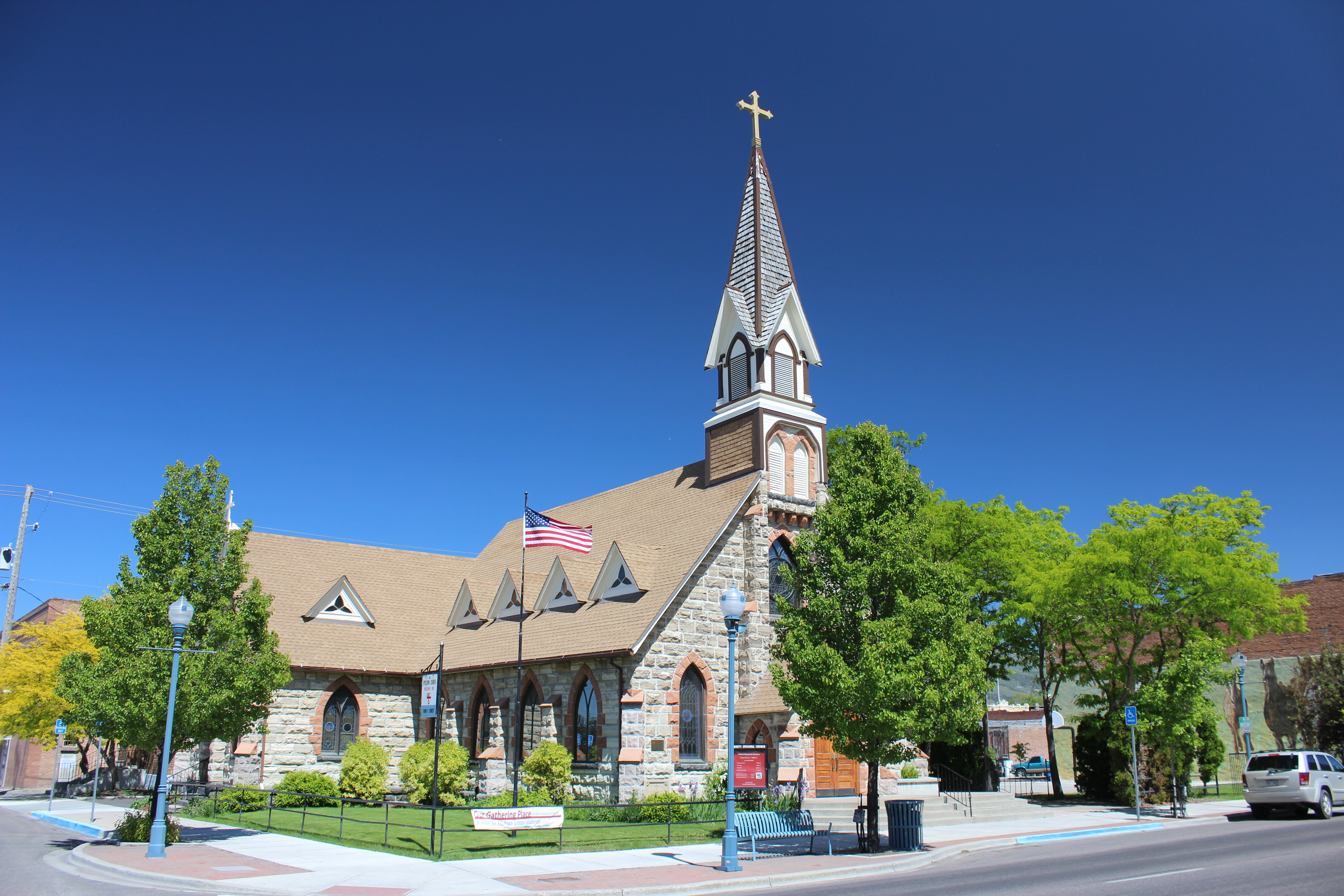

- Location within Idaho Location within the United States
- Location: 248 N. Arthur St., Pocatello, Idaho
- Coordinates: 42°51′47″N 112°27′8″W
- Area: less than one acre
- Built: 1897-1898
- Built by: Mooney & Johnson
- Architect: W.Y. Van Winkle
- Architectural style: Gothic
- NRHP reference No.: 78001045
- Added to NRHP: February 17, 1978

The Trinity Episcopal Church at 248 N. Arthur Street in Pocatello, Idaho was built in 1897–1898, after the St. Joseph's Catholic Church. The two churches are rare as stone churches in Idaho, and are both Gothic. It was added to the National Register in 1978. It has an L-shaped plan and stained glass windows from Wells Brothers in Chicago. It has a 92 feet (28 m)-tall clapboard bell tower with spire. It was designed by architect W. Y. Van Winkle of Hailey, reportedly designed after an English parish church in Lancashire, England.

The congregation is part of the Episcopal Diocese of Idaho. In 2015, the church reported 158 members; in 2023, it reported 68 members. No membership statistics were reported in 2024 national parochial reports. Plate and pledge financial support reported by the church in 2024 was $110,999. Average Sunday Attendance (ASA) reported in 2024 was 34 persons. This was a relative decrease on ASA of 56 reported in 2015.
