= Pocatello, Idaho =

City in the United States

Pocatello
- City
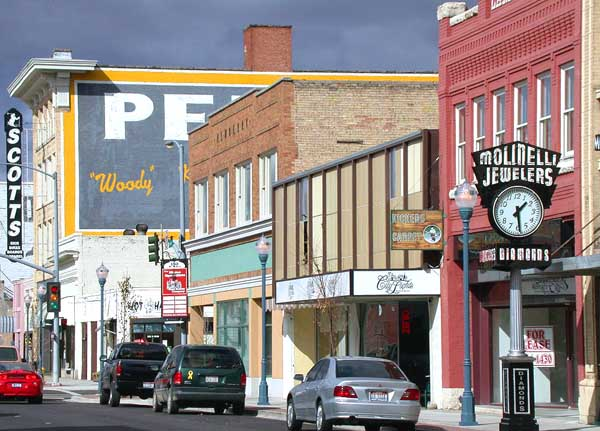
- Downtown Pocatello, 2004

- Flag Logo
- Nicknames: "Poky", "U.S. Smile Capital", "The Gate City"
- Motto: "Gateway to the Northwest"
- Location of Pocatello in Bannock County and Power County, Idaho.

- Location in the United States Location in Idaho
- Coordinates: 42°51′44″N 112°27′02″W
- Country: United States
- State: Idaho
- Counties: Bannock, Power
- Established: 1889

Government
  - Mayor: Mark Dahlquist

Area
  - Total: 33.40 sq mi (86.50 km^{2})
  - Land: 33.24 sq mi (86.09 km^{2})
  - Water: 0.16 sq mi (0.41 km^{2})
- Elevation: 4,462 ft (1,360 m)

Population (2020)
  - Total: 56,320
  - Density: 1,688.1/sq mi (651.78/km^{2})
- Time zone: UTC−7 (Mountain Standard Time (MST))
  - Summer (DST): UTC−6 (Mountain Daylight Time (MDT))
- ZIP Codes: 83201, 83204–83206, 83209
- Area codes: 208, 986
- FIPS code: 16-64090
- GNIS feature ID: 2411447
- Website: pocatello.gov

Pocatello (/poʊkəˈtɛloʊ/) is the county seat of and the largest city in Bannock County, with a small portion on the Fort Hall Indian Reservation in neighboring Power County, containing the city's airport. It is the principal city of the Pocatello metropolitan area, which encompasses all of Bannock County in the southeastern part of the U.S. state of Idaho.

As of the 2020 census, the population of Pocatello was 56,320. Pocatello is the 6th most populous city in the state, just behind Caldwell.

The city is at an elevation of 4,462 feet (1,360 m) above sea level and it sits on the Portneuf River in the Snake River Plain ecoregion. Pocatello covers a land area of 33.36 square miles (86.4 square kilometers).

Pocatello is the home of Idaho State University and the manufacturing facilities of Amy's Kitchen and ON Semiconductor Corporation; it is served by the Pocatello Regional Airport.

== History ==
=== Indigenous tribes ===
Shoshone and Bannock Indigenous tribes inhabited southeastern Idaho for hundreds of years before the Lewis and Clark Expedition across Idaho in 1805. The expedition's reports of the many riches of the region attracted fur trappers and traders to southeastern Idaho. The city is named after Chief Pocatello, a 19th-century Northern Shoshone leader.

=== Permanent settlements ===
Nathaniel Wyeth of Massachusetts established one of the first permanent settlements at Fort Hall in 1834, which is only a few miles northeast of Pocatello. When over-trapping and a shift in fashion to silk hats put an end to the fur trade, Fort Hall became a supply point for immigrants traveling the Oregon Trail.

Although thousands of immigrants passed through Idaho, it was not until the discovery of gold in 1860 that Idaho attracted settlers in large numbers. The gold rush brought a need for goods and services to many towns, and the Portneuf Valley, home of Pocatello, was the corridor initially used by stage and freight lines. The coming of the railroad provided further development of Idaho's mineral resources and "Pocatello junction" became an important transportation crossroads as the Union Pacific Railroad expanded its service.

=== Gate City ===
After its founding in 1889, Pocatello became known as the "Gate City" for being a gateway to Idaho and the Pacific Northwest. As pioneers, gold miners and settlers traveled the Oregon Trail, they passed through the Portneuf Gap south of town. Stage and freight lines and the railroad soon followed, turning the community into a trade center and transportation junction.

=== Gold rush and agriculture ===
After the gold rush played out, the settlers who remained turned to agriculture. With the help of irrigation from the nearby Snake River, the region became a large supplier of potatoes, grain and other crops. Residential and commercial development gradually appeared by 1882.

=== Alameda consolidation ===
The adjacent city of Alameda was consolidated into Pocatello in 1962, Chubbuck, further north, opposed a similar merger and remained a separate municipality. In the 1960 census, Alameda had a population of 10,660 and Pocatello was at 28,534; the consolidation made Pocatello the state's largest city based on those numbers, passing Boise and Idaho Falls.

=== Flag ===
The Pocatello flag used from 2001 to 2017 was considered by the North American

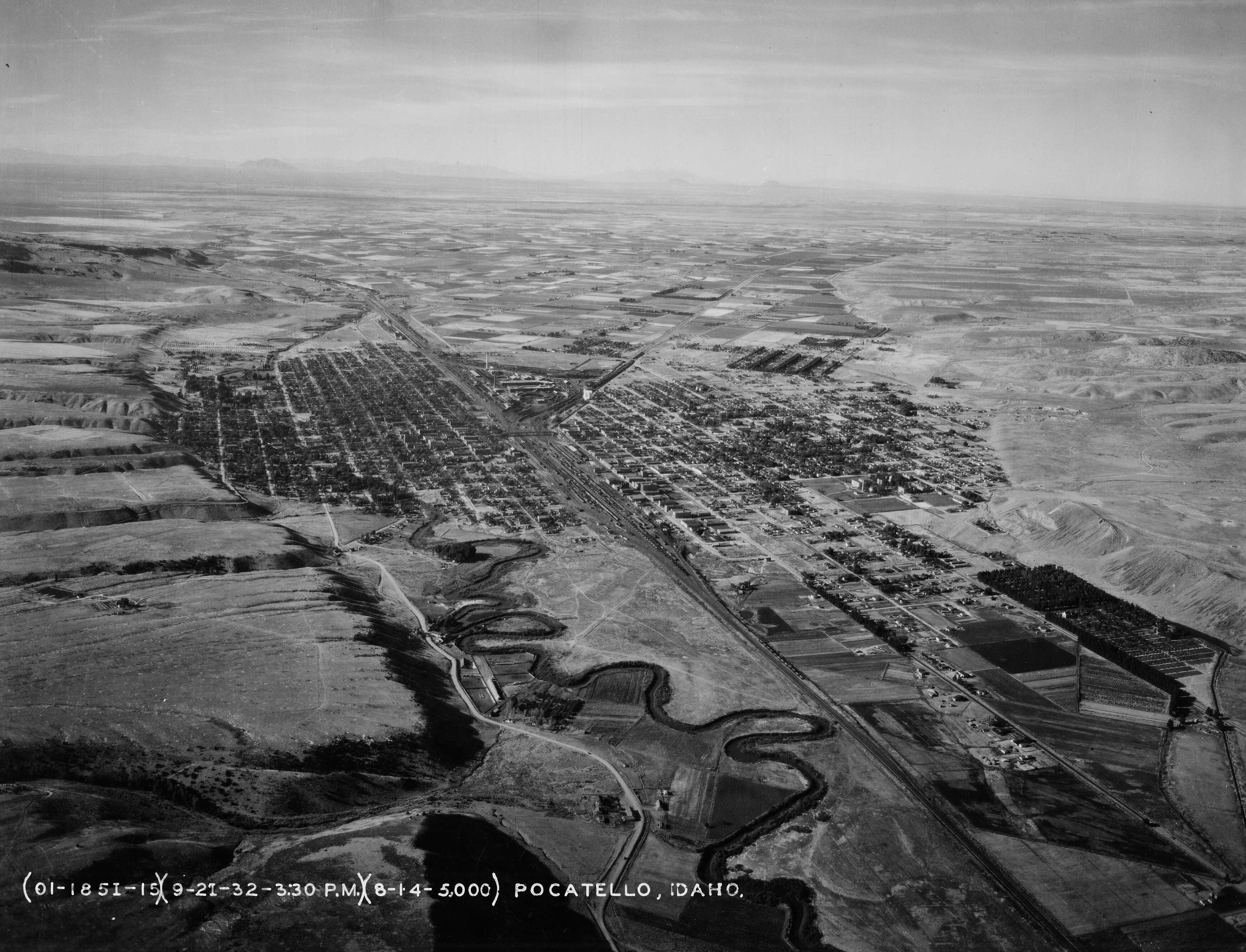
View of Pocatello, 1932

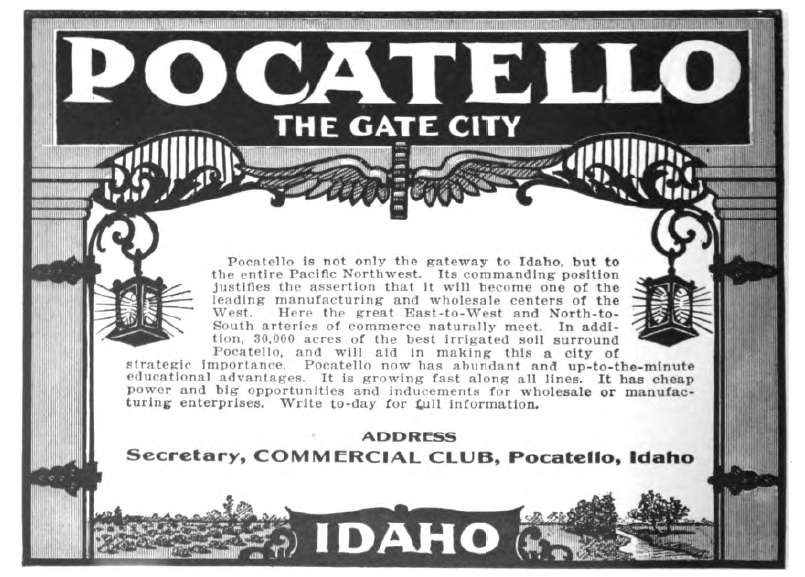
Advertisement of Pocatello for homesteaders in the Sunset Travel Bureau of Information, April 1910.

Vexillological Association to be the worst city flag in North America. After a 2015 TED Talk by Roman Mars made Pocatello's flag infamous, the city's newly created flag design committee met for the first time in April 2016, with Mars in attendance. On July 20, 2017, after a year and a half of work by the flag committee, the Pocatello City Council approved the adoption of a new flag with the informal name of "Mountains Left" out of a total of 709 designs.

== Geography ==
According to the United States Census Bureau, the city has a total area of 33.36 square miles (86.40 km^{2}), of which 32.22 square miles (83.45 km^{2}) is land and 0.16 square miles (0.41 km^{2}) is water.

A main water feature of Pocatello is the Portneuf River, which runs southeast to northwest on the western side of the city. Since 1992, the city and the Portneuf Greenway Foundation have worked to create a system of trails that follow the river and connect to other trails in the greater Portneuf Valley. Currently, 15+ miles of trails have been constructed with 27 planned total miles.

=== Climate ===
According to the Köppen Climate Classification system, Pocatello has a (Cold semi-arid) continental climate, abbreviated "BSk" on climate maps. The hottest temperature recorded in Pocatello was 104 °F (40 °C) on August 2, 1969, August 8, 1990, July 22, 2000, and July 31, 2020, while the coldest temperature recorded was −33 °F (−36 °C) on February 1, 1985.

Climate data for Pocatello, Idaho (Pocatello Regional Airport), 1991–2020 normals, extremes 1939–present
Month	Jan	Feb	Mar	Apr	May	Jun	Jul	Aug	Sep	Oct	Nov	Dec	Year
Record high °F (°C)	61 (16)	65 (18)	75 (24)	86 (30)	97 (36)	103 (39)	104 (40)	104 (40)	102 (39)	91 (33)	75 (24)	64 (18)	104 (40)
Mean maximum °F (°C)	48.8 (9.3)	53.3 (11.8)	66.8 (19.3)	77.1 (25.1)	86.2 (30.1)	93.9 (34.4)	99.6 (37.6)	98.6 (37.0)	92.2 (33.4)	80.6 (27.0)	64.0 (17.8)	51.6 (10.9)	100.2 (37.9)
Mean daily maximum °F (°C)	34.2 (1.2)	39.0 (3.9)	50.5 (10.3)	58.6 (14.8)	68.7 (20.4)	78.5 (25.8)	89.3 (31.8)	88.1 (31.2)	77.2 (25.1)	61.5 (16.4)	46.1 (7.8)	34.3 (1.3)	60.5 (15.8)
Daily mean °F (°C)	25.6 (−3.6)	29.7 (−1.3)	39.1 (3.9)	45.7 (7.6)	54.2 (12.3)	62.2 (16.8)	70.8 (21.6)	69.3 (20.7)	59.7 (15.4)	47.1 (8.4)	34.9 (1.6)	25.8 (−3.4)	47.0 (8.3)
Mean daily minimum °F (°C)	17.1 (−8.3)	20.3 (−6.5)	27.8 (−2.3)	32.8 (0.4)	39.7 (4.3)	46.0 (7.8)	52.3 (11.3)	50.5 (10.3)	42.2 (5.7)	32.8 (0.4)	23.8 (−4.6)	17.3 (−8.2)	33.6 (0.9)
Mean minimum °F (°C)	−3.5 (−19.7)	0.8 (−17.3)	12.6 (−10.8)	20.0 (−6.7)	26.1 (−3.3)	34.0 (1.1)	41.2 (5.1)	38.5 (3.6)	28.7 (−1.8)	17.0 (−8.3)	5.4 (−14.8)	−3.4 (−19.7)	−9.6 (−23.1)
Record low °F (°C)	−31 (−35)	−33 (−36)	−12 (−24)	12 (−11)	20 (−7)	28 (−2)	34 (1)	30 (−1)	19 (−7)	−6 (−21)	−14 (−26)	−29 (−34)	−33 (−36)
Average precipitation inches (mm)	1.11 (28)	0.97 (25)	1.21 (31)	1.20 (30)	1.40 (36)	0.93 (24)	0.51 (13)	0.53 (13)	0.89 (23)	0.99 (25)	0.95 (24)	1.13 (29)	11.82 (301)
Average snowfall inches (cm)	8.5 (22)	7.6 (19)	4.1 (10)	2.6 (6.6)	0.4 (1.0)	0.0 (0.0)	0.0 (0.0)	0.0 (0.0)	0.0 (0.0)	1.2 (3.0)	4.0 (10)	10.1 (26)	38.5 (97.6)
Average precipitation days (≥ 0.01 in)	10.5	9.1	9.4	9.6	9.2	6.1	4.1	4.4	5.0	6.4	8.0	10.9	92.7
Average snowy days (≥ 0.1 in)	8.6	6.6	4.1	2.6	0.3	0.0	0.0	0.0	0.0	0.9	3.9	9.2	36.2
Source 1: NOAA
Source 2: National Weather Service

== Demographics ==
Historical population
Census	Pop.	Note	%±
1900	4,046		—
1910	9,110		125.2%
1920	15,001		64.7%
1930	16,471		9.8%
1940	18,133		10.1%
1950	26,131		44.1%
1960	26,534		1.5%
1970	40,036		50.9%
1980	46,340		15.7%
1990	46,080		−0.6%
2000	51,466		11.7%
2010	54,255		5.4%
2020	56,320		3.8%
2025 (est.)	58,771		4.4%
U.S. Decennial Census; Alameda annexed in 1962.

=== 2020 census ===
As of the 2020 census, Pocatello had a population of 56,320. The median age was 33.4 years. 24.9% of residents were under the age of 18 and 14.4% of residents were 65 years of age or older. For every 100 females there were 97.9 males, and for every 100 females age 18 and over there were 95.6 males age 18 and over.

99.0% of residents lived in urban areas, while 1.0% lived in rural areas.

There were 21,651 households in Pocatello, of which 31.3% had children under the age of 18 living in them. Of all households, 44.4% were married-couple households, 20.9% were households with a male householder and no spouse or partner present, and 26.3% were households with a female householder and no spouse or partner present. About 29.5% of all households were made up of individuals and 10.1% had someone living alone who was 65 years of age or older.

There were 23,290 housing units, of which 7.0% were vacant. The homeowner vacancy rate was 1.6% and the rental vacancy rate was 8.5%.

Racial composition as of the 2020 census
Race	Number	Percent
White	47,097	83.6%
Black or African American	654	1.2%
American Indian and Alaska Native	1,221	2.2%
Asian	974	1.7%
Native Hawaiian and Other Pacific Islander	204	0.4%
Some other race	2,084	3.7%
Two or more races	4,086	7.3%
Hispanic or Latino (of any race)	5,805	10.3%

=== 2022 American Community Survey estimates ===
As of the 2022 American Community Survey estimates, there were 56,582 people and 21,657 households. The population

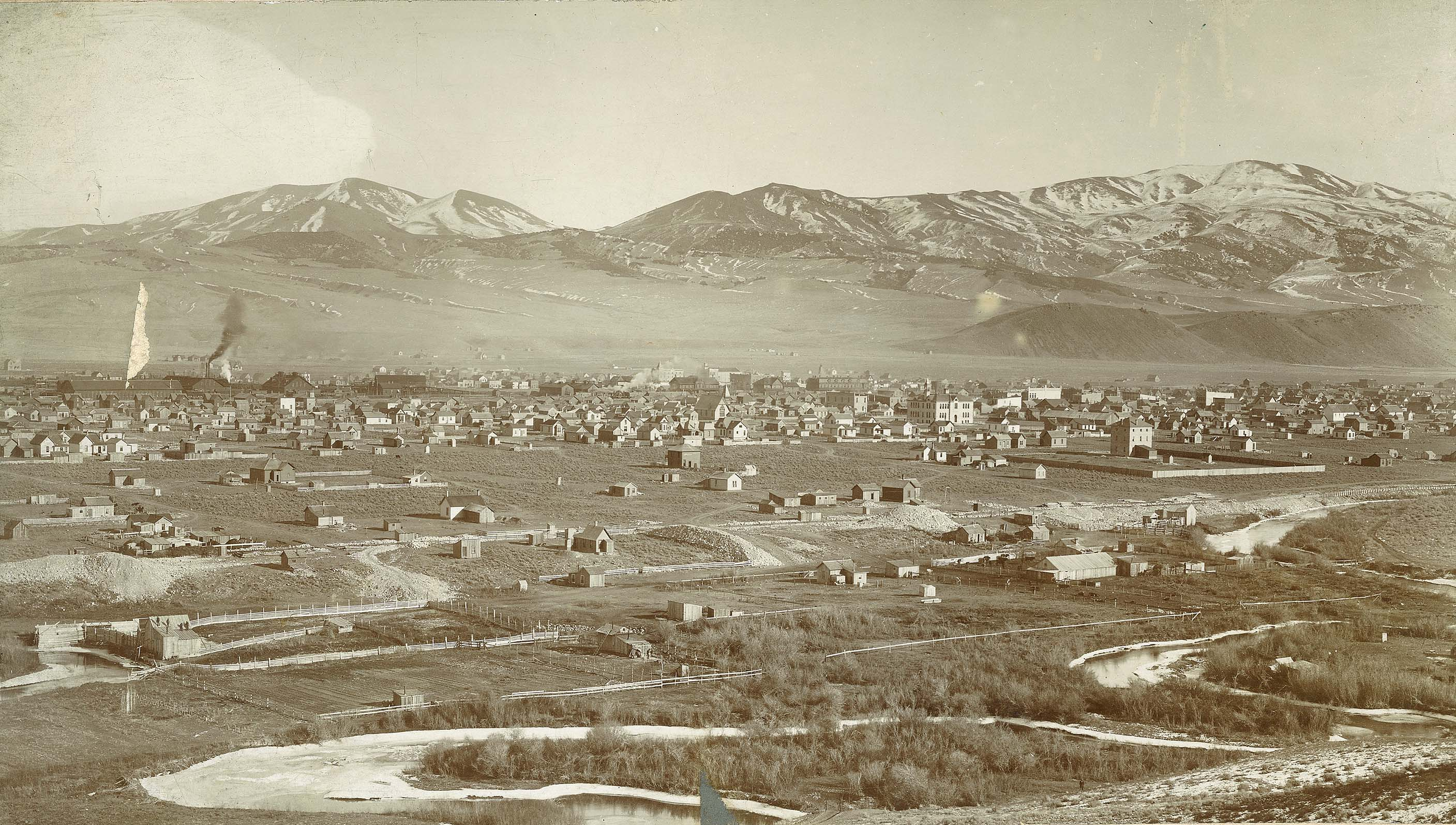
Pocatello in 1892, probably photographed by Charles Roscoe Savage

density was 1,685.4 inhabitants per square mile (650.7/km^{2}). There were 23,357 housing units at an average density of 695.7 per square mile (268.6/km^{2}). The racial makeup of the city was 86.2% White, 2.4% Asian, 2.3% some other race, 1.5% Native American or Alaskan Native, 1.4% Black or African American, and 0.1% Native Hawaiian or Other Pacific Islander, with 6.0% from two or more races. Hispanics or Latinos of any race were 9.6% of the population.

Of the 21,657 households, 29.3% had children under the age of 18 living with them, 25.1% had seniors 65 years or older living with them, 44.3% were married couples living together, 7.3% were couples cohabitating, 22.7% had a male householder with no partner present, and 25.8% had a female householder with no partner present. The median household size was 2.48 and the median family size was 3.30.

The age distribution was 24.8% under 18, 12.5% from 18 to 24, 29.2% from 25 to 44, 19.9% from 45 to 64, and 13.6% who were 65 or older. The median age was 32.9 years. For every 100 females, there were 102.7 males.

The median income for a household was $56,115, with family households having a median income of $76,299 and non-family households $35,964. The per capita income was $28,922. Males working full-time jobs had median earnings of $52,873 compared to $42,456 for females. Out of the 53,680 people with a determined poverty status, 14.4% were below the poverty line. Further, 17.0% of minors and 12.3% of seniors were below the poverty line.

In the survey, residents self-identified with various ethnic ancestries. People of English descent made up 20.5% of the population of the town, followed by German at 14.2%, Irish at 9.8%, American at 6.0%, Scottish at 4.0%, Italian at 3.0%, Danish at 3.0%, Swedish at 2.7%, Norwegian at 2.6%, French at 2.0%, Welsh at 2.0%, Polish at 1.4%, Swiss at 1.3%, Scotch-Irish at 1.2%, and Dutch at 1.0%.

== Government ==
Pocatello's current mayor is Mark Dahlquist, who was sworn into office on January 8, 2026. The 2025 mayoral election saw incumbent Brian Blad, who had previously governed over Pocatello since 2010, eliminated, with Dahlquist then defeating candidate Greg Cates in the runoff election to become mayor-elect.

== Economy ==
Idaho Department of Correction operates the Pocatello Women's Correctional Center (PWCC) in Pocatello.

The United States Postal Service operates the Pocatello, Bannock, and Gateway Station post offices.

The Federal Bureau of Investigation is building a data center in Pocatello as part of an initiative to consolidate operations into three enterprise data centers.

=== Top employers ===
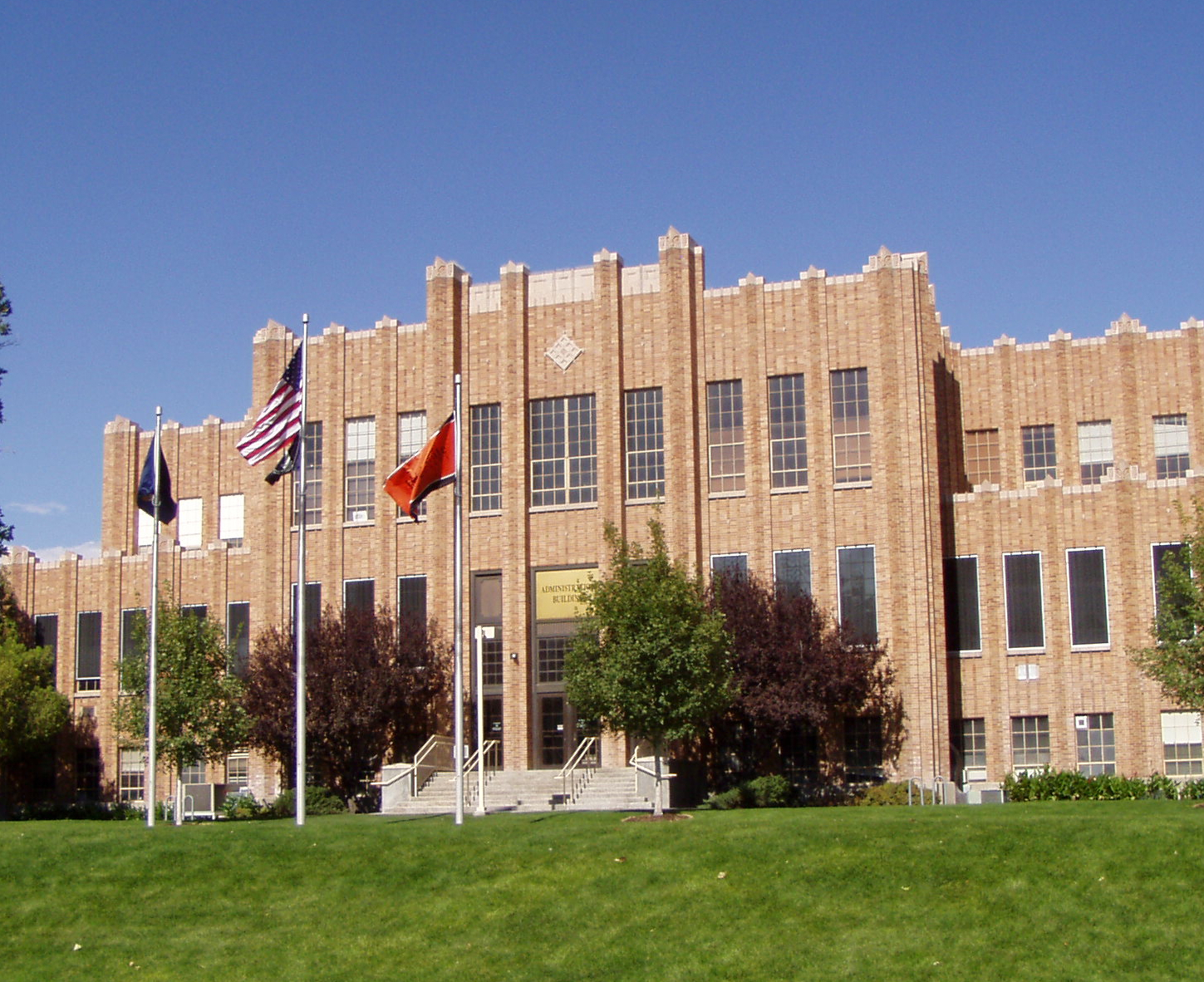
Idaho State University Administration Building

According to Pocatello's 2023 Comprehensive Annual Financial Report, the top employers in the city are:

#	Employer	# of Employees
1	Idaho State University	2500–4999
2	School District 25	1000–2499
3	Portneuf Medical Center	1000–2499
4	Idaho Central Credit Union	1000–2499
5	Amy's Kitchen	500–999
6	City of Pocatello	500–999
7	ON Semiconductor	500–999
8	Safe Haven	
9	Bannock County	430
10	Walmart	250–499

== Arts and culture ==
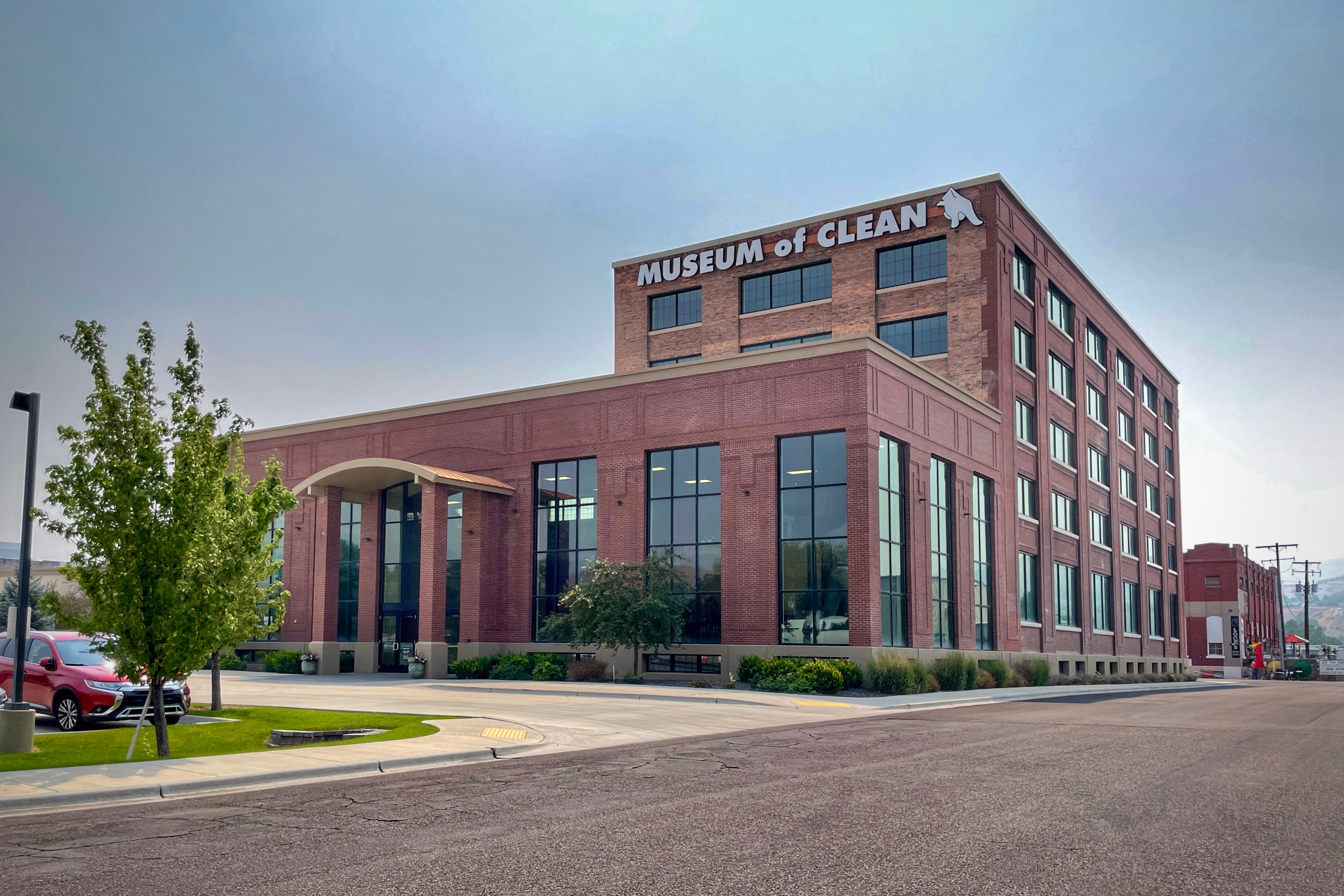
Museum of Clean

Pocatello is home to Idaho Museum of Natural History, Museum of Clean, Bannock County Historical Complex, and the Fort Hall Replica and Museum.

Idaho State University's L.E. and Thelma E. Stephens Performing Arts Center is the largest such complex in Pocatello and hosts dance, theater, music, and other entertainment events. The grand concert hall seats up to 1,200 people.

The Westside Players is a non-profit community theatre company that hosts shows at The Warehouse in the Warehouse District of Pocatello.

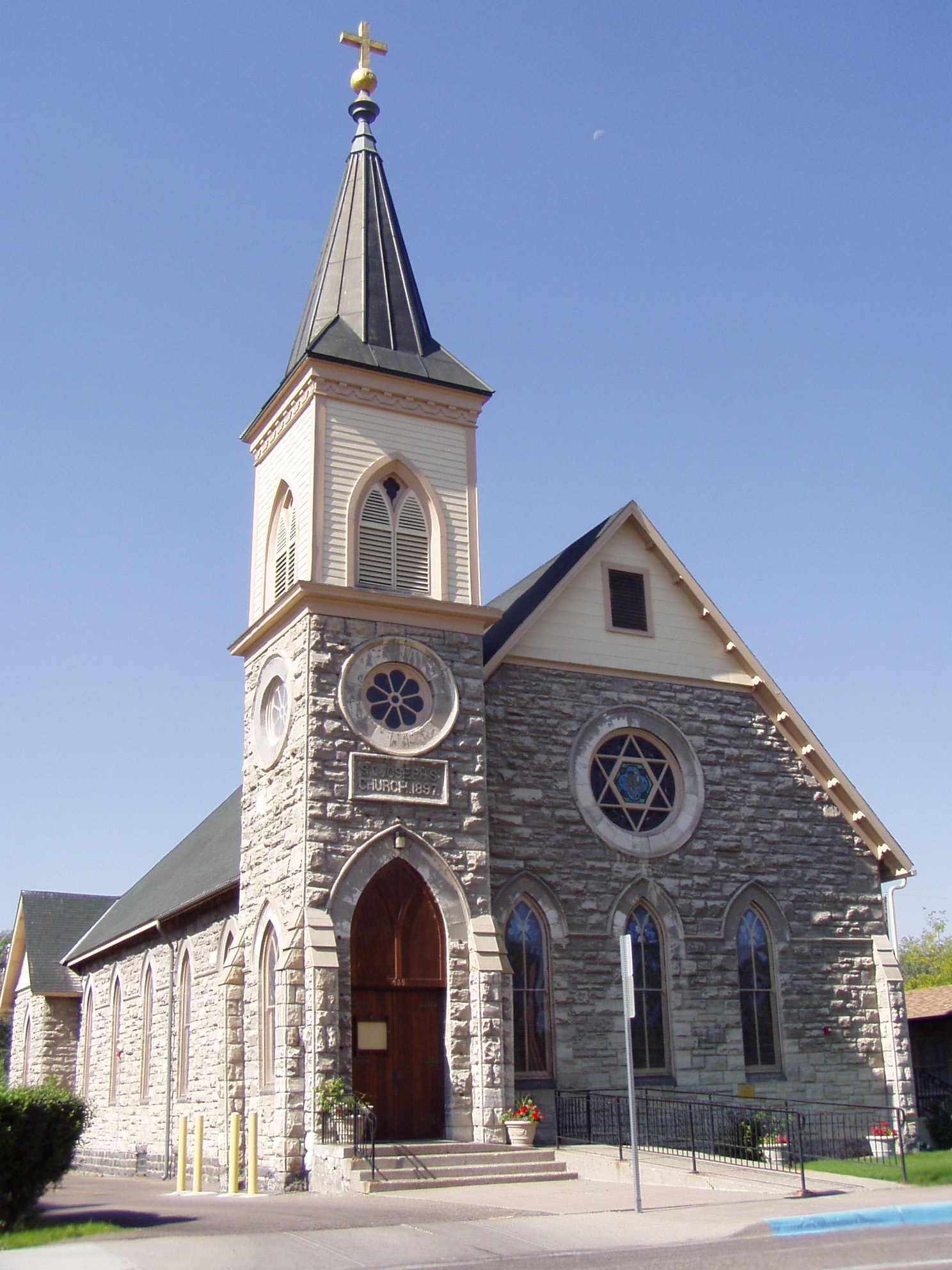
St. Joseph's Catholic Church Pocatello (built 1897)

There are over twenty National Historic Places in Pocatello including St. Joseph's Catholic Church, Trinity Episcopal Church, Church of the Assumption, Bethel Baptist Church, A.F.R. Building, Standrod House, John Hood House, Idaho State University Administration Building, Pocatello Carnegie Library, and multiple historic districts.

== Sports ==
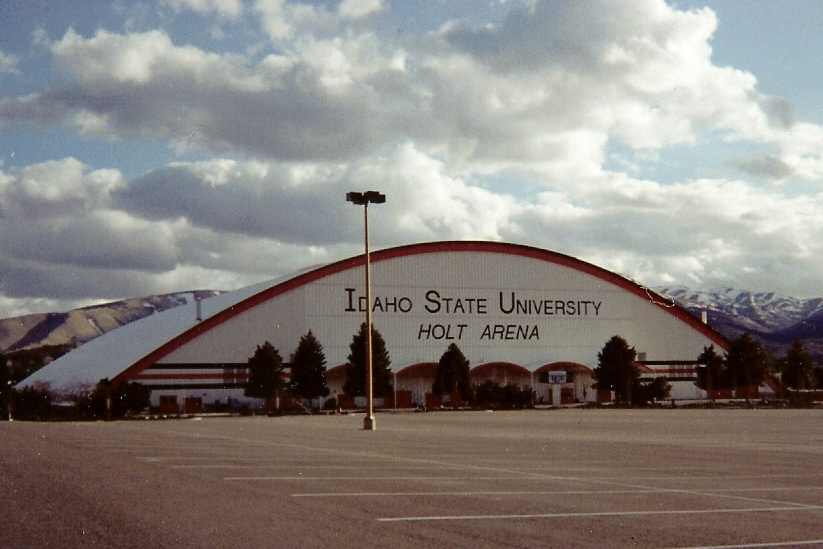
Holt Arena (Now ICCU Dome), Idaho State University, Pocatello, Idaho

Pocatello is home to Holt Arena, a multipurpose indoor stadium that opened in 1970 on the ISU campus. Known as the "Minidome" until 1988, Holt Arena was the home of the Real Dairy Bowl, a junior college football Bowl game. Holt Arena also plays host to the Simplot Games, the nation's largest indoor high school track-and-field meet.

The Pocatello Marathon and Half Marathon are held annually. Times from the course may be used to qualify for the Boston and New York marathons.

Outdoor sports, both winter and summer, play an important role in the culture of Pocatello. Pebble Creek, Idaho is a ski resort located just south of Pocatello and offers skiing and snowboarding.

Pocatello is also home to a semi-pro baseball team, the Gate City Grays, who are a member of the Northern Utah League. The Grays play in Halliwell Park located at 1100 W. Alameda. They were NUL champions in both 2015 and 2016.

== Education ==
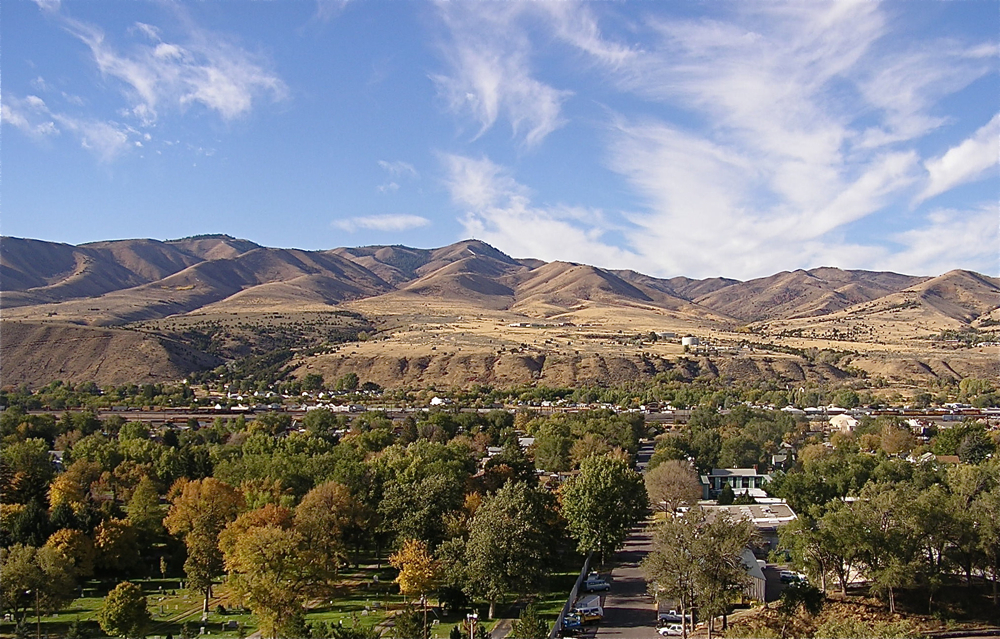
Western Pocatello in 2009, from Red Hill on the ISU campus

=== Primary and secondary education ===
All of the Bannock County portion of Pocatello is served by the Pocatello/Chubbuck School District #25. The district is home to three public high schools, four public middle schools and thirteen public elementary schools.

Additionally, there are two public charter schools, and various alternative and church-based private schools and academies.

The portion of Pocatello in Power County is within American Falls Joint School District 381.

==== High schools ====
- Century High School
- Highland High School
- Pocatello High School

==== Middle schools ====
- Alameda Middle School
- Franklin Middle School
- Hawthorne Middle School
- Irving Middle School

==== Elementary schools ====
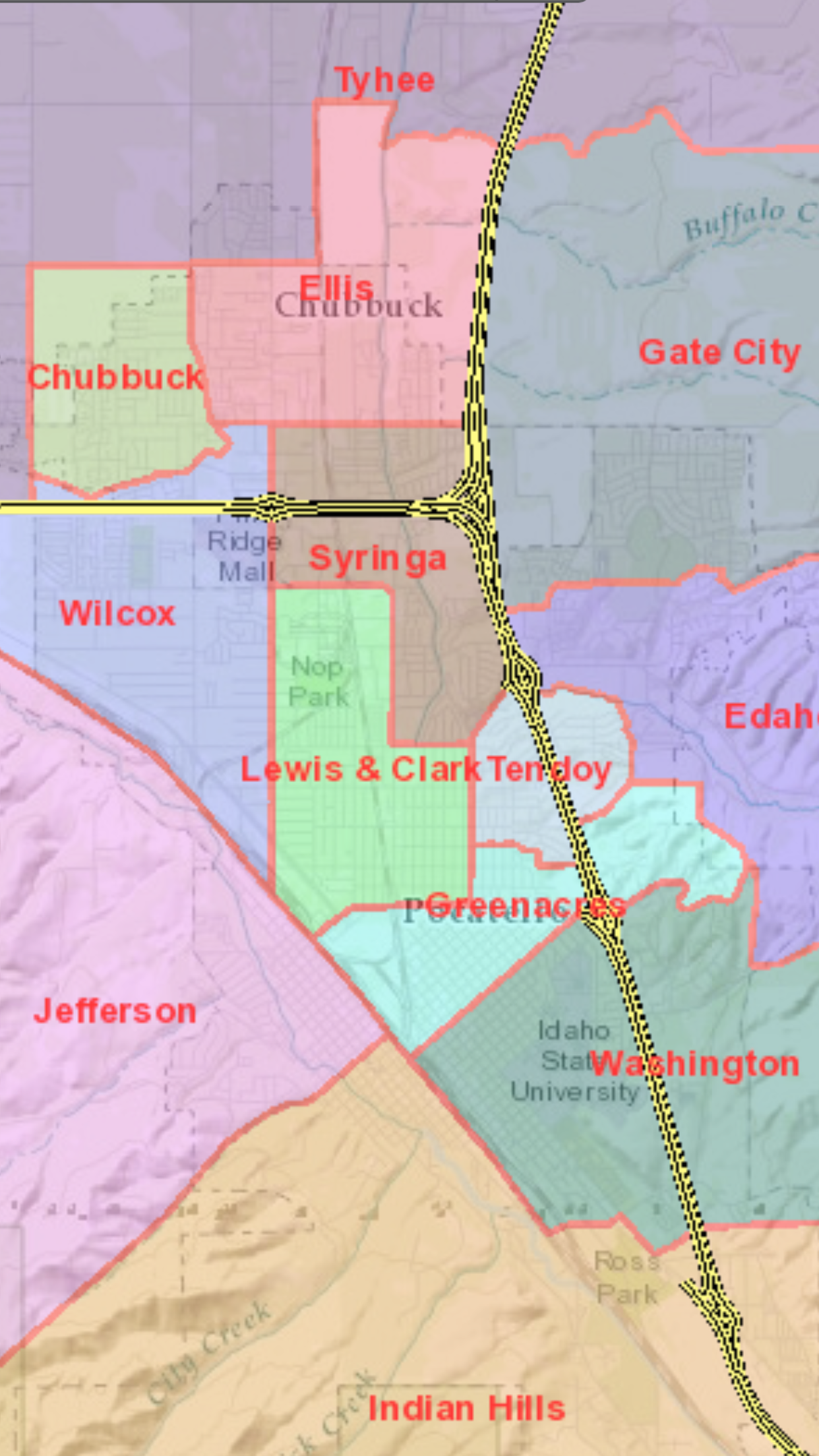
- Elementary school boundaries of Pocatello
  Chubbuck Elementary School
- Edahow Elementary School
- Ellis Elementary School
- Gate City Elementary School
- Gem Prep (private)
- Greenacres Elementary School
- Indian Hills Elementary School
- Jefferson Elementary School
- Lewis & Clark Elementary School
- Syringa Elementary School
- Tendoy Elementary School
- Tyhee Elementary School
- Wilcox Elementary School
- Washington Elementary School

=== Higher education ===
Idaho State University (ISU) is a public university operated by the state of Idaho. Originally an auxiliary campus of the University of Idaho and then a state college, it became the second university in the state in 1963. The ISU campus is in Pocatello, with outreach programs in Coeur d'Alene, Idaho Falls, Boise, and Twin Falls. The university's 123,000-square-foot (11,400 m^{2}) L.E. and Thelma E. Stephens Performing Arts Center occupies a prominent location overlooking Pocatello and the lower Portneuf River Valley. The center's three venues provide performance space, including the Joseph C. and Cheryl H. Jensen Grand Concert Hall. Idaho State's athletics teams compete in the Big Sky Conference, the football and basketball teams play in Holt Arena.

== Infrastructure ==
=== Transportation ===
Commercial air service is available via Pocatello Regional Airport. Pocatello Regional Transit provides bus service on five hourly routes, Monday through Saturday. There is currently no evening or Sunday service.

== Notable people ==
- Chris Abernathy, electrician and member of the Idaho House of Representatives
- Torey Adamcik, one of two perpetrators of the Murder of Cassie Jo Stoddart.
- Neil L. Andersen, member of the Quorum of the 12 Apostles, The Church of Jesus Christ of Latter-Day Saints
- Don Aslett, entrepreneur and founder of the town's Museum of Clean
- Kayla Barron, NASA astronaut
- Billie Bird (1908–2002), comedian and actress
- Greg Byrne, athletic director at University of Alabama
- Shay Carl, vlogger, one of the original founders of Maker Studios, which was sold to Walt Disney Co. in 2014
- Gloria Dickson, actress
- Jan Broberg Felt, actress
- George V. Hansen, politician
- Taysom Hill, NFL tight end for the New Orleans Saints
- Merril Hoge, analyst for ESPN, NFL running back
- Tristen Hoge, offensive guard for the New York Jets
- Miranda Hope, The Secret Lives of Mormon Wives cast member
- Bryan Johnson, NFL football player
- James Edmund Johnson, Medal of Honor recipient, posthumously, for valor in combat in the Korean War
- Dirk Koetter, interim offensive coordinator for the Boise State Broncos
- Wendy J. Olson, U.S. Attorney for the District of Idaho
- C. Ben Ross, Mayor of Pocatello and 15th governor of Idaho
- Bill Salkeld, Major League Baseball catcher
- Richard G. Scott, member of the Quorum of the 12 Apostles, The Church of Jesus Christ of Latter-Day Saints
- Tom Spanbauer, writer, winner of the Stonewall Book Award
- Branden Steineckert, musician
- Edward Stevenson, costume designer for numerous films including Citizen Kane and It's a Wonderful Life
- Minerva Teichert, artist
- Tommy Togiai, defensive tackle for the Cleveland Browns
- Celeste West, librarian and lesbian author, born Pocatello 1942
- Logan Wilde, professional archer
- Reo Wilde, professional archer
- Jack Williams, news anchor on WBZ-TV in Boston, Massachusetts
- Benedicte Wrensted, photographer, lived in Pocatello from 1895 to 1912
- Cassie Jo Stoddart, high school junior, killed in a thrill killing in 2006.

== In popular culture ==
- The Great Food Truck Race Season 4, Episode 3, "Potatoes in Pocatello". Pocatello, Idaho is the location of episode 3 food truck race challenge. Much of the city is shown, as well as the local foot traffic.
- In Millennium's first season episode "Force Majeure", a doomsday cult has chosen Pocatello, Idaho as their place of refuge due to its geological stability.

== See also ==
- List of counties in Idaho
