= List of school shootings in South America =

This is a list of school shootings in South America. The list includes shootings that occurred in primary, secondary, and post-secondary schools, as well as on school buses. This list does not include other types of attacks, such as arson, stabbings, and others. The term "school shooting" excludes:

- Cases involving conflicts.
- Suicide of one or more individuals.
- Cases committed during police operations.

== List of deadliest school shootings in continent with more than three deaths ==
#	Date	Location	Country	Dead	Injured	Total	Article
1°	7 April 2011	Rio de Janeiro City	Brazil	13	22	35	Rio de Janeiro school shooting
2°	13 March 2019	Suzano	Brazil	9	11	20	Suzano massacre
3°	25 November 2022	Aracruz	Brazil	4	11	15	Aracruz school shootings
4°	18 October 2024	Heliópolis	Brazil	4	0	4	Heliópolis school shooting
5°	6 October 1999	Campinas	Brazil	3	6	9	Campinas school shooting
6°	28 September 2004	Carmen de Patagones	Argentina	3	5	8	Carmen de Patagones school shooting
7°	17 December 1999	Valparaíso	Chile	3	1	4	Valparaíso school shootings
8°	16 March 2019	Iquique	Chile	3	0	3	Iquique military school shooting
8°	28 November 2025	Rio de Janeiro City	Brazil	3	0	3	Maracanã school shooting

== 20th century ==
Date	Location	Dead	Injured	Total	Description
1967
30 June 1967	São Paulo City, Brazil	2 (Note: Including the perpetrator.)	0	2	Brasil Acióli Júnior, 20, shoots his 18-year-old girlfriend to death in the classroom before killing himself.
1969
19 April 1969	Curitiba, Brazil	1	1	2	Marcel Bergmann kills a teacher with multiple shots to the head and heart before fleeing. During the escape, Bergmann hits a second teacher in the head with the butt of a gun.
1971
7 October 1971	Cabo do Santo Agostinho, Brazil	1	1	2	Severino Matos de Vasconcelhos shot and killed one student and seriously injured another before being arrested.
1972
16 December 1972	Juiz de Fora, Brazil	1	2	3	Nilson Resende went to a school and killed a student and injured her boyfriend, before trying to kill himself with a shot to the head.
1985
24 August 1985	São Paulo City, Brazil	2	0	2	João Francisco Varjão Filho, 23, broke into a college and killed a student who had rejected him, before killing himself.
1994
27 July 1994	Brasília, Brazil	1	1	2	Psychologist Ricardo de Brito Rocha, 40, fought with a student before shooting him and another colleague, who later died in hospital.
1995
11 December 1995	São Paulo City, Brazil	2	1	3	Christian Hartmann, a 21-year-old student, shoots his two classmates, including a female student he liked, killing her, before committing suicide with a gunshot to the mouth.
1996
1 April 1996	Lorena, Brazil	1	1	2	Antônio Carlos de Costa, 29, opened fire inside the university, killing a 44-year-old professor and injuring his 41-year-old secretary, before fleeing.
14 August 1996	São Paulo, Brazil	0	1	1	A 15-year-old accidentally shot a classmate in the mouth with a revolver, wounding him.
1997
6 May 1997	Buenos Aires, Argentina	0	1	1	A football-related fight resulted in an 18-year-old student striking a 21-year-old classmate.
9 May 1997	Buenos Aires, Argentina	1	0	1	A 14-year-old student took a firearm from his father to school and accidentally, the gun went off, killing a student.
24 November 1997	Taboão da Serra, Brazil	1 (Note: Only the perpetrator.)	1	2	After a fight, the student, Rodolfo Eduardo Kersul, 17, tries to shoot his classmates, but accidentally hits his 18-year-old friend before killing himself.
1998
30 April 1998	Iguatu, Brazil	1	1	2	Gilcimar Bianchi, 21, broke into a school bus and took a student, his ex-girlfriend, hostage, in addition to freeing the students and the driver. After hours of negotiations with the police, Bianchi shot and seriously wounded the student in the head and shot himself in the head, dying days later in the hospital.
1999
19 April 1999	Ribeirão Preto, Brazil	1	1	2	The young N. A. S., 13, fired shots in front of a school that hit and killed a 17-year-old student on the court, in addition to wounding a 14-year-old student in the foot.
11 May 1999	Lorena, Brazil	0	1	1	A 14-year-old student was accidentally shot in the leg in a school bathroom.
6 October 1999	Campinas, Brazil	3	6	9	Campinas school shooting: Four men stormed a school in Campinas, killing three students with gunshots and wounding six others, in addition to beating a seventh. The squad escaped the school after the crime; only one of them was arrested and tried.
17 December 1999	Valparaíso, Chile	2 (in the first attack) 1 (in the second attack)	0 (in the first attack) 1 (in the second attack)	2 (in the first attack) 2 (in the second attack)	Valparaíso school shootings: Iván Arancibia Navarro, 47, drove to a high school with his daughter before killing her and a principal. Arancibia escaped and drove to a second school, killing another principal, before shooting himself in the mouth.

== 21st century ==
Date	Location	Dead	Injured	Total	Description
2000
25 February 2000	São Paulo City, Brazil	1	3	4	Two teenagers went on a shooting spree that hit three students and a staff member, killing one of the students.
4 August 2000	Rafael Calzada, Argentina	1	1	2	Rafael Calzada school shooting: Javier Ignacio Romero, 18, shot two students in front of a school before leaving. One of the students, 16, died days later in the hospital.
2001
6 March 2001	Limeira, Brazil	1	2	3	Two underage brothers shot three young men, two of them students at the school, killing a 13-year-old student, before fleeing in their mother's car.
6 August 2001	Macaúbas, Brazil	0	7	7	Roberio Souza de Oliveira, 18, broke into his old school and armed with a shotgun, slightly injured six students, most of them girls, and a female teacher, before fleeing.
2002
27 March 2002	Foz do Iguaçu, Brazil	1	2	3	Three students aged 12 to 15 are shot inside a school bus by Pedro da Silva Prusch, 51, killing a 14-year-old boy.
11 May 2002	Cascavel, Brazil	0	3	3	J. O., 16 years old, shot three students (two girls and a boy), seriously injuring the boy and slightly injuring the two girls.
28 October 2002	Salvador, Brazil	2	0	2	Sigma School shooting: The 17-year-old student, E.R., shot two 15-year-old female students before being turned over to authorities.
2003
28 January 2003	Taiúva, Brazil	1	8	9	Taiúva school shooting: Edmar Aparecido Freitas, an 18-year-old former student, shot six students, two of them seriously, and two staff members, before killing himself.
17 February 2003	Belo Horizonte, Brazil	1	3	4	Student Warley Pinto, 16, was shot by armed youths in a gang attack. Pinto then shot three students, one of whom died in the hospital days later.
24 April 2003	Buenos Aires, Argentina	1	0	1	Alberto Gristaldi broke into a private school and, armed with a pistol, shot and killed a 48-year-old administrator.
20 May 2003	Francisco Morato, Brazil	1	1	2	A school shooting by an unknown gunman killed an 18-year-old student and injured a 20-year-old classmate.
4 November 2003	São Paulo, Brazil	1	1	2	A 19-year-old accidentally shot and killed a 14-year-old classmate and injured a second student.
2004
5 February 2004	Remanso, Brazil	1	2	3	D., 17, broke into a computer school and shot three women, two students and an employee, killing one of them, before being subdued.
27 September 2004	Santa Juana, Chile	1	0	1	Armed with a 12-gauge shotgun, 17-year-old Fernando Fernández lured Ángelo Zúñiga Faúndez into a bathroom, where he shot and killed him as revenge in a love conflict. Due to his status as a minor at the tine, he was ultimately sentenced to 4 years' parole.
28 September 2004	Carmen de Patagones, Argentina	3	5	8	Carmen de Patagones school shooting: Rafael Solich, 15, burst into a classroom and shot eight classmates, killing three of them, before being restrained by a classmate.
2005
19 August 2005	Contagem, Brazil	1	2	3	An unidentified man shot three students at the gates of a school, killing a 15-year-old student.
29 September 2005	São Paulo, Brazil	1	0	1	15-year-old bystander Ivanilton Gomes da Silva was accidentally shot to death in a classroom when a group of students fired a revolver.
17 October 2005	São Paulo, Brazil	1	0	1	15-year-old Rafael Barbosa Osti was accidentally shot in the back and killed by another student.
2007
26 February 2007	Encarnación, Paraguay	0	1	1	Orlando Giménez Ruíz Díaz, 33, wounded his teacher with three shots at a university in the country.
3 December 2007	Betim, Brazil	1	1	2	A fight led to Wharley Costa Borges, 23, shooting two 16-year-old students, killing one of them.
2009
26 March 2009	São Paulo, Brazil	0	1	1	A 14-year-old accidentally shot another student in the knee.
17 December 2009	Piracicaba, Brazil	2	0	2	José Maria Roque, 55, broke into a school and shot dead a teacher of the same age, before committing suicide with a self-inflicted gunshot.
2010
29 September 2010	Embu das Artes, Brazil	1	0	1	9-year-old Miguel Cestari Ricci dos Santos was killed in a classroom by a classmate.
6 October 2010	São Paulo City, Brazil	2	0	2	Reginaldo Silva, 38, shot and killed his wife at a school before killing himself.
4 November 2010	Araucária, Brazil	1	1	2	A 19-year-old man who tried to impress students in a school gymnasium by firing into the air, shot and hit two 15-year-old students, one of whom died days later.
2011
7 April 2011	Rio de Janeiro City, Brazil	13	22	35	Rio de Janeiro school shooting: Welligton Menezes de Oliveira, 23, a former student, invades a school in Realengo and kills twelve students and injures 22, before being shot by a police officer who was nearby and then committing suicide with a shot to the head.
19 May 2011	Betim, Brazil	1	2	3	A 16-year-old shot three students aged 18 and 19 who were leaving school, killing one 18-year-old student.
22 September 2011	São Caetano do Sul, Brazil	1	1	2	Davi Mota Nogueira, a 10-year-old student, shot his 38-year-old teacher in the lower back inside the classroom before killing himself on the school stairs.
2012
11 April 2012	João Pessoa, Brazil	0	3	3	A 16-year-old student shot three classmates (two girls and one boy), wounding them.
1° June 2012	Caxias do Sul, Brazil	1	1	2	A 24-year-old man is suspected of shooting and killing a student and injuring his friend in front of the school in Caxias do Sul.
11 September 2012	Dois Vizinhos, Brazil	0	2	2	A 27-year-old man stormed a school and shot his ex-girlfriend and a student, wounding them, before fleeing and being arrested in the state of Santa Catarina.
26 October 2012	Belo Horizonte, Brazil	1	1	2	Adiel Alves, 21, stormed a university and shot a security guard in the arm before being fatally shot.
2013
10 May 2013	Vespasiano, Brazil	1	2	3	A young man shot three students in front of a school, killing a 16-year-old student in the head and groin.
13 May 2013	Barcarena, Brazil	0	3	3	A 15-year-old student shot three classmates in front of a school in Barcarena.
4 July 2013	Belo Horizonte, Brazil	0	2	2	Alexandre Esteves dos Santos, an 19-year-old student with a disability, shot and wounded two 16-year-old students.
30 September 2013	Curitiba, Brazil	1	1	2	A 17-year-old student shot a student he liked and her boyfriend, killing the student who died days later in the hospital.
7 October 2013	José da Penha, Brazil	2	0	2	José Marcos Alves, 33, killed a 16-year-old female student in a crime of passion, before killing himself.
2014
13 December 2014	Ladainha, Brazil	1	1	2	José Geraldo Rodrigues invaded Ladainha's school and shot his ex-wife before killing himself.
2015
29 December 2015	Itaporanga, Brazil	2	0	2	Antônio Alves Filho, 50, shot and killed a 48-year-old teacher before committing suicide at a daycare center in Paraíba.
2016
1° July 2016	Jundiaí, Brazil	2	0	2	Edmilson José dos Santos, 46, shot his ex-wife before committing suicide with a shot to the head.
2017
18 January 2017	Monterrey, Nuevo León, Mexico	2	3	5	Colegio Americano del Noreste shooting: A 16-year-old student opened fire in his classroom with a .22-caliber pistol, seriously wounding a teacher—who died two months later—along with two other students, while another sustained minor injuries, before turning the weapon on himself.
20 February 2017	Goiás City, Brazil	0	2	2	A fight over a kite resulted in a 17-year-old being charged, injuring two classmates, including a child, who was shot.
15 March 2017	San Estanislao, Paraguay	0	2	2	Carlos González, 38, broke into his ex-wife's school and, armed with a handgun, injured her and another adult who tried to stop the shooter.
20 October 2017	Goiânia, Brazil	2	4	6	Goyases School shooting: A 14-year-old student shot six classmates, killing two of them and seriously wounding one of the four wounded, before being persuaded by a school teacher to end the attack.
2018
28 September 2018	Medianeira, Brazil	0	2	2	Medianeira school shooting: Two 15-year-old students shot two classmates inside the classroom.
2019
13 March 2019	Suzano, Brazil	9 (Note: Including both perpetrators.)	11	20	Suzano massacre: Two former students, aged 17 and 25, Guilherme Taucci Monteiro and Luiz Henrique Castro, invaded a school in Suzano and shot and killed five students and two staff members, in addition to wounding eleven other students, two seriously. Taucci then killed Henrique and committed suicide.
16 March 2019	Iquique, Chile	3	0	3	Iquique military school shooting: The cadet, Marco Antonio Velásquez González, 18, fatally shot a corporal and a superior officer before committing suicide.
19 March 2019	Lima, Peru	1	1	2	A 15-year-old student accidentally fired shots from his backpack, killing one classmate in the arm and wounding a second in the leg.
27 May 2019	Puerto Montt, Chile	0	1	1	A 14-year-old student stormed a school and fired three times, wounding a classmate, before trying to escape and being detained.
10 June 2019	Babahoyo, Ecuador	1	1	2	Criminals chased a student's father into the school, shooting him dead and injuring a 6-year-old child.
7 November 2019	Caraí, Brazil	0	2	2	A 17-year-old student fired shots at two classmates, including one who was shot in the neck.
2020
10 January 2020	Torreón, Coahuila, Mexico	José Ángel Ramos Betts	2	6	Colegio Cervantes shooting:An 11-year-old student opened fire on the school playground with .40- and .25-caliber pistols, injuring five students and one teacher before fatally shooting another teacher and subsequently committing suicide.
2022
26 September 2022	Barreiras, Brazil	1	1	2	2022 Barreiras school attack: Isaac Silva Chagas, 14, shot and stabbed a 19-year-old female student in a wheelchair, killing him, before being shot by two armed police officers.
5 October 2022	Sobral, Brazil	1	2	3	A 15-year-old student accidentally fired his firearm, hitting three students, one of whom died in the hospital days later from brain death after being shot in the head.
25 November 2022	Aracruz, Brazil	3 (in the first attack) 1 (in the second attack)	8 (in the first attack) 2 (in the second attack)	11 (in the first attack) 3 (in the second attack)	Aracruz school shootings: Gabriel Rodrigues, 16, broke into a school in Aracruz and shot several teachers, killing three of them (two died instantly). He then fled the scene and went to a second school, where he killed a 12-year-old student and seriously injured two others.
2023
31 May 2023	Pudahuel, Chile	0	1	1	A teacher was shot by a 14-year-old student, who was discovered by police with an arsenal and drugs.
19 June 2023	Cambé, Brazil	2	0	2	Cambé school shooting: Marcos Vinícius, 21, broke into his old school and shot and killed a 17-year-old student, in addition to seriously injuring her 16-year-old boyfriend, before surrendering to a resident. The boyfriend died the next day from a gunshot wound to the head.
23 October 2023	São Paulo City, Brazil	1	2	3	Sapopemba State School shooting: Lucas de Oliveira Tucci, 16, shot three female students aged 17 and 15, killing one of the 17-year-old students.
1 November 2023	Claro dos Porções, Brazil	2	1	3	Manoel Pinheiro Neto, 51, shot his own 5-year-old son and the child's stepfather in front of the daycare center before killing himself. The hunter's son also died.
2024
18 October 2024	Heliópolis, Brazil	4	0	4	Heliópolis school shooting: 14-year-old student Samuel Santana Andrade shot and killed three 15-year-old classmates before shooting himself in the chest.
28 November 2024	Soledad, Colombia	0	3	3	Two students and a teacher were shot in the schoolyard when someone arrived at the school's door and started shooting.
2025
3 April 2025	Campina Grande, Brazil	2	1	3	Flávio Medeiros invaded a university in Paraíba and shot and killed one man and wounded another before escaping and later fatally shooting himself.
8 May 2025	Cali, Colombia	1	2	3	A man entered the campus of the University of Valle and shot and seriously injured two women before killing himself with a self-inflicted gunshot.
16 May 2025	Cartagena, Colombia	1	0	1	A man was shot dead in a schoolyard.
29 May 2025	San Pedro de la Paz, Chile	0	3	3	A 17-year-old shot and wounded a student as retaliation for a previous fight, also injuring two students who tried to detain him. Two other young people were arrested on suspicion of being connected to the crime, as they allegedly stood at the entrance of the school to aide in his getaway.
19 June 2025	Quito, Ecuador	0	0	0	A 14-year-old fired a revolver at school, hitting no one. He and a 15-year-old who provided the gun were arrested.
10 September 2025	La Paz, Argentina	0	0	0	A 14-year-old girl fired shots and threatened to kill multiple people at her school before surrendering to police after a five-hour standoff.
25 September 2025	Sobral, Brazil	2	3	5	Multiple shooters fired at students in a school parking lot, killing two people and wounding three others.
28 November 2025	Rio de Janeiro, Brazil	3	0	3	Maracanã school shooting: João Antônio Miranda Tello Ramos Gonçalves, 47 years old, an employee, shot and killed two female coworkers before killing himself at a technical school.
2026
24 March 2026	Lázaro Cárdenas, Michoacán, Mexico	Osmer H. A.	2	0	2026 Lázaro Cárdenas school shooting: A 15-year-old attempted to gain access to his school with an AR-15–style rifle. When staff impeded his path, he opened fire on them, killing two. He was arrested at the location of the crime.
30 March 2026	San Cristóbal, Argentina	1	8	9	San Cristóbal school shooting: A 15-year-old student opened fire with a shotgun at his school, killing a 13-year-old student and injuring several more before classmates tackled and disarmed him.
5 May 2026	Rio Branco, Brazil	2	2	4	2026 Rio Branco school shooting: A 13-year old student opened fire at his school in Rio Branco, Brazil killing 2 teachers & injuring 2 more before abandoning his gun and going to the police station to turn himself in.
15 September 2026	La Matanza Partido, Argentina	0	0	0	A student's revolver accidentally discharged in his backpack.

== See also ==
- List of school attacks in Argentina
- List of school attacks in Brazil
- List of school attacks in Chile
- List of school shootings in Europe
- Lists of school-related attacks
