= Campinas shooting =

Campinas shooting may refer to:

- Campinas school shooting, a 1999 school shooting in Campinas, São Paulo, Brazil
- Campinas massacre, a 2016 mass shooting in Campinas, São Paulo, Brazil
- Campinas Cathedral shooting, a 2018 shooting incident at the Metropolitan Cathedral in Campinas, São Paulo, Brazil
