= 2017 Goyases School shooting =

School shooting in Brazil

Goyases School shooting
- Location: Goiânia, Goiás, Brazil
- Date: 20 October 2017; 11:50 a.m. (BRST (UTC-2))
- Attack type: Mass shooting; school shooting
- Weapon: Taurus PT100
- Deaths: 2
- Injuries: 4
- Perpetrator: J.C.A.M.
- Motive: Retaliation for bullying

In the morning of 20 October 2017, a 14-year-old student only identified as J.C.A.M, opened fire with a .40-caliber Taurus PT100 pistol at Goyases School, a private school in Goiânia, Brazil. Two people were killed and four other people were injured. The shooter intended to commit suicide, but was convinced not to by a school teacher, before being arrested by responding police officers.

In testimony to the local police, he claimed he had been obsessed with Adolf Hitler and was inspired by the Columbine High School massacre and the Rio de Janeiro school shooting. The police investigation stated that the teenager suffered bullying from his classmates. The teenager reported spending two months planning the attack to kill only one classmate, but during the attack he had a desire to kill more people.

== Shooting ==
Around 11:50 a.m., during the break between classes, the student was in the classroom with a pistol inside a backpack. He drew his gun and then started shooting, killing students João Pedro Calembo and João Vitor Gomes, and injuring four others, with one girl becoming paraplegic. The weapon, a .40 caliber Taurus PT100 pistol, belonged to his mother who, like his father, is a military police officer.

Further tragedy was prevented thanks to the intervention of the coordinator Simone Maulaz Elteto, who entered the room, at the moment when there were only the shooter and three fallen students, two of whom were already supposedly dead. According to her, there were other rooms with students, with the risk that he would cause more victims or commit suicide. Simone was able to persuade the shooter to accompany her to the library, where she was able to calm him down until he dropped the gun. At that moment, police officers entered the library and managed to arrest the boy.

== Aftermath ==
The Government of Goiás declared official mourning for three days.

== Conviction ==
On 21 October, the Public Prosecutor's Office of the State of Goiás recommended the provisional hospitalization for 45 days of the perpetrator, and hours later, the judge on duty Mônica Cézar Moreno Senhorello accepted the request. On 28 November, the shooter was sentenced to three years' preventive detention, the maximum penalty available for minors in Brazil.

In May 2020, the shooter was released.

== See also ==
- Suzano school shooting
- Campinas Cathedral shooting
- Sigma School shooting
- Janaúba massacre
