= List of school attacks in Chile =

The following is a list of school attacks in Chile, including stabbings and shootings that took place in daycare centers, schools, universities and other educational centers. Excluded from this list are the following:

1. Incidents that occurred as a result of police/military actions (such as the Santa María School massacre)
2. Suicides or suicide attempts involving only one person.

== List ==
Date	Location	Perpetrator	Dead	Injured	Description
6 December 1966	Escuela N°122 "Las Hortensias" in Los Ángeles, Biobío Region	Aladino Burgos Figueroa, 16; José Ángel Rodríguez Cifuentes, 26	2	0	Burgos, an ex-student, accompanied by a friend, robbed two teachers before beating them to death (slitting one of their throats as well), both as witness elimination and as retaliation, as one of the teachers had previously humiliated Burgos, by reading a letter from his girlfriend out loud to a class. They were both later arrested and sentenced to undisclosed prison terms.
8 October 1975	Escuela N°11 de Huequén in Angol, Araucanía Region	María Jesús Riffo Sandoval, 48	3	40	A school cook poisoned milk and cereal intended for students with arsenic to try and blame it on a different worker, as they were both in love with the same man. She was sentenced to 20 years' imprisonment, and was eventually released after 17 years.
17 December 1999	Liceo B-29 and Liceo Eduardo de la Barra in Valparaíso, Valparaíso Region	Iván Jesús Arancibia Navarro, 47	3	1 (Note: Only the perpetrator.)	Valparaíso school shootings: Recently dismissed physics professor Iván Arancibia Navarro killed three people in two different high schools, including his own three-year-old infant daughter, before attempting suicide by gunshot. He was later declared not guilty by reason of insanity
27 September 2004	Liceo Nueva Zelandia in Santa Juana, Biobío Region	Fernando Octavio Fernández Luna, 17	1	0	Armed with a 12-gauge shotgun, Fernández lured Ángelo Zúñiga Faúndez into a bathroom, where he shot and killed him as revenge in a love conflict. Due to his status as a minor at the tine, he was ultimately sentenced to 4 years' parole.
9 August 2005	Liceo Particular España in Temuco, Araucanía Region	I.H.C., 14	0	1	A student stabbed his teacher in the neck, claiming to have been under Satanic possession at the time.
5 September 2014	Colegio Bautista in Temuco, Araucanía Region	Unknown	1	0	A 22-year-old American English teacher was killed on-campus with a fire poker. Despite an arrest being made, the suspect was later acquitted and released. The case officially remains unsolved.
8 December 2015	Colegio Fresia Graciela Müller Ruiz in Lebu, Biobío Region	Unnamed	0	1	A student attacked another student with a knife, stabbing him at least four times during a fight. He was arrested.
26 August 2016	Liceo Jorge Alessandri in Calama, Antofagasta Region	Unnamed	0	1	A fight between students ended with one of the students involved being stabbed and requiring emergency transport to the local hospital. The other student involved was arrested.
16 March 2019	Escuela de Caballeria Blindada in Iquique, Tarapacá Region	Marco Antonio Velásquez González, 18	3 (Note: Including the perpetrator.)	0	Iquique military school shooting: A cadet fatally shot a corporal and a superior officer before committing suicide.
27 May 2019	Patagonia College in Puerto Montt, Los Lagos Region	M.D.A.C., 14	0	1	A student fired a .32-caliber revolver (stolen from his grandfather, a retired policeman) into a classroom, wounding a classmate in the neck, before trying to escape and being subdued and arrested. In a note left by him at home, he claimed to have planned out a massive attack, inspired by the Columbine High School massacre.
23 August 2022	Liceo Comercial in Valdivia, Los Ríos Region	Unnamed	0	1	A female student was stabbed during a fight by another young woman.
18 April 2023	Liceo Politécnico Juan Terrier Dailly in Curicó, Maule Region	Four unnamed	0	1	A 15-year-old student was attacked with a knife and brass knuckles by a group of four classmates. He had previously been bullied, both in real life and online, by the same students.
31 May 2023	Liceo Centro Educacional Pudahuel C-87 in Pudahuel, Metropolitan Region	Unnamed, 14	0	1	A student fired a gun in class. No one was directly hit, but a teacher suffered acoustic trauma. A second firearm, along with drugs, were found in the student's backpack.
23 April 2024	Escuela Industrial Salesianos in Copiapó, Atacama Region	Unnamed	0	1	A student was stabbed with a pencil during lunchtime. Initial reports indicate that the victim had an argument with another student while they were on school grounds, and the victim was then attacked in the neck area with a pencil. Emergency personnel arrived at the scene to provide first aid and transport the victim to a medical facility.
22 May 2024	Instituto Superior de Comercio in Temuco, Araucanía Region	Two unnamed	0	1	A 17-year-old student was attacked by two classmates at school. He sustained a back wound. The attackers were expelled from the school.
27 July 2024	Liceo Antonio Varas de la Barra B-4, Arica, Arica y Parinacota Region	Unnamed	0	1	Two groups of students were involved in a fight, during which one student pulled out a bladed weapon and stabbed another student. He was arrested and changed with attempted murder.
20 August 2024	Universidad de Antofagasta in Antofagasta, Antofagasta Region	Unnamed	0	1	A student was stabbed by a classmate during a fight.
5 September 2024	Colegio Nueva Era Siglo XXI in Puente Alto, Metropolitan Region	Unnamed	0	2	A fight broke out between two students, which school staff tried to break up. The mother of one of the two students stabbed a staff member before her son ran over both of them. Seven people in total were arrested.
23 October 2024	Internado Nacional Barros Arana in Quinta Normal, Metropolitan Region	Unknown	0	35	34 students and a teacher were injured when a home-made Molotov cocktail firebomb exploded inside school. The perpetrator has never been caught.
21 March 2025	Liceo Politécnico Juanita Fernández Solar in Angol, Araucanía Region	Unnamed	0	1	A 10th grade student was stabbed eight times on a staircase at the school at the start of recess. Police arrived at the scene and arrested another student from the same school as the suspect.
14 April 2025	Escuela Palestina in Curicó, Maule Region	Unnamed	0	1	A sixth-grade student was slashed in the cheek with a blade taken from a pencil sharpener, needing five stitches.
14 April 2025	Liceo María Ward in San Ignacio, Ñuble Region	Unnamed	0	1	A student was injured during a knife fight. Both perpetrators were suspended.
15 April 2025	Liceo Bicentenario de Exelencia Agrícola de Cato in Chillán, Ñuble Region	Unnamed	0	2	A student approached the school at around 10:00 p.m. and attacked two students with a bladed weapon.
29 May 2025	Colegio Nuevos Horizontes in San Pedro de la Paz, Biobío Region	S.J.O.G., 16	0	3	A teenager shot and wounded a student as retaliation for a previous fight, also wounding two students who tried to detain him. He then fled the scene, being arrested in November along with his sister, who stood armed with a knife at the exit of the school to aide in his getaway. He was later sentenced to 2 years at a juvenile correctional facility, and his sister was sentenced to 4 years' imprisonment.
3 June 2025	Liceo Comercial B72 in Estación Central, Metropolitan Region	Unnamed, 15	0	1	A student was stabbed by a classmate, identified as a Venezuelan immigrant, during a fight. The perpetrator was later arrested.
17 June 2025	Liceo Municipal Sara Troncoso in Alhué, Metropolitan Region	Unnamed, 15	0	1	A student stabbed a 16-year-old classmate without provocation while the latter was eating breakfast. The assailant, a new student, was arrested by police, who confiscated a pocket knife and brass knuckles from his backpack.
7 August 2025	Instituto Corintio in San Bernardo, Metropolitan Region	Unnamed, 14	0	1	An 8th-grade student dressed in a white overall entered his school with two Molotov cocktails. He allegedly tried setting one off, but upon failing to due so, severely beat a librarian using the bottle. He was arrested at the scene.
12 September 2025	Universidad Central de Chile in Santiago, Metropolitan Region	Unnamed	0	2	A person stabbed two students during an on-campus party. The attacker was arrested at the scene.
13 October 2025	Centro Educacional Kairos in Curicó, Maule Region	Unnamed, 14	0	2	A student stabbed a 15-year-old classmate with a knife without provocation, and then punched a teacher in the jaw when he tried to stop him, causing an injury to one of his teeth. He was locked in an office and later arrested.
26 November 2025	Universidad Técnica Federico Santa María in Valparaíso, Valparaíso Region	Ángelo Miranda Espinoza, 24 (accused)	0	1	A 24-year-old student, who allegedly suffers from previously-diagnosed medical issues, stabbed and injured his teacher after he flunked him on a test. He was arrested at the scene; In his possession was a 10-centimeter knife and a compressed air gun.
27 March 2026	Fundación Educacional Obispo Luis Silva Lezaeta in Calama, Antofagasta Region	Hernán Cristóbal Meneses Leal, 18 (accused)	1	5	2026 Calama school stabbing: A student stabbed two members of his school's staff and three students, killing a 49-year-old regional inspector. He was tackled at the scene and arrested after attempting to commit suicide.
31 March 2026	Liceo José Victorino Lastarria in Providencia, Metropolitan Region	Three unnamed students	0	1	A group of students set on fire 2 zones of the school, one of them set on fire the inspectors room, a professor was injured while trying to fight the flames.
1 April 2026	Escuela Pública República D-54 in Calama, Antofagasta Region	Unnamed	0	1	A student stabbed a 15-year-old classmate before fleeing the scene.
8 April 2026	Escuela N°332 Montserrat Robert de García in Renca, Metropolitan Region	Unnamed, 12	0	1	A first-grade student was stabbed by a student with a knife inside a school bathroom.
27 July 2026	Escuela Básica Islas de Chile, La Granja, Metropolitan Region	Unnamed, 13	0	1	A female student stabbed a 7-year-old girl.
