= List of school attacks in Mexico =

This is a chronological list of attacks that have occurred at educational institutions of all levels in Mexico. Excluded from this list are incidents that took place outside school premises, accidental shootings, and altercations in which no weapons were involved.

== List ==
Date	Location	Perpetrator	Dead	Injured	Description
6 May 2002	Jardín de Niños ''Gabriela Mistral'' in Ecatepec, State of Mexico	José Luis Nieto Ávila	2	22	A 56-year-old man ran over multiple students performing the national anthem outside of a daycare, as they refused to make way for his truck. He was sentenced to 146 years imprisonment, but he will serve only 50 years, which is the maximum sentence permitted under the law of the State of Mexico.
13 June 2007	The Churchill School in Álvaro Obregón, Mexico City	Marcelo Fernando Martínez González	1	0	The 50-year-old father of a student shot a teacher to death as retaliation for perceived negligence of the school, as his daughter was being allegedly sexually abused there. He was sentenced to 48 years imprisonment.
24 August 2007	Escuela Secundaria Técnica N.° 27 in La Ventosa, Oaxaca	Arturo Fuentes Escobar	1	1 (Note: Only the perpetrator.)	After an argument, a school principal fired a .357 Magnum revolver at his wife, a 46-year-old chemistry teacher, María Elena Toledo Constantino. He then shot himself in the head but survived.
8 August 2011	Instituto Tecnológico y de Estudios Superiores de Monterrey ''Campus Estado de México'' (Tec CEM) in Atizapán de Zaragoza, State of Mexico	Individualists Tending to the Wild	0	2	A mail bomb was sent to a teacher, which exploded, injuring him and a security guard.
23 January 2014	Escuela Primaria ''Emiliano Zapata'' in Tlayacapan, Morelos	Unknown	1	0	A 70-year-old teacher was shot by multiple unidentified assailants.
6 May 2014	Escuela Secundaria N.° 574 "Gustavo Baz Prada" in Atizapán de Zaragoza, State of Mexico	Édgar Yoevani Guzmán Barroso	1	0	A 15-year-old student shot his 13-year-old classmate Ricardo Alvarado Ordóñez in the forehead with a .32-caliber handgun due to a personal dispute. He was sentenced to 8 years in a correctional facility.
15 October 2014	Escuela Secundaria N.° 5 "General Otilio González" in Saltillo, Coahuila	Miguel Ángel (Note: These are the perpetrator or suspect's given names, as they were a minor at the time of the crime and their surnames were not released to the public.)	1	0	During a physical altercation, 14-year-old student Axel Gaudel Nava Briones was fatally wounded after being stabbed by a classmate.
22 January 2015	Centro de Estudios Tecnológicos (CETIS) N.° 68 in Los Mochis, Sinaloa	Rodolfo Perea Castro	1	0	An 18-year-old student fatally shot his classmate Joel Guevara Medina with a .380 ACP pistol after an argument. The attacker was sentenced to 2 years, 5 months, and 7 days imprisonment.
18 January 2017	Colegio Americano del Noreste in Monterrey, Nuevo León	Federico Guevara Elizondo	2 (Note: Including the perpetrator.)	3	Colegio Americano del Noreste shooting: A 16-year-old student opened fire in his classroom with a .22-caliber pistol, seriously wounding a teacher—who died two months later—along with two other students, while another sustained minor injuries, before turning the weapon on himself.
1 March 2017	Escuela Preparatoria N.° 2 ''Plantel Nezahualcóyotl'' de la Universidad Autónoma del Estado de México (UAEM) in Toluca, State of Mexico	Carlos Alejandro Medina Millán	0	5	A 16-year-old student set off a Molotov cocktail before wounding five students with an axe and fleeing the area. The attacker later confessed that he had intended to attack at least 14 people before committing suicide. He was subsequently sentenced to 4 years and 22 days in a correctional facility.
6 March 2017	Colegio Nacional de Educación Profesional Técnica (CONALEP) N.° 35 ''Plantel Lázaro Cárdenas'' in Lázaro Cárdenas, Michoacán	Unknown	1	0	An unidentified attacker fatally shot the institution’s director, Miguel Arcángel Núñez Torres.
29 March 2017	Rector’s Office Building of the Universidad Politécnica de Tlaxcala in Tlaxcala, State of Mexico	Óscar Osvaldo	0	1	An engineering student wounded institution’s director Luis Álvarez Ochoa by slashing his jugular during a physical altercation.
6 April 2017	Escuela Secundaria N.° 41 ''Dr. Albert B. Sabin'' in San Nicolás, Nuevo León	Juan Alfonso	0	1	A 15-year-old student attempted to stab a schoolteacher with a kitchen knife; however, the thick coat she was wearing prevented any injury. The attacker then suddenly began inflicting self-harm to his wrists with the same knife.
10 May 2017	Escuela Secundaria N.° 22 ''Diego Rivera'' in Guadalupe, Nuevo León	Cecilia	0	1	A 13-year-old female student slashed a 55-year-old mathematics teacher.
25 May 2017	Colegio Nacional de Educación Profesional Técnica (CONALEP) "Plantel Ing. Adrián Sada Treviño" in Monterrey, Nuevo León	Alberto David	1	0	During a physical altercation, a 16-year-old student fatally stabbed an 18-year-old classmate, Marlon Iván Guzmán Cortés.
11 April 2018	Escuela Telesecundaria N.° 399 ''Lic. Alfredo del Mazo'' in Huixquilucan, State of Mexico	Omar	1	0	A 17-year-old student fatally shot a 21-year-old classmate with a handgun before fleeing to his home and taking his own life with the same weapon.
19 February 2019	Escuela Secundaria Técnica N.° 30 in Calpulalpan, State of Mexico	Gael	0	1	A 14-year-old student stabbed his 48-year-old teacher after she expelled him from class.
10 April 2019	Universidad Autónoma de Zacatecas (UAZ), Unidad Académica de Derecho in Zacatecas, Zacatecas	Raymundo	1	0	A 22-year-old student was shot eight times and killed inside of the campus. The perpetrator managed to escape.
10 January 2020	Colegio Cervantes ''Campus del Bosque'' in Torreón, Coahuila	José Ángel Ramos Betts	2	6	Colegio Cervantes shooting: An 11-year-old student opened fire on the school playground with .40- and .25-caliber pistols, injuring five students and one teacher before fatally shooting another teacher and subsequently committing suicide.
9 May 2023	Colegio de Bachilleres de Tabasco (COBATAB) N.° 35 in Villahermosa, Tabasco	Unnamed	0	1	A student attacked a teacher with a hammer after he flunked him on a history test.
31 May 2023	Escuela Secundaria Federalizada N.° 80 "Cuauhtémoc" in La Paz, State of Mexico	Diego Antonio	0	1	A 13-year-old student intended to kill a mathematics teacher who had allegedly pulled his hair on a prior occasion. After roaming the school courtyard in search of the teacher, the boy wounded a 62-year-old janitor with a 9 mm pistol when the latter attempted to stop him upon noticing that he was armed.
5 October 2023	Escuela Secundaria General N.° 1 "Rubén Humberto Moreira Flores" in Ramos Arizpe, Coahuila	Alberto Asaid	0	1	A 14-year-old student stabbed a 59-year-old teacher, Patricia Burciaga Dávila, in retaliation for having subjected him to offensive remarks.
26 January 2024	Centro de Investigación y Desarrollo en Educación Bilingüe (CIDEB) ''Unidad Mederos'' de la Universidad Autónoma de Nuevo León (UANL) in Monterrey, Nuevo León	Alfonso	0	1	A 16-year-old student attacked a classmate, allegedly his ex-girlfriend, with a knife.
6 March 2024	Centro de Estudios "Plantel Olímpica" de la Universidad Tecnológica de Guadalajara (UTEG) in Guadalajara, Jalisco	Gabriel Alejandro Galaviz González	2	1	Technological University of Guadalajara attack: A 20-year-old man used bladed weapons to kill two administrative staff members and injure an academic coordinator, all employees of the institution, before being arrested.
14 March 2024	Escuela Secundaria General ''Lázaro Cárdenas'' in Boca del Río, Veracruz	Unnamed	0	1	A 12-year-old student, dressed in clothing identical to that of the fictional character ''The Joker'', attacked his teacher with a knife.
30 November 2024	Escuela Preparatoria San Andrés ''Plantel Circunvalación'' in Guadalajara, Jalisco	Brandon Alonso	0	3	San Andrés Preparatory School attack: A 17-year-old student attacked two classmates with a hammer in an attempted massacre before being subdued.
4 March 2025	Escuela Secundaria General ''Elisa Acuña Rosetti'' in Tizayuca, Hidalgo	Unnamed	0	1	A 15-year-old student was stabbed by the father of a classmate after getting into a fight with his son.
21 March 2025	Colegio de Ciencias y Humanidades (CCH) ''Plantel Naucalpan'' de la Universidad Autónoma de México (UNAM) in Naucalpan de Juárez, State of Mexico	Jesús	0	1	A 16-year-old student stabbed a 65-year-old French teacher after ''hearing a voice in his head telling him to do so.''
9 September 2025	Escuela Secundaria Técnica N.° 52 in Delicias, Chihuahua	L.G.Ch.D.	0	1	A 12-year-old female student attacked the mother of a fellow student on the head with a hatchet and switchblade before being restrained.
22 September 2025	Colegio de Ciencias y Humanidades ''Plantel Sur'' (CCH Sur) de la Universidad Autónoma de México (UNAM) in Coyoacán, Mexico City	Lex Ashton Canedo López	1	2	CCH Sur school attack: A student stabbed one of his classmates to death and injured a maintenance worker before jumping off a tall building. He was taken to a hospital and later arrested after being discharged.
19 March 2026	Escuela Secundaria General Lázaro Cárdenas in San Miguel Octopan, Guanajuato	Fabián	0	3	A student attacked three classmates with pepper spray before stabbing one with a bladed weapon. He then fled the scene.
24 March 2026	Instituto de Educación Antón Makárenko in Lázaro Cárdenas, Michoacán	Osmer H.	2	0	2026 Lázaro Cárdenas school shooting: A 15-year-old attempted to gain access to his school with an AR-15–style rifle. When staff impeded his path, he opened fire on them, killing two. He was arrested at the location of the crime.
30 September 2026	Escuela Secundaria General "Esperanza Cabrera" in Santiago de Querétaro, Querétaro	Alex	0	4	A 13-year-old student attacked students at random with two knives, all of whom were left with minor injuries, before being arrested.
1 October 2026	Escuela Secundaria Número 13 in Torreón, Coahuila	Two unnamed	1	6	Two 18-year-old brothers allegedly invaded their former school using bladed weapons and explosive devices, leaving one female teacher dead and several others injured. They were both arrested at the scene of the crime.
26 October 2026	Universidad Autónoma de San Luis Potosí, in San Luis Potosí, San Luis Potosí	Unnamed	0	~5	During a student gathering known as "Noche Bohemia" (Bohemian Night) at a student plaza, an individual from outside the university threw a flammable or pyrotechnic object into a bonfire, according to a report by Canal 7 SLP. The resulting blast scattered embers and left five attendees with first-degree burns.
