= 2026 Calama school stabbing =

Mass stabbing in Chile

- Location: Calama, Chile
- Date: 27 March 2026 c. 10:30 a.m.
- Target: Fundación Educacional Obispo Luis Silva Lezaeta
- Attack type: School stabbing, mass stabbing
- Weapons: Ninjato Coolpool katana; Pepper spray; Multiple knives (used in suicide attempt); Tomahawk-styled axe (unused); Retractable baton (unused); Syringes filled with bleach (unused); Improvised flamethrower (unused)
- Deaths: 1
- Injuries: 5 (including the suspect)
- Motive: Under investigation
- Accused: Hernán Meneses Leal
- Charges: Qualified homicide; Attempted qualified homicide (4 counts); Carrying implements know to be designed to start fires; Possessing devices and components for explosives; Repeated public carrying of a sharp or pointed weapon

On 27 March 2026, an 18-year-old student allegedly carried out a mass stabbing at the Bishop Luis Silva Lezaeta Educational Foundation (Spanish: Fundación Educacional Obispo Luis Silva Lezaeta), in Calama, Chile, killing a school staff member and wounding another four people. According to police, the student carried multiple bladed weapons, gasoline, and an improvised flamethrower.

== Attack ==
At around 10:30 a.m. on 27 March 2026, an 18-year-old student allegedly arrived on school grounds, carrying multiple bladed weapons in his backpack. After readying himself in a bathroom, he stabbed a school staff member in the back and neck, killing her on the spot, before turning to a different staff member and stabbing her as well. After entering the school-s courtyard, he started stabbing students at random, injuring three. He was then tackled by a 15-year-old student, who, with the help of other students, kept him immobilized and tried taking as many weapons away from him as possible. Upon the arrival of police, he attempted to commit suicide by stabbing before being arrested.

In his bag, the suspect carried multiple bladed weapons, including several knives, a tomahawk axe, and a Japanese-styled saber, on which he wrote the surnames of Pekka-Eric Auvinen, Solomon Henderson, Otoya Yamaguchi, and Timur Bekmansurov. He also had a retractable baton, syringes filled with bleach, and a water gun filled with gasoline, meant to act as an improvised flamethrower.

== Victims ==
The sole fatality was identified as María Victoria Reyes Vache, a 59-year-old female school supervisor. Another school supervisor, along with three more 15-year-old students, were injured.

== Suspect ==
The suspect was identified as Hernán Cristóbal Meneses Leal, an 18-year-old student living with his mother and sister who was attending 12th grade. According to a friend, he suffered from bullying and social rejection from the school community. Meneses has been diagnosed with Level 1 autism, major depressive disorder, and moderate mixed anxiety–depressive disorder.

Meneses allegedly detailed his plans in two notebooks, where he claimed that he wanted to kill as many young people as possible to spare them the isolation of growing up into adulthood, though he later amended his plans to simply kill as many people as he could before ending his own life. In these notebooks, he stated he was motivated by "hatred", "capitalism", and "misanthropy", along with admitting to hoping to kill between four and eight 1st graders due to their "purity". He supposedly stole $500,000 CLP (around $540 USD) from his mom, with which he purchased his weapons and gear. Meneses used to frequent different Discord groups where he shared his thoughts, apparently influenced by previous mass murders.

Shortly before the attack, the suspect allegedly posted a video on YouTube showing a photograph of the institution, followed by a red-filter image of himself wearing a balaclava, a supposed reference to the final video posted by Pekka-Eric Auvinen before perpetrating the Jokela school shooting.

== Legal proceedings ==
On 30 March, Hernán Meneses' criminal complaint was filed, where he was charged with one count of consumated qualified homicide, four counts of attempted qualified homicide, and one charge relating to carrying arson weapons. The next day, during his first hearing, he was further charged with possessing devices and components for explosives, and repeated public carrying of a sharp or pointed weapon. A 180-day investigation period was set up, and Meneses was put under pretrial detention at a prison in El Loa.

In July, Meneses' defense filed a motion to suspend the criminal proceedings, citing a possible schizophrenia diagnosis, which would in turn drop all charges against him by reason of insanity. The Guarantee Court of Calama rejected this motion, declaring that there is not yet enough evidence to definitely declare him insane, with the prosecution citing the high level of premeditation as proof of sanity. Meneses was set to remain under custody.

Under Chilean penal law, if convicted of premeditated murder, Meneses faces a minimum term of 15 years' imprisonment and a maximum term of life imprisonment with the possibility of parole after 40 years (the harshest penalty available in the country).

== Aftermath ==
The President of Chile, José Antonio Kast, condemned the attack, stating that "a school cannot be a place of violence", and instructed the heads of the Ministry of Education and Ministry of Security to travel north.

On March 30, students of the institute protested demanding that the attack sets a precedent to apply more security measures nationwide, including the implementation of metal detectors and backpack checks.

The attack led to a wave of copycat crimes throughout Chilean educational instructions. On 30 March, a 15-year-old student in Curicó was arrested after trying to enter his school with a loaded firearm. By 11 April, more than 60 schools were forced to suspend classes due to constant threats of oncoming attacks. On 23 July, two students, aged 10 and 11, were arrested in two different schools (one in Puente Alto and one in Lautaro), as they were found to have been plotting two simultaneous school stabbings in their respective cities. They were carrying knives and an unknown chemical substance.

== See also ==
- List of school attacks in Chile
