= Our Lady of the Conception Cathedral, Campinas =

Metropolitan Cathedral of Our Lady of the Conception
- Catedral Metropolitana Nossa Senhora da Conceição
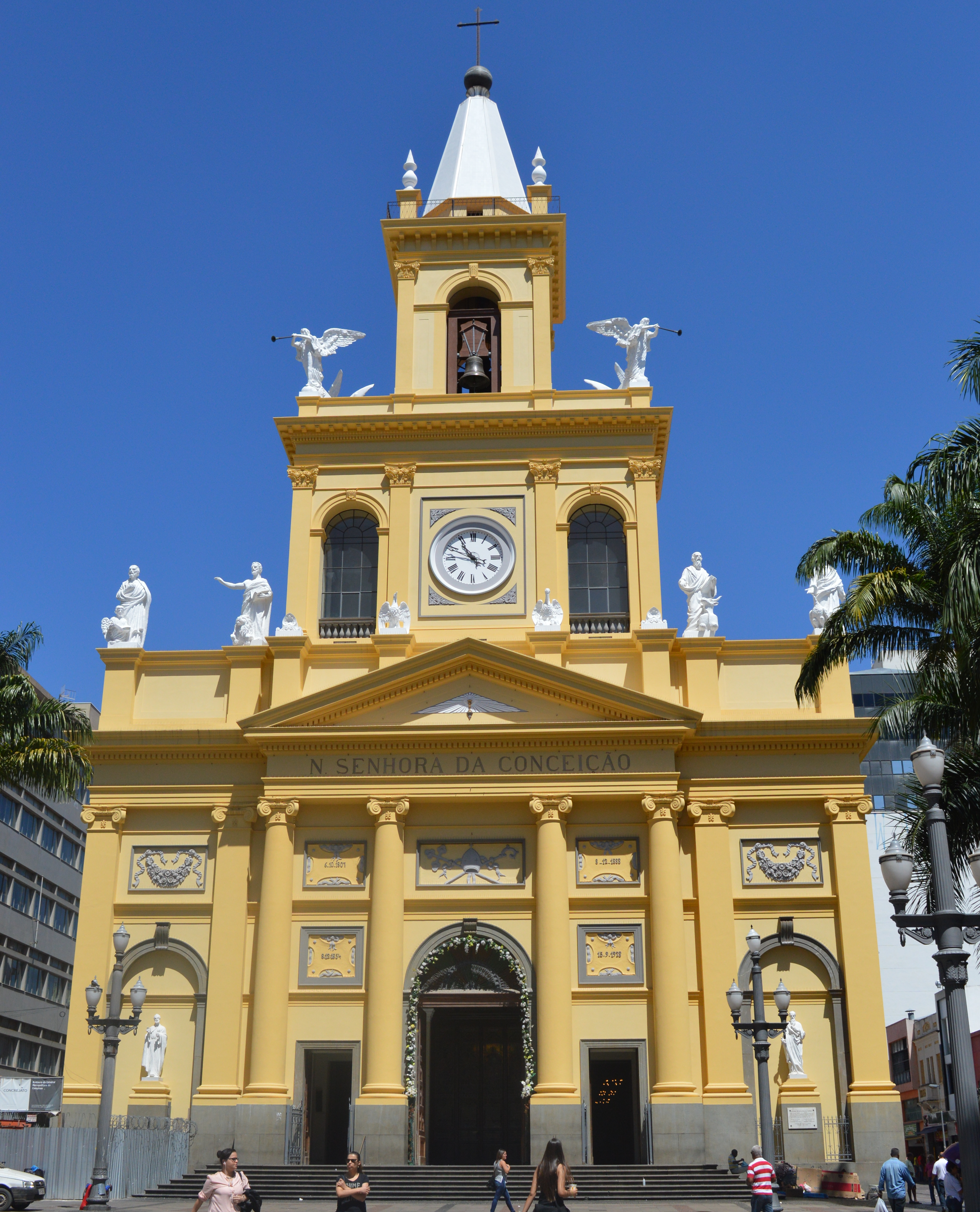
- Façade of the Metropolitan Cathedral of Our Lady of the Conception

- Location of the Metropolitan Cathedral of Our Lady of the Conception
- 22.9060°S 47.0606°W
- Location: Campinas
- Country: Brazil
- Denomination: Roman Catholic Church

History
- Consecrated: 1883; 143 years ago

Architecture
- Functional status: Active

Administration
- Archdiocese: Campinas

National Historic Heritage of Brazil
- Designated: 1969
- Reference no.: 764-T

The Metropolitan Cathedral of Our Lady of the Conception (Portuguese: Catedral Metropolitana Nossa Senhora da Conceição), also Campinas Cathedral, is a Catholic church in Campinas in the state of São Paulo, Brazil. It was inaugurated in 1883 and is located in the Jose Bonifacio Square, popularly known as the Cathedral Square, in the city center. It is dedicated to Our Lady of Conception.

Construction of a new church in Campinas was approved by the City Council in 1807. It was constructed on being the huge bases using rammed earth construction. The structure built by the slaves and blessed by the vicar. It was inaugurated in 1883. The cathedral received new ornaments on the facade during a large-scale restoration in 1923.

== Protected status ==
Our Lady of the Conception Cathedral is listed as a historic structure by the city of Campinas, the state of São Paulo, and by the National Historic and Artistic Heritage Institute in 1969. The structure was registered under the Book of Historical Works, Inscription 764-T.

== See also ==
- Campinas Cathedral shooting
- Roman Catholicism in Brazil
- Our Lady of the Conception

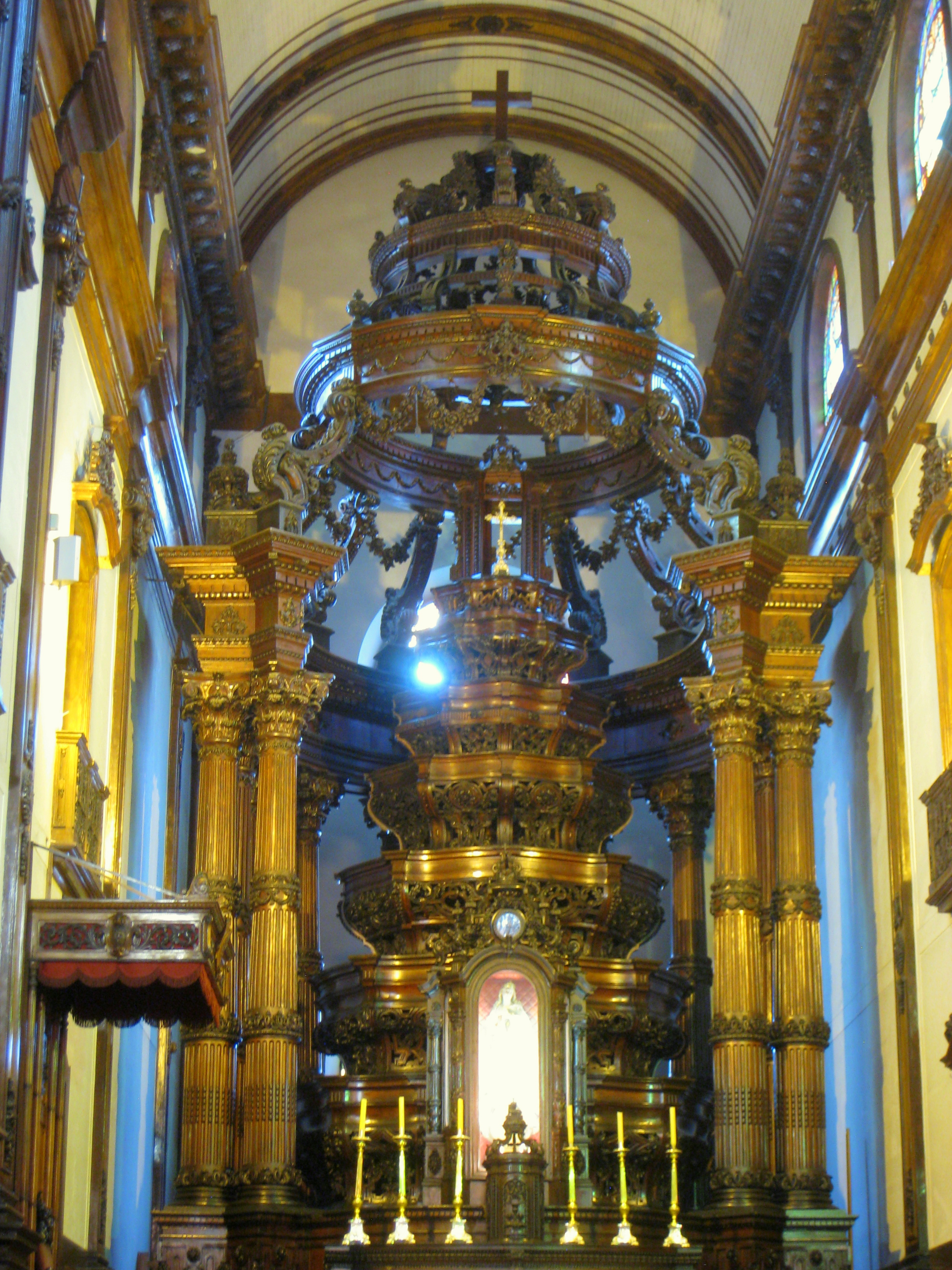
Internal View
