= 2025 Maracanã school shooting =

School shooting in Rio de Janeiro, Brazil

Maracanã school shooting
- Maracanã (Brazil)
- Location: Maracanã, Rio de Janeiro, Brazil
- Date: 28 November 2025; 3:50 p.m.
- Target: Coworkers
- Attack type: School shooting, murder-suicide
- Weapon: .380 ACP Glock semi-automatic pistol
- Deaths: 3 (including the perpetrador)
- Injuries: 0
- Perpetrator: João Antônio Miranda Tello Ramos Gonçalves
- Motive: Under investigation

On 28 November 2025, 47-year-old João Antônio Miranda Tello Ramos Gonçalves broke into administrative offices at the Federal Center for Technological Education of Rio de Janeiro in the Maracanã neighborhood of Rio de Janeiro, Brazil. Antônio, a former employee at the school, shot and killed two school employees before dying from a self-inflicted gunshot wound.

This was the second school shooting with multiple deaths to occur in Rio de Janeiro, with the previous one occurring in 2011, when Wellington Menezes de Oliveira invaded a municipal school and shot and killed 12 people before killing himself.

== Attack ==
At around 3:50 p.m. (UTC−3), former employee João Antônio Miranda Tello Ramos Gonçalves, 47, went to the Celso Suckow da Fonseca Federal Center for Technological Education (Cefet). Armed with a Glock .380 pistol, Antônio broke into one of the administration offices and shot an administrative technician twice. After shooting her, he went to a second room, where he fired two more shots, hitting a psychologist, before going to a third room, where he shot himself in the head.

During the attack, students and staff in the classrooms barricaded themselves in to prevent the shooter from entering. One of the school's teachers continued teaching as normal while the attack was taking place. After the shooter killed himself, they left the rooms.

Police officers and firefighters who arrived at the scene found the two wounded victims and rushed them to the hospital. Later, the shooter was found dead.

=== Victims ===
- Allane de Souza Pedrotti Matos, 41, an administrative technician, was shot in the back of the head and shoulder. She was rescued but died before arriving at the hospital. She had studied at many universities, including the University of Copenhagen.
- Layse Costa Pinheiro, 40, a psychologist at the institution, was shot in the head and chest. She was rescued and taken to the hospital but died two hours after the attack.
- The shooter, João Antônio Miranda Tello Ramos Gonçalves, 47, shot himself in the head. He died at the scene.

== Perpetrator ==
João Antônio Miranda Tello Ramos Gonçalves was later identified as the shooter. He already had mental health issues and had confronted colleagues for being transferred to a different department when he returned to the institution after being on medical leave.

He had arrived at the school in 2019 and had been dismissed in 2020. He had already threatened to kill his colleagues and then commit suicide.

== Aftermath ==
After the attack, the school declared five days of mourning and will remain closed until 5 December of the same year.

Several politicians spoke out after the attack, including Camilo Santana, Sóstenes Cavalcante, Anielle Franco, Talíria Petrone, and even another university offered their condolences.

Two days after the attack, the two fatal victims were buried in two different cemeteries in the capital. The burial of the shooter was not disclosed.

== See also ==
- List of school attacks in Brazil
