= Taiúva school shooting =

2003 school shooting in Brazil

- Taiúva (Brazil)
- Location: 21.12224°S 48.44864°W; Escola Estadual Coronel Benedito Ortiz; Taiúva, São Paulo, Brazil
- Date: 28 January 2003; 23 years ago 2:40 p.m. (BRST)
- Target: Students and teachers
- Attack type: Mass shooting, school shooting
- Weapons: .38-caliber revolver; Knife (unused)
- Deaths: 1 (the perpetrator)
- Injuries: 8
- Perpetrator: Edmar Aparecido de Freitas
- Motive: Bullying

On 28 January 2003, a mass school shooting occurred at Escola Estadual Coronel Benedito Ortiz in Taiúva, São Paulo, Brazil. 18-year-old ex-student Edmar Freitas opened fire on people inside the school, wounding eight people before committing suicide. The shooting was motivated by students bullying Freitas during his time at the school.

== Shooting ==
At 2:40 p.m. (BRST) on 28 January 2003, 18-year-old Edmar Freitas, armed with a .38-caliber revolver and a knife and carrying a bag of ammunition, scaled a 2.7 metres (8.9 ft) side wall and entered the school courtyard, where around 50 students had gathered during passing period. He opened fire inside the courtyard at random, wounding five students, one of whom, 17-year-old Pedro Russo Júnior, was rendered quadriplegic. Freitas then walked into the school and continued firing, wounding a teacher and a sixth student. Freitas headed to the janitor's office and shot and wounded the janitor, then pointed his revolver at the janitor's wife, Maria do Carmo, who begged him not to shoot her. Sparing do Carmo, Freitas turned his gun on himself and shot himself in the ear, dying instantly.

Contemporary reports suggested that Freitas fired indiscriminately, although a teacher suggested in 2019 that he specifically shot some victims and spared other people. Diário do Grande ABC also reported that the gunman had attempted to take a staff member hostage.

== Perpetrator ==
Edmar Aparecido de Freitas (5 December 1984 – 28 January 2003), aged 18, was an ex-student of the school, having graduated in 2002. Classmates stated that Freitas was normal, but shy and withdrawn. In his early teenage years, he was bullied at school for his obesity, which continued even after he had lost weight. Classmates reportedly said that Freitas talked about shooting people and blowing up the school, although investigators did not confirm these suggestions.

Investigators searching Freitas's house discovered a .22-caliber revolver and magazines covering Nazi Germany and Adolf Hitler, subjects Freitas was known to have interest in. They determined that he committed the shooting due to bullying and anger at his classmates.

=== Aftermath ===
In 2005, a regional judge ruled that the school's security was inadequate at the time of the shooting, stating that no guard was present to stop the shooter. The Brazilian government was ordered to compensate 305 days of wages to the victims for physical and mental damage. The government filed an appeal in 2006, which was still being deliberated as of 2011.

Wellington Menezes de Oliveira, the perpetrator of the 2011 Rio de Janeiro school shooting, mentioned Freitas in a video, along with Seung-Hui Cho and an Australian teenager who retaliated against bullying.

== See also ==
- Rio de Janeiro school shooting
- Suzano Massacre
- Macaúbas School shooting
