= 2026 Lázaro Cárdenas school shooting =

School shooting in Lázaro Cárdenas, Michoacán, México

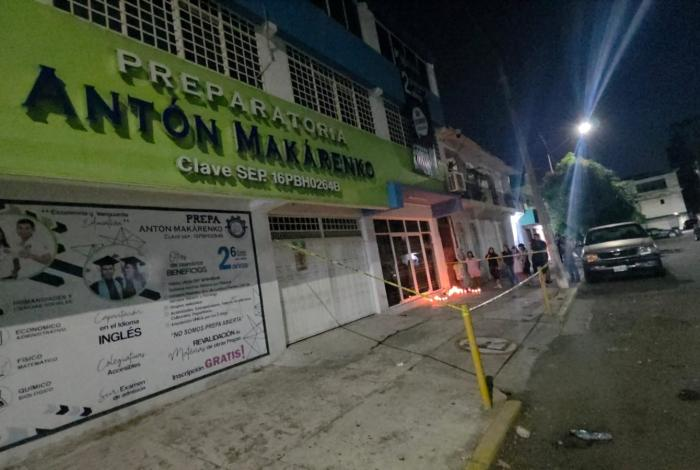
- Aftermath of the shooting outside the Antón Makárenko Preparatory School
- Location: Lázaro Cárdenas, Michoacán, Mexico
- Date: 24 March 2026 c. 9:30 AM (UTC-6)
- Attack type: School shooting; double homicide
- Weapon: 5.56 AR-15–style rifle (PMF)
- Deaths: 2
- Injuries: 0
- Perpetrator: Osmer H.
- Motive: Under Investigation

On 24 March 2026, two women were killed in a school shooting at the Antón Makárenko Educational Institute in Lázaro Cárdenas, Michoacán, Mexico. The perpetrator was identified as a 15-year-old male named Osmer H. It is the deadliest school shooting in the history of Mexico.

== Background ==
Michoacán has long been one of Mexico's most violent states, primarily in extortion, kidnapping and other criminal activities. School shootings are rare in Mexico despite a high level of organized crime.

== Shooting ==
At approximately 9:30 AM, 15-year-old Osmer H. attempted to enter the school armed with a high-powered assault rifle. Two female staff members prevented him from entering the building, at which point he shot at them multiple times, killing them both. He was subsequently apprehended by students, who tied him up and then turned him in when police arrived. He supposedly carried 67 rounds, shooting 24 of them during the attack. Following reports of gunfire, the National Guard and municipal police carried out an operation at the school, according to the Security Ministry.

== Victims ==
The victims were identified as two female staff members, 36-year-old Marìa del Rosario Sagrero Chávez and 37-year-old Tatiana Madrigal Bedolla.

== Perpetrator ==
The 15-year-old shooter was identified as Osmer H. He took the weapon, an AR-15–style rifle, along with a singular high-capacity magazine, used in the crime from his stepfather, who was a member of the Mexican Navy. Shortly before the shooting, he posted content on Instagram relating to the incel subculture, suggesting a motive, along with multiple self-recorded photographs and videos of himself holding the rifle. His profile used the name "vodka.om", an alleged reference to "VoDKa", the username used by Dylan Klebold, one of the two perpetrators of the Columbine High School massacre.

The state prosecutor stated the intention to charge the perpetrator as an adult, citing the gravity of the crime along with past cases of underage hitmen being prosecuted as such.

== Sentencing ==
On 17 July 2026, the perpetrator was sentenced to three years' incarceration (the maximum permissible under Michoacán's specialized code of adolescent justice, to be served at a juvenile facility in the state capital, Morelia) under the charges of feminicide and carrying a firearm reserved for the exclusive use of the Army, as well as the compensation of 3,280,769 pesos in restitution to the victims' families.

== See also ==
- List of school attacks in Mexico
- Colegio Cervantes shooting: school shooting in Torreón, Coahuila, in which an 11-year-old boy killed one teacher and injured six others before committing suicide
