= Iquique military school shooting =

2019 military school shooting in Chile

- Location: Armored Cavalry School, Iquique, Chile
- Date: 16 March 2019; 17:30
- Attack type: Double murder, school shooting, murder-suicide
- Weapon: Service rifle
- Deaths: 3 (including the perpetrator)
- Perpetrator: Marco Velásquez González
- Motive: Depression, retaliation for bullying

On 16 March 2019, 18-year-old Chilean cadet Marco Antonio Velásquez González opened fire on his superiors at the Armored Cavalry School in Iquique, Chile with his service rifle, killing two people before committing suicide as well. Velásquez had frequently suffered bullying from his peers and superiors at the school, and was diagnosed with depression, having even attempted to commit suicide once previously. The incident has served as an extreme example of the consequences of physical, mental and sexual abuse in the Chilean military, both by soldiers and higher-ups.

== Background ==
Marco Antonio Velásquez González was born in Iquique to Marco Velásquez, a bus driver, and Claudia González, a hairdresser. He originally applied to join military training when he was just 17, but had been turned down due to failing his psychological exams. He finally joined the army in April 2018.

Throughout recent years, many cases had come out about frequent abuses of young cadets in the Chilean Armed Forces, including routine beatings, stabbings, and rapes. He suffered frequent bullying during his training, often getting into fistfights that were there recorded and uploaded online. At one point, various classmates of his made up a rumor that he had stolen several cell phones, something that they allegedly knew that was false, as an excuse to beat him up with large sticks.

Velásquez had apparently shown multiple signs of depression, including a suicide attempt in December 2018, when he put his service rifle in his mouth and was preparing to shoot himself, but a fellow conscript found him in the act and talked him down. As such, he was subject to professional evaluations and from both military institutions and the Psychiatric Unit of the Regional Hospital of Iquique, where he was diagnosed with major depressive disorder. He was discharged on December 24, 2018, spending Christmas at his parents' house. No further measures were taken. His army superiors refused to discharge him, believing him to be exaggerating his symptoms.

== Shooting ==
On March 12, at 9:35 p.m., Velásquez left a final Facebook post, saying declaring that he was "in confinement for life", with an attached image of himself with a phrase from a song by the Venezuelan rapper Canserbero: "Of life as a movie and its tragedy, comedy and fiction", with three broken heart emojis next to it.

At 5:30 p.m. on 16 March 2019, Velásquez grabbed his service rifle and shot Sergeant Fernando Zamorano Fuentes, 39 years old at the time of the attack, four times, killing him on the spot, and then shooting Corporal Pedro Benavidez Ramírez once. He then committed suicide. In total, eight shots were fired during the incident. In the audio recordings of the commotion following the shooting, his bunk mates can be heard both insulting Velásquez and Zamorano for not managing to reach his service pistol in time.

== Aftermath ==
The first to find out about the death was his father, who was informed by a call sent out by the military school. His mother found out that same day on television news. His parents, along with his sister, identified his deceased body later that same day. The Armed Forces of Chile financed his cremation.

The incident is the third fatal school shooting in Chilean history, following the 1999 Valparaíso school shootings and another incident occurred in 2006 in Santa Juana.
