= CCH Sur school attack =

2025 school stabbing in Mexico City

CCH Sur campus attack
- Location: Mexico City, Mexico
- Date: 22 September 2025
- Target: Students and staff at CCH Sur
- Attack type: School stabbing
- Weapons: M48 tactical kama; 2 karambit knives (unused); Pepper spray; Stun gun (unused)
- Deaths: 1
- Injuries: 2 (including the suspect)
- Motive: Under investigation
- Accused: Lex Ashton Cañedo López
- Charges: Qualified homicide; Attempted qualified homicide

On 22 September 2025, a stabbing attack occurred at the Colegio de Ciencias y Humanidades (CCH) Sur campus of the National Autonomous University of Mexico in Mexico City, where a 16-year-old student was killed and a 65-year-old janitor was injured. The suspect, a 19-year-old student identified as Lex Ashton Cañedo López, was arrested after attempting to commit suicide by jumping off an on-campus building.

== Attack ==
On 22 September 2025, a 19-year-old student allegedly entered the CCH Sur campus located in Coyoacán, Mexico City. The perpetrator supposedly approached a 16-year-old student, who was with his girlfriend, and attacked him with a farming weapon, causing fatal injuries. He then chased after the victim's girlfriend, who ran away, screaming for help.

A 65-year-old security guard attempted to intervene and was also injured during the attack, being sprayed in the eyes with pepper spray and then stabbed in the head.

After the assault, the suspect attempted to flee and jumped from a building within the campus, sustaining injuries to his legs before being taken into custody.

== Aftermath ==
The attack caused widespread alarm within the National Autonomous University of Mexico community. Classes at the CCH Sur campus were suspended, and several other campuses temporarily shifted to remote learning while security measures were reviewed.

Students and parents organized protests demanding improved campus security and justice for the victim. The incident also sparked national debate about violence in schools and the influence of online extremist communities.

University authorities later introduced additional safety measures, including access controls and surveillance systems.

== Suspect ==
The suspect was identified as Lex Ashton Cañedo López, a 19-year-old student. Hours before carrying out the attack, he alledgedly made posts on Facebook announcing his plan and showing his arsenal on several incel-related communities.

== Legal proceedings ==
The suspect was hospitalized following injuries sustained during his escape attempt and was later transferred to detention in Mexico City. Prosecutors charged him with homicide, attempted homicide, and causing injury.

Judicial proceedings began in October 2025, with a judge evaluating evidence and determining whether to proceed to trial. The suspect's trial began in November 2026, after the suspect had been temporarily declared incompetent to stand trial due to mental health concerns four times. He faces one count of qualified homicide and one count of attempted qualified homicide
