= 2022 Aracruz school shootings =

Spree shooting at two schools in Aracruz, Brazil, in 2022

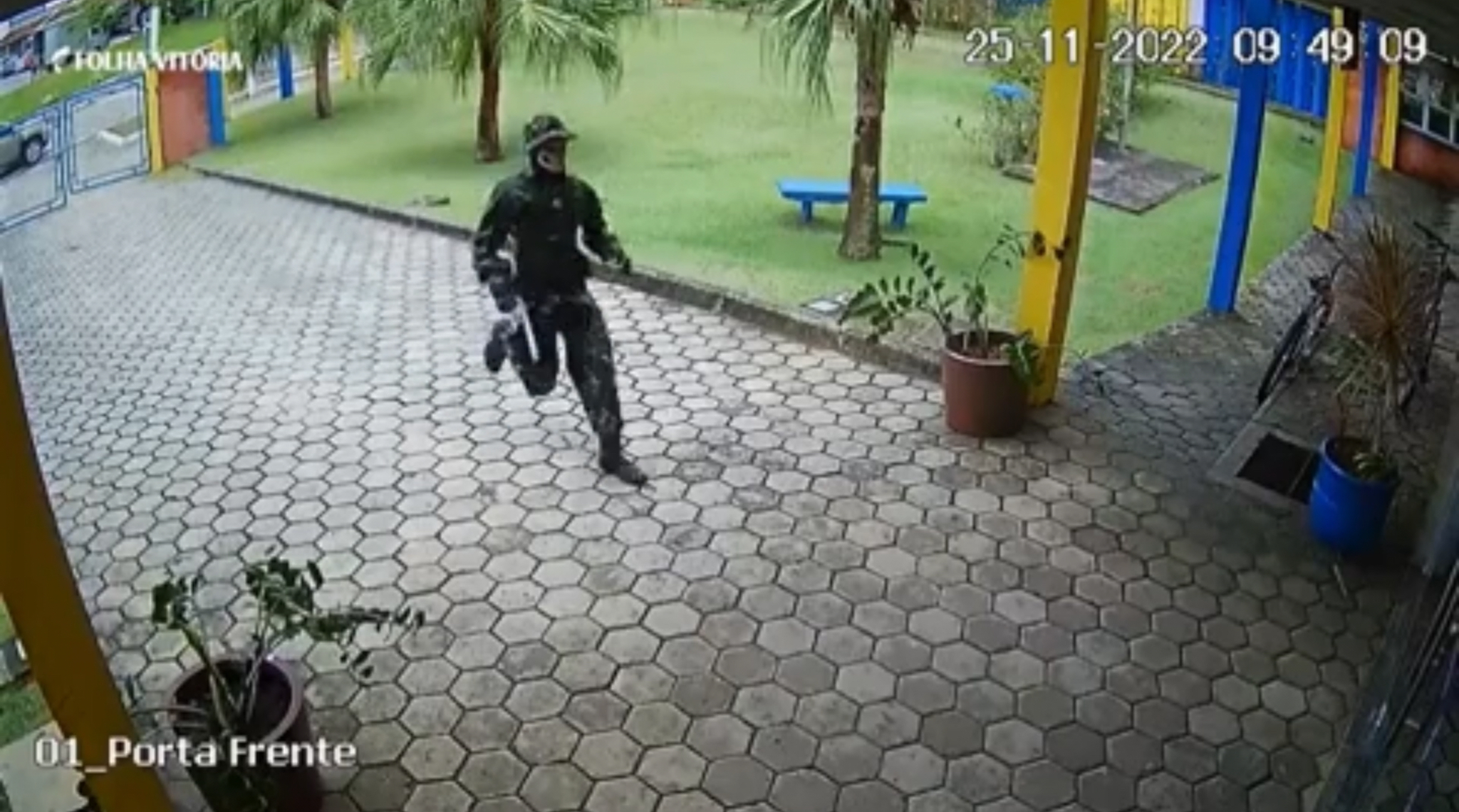
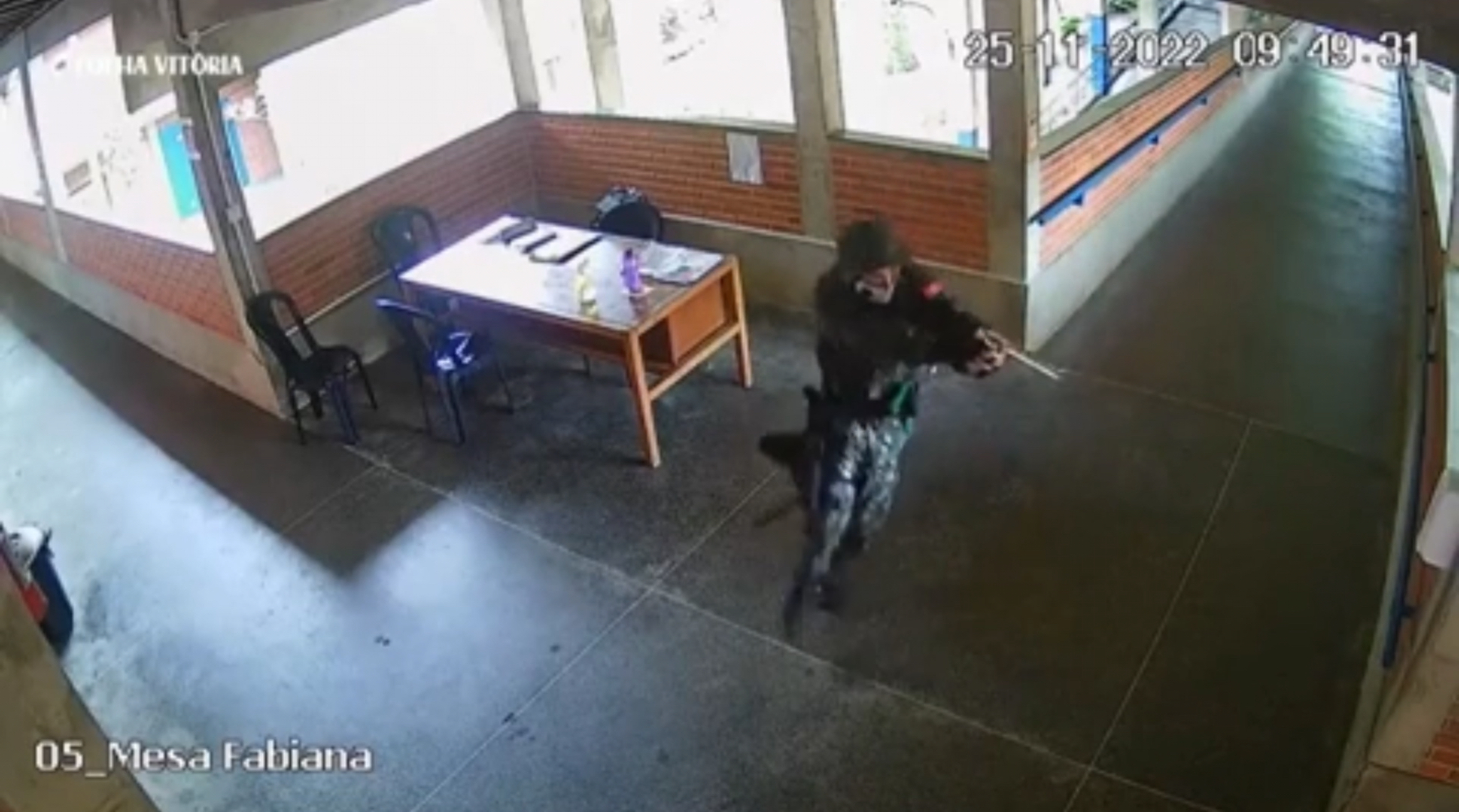
- The shooter approaching the entrance of the second location (top). The shooter opening fire (bottom).
- Location: Aracruz, Espírito Santo, Brazil
- Date: November 25, 2022; 3 years ago c. 9:30 – c. 9:50 a.m. (BRT, UTC−03:00)
- Target: Two different schools
- Attack type: Mass shooting, school shooting, spree shooting, mass murder
- Weapons: Taurus Armas PT 24/7 .40 caliber semi-automatic pistol; Taurus Armas RT 838 .38 caliber revolver; Hatchet (unused; left in his belt)
- Deaths: 4
- Injuries: 11
- Perpetrator: Gabriel Rodrigues Castiglioni
- Motive: Neo-Nazism, retaliation for school bullying

On November 25, 2022, two school shootings occurred at two different schools in Aracruz, Espírito Santo, Brazil. A 16-year-old former student of one of the schools, Gabriel Rodrigues Castiglioni, shot four people to death, including a 12-year-old girl. Eleven others were left wounded, and the gunman fled before later being arrested at his family's residence, approximately four hours after the shootings.

== Background ==
Gabriel Rodrigues Castiglioni was reportedly active in online neo-Nazi communities which promoted accelerationism, including Terrorgram. In addition to this, the attire he wore during the attacks bore a strong resemblance to the uniforms worn by members of the terrorist organization Atomwaffen Division. A homemade flag of Nazi Germany was also worn on the shoulder sleeve of Rodrigues' camouflage. He also took inspiration from the Columbine High School massacre.

The weapons used in the attacks belonged to Rodrigues' father, a Military Police lieutenant. He claimed to have begun planning the attack since 2019, when he was bullied at his school. Rodrigues would handle his father's guns in secret and taught himself how to use them using internet tutorials.

== Shootings ==
The shootings began at around 9:30 a.m. and occurred at two schools located on the same street. During the shootings, the gunman wore camouflaged clothing, an armband with a swastika, a mask, and a bucket hat. He broke into Primo Bitti Elementary and Middle School, a public school serving elementary and middle school students, after destroying the two locks to the side entrance gate with wrenches and a bolt cutter, respectively. There, he used his .40-caliber pistol to shoot 11 people at the teacher's lounge, murdering two teachers at the scene. A third teacher succumbed to the wounds she was left with and died a day later in the care of medics. Rodrigues was standing in the doorway and reloaded once when he shot up the teacher's lounge.

Location of Aracruz within Espírito Santo state

Afterwards, the gunman drove to the Educational Center Praia de Coqueiral, a private school. Entering at 9:49 a.m. through the unlocked gates, he shot two people and additionally murdered a 6th-grade 12-year-old girl. He used the revolver while at the school. After firing eight shots and struggling to reload his revolver, Rodrigues fled again a minute later and remained at large for approximately four hours, during which he stayed at his home. During his time at large, he stayed in his family's residence, stored the weapons out of sight, ate lunch with his parents, and went with them to their family's beach property. His parents found out about their son's actions later that day, when the Military Police arrested him at their home. The police later issued a statement confirming that a suspect was in custody.

== Victims ==
The victims of the attacks were identified by multiple news sources:

1. Selena Zagrillo, 12
2. Maria da Penha Pereira de Melo Banhos, 48
3. Cybelle Passos Bezerra Lara, 45
4. Flavia Amoss Merçon Leonardo, 38

== Aftermath and reactions ==
After the shootings, Aracruz announced the suspension of all classes at municipal schools. The mayor of Aracruz said the murders were "the largest tragedy this city has ever seen". Renato Casagrande, the governor of Espírito Santo, said he would pay attention to the case with "much regret and sadness". He also declared three days of official mourning in the state. President-elect Luiz Inácio Lula da Silva posted on Twitter, "My solidarity to the families of the victims in this absurd tragedy."

In December 2022, Rodrigues Castiglioni was sentenced to three years' juvenile detention, the harshest criminal penalty available for minors in Brazil. In November 2025, 19-year-old Castiglioni was placed on supervised release after completing his juvenile detention sentence.

== See also ==
- List of massacres in Brazil
- List of school attacks in Brazil
- 2011 Realengo school shooting
- 2019 Suzano school shooting
- List of rampage killers (school massacres)
