= Campinas Cathedral shooting =

2018 attack in São Paulo, Brazil

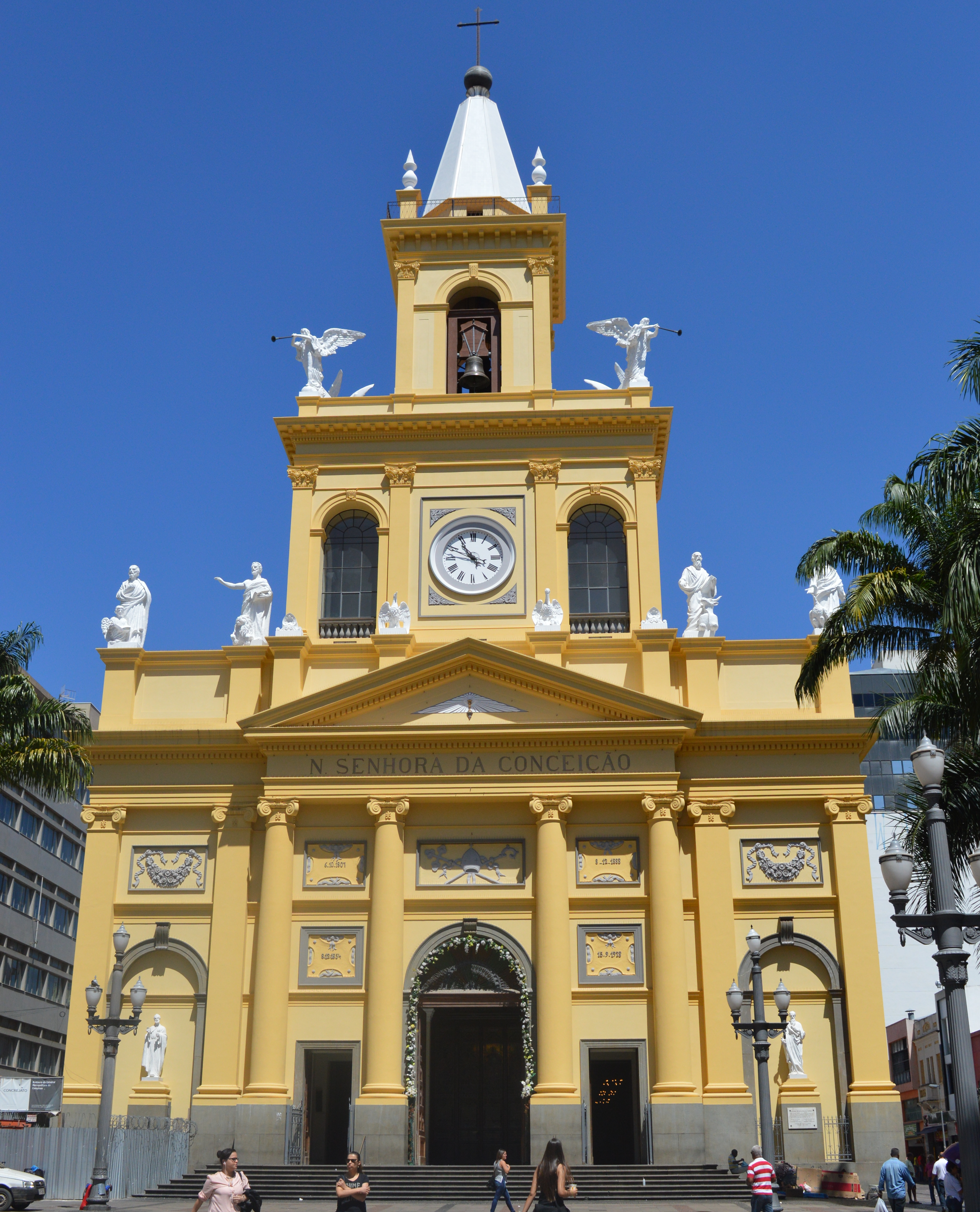
- Campinas Cathedral

- Location: 22.906°S 47.0606°W; Catholic cathedral in Campinas, State of São Paulo brazil
- Date: 11 December 2018; 7 years ago Around 13:25 (BRST (UTC-2))
- Attack type: Mass murder, mass shooting, murder-suicide
- Weapons: CZ-75B 9mm Semi-automatic pistol; .38 Special Taurus Armas Model RT88 revolver (Unused)
- Deaths: 6 (including the perpetrator)
- Injuries: 4
- Perpetrator: Euler Fernando Grandolpho
- Motive: Uncertain, Possibly: Paranoia; Homicidal ideation; Delusions of persecution; Suicidal ideation

On 11 December 2018, a gunman opened fire in the Metropolitan Cathedral in the Brazilian city of Campinas, São Paulo, killing five people and wounding four more.

== Incident ==
CCTV still of Euler Fernando Grandolpho opening fire on the Campinas Cathedral

The shooter entered the cathedral around 13:25 BRST (15:25 GMT). The officiating priest had left the cathedral prior to the attack and the suspect was not recognized by any of the church officials. The suspect entered the church while the Mass was still underway and sat in the back and watched the service for a while, before he began to fire his weapon. He killed four worshippers and injured another four. Police in the plaza outside of the church responded to the gunshots, and the gunman was hit in the side by police, before he committed suicide.

One day after the massacre, another victim had succumbed to his injuries at the hospital, and the fifth victim of this massacre was revealed, Heleno Severo Alves, 84 years old.

The incident was documented on the surveillance footage from inside the cathedral and allowed the police to review the timeline of the incident.

The PM works with the hypothesis that the crime was premeditated, as the shooter used enough ammunition to kill the victims and left only one bullet to commit suicide. The attack had been planned since 2008, according to entries in a diary found in the shooter's home. The motivation for the attack, however, is still unknown and Euler had no prior record with the police.

== Victims ==
The five victims of the massacre were all men between the ages of 38 and 84. The five victims of the massacre are (in order of age):

- Cristofer Gonçalves dos Santos - 38 years old;
- Sidnei Vitor Monteiro - 39 years old (Note: Sidnei's mother was injured in the massacre);
- Elpídio Alves Coutinho - 67 years old;
- José Eudes Gonzaga Ferreira - 68 years old and;
- Heleno Severo Alves - 84 years old.

== Perpetrator ==
Police released the name of the perpetrator as Euler Fernando Grandolpho, a 49-year-old systems analyst with no known criminal record.

According to the police, despite the shooter's profession being a systems analyst, his civil identification form states that he was an advertiser. Grandolpho also worked as a prosecutor's assistant at the Public Ministry of the State of São Paulo and was exonerated in July 2014. A profile on a social network says that he studied at UNIP and Technical High School of Campinas.

Grandolpho had no criminal record, but he filed police reports for persecution and insults. According to the Civil Police, the family reported that the shooter was quite a recluse, used to stay in his room, rarely left the house and was undergoing treatment for depression. Family members also feared he would "commit suicide." There were no relationships between the shooter and the victims, and he was not a regular at the Metropolitan Cathedral.

== Aftermath ==
A Mass was held in the cathedral the day after the incident to honor the victims with Father Rafael Capelato stating; "We know that you, family members, are crying - and so are we."

Campinas Mayor Jonas Donizetti declared three days of mourning in the city and used Twitter to express his condolences and horror about the crime.

The elected governor of the state of São Paulo, João Doria, lamented the death of the victims on social media. "My solidarity with the families of the four victims who were cruelly murdered in the Metropolitan Cathedral of Campinas that afternoon."

President Michel Temer stated, through his Twitter account, that he was "deeply shaken" by the news. "Deeply shaken by the news of this crime committed inside the Campinas Cathedral, I offer my condolences to the families of the victims. And I pray that the injured have a speedy recovery," he wrote.

Through a post on Facebook, the Archdiocese of Campinas lamented what happened: "We count on everyone's prayers in this moment of deep pain." The priest who said mass right before the attack, Amaury Thomazzi, asked in a video posted on the internet for prayers for the victims, for the shooter himself, and asked for the intercession of the Immaculate Conception for the situation.

Pope Francis sent a telegram to the Archdiocese of Campinas, lamenting the tragedy. The pontiff asked everyone to strive to forgive and make “love prevail over hate and revenge”. In the text, the Pope "invites everyone, in the face of this moment of pain, to find comfort and strength in the Resurrected Jesus, asking God that hope does not fade in this hour of testing." The telegram on behalf of Francis was signed by the Vatican Secretary of State, Cardinal Pietro Parolin.

== See also ==
- Campinas massacre (31 December 2016)
- Rio de Janeiro school shooting (7 April 2011)
- 2018 Strasbourg attack (11 December 2018), an unrelated attack which happened on the same day
