= Colegio Americano del Noreste shooting =

2017 school shooting in Mexico

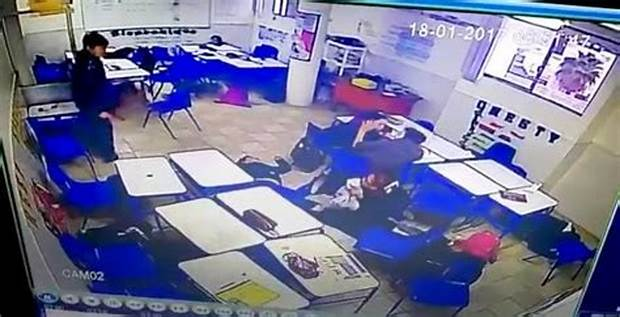
- A CCTV still of the Colegio Americano del Noreste shooting, where 4 people were shot, one fatally.
- Location: 25.6221°N 100.2885°W; Monterrey, Nuevo León, Mexico
- Date: January 18, 2017; 9 years ago c. 08:51 a.m. (CST; UTC−06:00)
- Attack type: Murder-suicide, school shooting
- Weapon: .22-caliber semi-automatic handgun
- Deaths: 2 (including the perpetrator)
- Injuries: 3
- Perpetrator: Federico Guevara Elizondo
- Motive: Depression; Suicidal ideation Mental illness

On January 18, 2017, 16-year-old high school student Federico Guevara opened fire with a .22 LR caliber handgun inside a classroom at Colegio Americano del Noreste in Monterrey, Nuevo León, Mexico. Guevara then attempted to commit suicide by shooting himself but missed impacting his chin, then ran out of ammunition. Students Ana Cecilia Ramos and Luis Fernando Martínez, both 14 years old, and 24-year-old teacher Cecilia Cristina Solís, suffered critical head injuries. They were listed in critical condition. After two months, Cecilia died in the hospital. 14-year-old Mariel Chávez suffered an arm injury but was declared stable. Guevara had psychological problems.

The perpetrator eventually committed suicide by gunshot and died several hours later at a Monterrey hospital after suffering brain death.

== Background ==
Due to the notorious increase in violence and insecurity affecting several states in Mexico, beginning in 2007, the Secretariat of Public Education of Mexico implemented in the states of Baja California, Chihuahua, Federal District, Guerrero, Jalisco, Mexico, Michoacán, Sinaloa and Quintana Roo, the Safe School Program, which aims to promote environments of security and healthy coexistence, favorable for the improvement of learning, as well as the practice of "civic and ethical values". Among the actions foreseen by the program, "Safe Backpack" was included, an operation held at the entrance of schools consisting of reviewing the students' backpacks in order to detect the entry of weapons or drugs to the facilities.

At the time of the attack, according to Aldo Fasci, prosecutor of the state of Nuevo León, the operation in that state was being applied in 90% of public schools, but in certain private schools, as in the case of the school involved, there were no checks, due mainly to complaints from parents.

== Shooting ==
At 8:51 a.m., at the Colegio Americano del Noreste (English: Northeastern American College), Guevara (Born 2 Jan 2001), who was seated at his desk, took out a .22 caliber firearm and shot at one of his classmates at point-blank range, then shot his teacher Cecilia Solís and other peers, between 13 and 14 years of age. He then attempted to shoot himself in the right temple but failed as he missed, then the firearm ran out of ammunition. He reloaded the weapon with cartridges stored in his backpack and shot himself in the chin. He died later in the hospital.

A video of the attack, recorded by the closed circuit installed in the classroom, was published by Mexican newspaper Reforma. Due to the material circulating fast on social networks such as Twitter and Facebook, the Mexican Secretary of the Interior, Miguel Angel Osorio Chong declared that it had instructed to the verification of the images and videos of the event considering the dignity of the victims. Governor Rodríguez Calderón called the action of sharing the video as "perverse and morbid", while the state prosecutor said that there would be punishment to whoever leaked the video to the media.

== Reactions ==
The then President of Mexico, Enrique Peña Nieto, through his Twitter account, lamented the event "as a parent and as president." Later, in a video, the President stated that security in Mexican classrooms was a national competition, "and what happens in our classrooms, is not only an issue that involves managers and teachers, it is a concern of all of us."

The governor of the state of Nuevo León, Jaime Rodríguez Calderón, lamented the shooting, expressed solidarity with the families of the victims and called for parents to care for their children, "watch what they do, what they feel, what they say, let our families become stronger, let us not let violence gain us and let's return to values."

The country's Secretary of Public Education, Aurelio Nuño Mayer, described the incident as "unacceptable violence," and assured that it will follow up on the case.

Enrique Graue Wiechers, rector of the National Autonomous University of Mexico, said that the event could be caused by a society "that is losing many values."

Several senators lamented the facts, calling for the education of families in the homes and to implement programs of revisions of backpacks. In this regard, lawmaker Angélica de la Peña rejected the claims appealing to a measure that criminalizes children in school age.

On the night of January 18, students' families and relatives arrived at the school's gate, where they placed flowers, candles and white balloons.

== Aftermath ==
A day after the shooting, Google joined the support and added a little black ribbon as a backing for the tragedy and victim families.

Also a day after the shooting, the Facebook account of the school was hacked by Facebook group "Legión Holk". Mexican authorities have since stated they believe these are apocryphal accounts.

== See also ==
- List of school attacks in Mexico
- List of attacks related to secondary schools
