= Campinas massacre =

2016 mass shooting in São Paulo State, Brazil

- Campinas.
- Location: 22°54′22.6″S 47°05′40.2″W; Campinas, São Paulo State, Brazil
- Date: 31 December 2016; 9 years ago Around 23:50 (BRST (UTC-02:00))
- Attack type: Familicide, Mass murder–suicide, Filicide
- Weapons: Walther P5 9mm semi-automatic pistol; Improvised Explosive Devices (unused)
- Deaths: 13 (including the perpetrator)
- Injuries: 3
- Perpetrator: Sidnei Ramis de Araujo
- Motive: Custody Battle

Around 23:50 BRST on 31 December 2016 (1:50 GMT on 1 January 2017), a man named Sidnei Araujo entered a home where a New Year's party was taking place and opened fire at the gathering with a Walther P5 9mm semi-automatic handgun. Araujo killed 12 people, including his estranged wife and his eight-year-old son, and wounded three others before committing suicide by shooting himself. Although the crime is under investigation, the motive is believed to be anger over separation with his wife. A recording of Araujo was later found in his car in which he apologized for something that would happen, without indicating specifically what it would be. It remains tied with the 2011 Rio de Janeiro school shooting as the second-deadliest mass shooting by a lone gunman in Brazilian history, both surpassed only by the 1997 Santo Antônio do Potengi massacre.

== See also ==
- List of massacres in Brazil
- Campinas Cathedral shooting (11 December 2018)
