= Colegio Cervantes shooting =

School shooting in Mexico in 2020

- Colegio Cervantes shooting (Coahuila) Colegio Cervantes shooting (Mexico)
- Location: 25°32′33.22″N 103°25′51.23″W; Torreón, Coahuila, Mexico
- Date: 10 January 2020 c. 8:40 a.m. – c. 8:43 a.m. (CST)
- Attack type: Mass shooting, murder-suicide, school shooting
- Weapons: .25-caliber Raven MP-25 pistol; .40-caliber Glock 22 Gen 3 pistol
- Deaths: 2 (including the perpetrator)
- Injuries: 6
- Perpetrator: José Ángel Ramos Betts
- Motive: Columbine massacre inspired attack

On 10 January 2020, an 11-year-old student identified as José Ángel Ramos Betts, (Note: In this Mexican name, the surname is Ramos and the second or maternal family name is Betts.) armed with two guns, opened fire at the facilities of Colegio Cervantes Campus Bosque, a private school in Torreón, Coahuila, Mexico, killing a teacher and wounding another teacher along with five other students, before taking his own life. The assailant wore a white t-shirt that read "Natural selection" and pants with black suspenders, referencing Eric Harris, one of the perpetrators of the Columbine High School massacre.

== Events ==
At 8:00 a.m. on 10 January 2020, Ramos arrived at the institution with two weapons in his backpack: a semi-automatic .40 caliber and another .25 caliber, both owned by his grandfather. At 8:20 a.m., he asked his teacher for permission to go to the bathroom. About 15 minutes later, after noticing that he was taking too long, she went to look for him. Around 8:40 a.m., he left the bathroom having changed clothes and armed himself with the two guns. María Assaf Medina, Ramos's English teacher, confronted him and asked him to stop shooting. Media outlets stated that he attacked while dressed in white t-shirt with the words: "Natural Selection", suspenders and black pants, clothes similar to those worn by Eric Harris, one of the perpetrators of the Columbine High School massacre. Before firing, he said "Hoy va a ser el día" ("Today is going to be the day"). First, he started firing at the physical education teacher and five other classmates, injuring all of them. Then, he shot Medina in the left eye, who died instantly, and finally, he turned the gun to himself in the right eye, and committed suicide at around 8:43 a.m The assailant discharged nine bullets during the attack, including the suicide shot.

When they heard the shots, teachers from other classrooms ordered their students to take shelter. After the shooting, the authorities cordoned off the area and initiated investigations. Witnesses stated that the child was a student of academic excellence and no previous problems had been reported with him.

== Reactions ==
Mexican President Andrés Manuel López Obrador lamented the event and gave his condolences to the families of the victims, urging the strengthening of school safety and the "Mochila segura" ("Safe Backpack") program while insisting that re-enforcing family values are more important. The "Mochila segura" program is an initiative that reviews the students' backpacks at the entrance of schools in order to detect the possible entry of weapons and drugs. López Obrador's wife Beatriz Gutiérrez Müller also lamented the shooting, and stated that the review of backpacks and childhood behavior should start at home.

The Governor of Coahuila Miguel Ángel Riquelme Solís said that after the shooting, the Safe Backpack program would be mandatory in all private schools in the state. In regards to the shooter's attire, Governor Riquelme Solís stated in a press conference that it was believed to be due to the influence of the video game Natural Selection. After the theory that the shooting could have been committed because of a video game was roundly rejected by experts such as Andrew Przybylsi of Oxford Internet Institute, Feggy Ostrosky Shejet of the National Autonomous University of Mexico (UNAM), Ernesto Piedras of The Competitive Intelligence Unit, Erik Salazar of College of Psychology of UNAM, and several media reports noted that the phrase "Natural selection" was more likely to be a reference to the Columbine High School massacre. After this came to light, the governor retracted his initial statement.

Secretary of the Interior Olga Sánchez Cordero called on the social networks Facebook and Twitter to remove the images of the shooting that circulated online.

== Perpetrator ==
Once Governor Miguel Riquelme Solís's theory that the 11-year-old had committed the shooting because of a video game was rejected, investigators looked at the shooter's background and environment.

José Ángel Ramos Betts was born on 8 April 2008. His mother died in surgery a few years later. His father, 37-year-old José Ángel Ramos Jiménez, had spent time in prison for trafficking methamphetamine in El Paso, Texas, U.S., but had recently been released. At the time of the shooting, the child had been living with his paternal grandparents. His grandfather's bank account was frozen because of "irregular money transfers" involving millions of dollars between the two men. Ramos Betts's 58-year-old grandfather, José Ángel Ramos Saucedo, also had a record of drug trafficking. He had additionally owned six luxury vehicles in two years, and one grandmother had owned three luxury vehicles and was also involved in large money transfers. Ramos Betts's maternal grandmother had been murdered.

The Coahuila prosecutor's office found his grandfather's cell phone, and conversations on WhatsApp published by El Zócalo de Saltillo reveal that the man's daughter wrote, "¿Por qué se la diste, papá, ves lo que pasa? Cuando lo vi no me sorprendí, sabía que fuiste tú quien se la dio" ("Why did you give it to him, Dad, do you see what happens? When I saw him I was not surprised, I knew it was you who gave it to him."), to which the man replied, "No podía detenerlo, fue su voluntad" ("I couldn't stop him, it was his will.") Ramos Saucedo was arrested and charged with homicide by neglect in leaving his guns where a child could access them; he was later investigated for possible money laundering and tax evasion. It was later revealed that he had been working with Argentine drug lord Mario Roberto Segovia. In October 2021, his charge was later reduced to manslaughter, and he was released while the investigations were ongoing.

== Aftermath ==
Since the shooting, Colegio Cervantes has renewed classes with greatly increased security measures. The Coahuila state office of the Secretariat of Public Education (SEP) promised to renew the books used for teaching civics and ethics in the 2020–2021 school year. Rodolfo González Valderrama, director of Radio, Television, and Cinematography (RTC) in Tamaulipas says the state will regulate and perhaps remove some video games. Classification will be the same as for movies: AA (children), A (family), B (minors under 18), B15 (teens), C (adults), and D (extreme).

In 2020, a journalist named Javier Garza Ramos published a book called Nueve Disparos ("Nine Gunshots"), which is about the attack, the events leading up to it, and its aftermath.

=== School safety debate ===
Operativo Mochila ("Backpack Operation"), a program to prevent the introduction of weapons, drugs, and other dangerous contraband into schools, dates back at least to 2001; the shooting in Torreón reactivated the debate. Educational authorities and teachers generally support school screenings (especially by parent groups), while human rights advocates oppose it. Parents at the Colegio Cervantes expressed opposition to the program in October 2019.

Critics of the program, such as Laura Bárcenas Pozos of the Universidad Iberoamericana Puebla, emphasize that school authorities must reinforce the psychosocial area of schools, learn to listen, generate spaces for dialogue, and include parents more in the development of their children. In an interview with El Sol de Puebla, Bárcenas Pozos declared, "Creo que antes de analizar la Operación Mochila, deberían aterrizar en las escuelas la cultura de la paz." ("I think that before analyzing Operation Backpack, a culture of peace should be established in schools").

On 9 January 2020, one day before the shooting in Torreón, the Supreme Court of Mexico announced they would review the 2017 injunction against the Safe Backpack program in Mexico City. At the time, parents argued that children were frightened by the presence of police officers in their schools and that the program violated the right to privacy guaranteed by Article 14 of the Constitution of Mexico.

== See also ==
- List of attacks related to secondary schools
- List of school attacks in Mexico
- List of youngest killers
- Columbine Effect
