= Valparaíso school shootings =

1999 school shootings in Chile

1999 Valparaíso school shootings
- Location: Valparaíso, Chile
- Date: 17 December 1999; 11:15 – 11:32 AM
- Attack type: School shooting, workplace shooting, mass shooting, spree killing, triple murder, filicide
- Weapon: 7.65 mm Lorcin L-32 pistol
- Deaths: 3
- Injuries: 1 (the perpetrator)
- Perpetrator: Iván Arancibia Navarro
- Motive: Frustration over recent dismissal heightened by delusional psychosis
- Charges: Qualified homicide (2 counts); Parricide (1 count)
- Verdict: Not guilty by reason of insanity

The Valparaíso school shootings were a spree killing that occurred on 17 December 1999, occurring at the B-29 Valparaíso high school and the Eduardo de la Barra Valparaíso high school, both located in Valparaíso, capital of the Valparaíso Region in central Chile. The perpetrator, recently dismissed physics professor Iván Arancibia Navarro, 47 years old at the time, killed three people in total, including his own three-year-old daughter, before attempting suicide with a self-inflicted gunshot to the head.

After being rushed to a nearby hospital, he recovered and was eventually declared not guilty by reason of insanity, as he was suffering from a delusional psychosis. Overcome from depression caused by his daughter's death, Arancibia eventually committed suicide in his parents' home in 2011. The incident has been recognized as the first and deadliest school shooting in Chilean history.

== Events ==
At approximately 9 am on 17 December 1999, Iván Arancibia went to the engineering faculty of the Catholic University of Valparaíso to order nearly 200 photocopies of a pamphlet he authored where he claimed to have designed a way to generate free energy using water, which he then distributed among the students of the faculty. After this unusual event episode, which already gave clear signs of his deteriorated mental state, at 11:15 he showed up at the B-29 Valparaíso high school (now known as Bicentennial Valparaíso high school) in Valparaíso, his former workplace. That morning, the establishment was being used as one of the venues to take the Academic Aptitude Test, the national University admissions exams in Chile. Arancibia was accompanied by his three-year-old daughter Tamara Arancibia and carried a box wrapped in gift paper.

After being let into the establishment (despite not being supposed to work that day) Arancibia went with his daughter to the office of the school's director, Eliseo Nogué Gutiérrez. After a brief exchange of words, Arancibia extracted a 7.65 mm Lorcin pistol (which he had bought just two weeks before) (Note: The exact origin of the weapon isn't clear. According to a journalistic investigation from 2000 published by the University of Chile, he purchased it illegally from a member of the Chilean Armed Forces, who received strong sanctions from his institution for this. However, an episode of the true crime documentary series Enigma, produced by TVN, insists that he had acquired it legally from a gun shop in the area.) and a six-round magazine from the package and murdered Nogué with two shots to the chest and one to the head. He then proceeded to also kill his own daughter with a bullet to the chest and another to the head. Virtually no one heard the shots, since Arancibia used a garbage bag as a silencer. Although it is theorized that he killed his daughter after Nogué to avoid "future suffering" caused by his father's actions, it is also possible that he murdered her before Nogué to demonstrate that his threats were serious. The corpses of Eliseo Nogué and Tamara Arancibia wouldn't be discovered until 11:40, at which point Arancibia had long left the building.

At 11:20 Arancibia headed on foot seven blocks towards the Eduardo de la Barra Valparaíso high school, where the headquarters of the Municipal Corporation of Valparaíso (Coordinación Municipal de Valparaíso, CMV) were located. Carrying the same package, he entered the office of the CMV education director, Luis Inocencio Alvear, at 11:30. Repeating the previous method, Arancibia took out the pistol hidden in the gift box and, in front of the horrified officials who were there, killed Inocencio with four bullets at close range, three of them in the chest and one in the head. In the midst of panic and confusion, Arancibia finally broke into the office of the CMV manager, Víctor Quezada, who he pointed at with his pistol. However, upon realizing that he had already used 11 bullets and only had one more left in the magazine, Arancibia decided to commit suicide by shooting himself in his mouth at 11:32. Despite causing serious loss of brain matter, the shot did not kill him and Arancibia managed to recover after spending two months hospitalized at the Carlos van Buren Hospital in Valparaíso, despite losing vision in one eye.

At the time of the events, then-mayor of Valparaíso Hernán Pinto was in a nearby square, carrying out a Christmas activity with low-income minors. While giving his speech, Pinto jokingly commented, "What are those baddies doing now?" after hearing the sirens of police vehicles, mistakenly assuming that the origin of the tumult was due to some farewell trick played by senior students taking their college entrance exams.

=== Victims ===
- Eliseo Francisco Nogué Gutiérrez (58): Born in Santiago, Nogué had served as director of Liceo B-29 since 1994. He was married, had five children and more than three decades of experience as a teacher.
- Verónica Tamara Arancibia Aguad (3): The youngest child of Iván Arancibia, she was the only one he conceived with his then partner Heidi Aguad. Tamara lived with her parents and her two stepbrothers, born from her mother's previous marriage.
- Luis Agustín Inocencio Alvear (49): Director of the education area of the Municipal Corporation of Valparaíso since 1990, after having been retaliated by the Pinochet dictatorship. He was married and had three children.

All three victims had a shared funeral on 18 December. Arancibia and Nogué were buried at Valparaíso Cemetery N°3, whereas Inocencio was buried at the El Sendero Park Cemetery.

== Perpetrator ==
Iván Jesús Arancibia Navarro

Iván Jesús Arancibia Navarro (12 February 1952 – 27 December 2011) was a Chilean physics teacher and perpetrator of the 1999 Valparaíso school shootings.

Iván Arancibia was described as an intelligent, introverted, perfectionist, and extremely meticulous man, fond of order and cleanliness, concerned with ethics and traditional values, although he often gave out inappropriate comments, and with a marked superiority complex due to his exceptional intellectual and scientific abilities. Since his youth, he had a withdrawn personality, which was caused after his mother divorced his father, remarried, and had another child, leading Arancibia to feel rejected. His brother, Sergio, had committed suicide after a divorce. He possessed a special interest in science, for which he studied physics pedagogy at the Pedagogical Institute, now the Playa Ancha University, of his native Valparaíso. Once graduated, he married the basic teacher Gabriela Chandía, with whom he had three children.

In 1976, during the military dictatorship, Arancibia went into exile in Sweden, where he worked as a teacher and specialized in systems analysis at the University of Gothenburg, while Chandia stayed in Chile to finish her studies. After a brief stay in Ecuador, he returned to his country in 1989, where, already separated from his wife, he resumed his relationship with Heidi Aguad, a student of pedagogy in natural sciences at the University of Chile in Valparaíso that he met before getting married. Their only daughter, Tamara, would be born in 1996. In 1991, Arancibia joined the teaching staff of the Municipal Corporation of Valparaíso (CMV).

As a physics and mathematics teacher, he was characterized by his strict discipline and, above all, by his excessive academic rigor, which had left many of his students with practically unrecoverable grade averages. Due to multiple complaints from students and parents received between June and September 1999, in October of that year the Municipal Corporation of Valparaíso decided to remove Arancibia from his academic functions so that he would begin to perform administrative tasks, as coordinator of the science area. social. Arancibia, however, refused to comply with the decision and filed a complaint with the College of Teachers, as well as an appeal for protection before the Court of Appeals of Valparaíso.

On December 16, 1999, one day before the attack, Arancibia appeared at the editorial office of the newspaper La Estrella de Valparaíso ("The Star of Valparaíso") to publicly denounce his employment situation. Arancibia declared that he had been "humiliated" simply for demanding discipline from his students, and that the director of the educational establishment where he worked had removed him from teaching in contravention of a Labor Inspection ruling in his favor, decreed in November. When the reporter who interviewed him asked him the name of the institution where he worked, Arancibia responded: "You will know soon."

=== Legal process ===
On 20 December 1999, while still recovering in the hospital from his suicide attempt, Arancibia was formally arrested and later prosecuted for two counts of qualified homicide and one count of parricide. (Note: Although the word "parricide" typically refers to the killing of one's own parents, under Chilean law, the term "parricidio" can mean the killing of anyone of one's own ascendants or descendants.) Due to Chilean penal code at the time, he faced a minimum of 35 years' imprisonment (10 years for each homicide and 15 for the parricide) and a maximum sentence of death.

In May 2000, various psychiatric examinations carried out on Arancibia declared him mentally unfit for trial. The case was reopened in August 2000 as ordered by the Court of Appeals of Valparaíso, as Arancibia was found it to stand trial. On 7 September 2001, Arancibia was definitively acquitted by Judge Jaquelinne Nash when it was determined that he suffered from a case of delusional psychosis and was therefore not guilty by reason of insanity. Alejandro Nogué, son of victim Eliseo Nogué, criticized this ruling, citing that he "should be in prison" and that Arancibia was being treated like a "victim" due to his weakened health.

He was hospitalized for several years in the Dr. Philippe Pinel Psychiatric Hospital in Putaendo, where he was eventually discharged.

=== Death ===
After being discharged, he moved to his parents' house, in Viña del Mar. Distraught by the regret of killing his own daughter, something he still felt responsible for, he committed suicide by suffocating with a bag over his head on 27 December 2011. Heidi Aguad reported that she forgave him, that she "still loved him" and that "may God forgive him".

== See also ==
- Aracruz school shootings, another school shooting in Latin America involving multiple institutions
- Sanski Most school shooting, a school shooting with similar motive and duplicate casualty count
