= Rio de Janeiro school shooting =

2011 mass shooting in Rio de Janeiro, Brazil

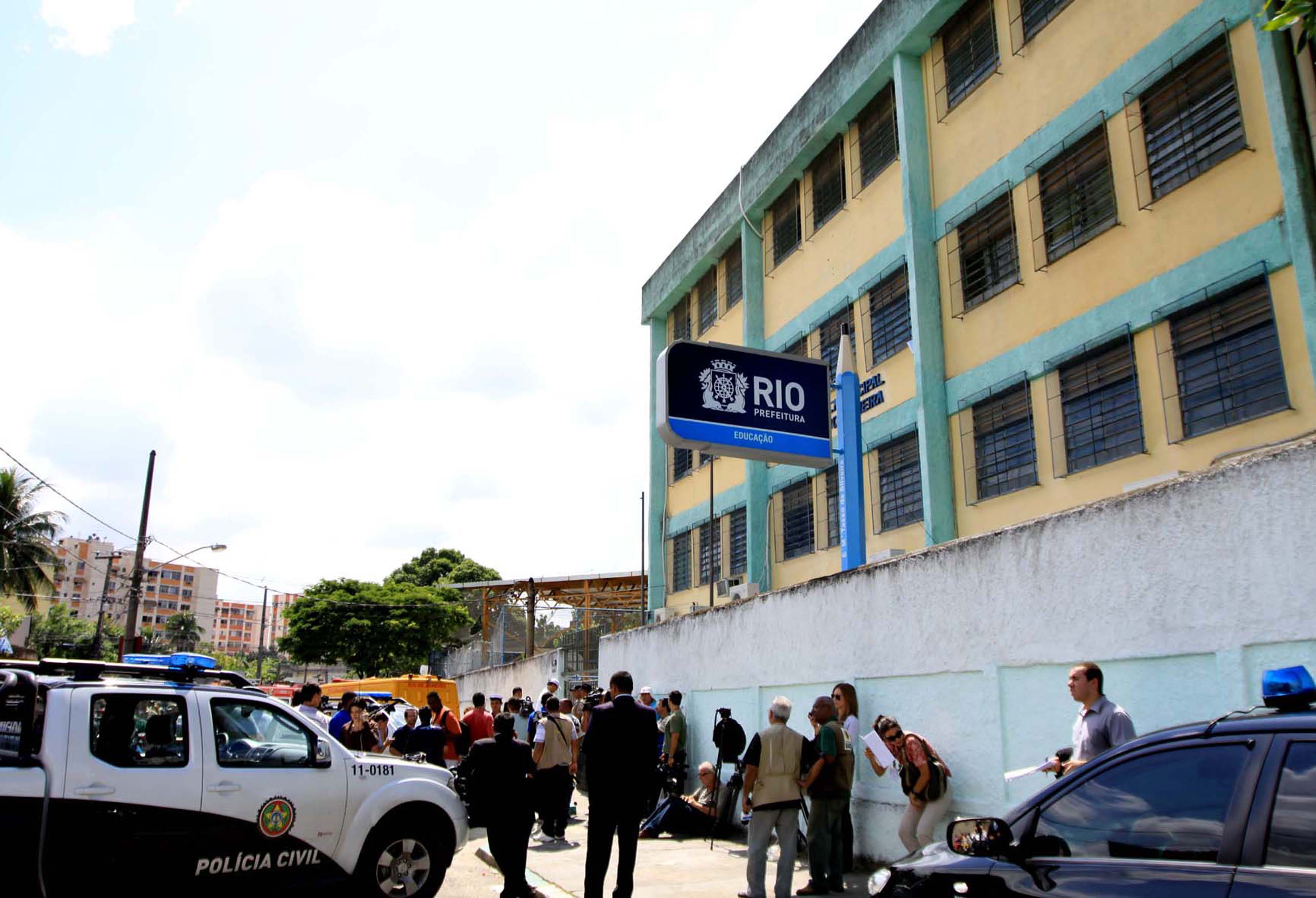
- Tasso da Silveira Municipal School after the shooting

- Location: 22.883834°S 43.417405°W; Tasso da Silveira Municipal School (Escola Municipal Tasso da Silveira), Realengo, Rio de Janeiro, Brazil
- Date: 7 April 2011; 08:30 – 08:42 (BRT, UTC−03:00)
- Attack type: School shooting; mass shooting; mass murder; Pedicide; murder–suicide; shootout
- Weapons: .38-caliber Rossi Model 971 revolver; .32-caliber Taurus Model 73 snub-nosed revolver; Pocket knife (unused)
- Deaths: 13 (including the perpetrator)
- Injuries: 22
- Perpetrator: Wellington Menezes de Oliveira
- Motive: Retaliation for bullying, possibly accompanied by religious fanaticism

On the morning of 7 April 2011, a school shooting occurred at the Tasso da Silveira Municipal School, an elementary school in Realengo, a western neighbourhood of Rio de Janeiro, Brazil. Twelve students were killed, and 22 others seriously wounded by 23-year-old Wellington Menezes de Oliveira, a former student who committed the attack with two revolvers. Oliveira was intercepted by the police but committed suicide before being arrested. It was the first reported mass shooting at a school to not be tied to gang violence in Brazil. It remains tied with the 2016 Campinas massacre as the second-deadliest mass shooting by a lone gunman in Brazilian history, both surpassed only by the 1997 Santo Antônio do Potengi massacre.

Although police found no concrete evidence of religious or political motives, texts found at Oliveira's home suggest that he was obsessed with terrorist acts and Islam, which he had converted to two years beforehand, after having been a Jehovah's Witness. He had requested to be buried following Islamic traditions and asked Jesus for eternal life and "God's forgiveness for what I have done." According to his adoptive sister and a close colleague, Oliveira was a reserved person, and had previously suffered from bullying.

== Background ==
Police investigations prior to the massacre, via an anonymous report, found that Oliveira had purchased a .32-caliber revolver with two men—Charleston Souza de Lucena and Izaías de Souza. Both suspects confessed to have being middlemen in the revolver's sale at a nearby kiosk in Sepetiba. According to one of the suspects, Oliveira claimed that he had bought the weapon to protect himself. According to Lucena and Souza, the person who sold them the firearm was called Robson. The men also claim that Robson had been missing since the sale and presumed dead.

Both Lucena and Souza stated they regretted the sale. Lucena said: "If I had known he was going to do that, I would never have sold the gun. I have children. He [Oliveira] lived across the street from the school where my six-year-old daughter and stepson studied."

A 57-year-old slaughterhouse worker and former co-worker of the perpetrator was eventually discovered to be the one to sell Oliveira the second weapon used in the attack. According to him, he sold Wellington the weapon, the speedloaders, and a large quantity of ammunition, possibly including that used in the shooting.

== Shooting ==
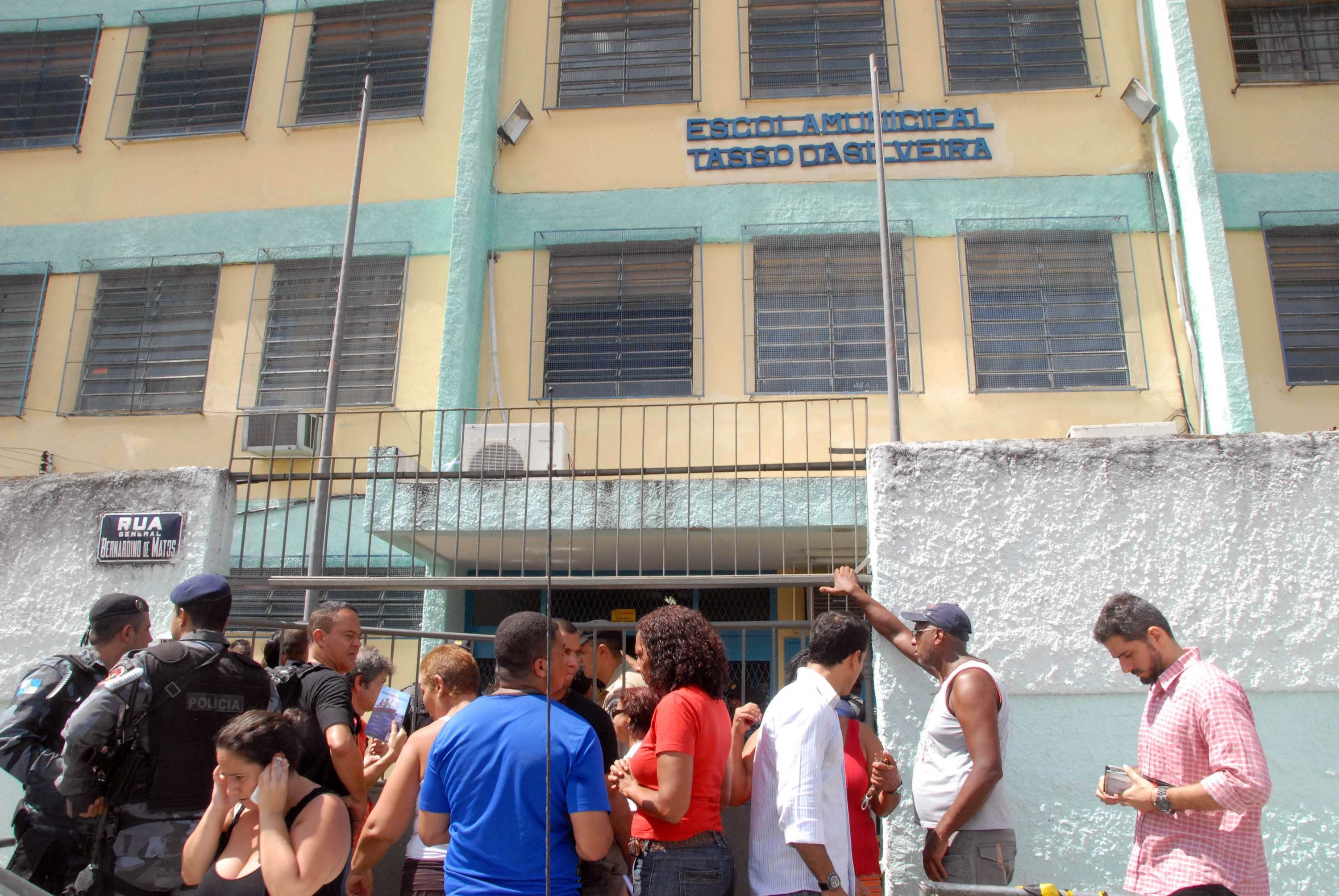
Municipal School Tasso da Silveira, in Realengo, on the day of the shooting.

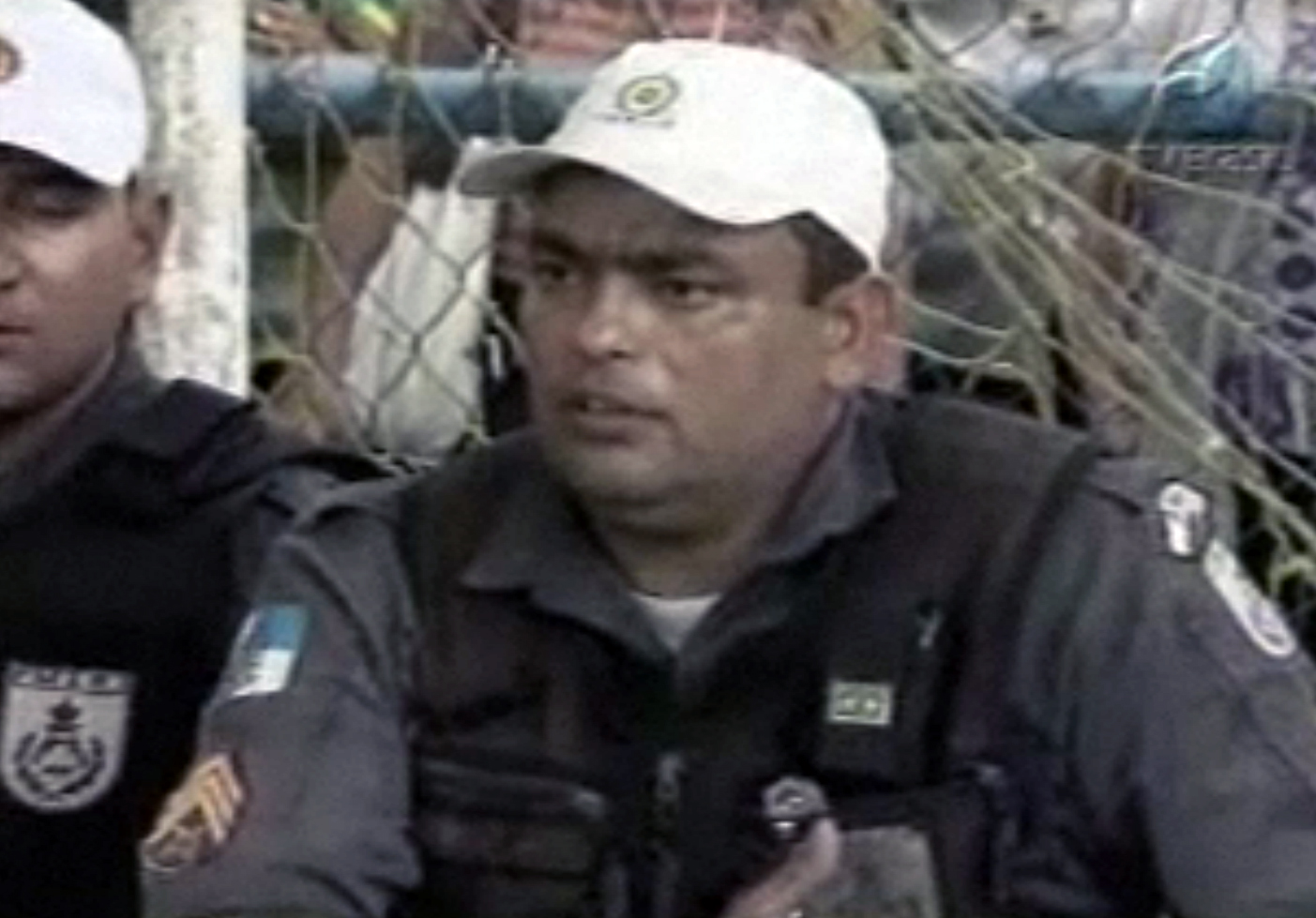
Sargeant Márcio Alves, the police officer who shot Wellington

At around 08:30 (BRT) on Thursday, 7 April 2011, Oliveira entered the Tasso da Silveira Municipal School. After entering, he claimed that he was a lecturer who was scheduled to host a talk to the students that morning. After being allowed entry, Oliveira proceeded to the first floor and entered an eighth-grade classroom, where a Portuguese class was taking place. Immediately after entering, he took out his weapons and fired at several students. He was armed with two revolvers, one in each hand, and a number of speedloaders that, according to the police, required expert training to use efficiently. Oliveira specifically targeted girls to kill, only shooting boys in the arms and legs in order to incapacitate them. According to witnesses, he referred to the girls as 'impure beings' during the shooting, and shot many of them in the head at point-blank range. Ten girls and two boys, aged between 13 and 15, were killed in the classroom, with Oliveira firing more than thirty shots.

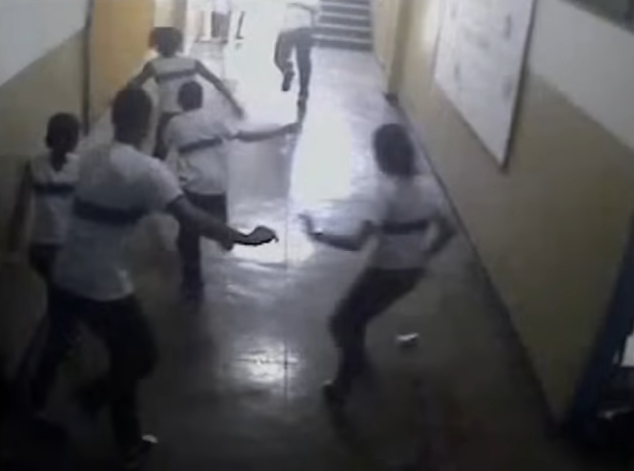
Students in the school trying to flee. Image taken from the CCTV in the school grounds.

Many children and staff members evacuated the school after hearing the initial gunfire. One student alerted two Ministry of Transport officers who were patrolling the nearby area to the shooting. A Rio de Janeiro military policeman, Third Sergeant Márcio Alexandre Alves, entered the school after being made aware of the situation, and encountered the gunman on a staircase. Alves shot him in the leg and in the stomach, causing the gunman to fall down the stairs. Oliveira then committed suicide with a gunshot to the head. According to Alves, Oliveira pointed one of his revolvers at him, but did not shoot, instead deciding to turn it on himself. He later stated, "The feeling is of sadness for the children. I have a kid that age. But also there's a feeling of accomplishment, I stopped him from going to the third floor and killing more victims."

11 of the 12 students were buried the day after the shooting following the Brazilian practice of burying (or cremating) people within a day of their death. The twelfth child's body was cremated two days after the shooting.

== Perpetrator ==
Wellington Menezes de Oliveira (13 July 1987 – 7 April 2011), a 23-year-old former pupil of the school, was identified as the perpetrator. He was adopted by Dicéa Menezes de Oliveira as a child; his biological mother suffered from a mental illness and had attempted suicide in the past. He was described as a quiet, shy and introverted boy, who stayed out of trouble and followed rules. Dicéa Oliveira was a Jehovah's Witness and died in 2010, a year before the shooting. Wellington also claimed to be a follower of the Jehovah's Witnesses religion earlier in life, but reportedly rarely adhered to its teachings.

=== Education ===
Oliveira attended the Tasso da Silveira Municipal School from 1999 to 2002. According to former schoolmates he was a strange, very reserved person constantly harassed by others, was called "Sherman" (an allusion to a character from American Pie), as well as "suingue" (swing), because he had a limp leg, and was once thrown into a garbage bin. In a video he had recorded two days prior to the shooting Oliveira stated: "The struggle for which many brothers died in the past, and for which I will die, is not solely because of what is known as "bullying" [the English word]. Our fight is against cruel people, cowards, who take advantage of the kindness, the weakness of people unable to defend themselves.

Oliveira, in a letter, refers to the bullying he suffered at school: "A lot of times I was beaten by a group, and everyone who was around mocked me, had fun with the humiliation I suffered with, without caring about my feelings". According to the statement of an ex-schoolmate: "Once upon a time in school they put Wellington with his head down, placed his head on the toilet and flushed it. Some people instigated the girls: 'Come on, mess with him'. Or they would be the one incentivizing: 'Let's play with him, let's screw with him'. The abuse happened in 2001. In that year, on September 11, the biggest terrorist attack of all time became an obsession to Wellington".

=== Later life ===
In an April 13 interview with his adoptive family, it was stated Oliveira had only a handful of friends that he saw in person, with most of the people he talked to being via the internet. Oliveira spent almost all of his time on his personal computer. His mother apparently treated him differently later in life, possibly due to his refusal to move out and start a family, in contrast to his siblings who were all married. His mother also anticipated that she would die before her son moved out, which she did.

Her death in 2010 apparently caused Oliveira's already poor mental health to worsen. In 2010 he stopped attending sessions with a psychologist, possibly due to the death of his mother. And her death worsened his mental illness, already known by his family and with an attempt of treatment with a psychologist, that was abandoned by the young man. He previously attended Jehovah's Witnesses meetings with his mother, but stopped after her death, with this being the time he stopped associating with the religion all together, beginning to search for other religions.

After the death of Dicéa, his brothers searched his computer and found that he made internet searched related to firearms. In addition, he also took shooting classes. It is speculated that, due to this, Oliveira began planning the attack around this time, picking his former school as the target as revenge for the bullying he faced.

Pictures taken by Oliveira show him standing in positions similar to that of Seung-Hui Cho, perpetrator of the Virginia Tech shooting, including him pointing the firearms used in the shooting at himself and the camera. It was later confirmed he felt "inspired" by Cho, going so far as to call him a "brother" and thanking him, along with fellow Brazilian Edmar Freitas, the perpetrator of the 2003 Taiúva school shooting, for their "bravery" and for "leading the way".

=== Conversion to Islam ===
Police confirmed that a suicide note was found on Oliveira, stating his intention to commit suicide. The police also assured the public that they found no evidence of religious or political reasons being the driving motivator for the attack. Information found during searches of Oliveira's residence suggest that he was obsessed with terrorist acts and Islam, which he described as the most correct religion. A neighbor stated that Oliveira had converted to Islam two years beforehand. In his letters, Oliveira describes his attendance of a mosque in downtown Rio and his studying of the Qur'an.

In his letters, he often talks about a man named "Abdul", who apparently immigrated to Brazil and boasted about having taken part in the September 11 attacks. Abdul would later be discovered to be a former pupil of Oliveira. Oliveira also expressed a desire to move to a Muslim-majority country, either Egypt or Malaysia. The Federation of Muslim Association of Brazil published a statement stating that they did not consider Oliveira a true Muslim.

His body was buried in a potter's field at the Caju Cemetery on April 22, after fifteen days in the coroner's office, without the presence of any family. In his last wishes, he wished to be buried following Islamic traditions, and asked Jesus for eternal life and "God's forgiveness for what I have done". None of the procedures that he had asked to be done in his suicide letter were done.

== Victims ==
The list of victims was released by police in Rio de Janeiro:

- Ana Carolina Pacheco da Silva, aged 13
- Bianca Rocha Tavares, aged 14
- Géssica Guedes Pereira, aged 15
- Igor Moraes da Silva, aged 13
- Karine Chagas de Oliveira, aged 14
- Larissa dos Santos Atanásio, aged 13
- Laryssa Silva Martins, aged 13
- Luiza Paula da Silveira, aged 15
- Mariana Rocha de Souza, aged 13
- Milena dos Santos Nascimento, aged 13
- Rafael Pereira da Silva, aged 14
- Samira Pires Ribeiro, aged 14

The families of four victims decided to donate the victims' organs. Twelve daycares in Rio would go on to be named after them. The first to receive this homage was Samira Pires Ribeiro, whose name was given to a day care (Espaço de Desenvolvimento Infantil) in Guaratiba. Six injured students, two of them in critical condition, required further treatment.

== Investigation ==
=== Police inquiry ===
The killer's computer was reviewed, and the instructor who had taught Oliveira to shoot was questioned. The police had no intention of recreating the crime in Realengo, and a forensic psychologist was tasked with issuing a report on the shooter's mental condition. Police questioned Abdul, with whom the Oliveira had messaged online. However, he was later determined to have had no complicity in the attack, with the deputy clarifying: "He [Oliveira] acted alone. He was a mentally ill person who had a psychotic break, resulting in the tragedy that affected the whole country."

Police estimate that over 60 shots were fired during the attack. His body was found with a .38-caliber and a .32-caliber revolver, along with some speedloaders and a bandolier containing 18 unused rounds.

=== Motivation ===
The motivation for the massacre is not fully known. It has been suggested that the killer exhibited psychopathic traits. However, it is not certain that he was a psychopath, as one of the defining traits of psychopathy is a lack of remorse and pleasure derived from others’ suffering. From a psychiatric perspective, a sociopath typically does not exhibit suicidal ideation; they may take pleasure in killing but do not harm themselves. With scientific rigor, it has been suggested that the Realengo killer suffered from a neuropsychiatric disorder with psychopathic traits, combining persecutory ideation, delusions, hallucinations, fantasies, and a distorted perception of reality.

==== Bullying and outside influence ====
On the day of the tragedy, national media reported that his adoptive sister claimed he had connections to Islam, rarely left the house, and "lived on the Internet". Another theory suggests that he had experienced bullying during his school years. This has led some to describe the attack as an "imported tragedy," as similar incidents had occurred in countries such as the United States, Argentina, Russia, and China, but were rare in Brazil.

Police found two videos at Oliveira's home in which he discussed his motivations. His speech was described as confused and possibly influenced by medication. In one, he stated: "Our fight is not solely about bullying. It is against cruel people who take advantage of the kindness and weakness of those unable to defend themselves." Oliveira had attempted to delete these videos on the day of the crime.

On April 13, police released another video recovered from his computer, recorded before July 2010. The video was recovered with a program used by the FBI. In the 58-second clip, he reads a letter expressing feelings of being disrespected and humiliated, reinforcing the theory that the attack was motivated by bullying: "Most people that disrespect me, think I'm an idiot, that take advantage of my kindness, that judge me in advance [...]. An action will done for your fellow men that are humiliated, assaulted, disrespected in various places, like schools and colleges".

On April 15, authorities released an additional video in which he described his preparations and again cited school humiliation as a key motive.

==== Religious fanaticism ====
His suicide letter and personal page on the social media platform Orkut contained religious themes and passages from the Bible. The newspaper Clarín, reported that he concluded his letter with a request typical of a devout believer, asking for a visit from a faithful person to his grave and referencing the second coming of Christ.

A close friend stated that Oliveira "suffered from bullying and was addicted to violent games and terrorist attacks." The friend also said his nickname was "Al-Qaeda" and that he frequently discussed terrorist attacks, with 9/11 being his "favorite." At Oliveira's home, police found letters suggesting possible connections with extremist Islamic groups. The letters indicated that he practiced Islam, read the Qu'ran for hours daily, and showed interest in visiting Muslim countries. However, police later dismissed these claims, suggesting they may have been delusional. A barber reported that Oliveira once said he could not shave his beard because he would be expelled from a group he belonged to in Rio de Janeiro, however, by the time of the attack, he had shaved his beard.

The letters also mentioned two extremists with whom he allegedly communicated online, one of whom claimed near involvement in 9/11. Authorities dismissed this line of investigation, and both acquaintances and Islamic organizations denied any real connection.

==== Misogyny ====
Some human rights organizations suggested that misogyny may have been a motivating factor, as the attack appeared to target girls more directly. Comparisons were also made to other attacks, such as that carried out by Elliot Rodger. It is also said that a misogynistic website, whose owners were arrested in March 2012, idolised Oliveira's actions.

=== Interpretation of the suicide note ===
The letter prompted extensive analysis by theologians, psychologists, and legal experts after its release. While it contains elements from multiple religious traditions, experts noted that it does not clearly align with any single belief system, with one stating "direct references to a specific belief and that it can't be read as an authentic religious speech". Some experts pointed to similarities with Islamic burial practices, such as Oliveira's wish for his body to be washed and wrapped in a white sheet. His letter has been compared to those left by Islamic radicals, such as by Mohamed Atta, ringleader of the hijackers in the September 11 attacks. The National Union of Islamic Entities of Brazil also confirmed that Oliveira's request did align with common Islamic practice following death.

Other experts emphasized references to Christian beliefs, particularly the second coming of Jesus. Theologian Leonardo Boff described the text as syncretic, combining elements from various religious traditions and reflecting a distorted understanding shaped by psychological issues.

Another specialist, Eulálio Avelino Pereira Figueira, coordinator of the specialization course in Religious Science in the Pontifical Catholic University of São Paulo, stated: "There's no religion that is founded on gratuitous evil, much less on the perversion and the cruelty. [...] The message of the text is a result of an imaginary religious collective". A forensic psychologist suggested that a personality disorder alone would not explain the crime, pointing instead to a psychological crisis as a contributing factor.

== National response ==
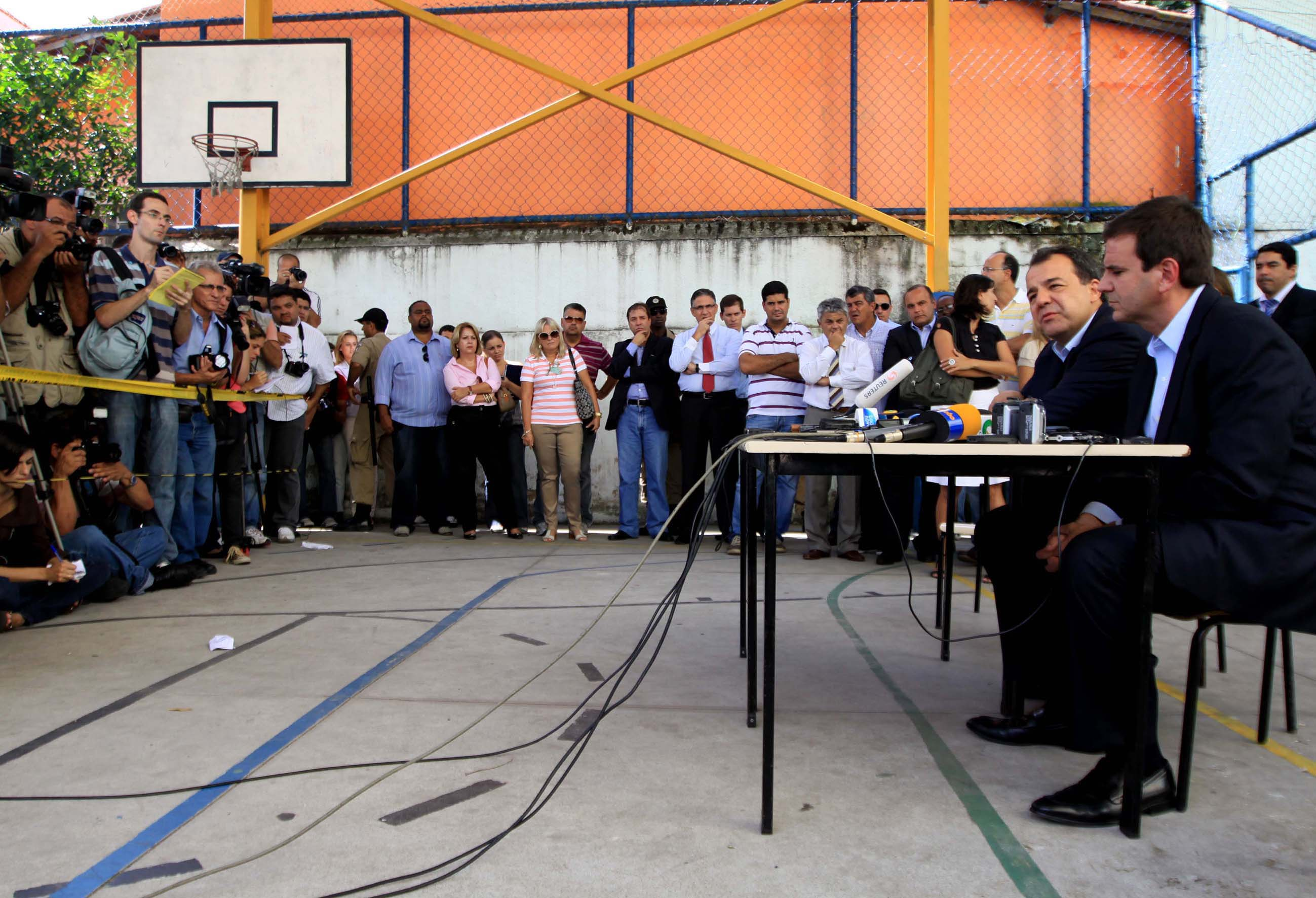
Governor Sérgio Cabral Filho and Mayor Eduardo Paes speaking about the shooting at school Tasso da Silveira, in Realengo on April 7, 2011.

President Dilma Rousseff said, through her spokesperson, that she was “shocked” and “appalled.” She also spoke by phone with Sérgio Cabral Filho and Eduardo Paes. The Minister of Education, Fernando Haddad, described the shooting as "a tragedy without precedent in Brazil."

Upon learning of the attack, Rousseff became emotional and asked for a minute of silence in memory of the victims. She declared three days of national mourning. She stated: "I will not give a speech today because we must mourn what happened in Realengo with helpless children. This is not characteristic of our country. We are united in condemning this act of violence."

Hours after the crime, Cabral Filho and Paes addressed the press at the school gymnasium, expressing their grief. Cabral described the shooter as a “psychopath and an animal” and praised the actions of the police, teachers, and students who helped alert authorities, calling them "heroes", "Without them, the tragedy would have been much worse" he said.

The case was listed by G1 (São Paulo) in 2014 among "9 cases of killers that shocked the country with their crimes", and by Brasil Online (BOL) in 2015 as "22 crimes that shocked Brazil".

In the aftermath, several online communities on the social network Orkut were created to glorify the attack and its perpetrator, promoting hate speech and encouraging similar acts. These groups often used fake profiles and engaged in other extremist communities. Authorities raised concerns, noting that such activities could fall under laws against racism and related crimes. Google, which owned Orkut, removed these communities in accordance with its policies.

The attack sparked nationwide debate about school safety, prompting the government to accelerate a disarmament program beginning on May 6, 2011. On April 9, graffiti reading “assassino covarde” (“cowardly murderer”) appeared on Oliveira's house. Two days later, Realengo residents and former students of the school repainted it, stating that people “should not continue the harm he caused.” Hundreds of residents and students gathered outside the school to mourn the victims, leaving flowers and messages. On April 10, protesters displayed blood-stained Brazilian flags on Copacabana Beach in tribute to the victims.

At the end of a concert in São Paulo, singer Bono, from Irish band U2, asked nearly 80 thousand people to remember the children who died, as their names were displayed on a screen.

The three police officers who responded to the shooting were later honored for bravery by Vice President Michel Temer on April 12, 2011. Third Sergeant Márcio Alexandre Alves was promoted to second sergeant; Corporals Denilson Francisco de Paula and Ednei Feliciano da Silva were promoted to third sergeant.

== International response ==
UNESCO issued a statement condemning the attack and expressing sympathy for the victims’ families, emphasizing that schools should be places of peace and learning, stating: "UNESCO repudiates the attacks on the Rio school and sympathizes with the families. The school should be a place to rebuild the peace and culture."

International media widely covered the shooting, noting that such an attack was unprecedented in Brazil and deeply shocked public opinion. The Realengo attack had repercussion in many major outlets, including the British The Guardian, The Daily Telegraph and BBC; the North-American CNN, MSNBC, and The New York Times; Al Jazeera; the Spanish El País; and the Portuguese RTP. The Guardian mistakenly stated that twenty people were killed.

The archbishop of Rio de Janeiro, Orani João Tempesta, received a letter from Pope Benedict XVI, who said that he prayed for the quick recovery of the wounded and asked all people of the city to "help build a society with no violence, and respect for each other, especially for the weak and oppressed".

Students from Columbine, Colorado, United States, the site of a 1999 massacre, made a poster stating their feelings about the tragedy. The poster was sent to the Brazilian elementary school.

After the Sandy Hook Elementary School shooting by a former primary pupil, in Newtown, Connecticut, United States, on 14 December 2012, the Tasso da Silveira school held a vigil for the victims on 21 December.

== See also ==
- List of massacres in Brazil
- List of rampage killers (school massacres)
- Islamic extremism
- Parkland high school shooting - a paper compared Rio de Janeiro school shooting and it
