= List of school attacks in Argentina =

The following is a list of school attacks in Argentina, including stabbings and shootings that took place in daycare centers, schools, universities and other educational centers. Excluded from this list are the following:

1. Incidents that occurred as a result of police actions
2. Suicides or suicide attempts involving only one person.

== List ==
Date	Location	Perpetrator	Dead	Injured	Description
6 May 1997	Escuela de Educación Secundaria Técnica "Manuel Belgrano" in Buenos Aires	Unnamed	0	1	A 19-year-old student shot and injured a 21-year-old classmate in the arm with a .32-caliber handgun during an argument relating to football teams.
9 May 1997	Escuela Media N° 2 in Burzaco, Buenos Aires Province	Leonardo Aguirre	1	0	A 14-year-old student stole his father's Argentine National Gendarmerie service weapon, which he had been carrying around for alleged self-defense, and shot his classmate, Cristian Fernández, to death, by accident. He was charged with manslaughter.
2 July 1997	San Nicolás de los Arroyos, Buenos Aires Province	Unnamed	0	1	A 19-year-old was shot in the shoulder by a classmate.
3 July 1997	Centro Experimental del Adolescente N° 8 in Río Grande, Tierra del Fuego Province	Unnamed	0	1	A 16-year-old female (who was not a student of the institution) repeatedly stabbed a 16-year-old female student with a switchblade in the school bathroom after a fistfight.
15 July 1997	Concordia, Entre Ríos Province	Unnamed	0	1	A 16-year-old student was shot in the back during recess by a classmate.
16 October 1997	Escuela Nº 72 in Merlo Partido, Buenos Aires Province	Darío	0	1	During a fight relating to a romantic conflict, a student shot a 13-year-old classmate with a .22 short revolver.
22 May 1999	Escuela N° 27 in Boulogne Sur Mer, Buenos Aires Province	Unnamed	0	1	A 13-year-old student shot an 11-year-old female classmate with a .32-caliber revolver.
3 June 1999	Escuela N° 7 in Adrogué, Buenos Aires Province	Unnamed	0	1	A 13-year-old student stabbed a classmate of the same age during a fight.
12 August 1999	Escuela N° 48 in Almirante Brown Partido, Buenos Aires Province	Unnamed	0	1	A 6-year-old student stabbed a 14-year-old student with a knife after alleged insults towards the perpetrator's sister.
11 May 2000	Escuela Mariano Necochea in Las Heras, Mendoza Province	Gonzalo D.	0	1	A 15-year-old student shot a classmate with a .32-caliber revolver before throwing the weapon out the window and being subsequently arrested.
4 August 2000	Escuela de Enseñanza Media N° 9 in Rafael Calzada, Buenos Aires Province	Javier Ignacio Romero	1	1	Rafael Calzada school shooting: A 19-year-old former student shot one classmate dead and injured another before fleeing back home, where he was then arrested.
11 December 2000	Complejo Educativo San Antonio de Padua in Olavarría, Buenos Aires Province	Unnamed	1	0	A 15-year-old stabbed his physics teacher to death after she flunked him in a test.
23 May 2001	Escuela N° 39 "Justo Jose de Urquiza" in Melchor Romero, Buenos Aires Province	Unnamed	1	0	A 15-year-old stabbed a 19-year-old after they had a discussion on school safety and possible security flaws.
24 April 2003	Escuela Sendas Verdes in Buenos Aires	Alberto Gristaldi	1	0	A 51-year-old man entered a private school and shot his 48-year-old wife, who worked there as an administrator, twelve times with a .38 handgun, killing her on the spot.
28 September 2004	Instituto N° 202 "Islas Malvinas" in Carmen de Patagones, Buenos Aires Province	Rafael Solich	3	5	Carmen de Patagones school shooting: A 15-year-old student shot three classmates to death along with injuring another five before being tackled and taken into custody. He could not be prosecuted due to his young age.
18 September 2007	Escuela Normal "Julio Argentina Roca" in Monteros, Tucumán Province	José Miguel García	1	0	A 19-year-old student stabbed his ex-girlfriend to death.
27 March 2008	Escuela Media Nº 1 in Villa Gesell, Buenos Aires Province	Unnamed	1	0	A 17-year-old student stabbed his male classmate, 18-year-old Jonatan Otero, to death with a box cutter.
16 April 2008	Escuela N° 96 “José Manuel Estrada” in Paraná, Entre Ríos Province	Unnamed	0	1	An 18-year-old female student was stabbed inside of a school bathroom.
6 April 2011	Escuela "Faustina sarmiento belin" in San Juan, Argentina	Unnamed	0	0	A 14-year-old, apparently angry at having been rejected by a school, fired shots at the principal from the schoolyard. Fortunately, he missed, and no one was injured.
18 May 2011	Escuela ESB 7 in Punta Lara	Unnamed	0	0	A 15-year-old girl brought a weapon to school, allegedly to scare a classmate.
2 June 2011	Escuela N°42 "Juan Bautista Lasalle" in Ramos Mejía	Unnamed	0	1	A 15-year-old female student cuts a classmate’s throat with a pocketknife in front of the school during a fight.
23 August 2011	Colegio Pedro Ferré in Corrientes, Corrientes Province	Unnamed	0	1	A student was stabbed in the stomach by a classmate during recess.
16 April 2012	Escuela N°13 "benjamín Matienzo" in Burzaco	Unnamed	1	1	Two students, aged 32 and 55, who attend an adult education school, were shot by three criminals as they left the school; one of them died as a result.
3 October 2013	Escuela Secundaria Normal N°4 in San Pedro, Buenos Aires Province	Unnamed	0	1	Two students, aged 14 and 15, got into an argument in the classroom, and one of them injured the other with a pair of scissors, inflicting a cut on the face near the eyes.
10 October 2013	Escuela N° 29 "Arnaldo Ferrarotti" in Pilar, Buenos Aires Province	Unnamed	0	1	A 12-year-old student stabbed a 13-year-old classmate with a knife after a fistfight.
1 December 2014	Escuela Comercial N°13 in Villa Ballester	Marilyn	0	1	A 12-year-old student poisons her teacher’s water bottle with rat poison.
12 May 2015	Jardin de infantes "Ceferino Namuncurá" in Mar del Plata	Unnamed	0	0	A 5-year-old girl carries a loaded .32-caliber revolver in her backpack, which she later attempts to hide in her pocket.
20 May 2015	Escuela Media Nº 4 in Formosa, Formosa Province	Unnamed	0	2	A 40-year-old man stabbed a 15-year-old student after he got into a discussion with his son, also 15. A teacher was also stabbed after he tried to intervene.
15 April 2015	Jardín de Infantes "Estrellas Traviesas" in San Francisco, Córdoba Province	Mauro Bongiovanni	1	0	A 45-year-old man, after escaping from a psychiatric hospital, entered the daycare center where his ex-wife, 44, worked and slit her throat with a kitchen knife in front of all the children aged 3 and 4 in her care. In August 2016, the attacker was sentenced to life imprisonment.
4 August 2015	Escuela Secundaria N°62 in Merlo	Unnamed	0	1 (Note: Including the perpetrator.)	A 14-year-old student pulls out a 9mm Bersa handgun during recess and begins playing with it, until he accidentally shoots himself in the leg.
15 April 2016	BOP 105 in Misiones Province	Unnamed	0	2	A 14-year-old girl stabs a classmate with a tramontina knife after a physical education class.
23 June 2016	Escuela N°63 in Cutral Có	Unnamed	0	1	A 12-year-old student brings a revolver to school and threatens five classmates—also striking one with the butt of the weapon—allegedly in defense of his younger brother, who was being bullied.
22 May 2017	Escuela 11 "Carlos Octavio Bunge" in Tigre Partido	gaston Omar vega	0	0	A 19-year-old student fires shots inside the school after an argument with a classmate.
9 June 2017	Escuela Media Nº 11 in Florencio Varela, Buenos Aires Province	Unnamed	0	1	A 16-year-old student stabbed a 14-year-old student twelve times with a knife after being repeatedly bullied for his obesity.
27 April 2018	Escuela Normal "Señorita Irma Rita Barbosa Fonteina" in Curuzú Cuatiá, Corrientes Province	Unnamed	0	3	A student stabbed two other classmates with a knife before being beaten with a chair and disarmed.
7 May 2018	Colegio católico "San Carlos Borromeo" in La Matanza	Unnamed	0	1	A 13-year-old female student stabs a 14-year-old male classmate after he throws a piece of chalk at her (the knife used in the attack was apparently from the school cafeteria).
31 August 2018	Colegio Parroquial San Francisco de Asís in Córdoba, Córdoba Province	Unnamed	0	1	A secondary student stabbed a 14-year-old classmate in the ear with scissors during a fight.
20 February 2019	Escuela Normal "Dr. José Benjamín Gorostiaga" in La Banda, Santiago del Estero Province	Unnamed	0	1	A 14-year-old student lit a firework and threatened a teacher before stabbing the school's vice principal in with a Tramontina kitchen knife. In his possession were three more fireworks and a small gas canister.
26 June 2019	Escuela 1271 "Alicia Moreau de Justo" in Villa Gobernador Gálvez	Unnamed	0	0	A 12-year-old girl enters school with a loaded handgun and threatens a classmate; on the day of the incident, the weapon went unnoticed by school authorities.
15 November 2019	Instituto "Juan Manuel Estrada" in Quilmes	unnamed	0	1	A 14-year-old boy was stabbed by a 15-year-old former student. According to police sources, the attacker had been bullied by the victim. The assailant had left the school after being subjected to bullying and had been undergoing psychiatric treatment for the past six months.
20 november 2019	Escuela N°54 "Islas Malvinas" in Lanús	Unnamed	0	1	Two young women, aged 18 and 17 (who were not students at the institution), entered the school, stabbed a student, stole her mobile phone, and subsequently posted a video on social media mocking her.
4 July 2022	Escuela Secundaria N°4 "Justo José Urquiza" in Chajarí, Entre Ríos	Unnamed	0	3	A student attempted to set a classmate on fire, which sparked a blaze, and three people required hospital treatment for burns.
15 April 2023	Escuela primaria N°55 in La plata	Unnamed	0	1	An 11-year-old student arrived at school armed; he struck a teacher with the butt of the weapon and threatened his classmates, both in the classroom and on the playground.
29 August 2023	Escuela Secundaria del Lago N°11 in Belén de Escobar, Buenos Aires Province	Unnamed	0	2	A 14-year-old student carried out a violent machete attack, injuring a female classmate and a teacher. He has been placed in the custody of the juvenile justice system, facing an investigation for attempted homicide.
14 March 2024	Escuela N°1414 "San Arnoldo Jassen" in Santa Fe Province	Unnamed	0	1	A man who went to drop off his daughter at the school entrance was stabbed by a woman who then stole his mobile phone.
21 May 2024	Escuela N°178 in Neuquén Province	Unnamed	0	1	Two female students stab the mother of one of their classmates
1 April 2025	Escuela secundaria N°5 Bartolomé Mitre in Martínez, Buenos Aires	Unnamed	0	1	A 14-year-old boy stabbed a 15-year-old outside school because he was the “new kid.”
1 April 2025	Escuela de Educación Primaria N° 5 "Jorge A. Susini" in Ensenada, Buenos Aires Province	Unnamed	0	2	A 17-year-old stabbed two classmates, 12- and 16-year-old siblings, in the face.
7 April 2025	Instituto Privado "Santa Domenica" in Gregorio de Laferrère, Buenos Aires Province	K.C.	0	1	A 14-year-old girl stabbed a classmate in the head with a pocketknife at a private school.
10 September 2025	Escuela 4-042 "Marcelino H. Blanco" in La Paz, Mendoza Province	Unnamed	0	0	A 14-year-old girl fired shots with a 9mm pistol and threatened to kill multiple people at her school before surrendering to police after a five-hour standoff, reportedly staging the shooting as retaliation for bullying.
25 November 2025	Escuela Media de Alderetes, Alderetes, Tucumán Province	Unnamed	0	1	A 13-year-old student stabbed a 13-year-old classmate multiple times with a Tramontina-brand kitchen knife.
12 March 2026	Escuela primaria N°40 'Hermanos Latinoaméricano" in Pilar, Buenos Aires	unnamed	0	0	A man took refuge from a fight by entering a school playground; another man then pulled out an air rifle and began firing shots toward the school, which had students inside.
20 March 2026	Colegio "Luis Federico Leloir" in Mar del Plata	Unnamed	0	1	A 13-year-old student knocks his classmate to the ground and begins stabbing him in the head and eyes.
26 March 2026	Escuela primaria N°40 in Pico Truncado Santa Cruz province	Unnamed	0	0	An 11-year-old boy, a seventh-grade student, entered his school with an air-powered weapon. Witnesses indicated that the boy allegedly used the device to intimidate other students on the premises.
30 March 2026	Escuela Nº 40 “Mariano Moreno” in San Cristóbal, Santa Fe Province	Unnamed	1	8	San Cristóbal school shooting: A 15-year-old student opened fire with a shotgun at his school, killing a 13-year-old student and injuring several more before a doorman tackled and disarmed him.
4 April 2026	Escuela secundaria medía Edmundo Simonetti in Florentino Ameghino, Buenos Aires	Unnamed	0	1	A female student threw a thermos of hot water at a classmate at school, causing him severe burns.
16 April 2026	Escuela Secundaria Ricardo Rojas Media N°4 in San Martín, Buenos Aires Province	Nayla	0	1	A 14-year-old female student stabbed a 15-year-old male classmate in the back with a utility knife at the school entrance; the attack was motivated by jealousy and romantic issues.
22 April 2026	Escuela secundaria para jóvenes y adultos (ESJA) N°26 in Gualeguaychú, Entre Ríos	Unnamed	0	9	A 20-year-old student attacks his classmates with a motorcycle chain in the middle of a class; following the attack, the assailant flees on his motorcycle, but later returns to the educational institution, where he is arrested by the police.
20 May 2026	Universidad Nacional de la Patagonia Austral in Río Gallegos, Santa Cruz Province	P.B.	0	1	A 46-year-old university staff member repeatedly stabbed a 32-year-old student.
21 May 2026	Instituto D-196 "San Francisco" in Concordia, Entre Ríos	Unnamed	0	1	A 13-year-old girl brought a knife to school, causing a tense situation among her classmates. One of them managed to disarm her but was injured after being attacked with a pen in the chest and abdomen.
26 May 2026	Escuela N°88 "Bartolomé Mitre" in Paraná, Entre Ríos	Tamara Barreto	0	1	A mother who went to pick up her child from school was attacked by a group of people and stabbed by another woman—all this while students were leaving the school premises.
30 June 2026	CPEM N°6 in Cutral Có, Neuquén Province	Unnamed	0	1	A 13-year-old student entered the classroom carrying a firearm that accidentally discharged and wounded a classmate.
29 July 2026	Escuela N°768 in Puerto Madryn, Chubut	Unnamed	0	2	A student was stabbed with a homemade knife during a fight. After committing the attack, the assailant broke one of the establishment's windows, causing a significant injury to his arm.
26 August 2026	Escuela Secundaria Congreso de Tucumán in San Miguel de Tucumán, Tucumán Province	Unnamed	0	0	A 14-year-old student brought a revolver and fired a shot inside the classroom. The bullet struck a wall, and there were no injuries.
2 September 2026	Escuela Secundaria N°11 "Eduardo Depietri" in San Pedro, Buenos Aires Province	Roberto G.	0	0	Following an argument, a 16-year-old student with suspected mental health issues pulled a hammer from his backpack and attempted to attack a female classmate. Other students and cleaning staff intervened and stopped him.(This was one of the attacks that led to the decision to suspend classes on October 1st, amid calls for security in San Pedro schools.)
15 September 2026	Instituto Jesús María Plaza in González Catán	Unnamed	0	0	A 15-year-old student brought a gun to school, kept inside his backpack; it discharged accidentally when he threw the backpack onto the ground.
16 September 2026	Escuela primaria N°12 in Zapala, Neuquén	Y.B.C	0	1	A 21-year-old woman stabs a 15-year-old student in the back with a pair of scissors during a school break.
14 October 2026	Escuela N°58 De villa Dorrego in González Catán	Unnamed	0	1	A 17-year-old student shot an 18-year-old classmate in a school bathroom. The victim was struck by one bullet in the abdomen and another in the arm.
3 November 2026	Escuela secundaria N°61 "Malvinas argentinas" in Mar del Plata	Unnamed	0	1	A 12-year-old student was struck by a pellet from an air gun while leaving school.
5 November 2026	IPEM De barrio rosedal in Córdoba, Argentina	Unnamed	0	1	A 17-year-old student lured his 18-year-old ex-girlfriend to the vicinity of the school. Upon her arrival, the teenager ambushed her and attacked her with a pocketknife, inflicting cuts on her hands and body before fleeing the scene.
10 November 2026	Jardin de infantes "Universo infantil" in Rafael Castillo, Buenos Aires	Unnamed	0	0	A group of criminals opened fire on a kindergarten while the children were out at recess.
