= Murder of Tehuel de la Torre =

2021 missing person case

Tehuel de la Torre
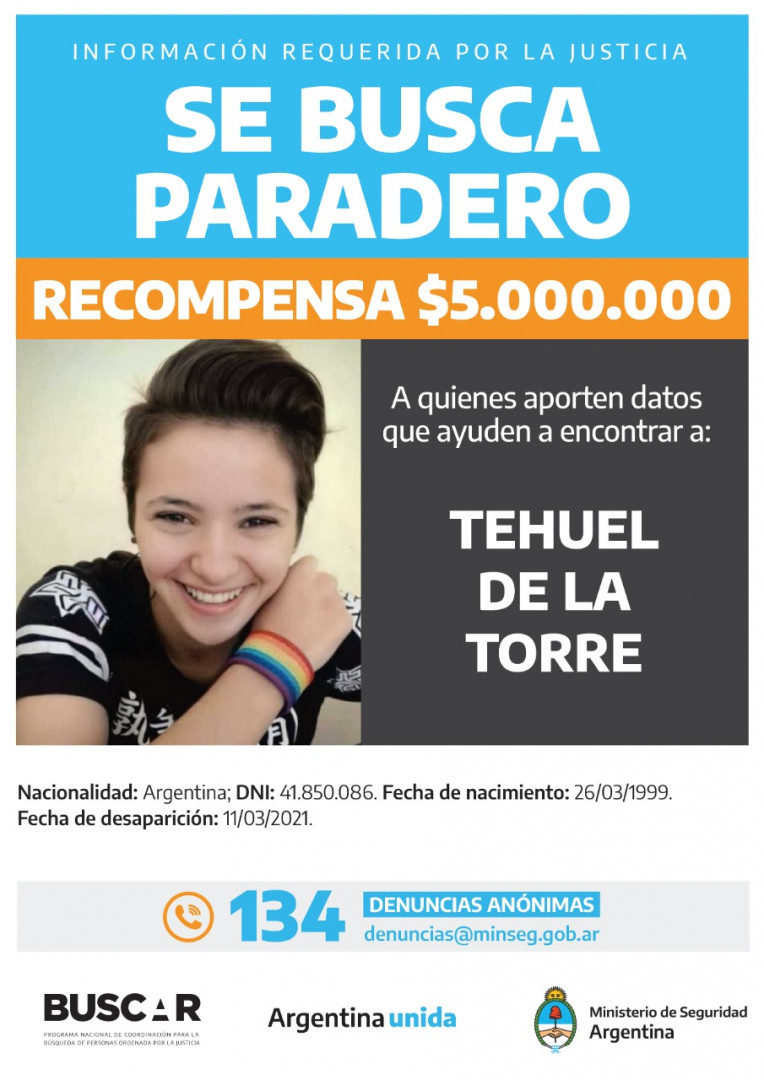
- Tehuel's identification photo used by the Ministry of National Security
- Born: 26 March 1999
- Disappeared: 11 March 2021 (aged 21); 19:00; Alejandro Korn, Buenos Aires, Argentina
- Status: Missing for 5 years, 6 months and 17 days
- Height: 1.56 m (5 ft 1 in)
Disappearance of Tehuel de la Torre
- Outcome: Luis Ramos, sentenced to life imprisonment for aggravated homicide motivated by hatred of gender identity; Oscar Montes, charged with aggravated homicide motivated by hatred of gender identity; Search for whereabouts ongoing
- Missing: Tehuel de la Torre (aged 21 at the time of disappearance)
- Arrests: Luis Alberto Ramos and Oscar Montes

Tehuel de la Torre (Spanish: [teˈwel de la ˈtore]; born 26 March 1999) was an Argentine trans man who disappeared in the afternoon of 11 March 2021 when he left his home in San Vicente, Buenos Aires, heading for Alejandro Korn to meet Luis Alberto Ramos (37), who had offered him a job as a waiter at a birthday party. His whereabouts remain unknown. The investigation led to the arrest of two men, who are being prosecuted for homicide. Ramos was convicted of his murder in 2024 and sentenced to life in prison.

== Disappearance ==
De la Torre was born on 26 March 1999. At the time of his disappearance, he lived in San Vicente, Buenos Aires, with his mother, his partner and her son, and his brother. De la Torre had started his gender transitioning a few months before his disappearance.

On 11 March 2021, De la Torre left his home heading for Alejandro Korn to meet Luis Alberto Ramos, a 37-year-old man whom he had met at several Workers' Socialist Movement rallies. Ramos had offered him a job as a waiter at a birthday party. He took a bus and arrived in Alejandro Korn to meet with Ramos. The interview was scheduled for 19:00 but he arrived at approximately 16:30.

At 00:24 on 12 March, the last signal from Tehuel de la Torre's mobile phone was recorded from Luis Ramos's address.

On 13 March, his family reported his disappearance to the police. A destroyed phone and jacket belonging to De la Torre were found in a raid to Ramos' house on 16 March.

== Report ==
On Saturday March 13, his girlfriend Michelle first went to the police station of San Vicente (Comisaría 1.ª de San Vicente) to file a missing person's report. She was initially rejected, but after returning with an older neighbor, she was able to obtain a report. She stated that they originally did not want to take her report because she was 17.

They wouldn't take my report because I was 17. When I was describing him to the police, one of the officers said to me, “Oh, he's a trans guy.” I felt a bit of discrimination and hostility. Later, I went back with a neighbor. They told us we had to file the report in Alejandro Korn because that's where he disappeared. They took us in a car Michelle, Tehuel's girlfriend. (Note: Original quote, in Spanish: No me quisieron tomar la denuncia por tener 17 años. Cuando lo describía a la policía, una de las oficiales me dijo: «ah es un pibe trans». Sentí un poco de discriminación y mala gana. Más tarde volví con una vecina. Nos dijeron que teníamos que hacer la denuncia en Alejandro Korn porque ahí es donde él desapareció. Nos llevaron en un móvil.)

=== Investigation ===
The investigation was assigned to Karina Guyot, prosecutor of the Decentralized Fiscal Unit of San Vicente.

==== 2021 ====
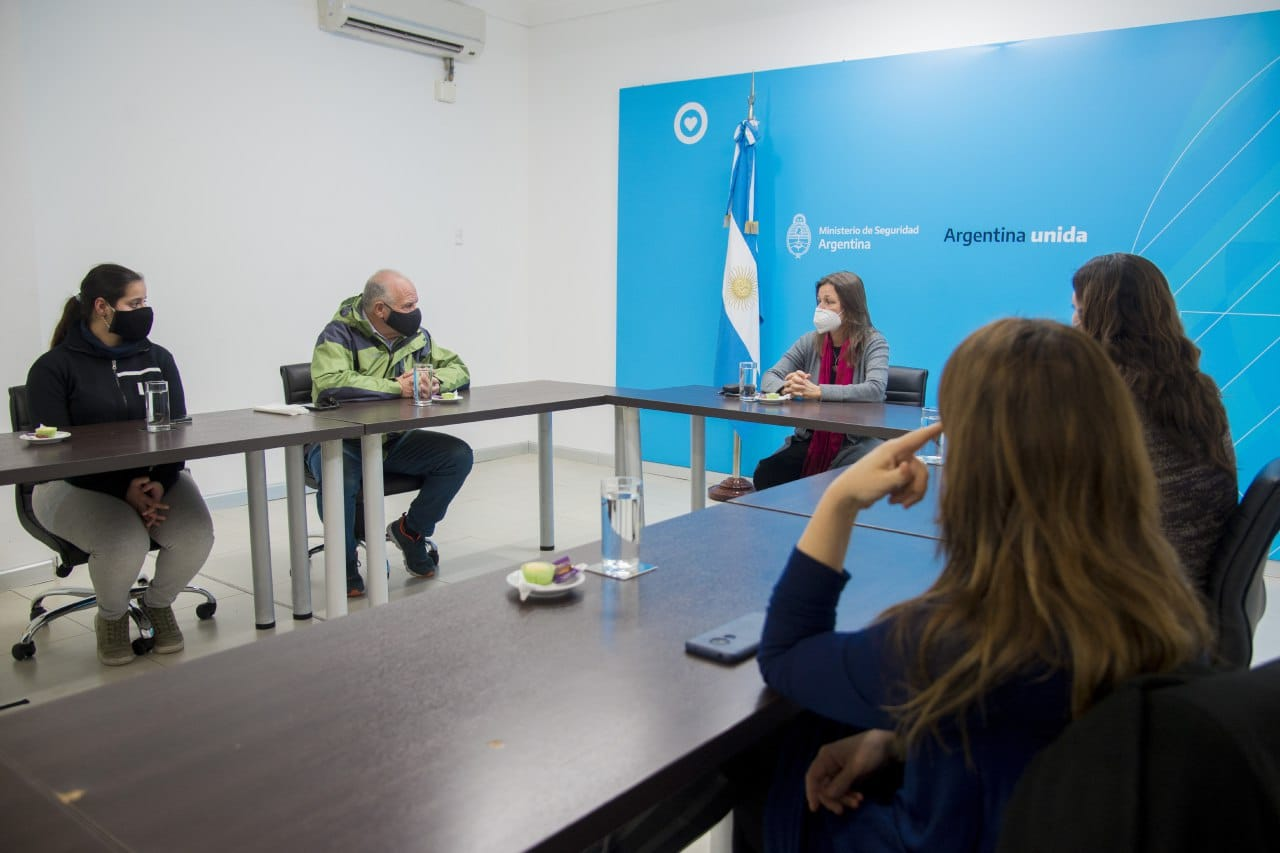
Sabina Frederic, Minister of National Security, meeting with Andrés and Ailén, Tehuel's father and sister.

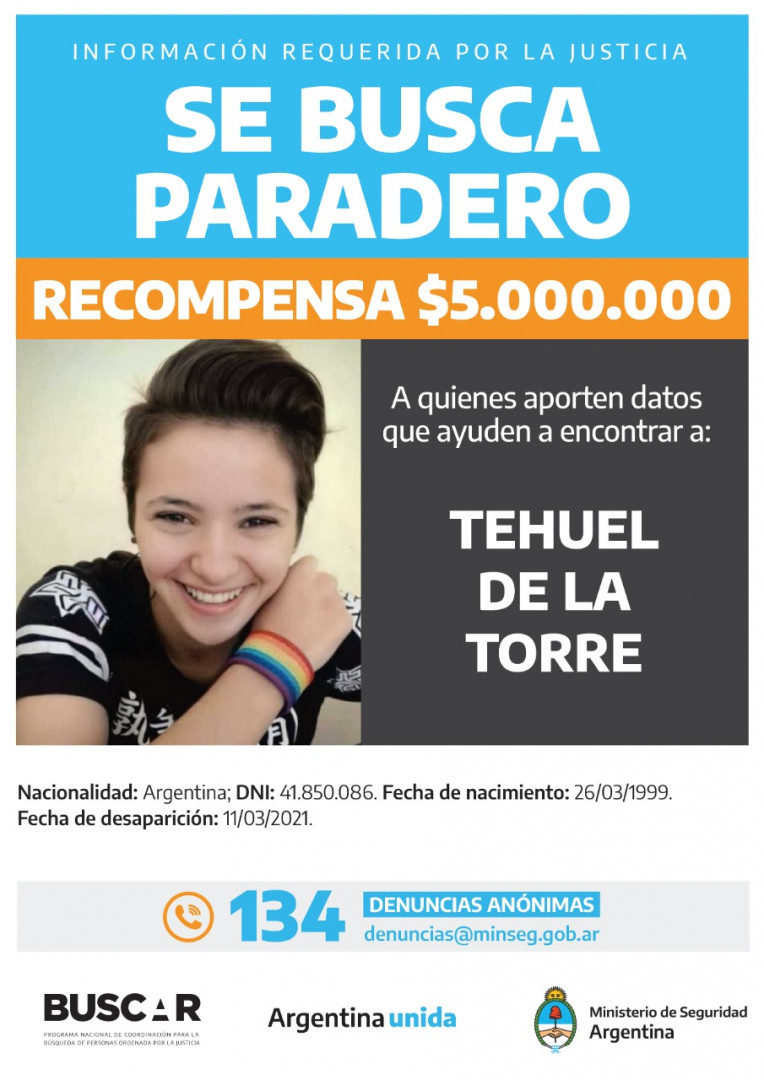
Official missing persons flyer for Tehuel de la Torre published by the Ministry of National Security.

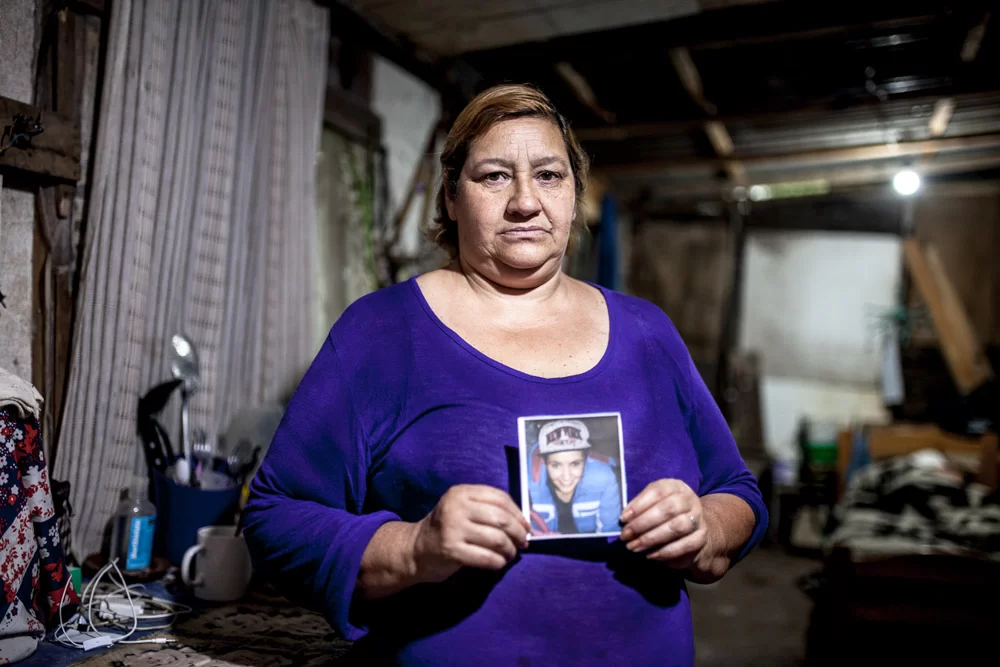
Norma, Tehuel's mother, holding a photograph of her missing son.

On 13 March, police geolocated Tehuel de la Torre's mobile phone at Ramos's home.

A destroyed phone and clothes belonging to Tehuel were found in the first raids of the Ramos's house on March 16. Blood samples were also collected at the scene for analysis.

On March 18, after learning of Tehuel's disappearance, the Department of Gender and Diversity Policies of the Municipality of San Vicente intervened and contacted the family.

On March 23, Luis Alberto Ramos was arrested in Dock Sud; he had shaved his hair and deleted the content of his mobile phone. He refused to make a statement.

On 26 March, the Buenos Aires Provincial Minister of Security, Sergio Berni, addressed the case in an interview on Crónica TV:

One is a hopeless optimist and always has to approach work with the hope of finding the best possible outcome, but the research is pointing to the worst-case scenario. Sergio Berni, excerpt from interview

On 27 March, Oscar Alfredo Montes (46), a friend of Ramos, was detained by order of prosecutor Karina Guyot. He was charged with concealment in conjunction with false testimony.

On 30 March, a photo detected on Montes's mobile phone was made public, showing Tehuel together with both detainees at Montes's home for the last time. It was saved to Tehuel's Gmail account at 20:42 on the day of his disappearance.

On April 5, Minister Estela Díaz of the Ministry of Women, Gender Policies and Sexual Diversity of the Province of Buenos Aires, met with Tehuel's family and the ministerial team, giving her commitment to closely follow the investigation.

On April 21, the Ministry of Security, through the Provincial Directorate of Registry of Missing Persons, offers a reward of between 1.5 and 2 million pesos to those who can provide data leading to Tehuel's whereabouts.

On May 26, after different testimonies within the framework of the investigation, a search was carried out with tactical divers and specialized personnel in Alejandro Korn's Mirin lagoon, close to the Ramos and Montes homes.

On June 3, searches were carried out at an ecopoint and on a CEAMSE property near the Ramos and Montes homes, giving negative results.

On June 10, a raid was carried out at the house of a neighbor of Ramos in the La Nueva Esperanza neighborhood. That same day, a woman reported having seen a person similar to Tehuel in Caleta Olivia, so the prosecutor's office sent an appeal for a sticker with his face to be made in the city.

On June 11, two searches were carried out; one on the CEAMSE property in the city of José León Suárez, and another in the home of "Agüita" (a friend of the detainees), in Alejandro Korn.

On June 15, there were raids and searches in a butcher in the neighborhood La Esperanza.

On July 22, the minister of the Ministry of National Security, Sabina Frederic, met with Andrés and Ailén de la Torre, father and sister of Tehuel, in order to evaluate progress in the case and provide search tools together with the Argentine Federal Police and the Federal Search System for Missing and Lost Persons (SIFEBU).

On August 13, through resolution number 1224/21, the Ministry of National Security of the Province of Buenos Aires doubled the reward (from 2 million to 4 million pesos) for those who could provide valid information that contributes to the whereabouts of Tehuel

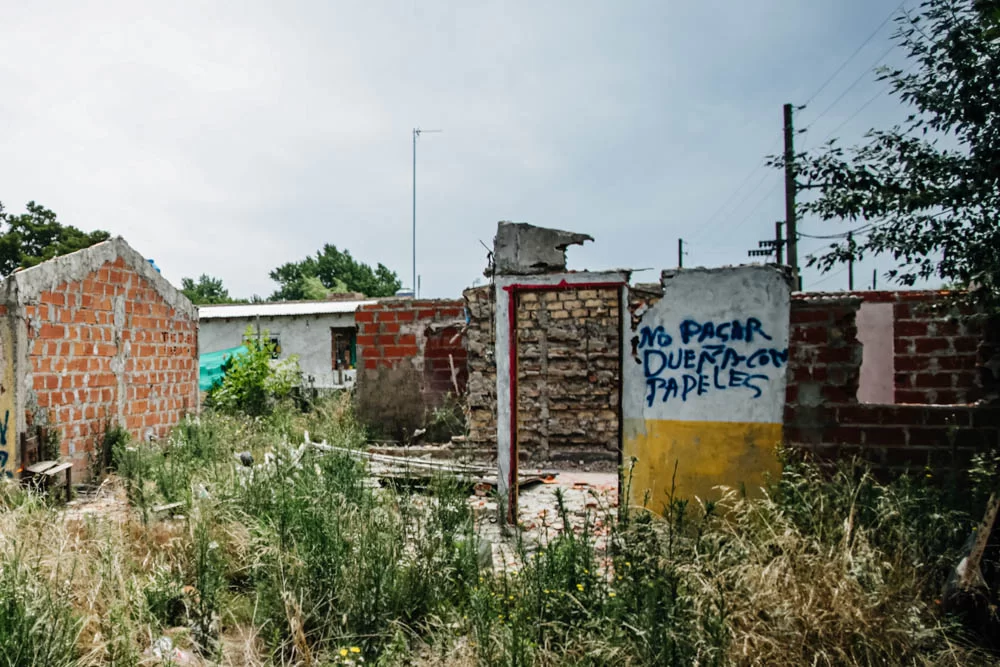
Ramos's demolished home at the end of 2021.

On 10 September a bloodstain belonging to De la Torre was found on a wall in Ramos' house.

On 9 November, Ramos and Montes were charged with aggravated homicide due to hatred of gender identity – a change from the original classification – and the prosecution took the case to trial.

At the end of 2021, Alberto Ramos's house was demolished.

==== 2022 ====
On March 11, 2022, on the anniversary of his disappearance, the Ministry of National Security increased the reward to 5 million pesos (around US$36,000 in August 2022) for information about Tehuel's whereabouts.

== Court case ==
The charges brought forth by the family are divided into two parts: On the one hand, there are Norma, his mother, and Verónica Alarcón, his older sister, represented by lawyer Alejandro Valle, focusing on prosecuting the suspects.

The strongest line of investigation is that Ramos murdered him and that there was a conspiracy between Montes and Ramos, the two individuals who have been arrested so far. In addition, there are two other people who may be involved. Alejandro Valle, Norma's lawyer

Tehuel's father, Andrés de la Torre, is represented by lawyers Marcela Mancini and Vanesa Vargas, who are part of the Collective of Translesbofeminist Lawyers, who question that the prosecutor's office focuses the investigation on the search for a body.

We are interested in all possibilities being investigated (...) Does the possibility exist that Tehuel is alive? Yes, it exists, because there is nothing in the case file that says otherwise with certainty. Two drops of blood with DNA compatible with Tehuel's relatives were found at Ramos's home, but that could have been the result of anything: a blow, a punch, some accidental cut, any number of things... That proves Tehuel was there and proves that Ramos and Montes lied, but it does not prove Tehuel is dead. Vanesa Vargas, Andrés's lawyer

=== 2021 ===
On July 17, Montes gave a false statement confirmed by the Prosecutor's Office in which he provided incorrect and false information.

On 8 November, the prosecutor's office decided to charge Ramos and Montes with aggravated homicide motivated by hatred of gender identity, a change from the original classification.

On 9 November, Ramos and Montes appeared for questioning and gave statements.

On 10 November, Ramos and Montes testified for the first time and denied all charges. They admitted to having met Tehuel de la Torre, but claimed he later went back to his home.

The prosecutor's office decides to charge them with homicide aggravated by hatred of gender identity, a change from the original qualification.

=== 2022 ===
On March 12, 2022, Martín Rizzo, Judge of Guarantees No. 8 of Cañuelas, committed the case to oral trial, case No. 6753/1776 – IPP 06-05-001038-21/00, for aggravated homicide motivated by hatred of sexual orientation and gender identity against Tehuel De la Torre. Luis Alberto Ramos and Oscar Alfredo Montes were tried for the homicide of Tehuel (article 80 of the Criminal Code) with the aggravating circumstance of hatred of gender identity, thus prosecuting them as a hate crime (subsection 4). The court accepted the splitting of the case, with the aim of continuing the search for Tehuel, under the San Vicente prosecutor's office.

On 7 September, a more extensive search was carried out across 39 fields and streams in the neighbourhood where Luis Ramos was active in the hours following Tehuel's disappearance. However, the results yielded no clear evidence of his whereabouts. Following this last field search, using trained dogs and divers in a nearby stream, no new data emerged to justify continuing with similar activities.

In November 2022, prosecutor Karina Guyot charged Oscar Alberto Montes and Luis Alberto Ramos with qualified homicide motivated by hatred of gender identity, based on evidence including analysis of security cameras, more than 20 photos on Ramos's mobile phone dated 11 March, fragments of Tehuel's mobile phone, and blood stains.

=== 2023 ===
On 29 May, Norma Nahuelcura, Tehuel de la Torre's mother, led the launch of a campaign demanding that the trial for her son's disappearance be brought forward. The inaugural press conference took place at the premises of the Bachillerato Popular Travesti Trans Mocha Celis, accompanied by various organisations and officials. Norma Nahuelcura expressed her desperation: "I want this trial to be brought forward and for them to tell me what happened to Tehuel". The family's lawyer, Flavia Centurión, revealed that the tentative trial date was August 2027 and stated: "What we are going to ask and demand is that the trial date be moved forward. We cannot wait that long for justice to tell us what happened to Tehuel". The gathering included the head of the INADI, Greta Pena, and the Under-Secretary of Diversity Policies at the Ministry of Women, Genders and Diversity, Agustina Ponce, who underlined the need for judicial reform and specific protocols for searching for missing LGBTI+ people. Gaita Nihl, tutor at the Mocha Celis school, emphasised: "When I think of Tehuel, I think he could have been any one of us".

On 14 July, the Oral Criminal Court No. 2 of La Plata brought the oral trial forward to July 2024, during the judicial recess instead of 2027, due to repeated requests for urgency given the gravity of the case by various organisations such as the Agrupación de Familiares y Amigues de Tehuel de la Torre, the Organising Committee of the Pride March – Historical Line, and the Ministry of Women, Genders and Diversity.

The San Vicente prosecutor's office focused on tracking cases of unidentified deceased persons and unidentified skeletal remains since Tehuel's disappearance. They obtained information from the National Registry of Persons and requested data from judicial departments in Buenos Aires, the Autonomous City of Buenos Aires, and nationally. The initial reports were negative.

=== 2024 ===
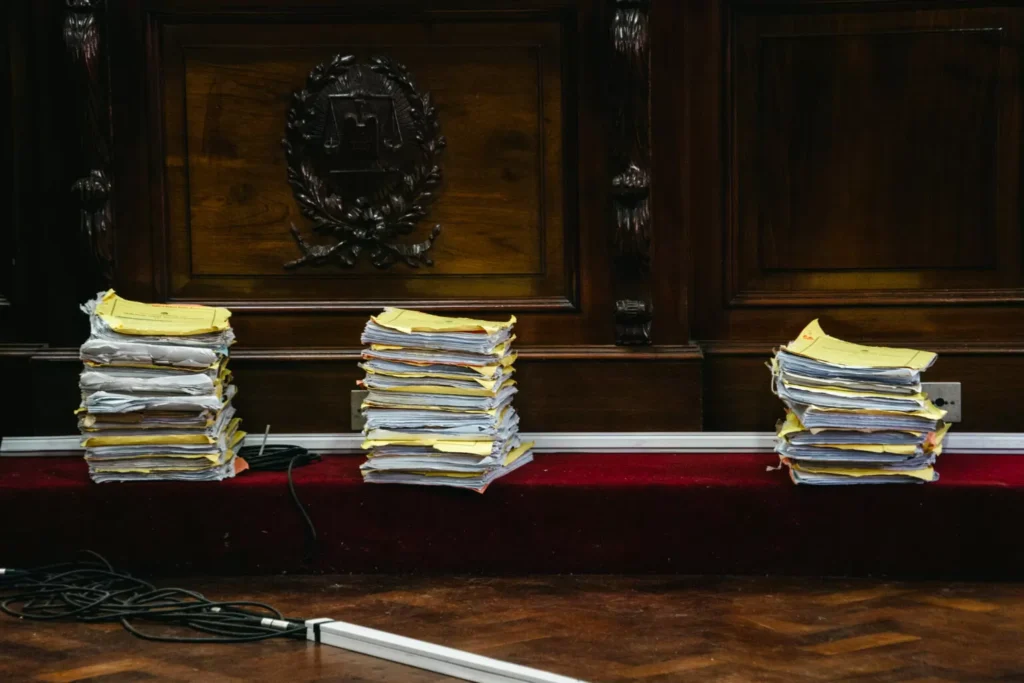
Case files for Tehuel de la Torre at the La Plata Tribunal on the first day of the 2024 trial against Luis Ramos.

At the end of June, weeks before the start of the trial scheduled for 15 July, the Oral Criminal Court (TOC) No. 2 of La Plata accepted the request of the defence of one of the accused, resulting in two separate judicial processes: one before a panel of professional judges and another as a jury trial. The decision responded to the request of Oscar Montes, who, through his new defence lawyer, argued he had not been informed of his right to choose between a jury trial and a bench trial. The court considered this request, despite it being submitted out of time, and decided to split the process. Thus, Tehuel's family faces two trials: one against Oscar Montes, whose date had not yet been set, and another against Luis Alberto Ramos, scheduled for 15 July during the judicial recess. This decision generated criticism and concern. The querelling lawyer, Flavia Centurión, indicated that this implies revictimisation for the family, who would have to go through the judicial process twice and all witnesses would have to testify again. Centurión highlighted that this measure, while responding to the accused's constitutional guarantees, contravenes the victim's right to justice without revictimising processes. Organisations such as the Frente Orgullo y Lucha expressed concern about the tribunal's decision, describing it as a "late request" that prioritises the rights of one of the accused over those of the victim and her family. They argued that this decision delays the judicial process and restricts access to justice for travesti and trans people.

==== Trial of Ramos ====
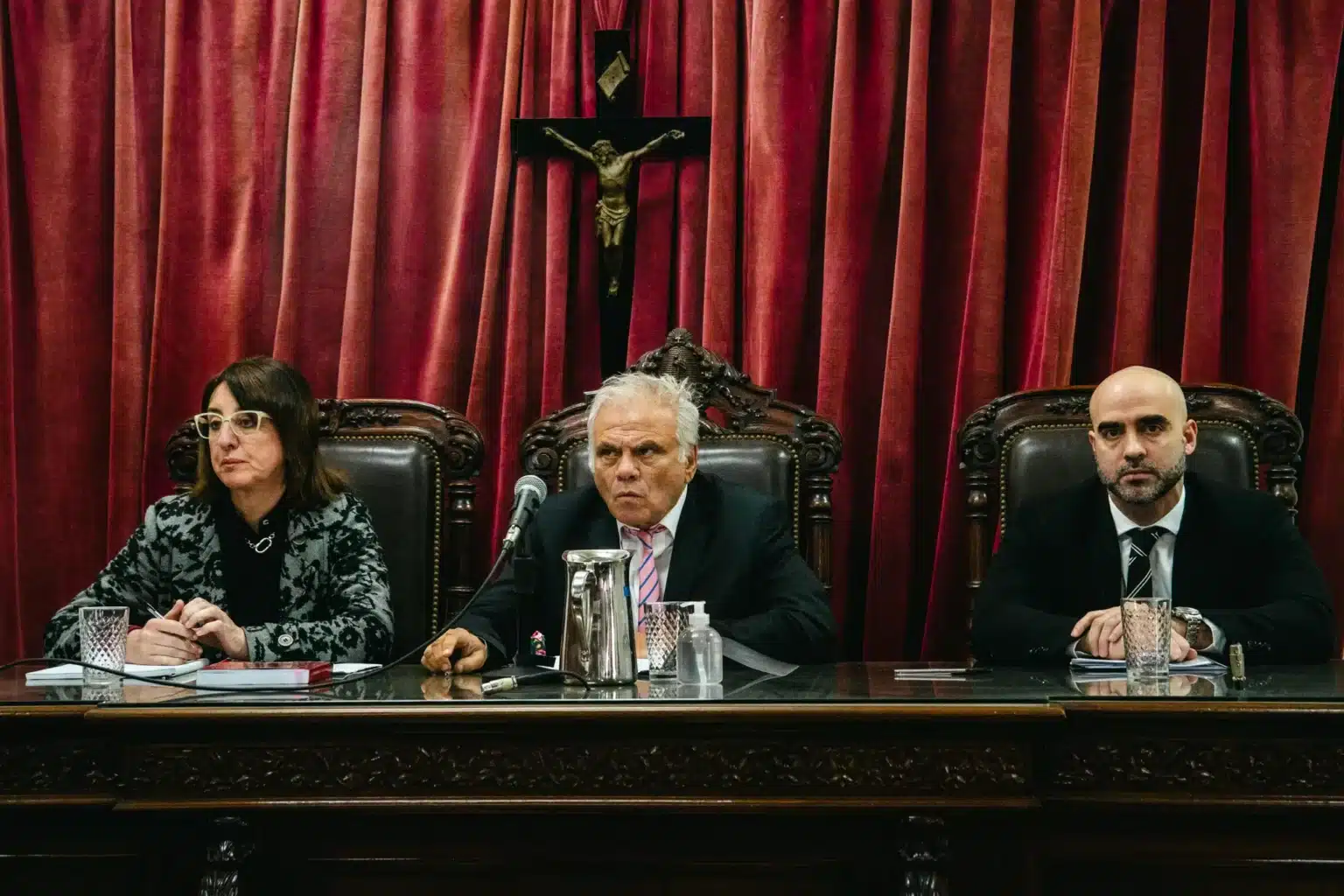
Officials in room A of the TOC 2 of La Plata on 15 July 2024. Comprising: presiding judge Claudio Joaquín Bernard, vice-president Silvia Edit Hoerr, and panel member Ramiro Fernández Lorenzo.

Luis Alberto Ramos is the sole defendant in the trial held from 15 to 26 July at the Oral Criminal Court No. 2 of La Plata (Calle 8 between 56 and 57). His friend Oscar Alberto Montes, who faces a jury trial, does not yet have an established date. The family's lawyer, Flavia Centurión, noted that facing two trials represents a "situation of revictimisation" for Tehuel's family. During this first trial, hearings were held Monday to Friday, from 10:00 to 18:00. It was expected that between 60 and 90 witnesses would testify, who would also have to testify at the second trial. The tribunal was composed of Claudio Joaquín Bernard, Silvia Hoerr, and Ramiro Fernández Lorenzo. Activist organisations invited people to accompany the daily hearings from 10:00 to 18:00 in front of the Tribunal located at Calle 8 between 56 and 57 in La Plata. Events planned for those days included an open radio broadcast, a collective embrace, and various cultural activities.

- 15 July: The first day of the trial for the disappearance of Tehuel de la Torre took place at Oral Criminal Court No. 2 of La Plata. From early morning, in front of the Judiciary building, activists gathered with an open radio broadcast and activities to accompany the two-week hearings planned for this trial against Luis Ramos. Shortly after 11 in the morning, the tribunal opened the session in room A on the first floor, with a frayed burgundy curtain as a backdrop and an enormous crucifix. Ramos, the sole defendant in this trial, accused of being co-perpetrator of aggravated homicide motivated by hatred of sexual orientation and gender identity, arrived handcuffed and under custody of the Buenos Aires Penitentiary Service. He sat next to his defence lawyer, Natalia Argenti.

The list of people called to testify on the first day of the trial changed at the last minute. Initially, nine people were expected to testify: six related to Tehuel de la Torre's family and three with reserved identities. However, six people ultimately testified, some of whom were not originally scheduled.

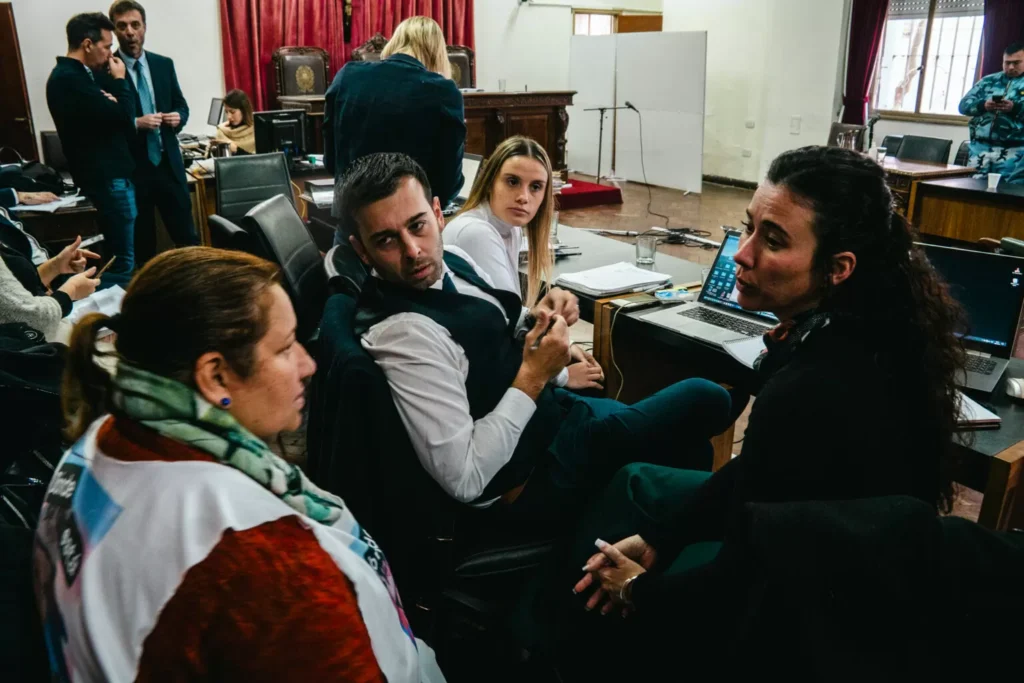
Tehuel's mother and her lawyers at the tribunal on 15 July 2024

The first to testify was Norma Nahuelcurá, Tehuel's mother, who described what her son's life was like and what the days before his disappearance were like. Norma recalled that Tehuel was a young man who enjoyed football and was always in contact with her. She recounted that on 10 March 2021 she saw him for the last time, and the following day began to worry when Tehuel did not respond to her messages. Norma mentioned that Tehuel had been contacted by a man called "Luigi" for a job as a waiter, who turned out to be Luis Ramos. Michelle L., Tehuel's girlfriend, also testified and described her relationship with him, mentioning the difficulties they faced because of his trans identity. She recounted that Tehuel was looking for work but could not find it because employers did not want to hire a trans man. Michelle described the day of the disappearance, when Tehuel received a call for a job and left on his bicycle, and how she later tried to locate Ramos when Tehuel did not return.

Several people who testified requested to do so without Ramos present in the room out of fear of reprisals, although not all requests were granted. Catalina S., a former partner of Ramos, stated that she had suffered violence at his hands and that she had reported abuse committed by Ramos. During the recess, before the last witness's statement, the lawyers shared details about the progress of the trial. Tehuel's mother, Norma Nahuelcurá, expressed her gratitude, and Mónica Galván, representative of the Asociación Familiares y Amigues de Tehuel, also spoke. Other witnesses, such as Julio Elías Agüero, and his neighbours Romina Lobosco and Ricardo García Somaruga, described episodes of violence and aggressive behaviour by Ramos.

Among the audience were deputy Mónica Macha; the Minister of Women, Gender Policy and Sexual Diversity of the Province of Buenos Aires, Estela Díaz; Florencia Guimaraes, of the Access to Rights Programme for travesti and trans people at the Women's Justice Centre of the Council of the Magistrature of Buenos Aires; Martín Canevaro from 100% Diversidad y Derechos; Darío Arias from ILGA LAC and Conurbanxs por la Diversidad; and Marcela Tobaldi from La Rosa Naranja. These organisations form part of the Frente Orgullo y Lucha, which has been working to ensure the trial is conducted with a gender perspective. Also in attendance were Lucía Portos, Under-Secretary of Gender and Sexual Diversity of Buenos Aires; provincial deputy Laura Cano; and Soledad Mendé, Director of Gender and Diversity of San Vicente, representing mayor Nicolás Mantegazza. Representatives of other organisations supporting the Commission of Families and Friends of Tehuel were also present.

The session ended around three in the afternoon. Thirteen witnesses were announced for the following day, and outside the tribunal, activists continued with their activities, music, and expressions of support.

At the close of the day, travesti activist Florencia Guimaraes stated:

It is important to be here, to organise ourselves to come. For Justice to see that we have a network and also to learn what our needs are.

Tehuel's mother, Norma Nahuelcurá, thanked all those present and expressed her determination to continue fighting for justice for her son.

- 16 July: During the second hearing of the trial against Luis Ramos, the last witness of the day, Priscila M., was arrested upon completing her testimony for having committed perjury. Throughout the trial, Priscila M. revealed that she had had a close relationship with Ramos and denied knowing Tehuel, although contradictions in her account and WhatsApp messages she exchanged with Ramos suggested otherwise. This behaviour led to her immediate arrest by the tribunal, as her testimony was deemed full of omissions and falsehoods.

During this hearing, in addition to Priscila M., other witnesses testified and provided details about Ramos's behaviour. These testimonies described incidents such as the theft of pills and threats with a knife by Ramos, as well as suspicious encounters with neighbours and situations in which information about Tehuel was concealed.

- 17 July: On the third day of the trial for the disappearance of Tehuel de la Torre, several police officers who participated in the raids on the homes of Ramos and Oscar Montes, the other defendant, testified. Expert witness Federico Di Luca presented the movements of Tehuel's phone, indicating that the last signal emitted was from Ramos's home. Other testimonies confirmed the presence of blood stains and remnants of a burnt jacket in Ramos's home, as well as the shell of a mobile phone belonging to Tehuel.

The testimonies of the police officers who participated in the raids and the analysis of communications between the phones of Tehuel and Ramos found traces of blood in Ramos's home, a stained mattress and sheets, and a WhatsApp profile with incriminating messages. They testified that Ramos was captured in Avellaneda after attempting to hide and change his appearance, and that he was carrying a knife and clonazepam tablets.

- 18 July: On the fourth day of the trial, eleven forensic experts and police officers who participated in the search of Luis Ramos's home testified, as did those who conducted the forensic examination that helped reconstruct the young man's last known locations. These statements were called by the prosecution led by Juan Pablo Caniggia.

During the first raid of Ramos's home, forensic police experts Piro, Paz, and Navamuel explained the discovery of evidentiary items including a Motorola phone shell; a piece of fabric similar to that of a mattress; inside the house, on a yellow wall, blood stains were identified which were confirmed as compatible with human blood by biochemist Darío Flores; remnants of a blue and red jacket with white details that had been burned in a shrub. The characteristics of the jacket matched the one Tehuel was wearing on the day of his disappearance, which allowed witness Sofía V., an official from the DDI of La Plata, to track him on security cameras in a local supermarket. Condoms were also found, although it could not be determined if they had been used, and numerous loose and tied dogs were found on the property, which attracted the attention of the experts.

Among the forensic evidence included in the case, a photo of Montes, Ramos, and Tehuel was recovered from one of the examined phones. Computer forensic expert Carlos Gianni Nouzelles was able to access Tehuel's Gmail account and determine that his last connection was just after midnight on 12 March 2021. Luis Ramos was detained on 23 March 2021 in Avellaneda, in a dishevelled state and carrying a knife and pills. The last witness, Guillermo Galván, head of the Scientific Police of San Vicente, testified that Ramos's home was demolished during one of the interventions.

- 19 July: On the fifth hearing of the trial of Luis Alberto Ramos, a psychologist who had interviewed the accused and a colleague from the MST who described the relationship between Tehuel and Ramos testified.

During this hearing, the Tribunal rejected the request by the lawyers of Norma Nahuelcurá, Tehuel's mother, to include the testimony of a representative of the trans community, which they considered key to understanding the reality from a direct perspective. In the trial, testimony had been given only by cisgender people.

Norma Nahuelcurá expressed her gratitude for the support of activists outside the courthouse.

Karina Sorokowski, a psychologist from the Provincial Ministry of Security who interviewed Luis Ramos to prepare a psychological profile during the investigation into Tehuel's disappearance, reported that they noticed "breaks in the discourse" of the accused. Sorokowski described Ramos as initially cooperative and verbose, but with manipulative behaviour. She explained that, despite his empathetic discourse, Ramos showed a lack of affectivity and empathy, which appeared to indicate an attempt at self-protection.

Andrea Licolich, who knew Ramos and Tehuel through the MST, recounted that it was Ramos who introduced Tehuel as "a girl friend" (Note: The word used was amiga, which is the Spanish word for "girl friend" and has the feminine termination "a".) and that, although there was a good friendship, she had suggested to Tehuel that he distance himself from Ramos, as she noticed that Ramos did not perceive him as a man. Licolich also mentioned that Ramos had said of Tehuel "it was a waste of a woman to have become a man", and that the Movement consulted its members about their preferences for activities, revealing Ramos's traditional opinions on gender.

The Tribunal examined whether Ramos was in a position of power over Tehuel. Both the psychologist who interviewed Ramos and the psychologists who spoke with Tehuel's family discussed this question. It is known that Tehuel was in a vulnerable situation and that Ramos used to provide him with informal work and financial assistance. Tehuel's family described the relationship with Ramos as a combination of friendship and employment support, considering Ramos as someone who listened to him.

- 25 July: During the sixth hearing of the trial of Luis Ramos, new evidence was presented from experts in telephony, genetics, and forensic psychology, as well as Tehuel's sister, who offered testimony about the night of his disappearance and the days that followed.

The experts who examined the phones of Ramos, Oscar Montes (the other accused), and Priscila M. (the witness arrested for perjury) gave testimony, reconstructing the timeline of Tehuel's disappearance. Tehuel's phone showed signals near Ramos's address on 12 March at 9:42 a.m., one day after his disappearance. The experts confirmed that someone had manipulated the phone. In addition, a forensic genetics expert confirmed that a blood stain found in Ramos's home belonged to Tehuel, with 99.9% certainty.

Daniel Osorio, a forensic psychologist, described Ramos as a violent and manipulative person with psychopathic traits. Osorio observed that Ramos made efforts to present himself as a victim and underlined the accused's lack of empathy. He also mentioned that the relationship between Ramos and Tehuel had a significant asymmetry in terms of age and economic situation, placing Tehuel in a vulnerable position.

Verónica Alarcón, Tehuel's sister, recounted her last encounter with him on 11 March 2021. Tehuel told her he was going to the home of a friend called Luiggi for a job as a waiter. Verónica described the clothes Tehuel was wearing that night.

Among those present at the tribunal were several activist figures and family members, who gave their support to Tehuel's mother and highlighted the importance of visibility and solidarity, and called for a festival during the closing arguments to raise awareness of violence against trans people and demand justice. The following day was expected to bring the final statements from the prosecution, Ramos's defence, and the complaint.

- 26 July: In the final day of the trial, the prosecution, the complaint, and the defence presented their closing arguments before the La Plata Tribunal, reviewing evidence, testimony, and relevant facts in the case. Despite not having found Tehuel's body, the evidence suggests he was the victim of a homicide motivated by hatred of his gender identity.

Both the prosecution and the complaint requested a life sentence for Luis Alberto Ramos, accused of aggravated homicide motivated by hatred of gender identity. They also requested the implementation of community reparation measures for travesti and trans people. In contrast, Ramos's defence requested acquittal, alleging a lack of definitive evidence.

Prosecutor Juan Pablo Caniggia presented a detailed reconstruction of events between the night of 11 March and the early hours of 12 March 2021. He stated that Ramos and the other accused, Oscar Montes, caused Tehuel's death due to hatred of his gender identity. He cited evidence such as witness testimony, the analysis of Tehuel's phone, and evidence found in Ramos's home, including blood stains and burnt remnants of Tehuel's belongings. The prosecutor also highlighted Ramos's violent personality and his transphobic remarks. The complaint lawyers emphasised the aggravating factor of hatred of gender identity, describing the brutality of the crime and its impact on the family and the trans community. They also requested the implementation of a specific protocol for searching for missing trans people and a declaration of social emergency to combat violence against this community. Defence lawyer Natalia Argenti questioned the validity of the evidence and proposed several alternative theories about what may have happened to Tehuel, including the possibility that he is alive. She rejected the idea that the crime was motivated by hatred of gender identity and requested Ramos's acquittal, arguing that his guilt had not been proven beyond reasonable doubt.

At the hearing, LGBTI+ rights organisations, together with family members of other victims of violence, held a festival near the tribunal in support of the cause. At the close of the hearing, a march was held to demand justice for Tehuel and other victims of violence. This event coincided with the anniversary of the disappearance of Johana Ramallo, another young woman who suffered violence. The march concluded with a balloon release and a commemorative event.

The Tribunal scheduled the verdict for 30 August. Although the judicial process is generally resolved in fewer than five working days, the judges took over a month to deliver their decision due to workload.

- 30 August: The Oral Criminal Court No. 2 of La Plata sentenced Luis Alberto Ramos to life imprisonment for the murder of Tehuel de la Torre, in a ruling that considers the crime as aggravated by hatred of the victim's gender identity. The tribunal also found Ramos guilty as co-perpetrator of both the homicide and the disappearance of Tehuel's body.

For 40 minutes, two court secretaries read aloud the verdict signed by judge Claudio Bernard, president of the Oral Criminal Court No. 2 of La Plata; some of its passages read:

The defendant not only took Tehuel's life motivated by hatred of his gender identity, but also sought to make disappear the only tangible thing that remains of a human being when they die, preventing his loved ones from having his body to say goodbye to him. [...] Ramos did not share these non-patriarchal models of conceiving of a couple. He established the parameters of his personal relationship with Tehuel by not publicly recognising his sexual identity with phrases such as 'boy girl' or 'woman is for man and man is for woman', which cannot but be taken as disparaging. Furthermore, he conditioned him economically by promising him work and offering him money, thus creating an economic dependency, so there is no doubt that the defendant took advantage of the victim's vulnerability.

== Effects ==
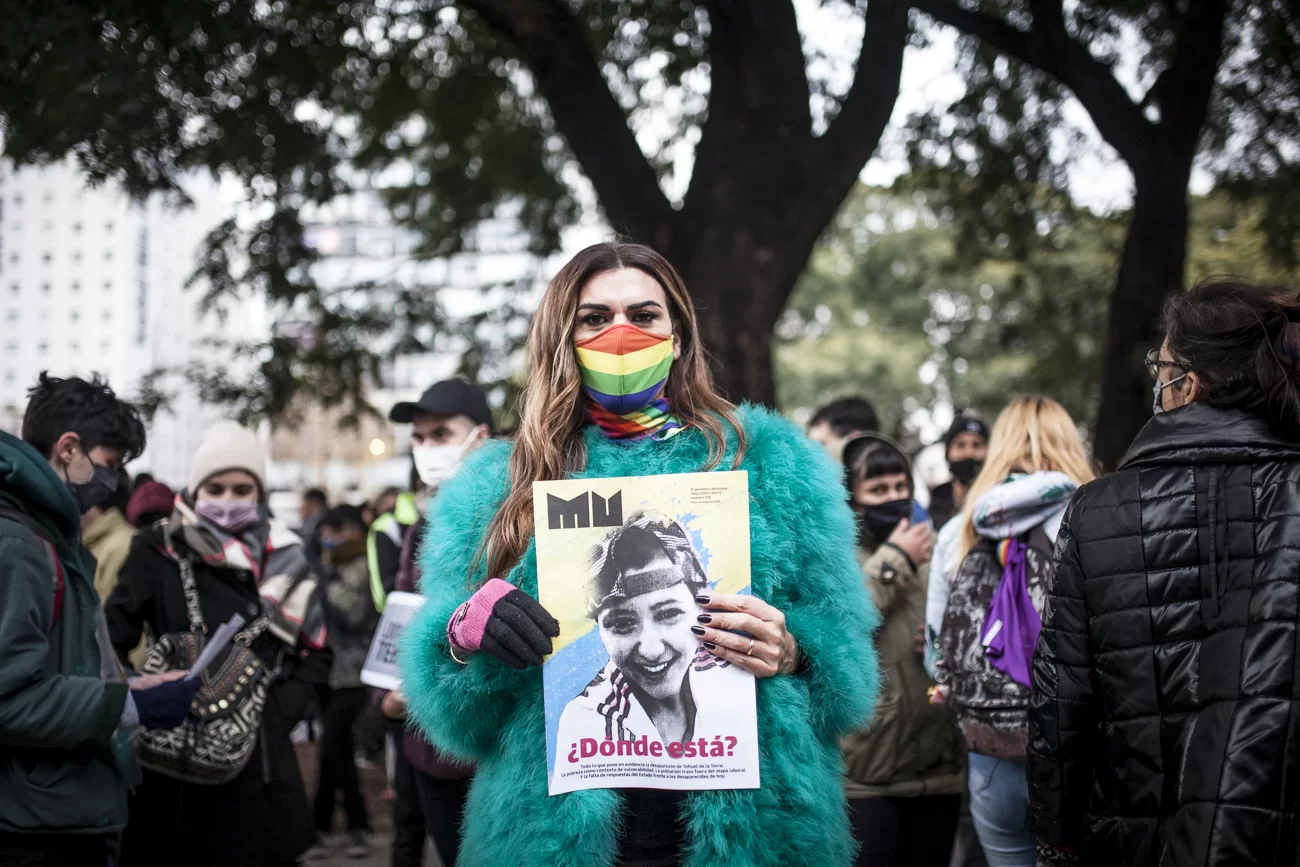
Florencia de la V holding the cover of Revista Mu dedicated to Tehuel de la Torre at the Buenos Aires LGBT Pride March in 2021.

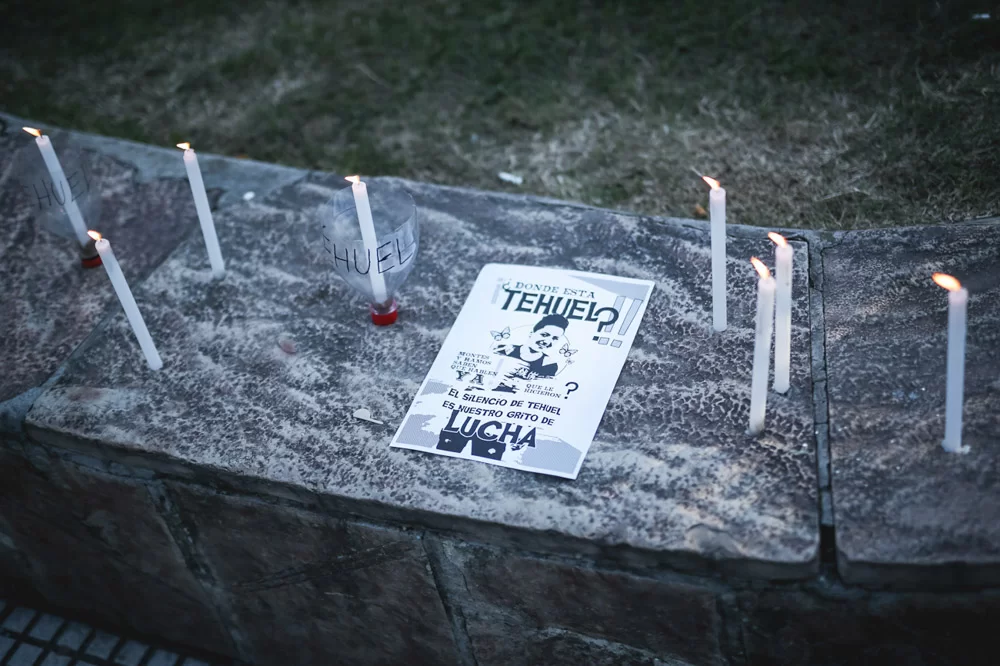
Flyer for Tehuel surrounded by candles at one of the Torchlight Marches (Marchas de las antorchas).

The case of the disappearance of Tehuel de la Torre has had social repercussions at the national level in Argentina, which has become a cause of struggle for the LGBT movement, particularly for the trans male community. The group Autoconvocadxs por Tehuel has also been created, which concentrates efforts to spread awareness of the cause and calls for various activities.

The case has drawn support from LGBT organisations and figures such as Quimey Ramos and Florencia de la V and human rights organisations such as the Permanent Assembly for Human Rights, the Center for Legal and Social Studies, CORREPI, as well as several political parties such as the Workers' Left Front, and trade unions such as FEDUBA and the Asociación Trabajadores del Estado.

Demonstrations, marches, and various activities have taken place in different parts of the country demanding Tehuel's appearance and clarification of the case.

=== Media coverage ===
The case of Tehuel's disappearance was taken up by the news channels due to activism. It was at times addressed in a discriminatory manner (Note: On the channel C5N, Tehuel was referred to using feminine pronouns for several days.) and associated with criminalisation, pathologisation, and a distrustful view of the victim's life.

The case has also been covered by several international media outlets.

On 13 July 2024, the podcast Tehuel, una bandera de lucha was launched by Tiempo Argentino and Agencia Presentes, narrating the story of Tehuel de la Torre. Through testimonies from his mother, activists, and lawyers, the podcast reconstructs the search, questions the justice system, and analyses the living conditions of the trans community. This university project, consisting of two episodes of approximately 15 minutes each, arose as a graduation project and highlights the shortcomings in the systematisation of the search for missing persons in Argentina. It also examines the judicial process, particularly the granting of a jury trial to one of the accused, which could revictimise the family. The podcast also underlines the importance of the Travesti Trans Labour Quota Law and seeks to raise public awareness about the structural inequalities faced by this community. Some of the interviews and narration were conducted at the Espacio Cultural La Homero Manzi, while the final editing was carried out at the Centre for Audiovisual Production and Research (CePIA) of the Faculty of Social Sciences of the UBA.

=== Demonstrations ===
==== 2021 ====
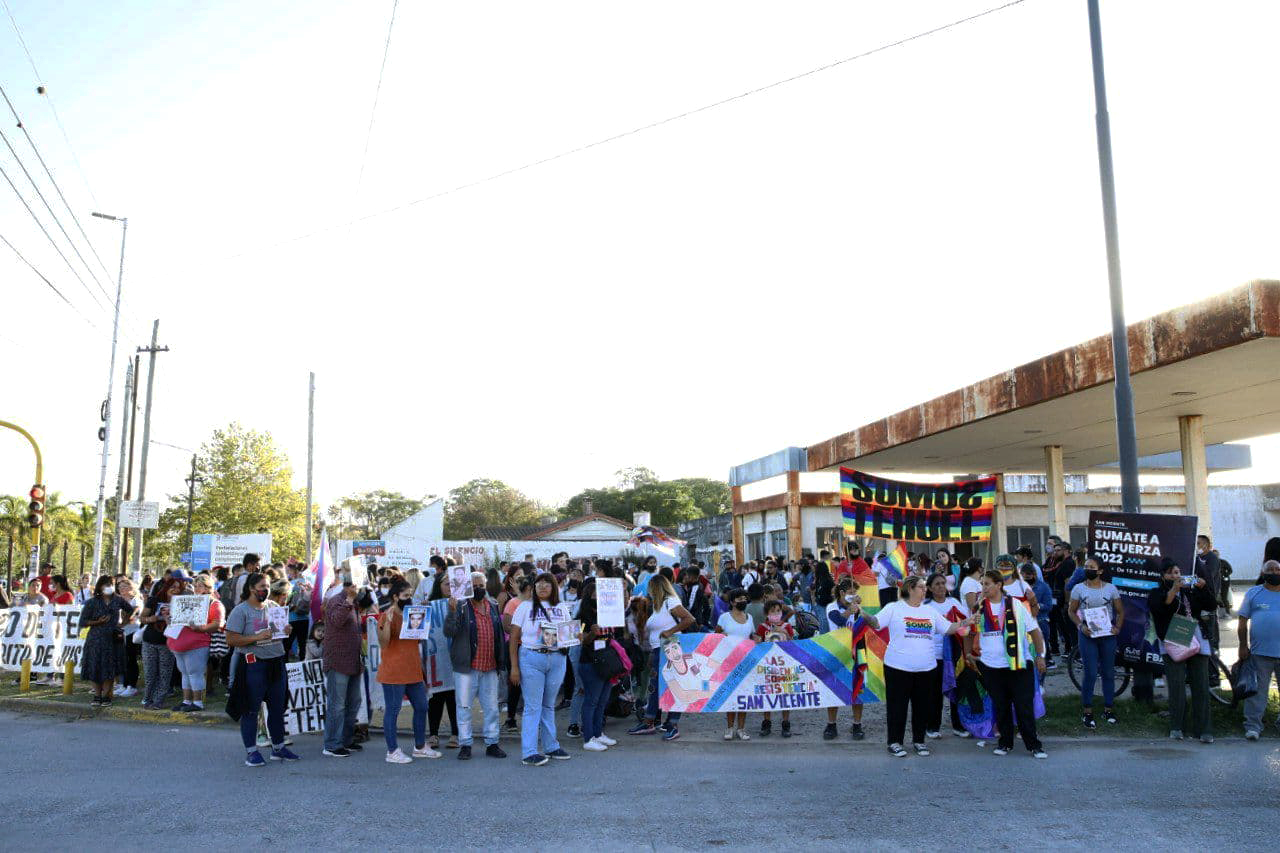
Demonstration in Alejandro Korn calling for justice for Tehuel on the one-year anniversary of his disappearance

- On March 26, 2021, coinciding with Tehuel's 22nd birthday, the first Torchlight March was held in San Vicente.
- On April 11, 2021, a "tweetathon" was held for Tehuel. One month after his disappearance, the organizations that support the cause carried out a dissemination activity on the social network Twitter. The next day, a national call was made through LGBT organizations to gather in all the squares and public spaces of the country to demand their search and appearance alive.
- On May 11, the second Torchlight March was held by family members, neighbors and self-organized people.
- On June 11 and August 11, after three and five months without Tehuel, torchlight marches were organised in different squares across the country.

==== 2022 ====
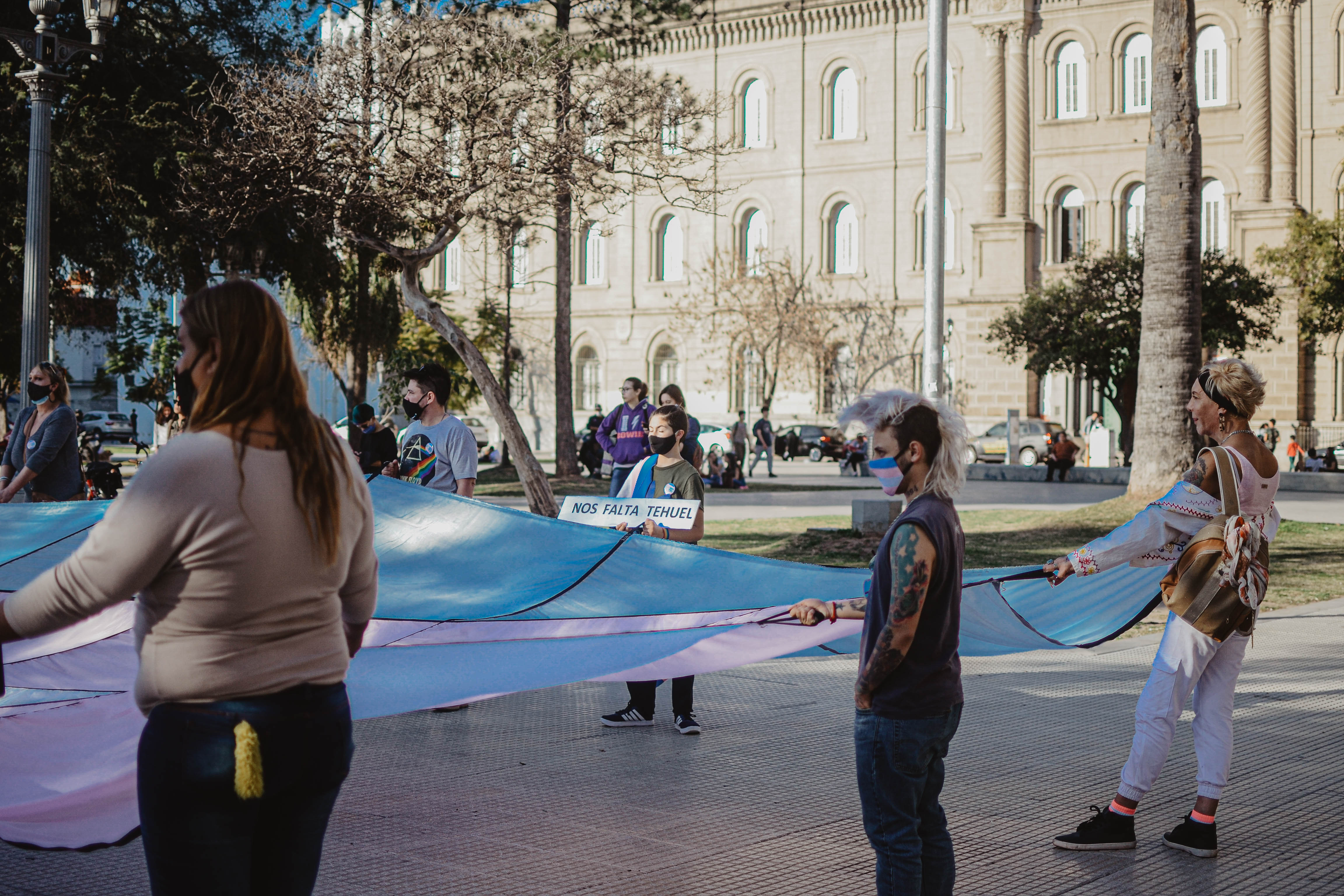
Trans flag-waving action by the Archivo de la Memoria Trans in the city of Santa Fe. Among the slogans visible is a sign referring to Tehuel. In the centre, activist Giovi Novello participating in the action. 23 July 2021.

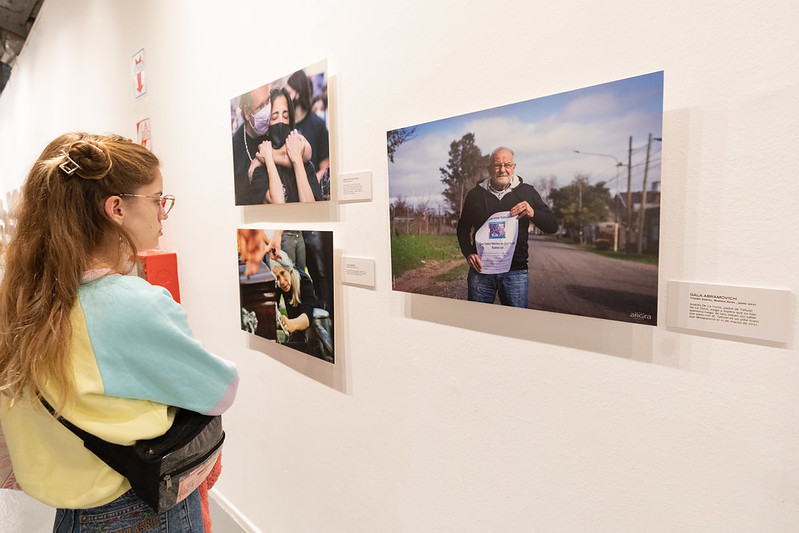
A young woman views a photograph of Tehuel's father demanding justice at the 33rd Annual Exhibition of Argentine Photojournalism at the Centro Cultural Borges in Galerías Pacífico

- On 11 February 2022, during the 10th Pride March in Necochea, Pierina Nochetti participated in an activity in which a graffito with the question "Where is Tehuel?" was painted on an abandoned building, commemorating Tehuel de la Torre, which triggered a legal controversy. The Necochea justice system accused Nochetti of causing "serious damage" to historical heritage, basing the charge on a photograph published on a news portal showing a person from behind in front of the mural. The trial against Pierina was scheduled for 6 March 2024 at the Correctional Court No. 1 of Necochea, but was postponed due to the judge Ernesto Juliano being on leave. The defence considers the charge to be motivated by political persecution and the repression of Pierina's activism. The situation has had a profound impact on Nochetti's life; she faces a possible sentence of up to four years and has seen her employment opportunities reduced. Organisations such as Amnesty International and the Center for Legal and Social Studies have intervened in the case, calling for Pierina's acquittal and defending the right to peaceful protest. The community continues to mobilise in support of Nochetti while awaiting a new date for the hearing.
- On March 11, 2022 at 7 p.m., commemorating one year since his disappearance, a march was held calling for his appearance and justice in Alejandro Korn, which had the support of the Ministry of Women, Gender and Diversity.
  Our country has made enormous advances, but the phenomenon is structural and global, which is why we must deepen public policies that break down barriers to the exercise of rights. Let us remember that Tehuel disappeared while going in search of a job.
  — Greta Pena, Under-Secretary of Diversity Policies of the Nation

In addition, a mural in memory of Tehuel was placed at the San Vicente Station Cultural Center.

== Works ==
- Desaparecidxs en democracia. Capítulo cuarto: ¿Dónde está Tehuel?, 11 March 2023. Documentary series.
- Tehuel, una bandera de lucha, podcast (2024).
- Piñeiro, Claudia (1 November 2023). "4. De otros intereses y preocupaciones". Escribir un silencio. Buenos Aires, Argentina: Alfaguara. p. 432. ISBN 9786313010202. "Si no hay cuerpo, ¿No hay delito?"

== See also ==
- List of murder convictions without a body
- List of people killed for being transgender
- Transgender rights in Argentina
- Violence against transgender people
- Hate crime
- Transphobia

== Primary bibliography ==
- "Línea de tiempo de la desaparición y búsqueda de Tehuel" [Timeline of the disappearance and search for Tehuel]. agenciapresentes.org (in Spanish). Agencia Presentes. 15 June 2021.

== Additional bibliography ==
- Junco, Silvina (2022). "La (in)visibilización de las identidades trans en la prensa argentina: Una mirada crítica del discurso de los medios de comunicación" [The (in)visibility of trans identities in the Argentine press: A critical look at media discourse.] (PDF). Ratio Iuris. Revista de Derecho Privado (in Spanish). 10 (1). Universidad de Ciencias Empresariales y Sociales (UCES): 407–441. ISSN 2347-0151.
- VINACCIA, Antonella; MONTEVERDE, Camila (June 2021). "Sobre la representación de la identidad de Tehuel de la Torre: ¿medios tradicionales vs. medios alternativos o medios tradicionales y medios alternativos?" [On the representation of Tehuel de la Torre's identity: traditional media vs. alternative media or traditional media and alternative media?] (PDF). Anáfora. (in Spanish). 6. Departamento de Letras de la Facultad de Filosofía y Letras (Universidad de Buenos Aires): 78–94.
