= Alejandro Korn =

Argentine psychiatrist and philosopher (1860–1936)

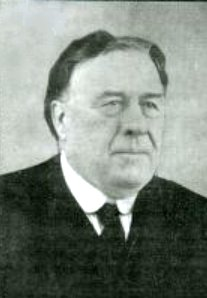
- Born: 3 May 1860; San Vicente, Buenos Aires, Argentina
- Died: October 9, 1936 (aged 76); La Plata, Argentina
- Resting place: La Plata Cemetery

Philosophical work
- Era: 20th-century philosophy
- Region: Western Philosophy
- School: Antipositivism; 1918 University Reform
- Main interests: Axiology, freedom, history of Argentine philosophy
- Notable ideas: Creative freedom, Latin American philosophy, Value as the ideal answer to real disvalue

Alejandro Korn (3 May 1860 – 9 October 1936) was an Argentine psychiatrist, philosopher, reformist and politician. For eighteen years, he was the director of the psychiatry hospital in Melchor Romero (a locality of La Plata in Buenos Aires). He was the first university official in Latin America to be elected thanks to the student's vote. He is considered to be the pioneer of Argentine philosophy. Along with Florentino Ameghino, Juan Vucetich, Almafuerte and Carlos Spegazzini, he is considered to be one of the five wise men of La Plata.

== Biography ==
=== Childhood, youth and family ===
Alejandro Korn was born in San Vicente, Buenos Aires. His father, Carlos Adolfo Korn, was a liberal German-Prussian doctor and soldier, who had refused to take part in the repression that followed the worker's strike in the textile sector during the Social Revolution in 1848. Sentenced to death, he fled to Switzerland on horseback. There, he studied Medicine and met his future wife, María Verena Meyer. He decided to migrate to Argentina, and there they got married. He settled down in San Vicente (Buenos Aires), where he worked as a doctor and a judge. He promoted the construction of the first flour mill and the lengthening of the railroad tracks to reach the city. He distinguished for his remarkable work fighting the cholera epidemics, and, for that reason, he was awarded by the president Domingo F. Sarmiento. When he died, in 1905, the city of San Vicente paid him homage.

Alejandro Korn was the eldest of eight siblings. His only brother, Mauricio, would also become a doctor. In his youth, Alejandro showed an interest in culture and sport. In 1877 he settled down in Buenos Aires to study, first at the Colegio Nacional de Buenos Aires and later at the Universidad de Buenos Aires's College of Medicine.

Afterwards, he met and married María Villafañe, and settled in La Plata. They had seven children, four of which survived childhood. One of them, Alejandro Korn Villafañe, was instrumental in the University Reform and is distinguished for his insights into Catholic doctrine and his teaching position at the modern Escuela de La Plata. His other son, Guillermo Korn, was a left-wing reformer and student leader, journalist, leader of the Socialist Party and national deputy; as well as being a playwright and the founder of the Teatro del Pueblo in La Plata.

=== Doctor ===
He graduated in 1882, with his thesis Locura y crimen (“Insanity and crime”). He worked in the small towns of Navarro and Ranchos, where he was living at the time.

In 1888 he was appointed to police doctor. In 1897 he was appointed to director of the Hospital Provincial de Melchor Romero, a hospital-colony with a surface of 80 hectares (which he would afterwards increase to 180 hectares), designed by his lodge mate Pedro Benoit, placed 10 kilometers away from La Plata city, where Benoit lived.

It was inaugurated as a hospital in 1884, but then it specialized in treating mental diseases. It was the first hospital of its kind in Argentine, and, probably, in Latin America. Korn acted as director of Melchor Romero Hospital until 1916, when he resigned from the title in order to devote all his time and energies to philosophy. From 1900 onwards, his brother Mauricia Korn also worked there.

In 1910 he founded the Medical Association of La Plata where he acted as its president.

=== Freemason ===
Alejandro Korn entered in the Argentine Freemasonry on 15 June 1881, aged 21, in the Germania Nº 19 lodge. His father had entered the same lodge in Germany, and was a long-standing and influential member, who had in fact helped his lodge establish in Argentina, with the help of his Freemason Brothers in the country.

When he was 23 years old, Alejandro was appointed to Venerable Maestro (“Venerable Master”) of his lodge. Later, he entered the La Plata Nº 80 lodge, which included other influential inhabitants of La Plata such as Carlos Spegazzini and Pedro Benoit.

=== Politician ===
He was a member of Unión Cívica Radical (“Radical Civic Union”) since its foundation in 1891, and, in the 1893 Revolution, he was appointed by the Revolutionary Junta to La Plata's Intendant, a title that he held for some days until the defeat of the Revolution. In 1894, he was elected as a deputy of the UCR. He resigned from the title in 1897, to express his disapproval of a series of acts of corruption in the “Banco Hipotecario”, in which several other members he knew where involved.

In 1917 he was elected as a deputy of La Plata again as part of UCR, and he opted to the title of national deputy in 1918. In that year, he left the UCR, embraced the socialist beliefs and wrote Socialismo ético (“Ethical socialism”) and Incipit Vita Nova:

The new philosophy will liberate us from the nightmare of mechanic automatism, and will give us back the dignity of our conscious free personality, free and master of its own destiny…If we want a better world, we will build it… Socialism itself, beyond Marx’s well-known theorem, asks for solidarity, that is to say, a theoretical feeling.

In 1931 he entered the Socialist Party (Argentina). In 1934 he gave a much-praised series of lectures in the “Casa del Pueblo de la Ciudad de Buenos Aires” (“Buenos Aires’s People’s House”). The lectures were titled Jean Jaurés, Hegel y Marx (“Hegel and Marx”), and Antimarx, and were published by the Revista Socialista (“Socialist magazine”) in February 1935.

In 1934 he was elected to be a “convencional constituyente” to help rewrite the Constitution of the Buenos Aires Province, but he resigned from that title as a protest for the fraud that the government had committed in those elections, as did Alfredo Palacios and his son Guillermo Korn.

=== University Reformist ===
Alejandro Korn was not only a teacher, but a high-level official in La Plata's and Buenos Aires's Universities as well. He was also involved in the students’ reformist movement. In fact, both of his sons were leaders of students’ groups, though different ones.

In 1903 he entered in the National University of La Plata as councillor and vice-rector, when it was still a provincial one and Dardo Rocha was its rector. From that moment, he was the associate professor of the History of Philosophy Cathedra. The Obstetrics School was created thanks to his initiative.

In 1919, in a moment of social unrest, the students’ movement chose him to be responsible for the university, together with Carlos Spegazzini and Edelmiro Calvo. In 1906 he entered as a teacher of the History of Philosophy Cathedra in Buenos Aires's University's Philosophy Faculty. In 1912 he was elected Faculty councillor, a title he held until 1918. That year, with the University Reform as background, he was elected dean by the students of the Philosophy Faculty in the University of Buenos Aires, a title he held until 1921.

In 1918, Korn was one of the professors, together with José Ingenieros, Alfredo Palacios and José Vasconcelos, to be taken as a model by the students’ organization that promoted the University Reform throughout Latin America. Unlike the situation in Cordoba, where the movement was basically antischolastic, La Plata's reformism was marked by a strong antipositivism because clericalism was almost completely inexistent in La Plata. This antipositivistic reaction was guided by Alejandro Korn. Between 1919 and 1922, he wrote several articles about the impact of the University Reform in the cultural renovation of Latin America.

His most remarkable work, La Libertad creadora (“The creative freedom”) was written as a request from the “Centro de Estudiantes”, a Buenos Aires Law Student's Association, to be published in their magazine Verbum, in order to give basis to the transforming activities in which the reformist youth was embarked upon. It was written under the concepts that inspired his vision of an “ethical socialism”. The former Guatemala president Juan José Arévalo, former pupil of Korn in National University of La Plata defined him as the professor par excellence.

Deputy Silvia Augsburger claimed that Korn was the main thinker of the University Reform, in what concerns new syllabuses and modern teaching methods. Those aspects had also an important role in the agitated public debates in which Korn participated. Ahead of his time, following educationalist concepts that would be universally acknowledged in the 1950s, he remarked the need of make the student, as an active and creative subject, the center of the educationalist process. In La Reforma Universitaria (1919), he wrote:

The Reform is a dynamic process, and its purpose is creating a new University spirit and giving the University back its lost prestige, being conscious of its mission and dignity. In order to attain so, the student’s participation in the University’s government is essential. They, and only they, represent the propulsion force, the efficient action, capable of moving inertia and avoid stagnation. Without them, nothing has been done, and nothing would have been done. The way in which they must intervene, that’s a secondary issue; the important thing is to make sure that they constitute such a power, that nothing will be done without it. We have announced the advent of an intense ethical and aesthetical culture, purely Argentine, noble because of its yearning of social justice; a culture meant to exceed, without harming Science, an intellectualist and utilitarianist age. It is pleasing to observe the youth looking for the light of new ideals through different paths. A free cathedra surrounded by free students, who own and are responsible for their acts, will contribute towards forging the national character in a better way than the wordy tutelage of those who never even had strength of character themselves.

=== Sportsman ===
Korn practiced sport, especially fencing, and helped spread it in Argentina, when it wasn't the popular activity it is today.

In 1891, with an economic, political and social crisis started in 1890 as background, he was elected President of Gimnasia y Esgrima La Plata, a title he held until 1894. His most remarkable work, together with other leaders, was getting the estate enclosed by the streets Nº 1 and Nº 47 in order to build there the first sport's field of the club.

=== Philosopher ===
Together with José Ingenieros, Alejandro Korn is considered to be the pioneer in Argentine philosophical thinking, and part of the foundational group of Latin American philosophy, together with Cuban Enrique José Varona, Mexican José Vasconcelos and Antonio Caso, Peruvian Alejandro Deústua, Uruguayan Carlos Vaz Ferreira, Brazilian Raimundo Farías Brito and Chilean Enrique Molina.

Alejandro Korn's thinking inspired a profound renovation of Latin American philosophy, under the principles of the continental University Reform democratizing movement, in a moment when Argentina was experiencing a clash in order to exceed the “oligarchic republic”, which was based on electoral fraud and “voto cantado” (“spoken vote”), and establish a democratic system that had respect for the general will as its core. The people who read his works were mainly young reformist students and left-center political and social activists. The central theme of his work was the study of values and freedom. Two notable works are La libertad creadora (1922) and Axiología (1930).

The crux of Alejandro Korn's philosophy is the criticism towards positivism and naïve realism, that is to say, the principles and conclusions, usually spontaneous, that are considered evident in each age, and which are present in every philosophical system, often as items from the rational analysis that are considered obvious.

Korn conceives philosophy as thought intimately related to the culture of the moment, and the moment itself, a reflexion that comes as a by-product of a praxis linked to the problems and will of the specific individuals and democratic communities.

=== The five wise men of the cultural beacon ===
La Plata was conceived in 1882 as a cultural excellence center, open to the world, and specially open to Latin America. From its notable urbanistic design to its university and its famous Natural Sciences Museum, all the way up to the city's historical theaters and its extensive students’, teachers’ and researchers’ communities, with people from several regions and countries, La Plata established itself as an educational and scientific center, often called one of the Latin American cultural beacons.

Korn was part of the core of that beacon, together with four other La Plata's citizens known as the five wise men: poet Almafuerte, paleontologist and anthropologist Florentino Ameghino, philosopher Alejandro Korn, biologist Carlos Luis Spegazzini and criminologist Juan Vucetich.

The five wise men were broadly the same sage: the two eldest ones, Ameghino and Almafuerte, were born in 1854, and the youngest, Korn himself, was born in 1860. Korn was, in addition, the last to die, in 1936; the first had been Ameghino in 1911.

== Works ==
=== The creative freedom (1920) ===
The Creative Freedom is a paper first published in 1920, by the Verbum magazine, by the Law Students Centre of the University of Buenos Aires. It was the time of the University Reform, started in 1918 in Córdoba and spread afterwards throughout Latin America, which sought the generalization of the Latin American university kind that was found under a principle of autonomy, and with student participation in its government, as well as cathedra freedom. Korn had a decisive role in the University Reform, as a protagonist (he was the first dean to be elected by the students), and also as a thinker of the movement. In that way, The creative freedom is a profound philosophical reflexion about freedom, that sought boosting the role of the common man and woman, the “free subject”, as Korn called it, in the voluntarily transformation of the world.

Eugenio Pucciarelli wrote in the prologue to The creative freedom that “freedom is experienced as a liberation, as an emancipation from servitude, as an overcoming of an obstacle, as a triumph over resistance”. Korn himself stated that “our freedom would plunge if it were not leaning on the resistance that opposes it”.

The dynamics of antinomies is a fundamental trait of Alejandro Korn's thought. With the same approaching method, Korn stated that justice itself doesn't exist, that there's only injustice and the constant fight against it towards the ideal of justice.

In order to understand the dynamics of freedom, Alejandro Korn started from the comprehension of “I” and the “subject” as active entities, bestowed with their own initiative.

The subject does not stand before the world in a contemplative attitude, he is not, in any way, a disinterested spectator. Consciousness is the theater for the conflicts and harmonies between the subject that feel, judges and wants, and the object that adjusts and resists.

Korn gave priority to the concept of present time over the concept of reality. Reality, defined from the idea of thing, tends to form a static and passive field, whereas present time, defined from the idea of act, tends to form dynamic processes, always changing and influenced by human decisions. From this theory, Korn outlined a criticism for language when he says:

A philosophy treatise, in order to be logical, should be written using verbs and not a single noun. We never use a verb without referring it to a noun or a pronoun that substitutes it. This way of using the language, suggested by the relative stagnancy of things, derives from naïve realism and leads us towards mistakes.

Korn approached the concept of creative freedom through the antinomy of the objective world and the subjective world. The objective world, he said, obeys necessary rules, whereas the subjective world has no rules, it's free.

Kant’s third antinomy states, in a concise way, the philosophical problem par excellence: the joint affirmation of necessity and freedom.

From this conflict between freedom and necessity emerges a permanent process of both scientific and technical development that seeks obtaining power over the objective world and ethical self-domain of the subjective world that seeks subjugating necessity to freedom, thus reaching freedom itself in its uttermost development, dynamically linking power and will (desire).

Freedom, thus understood, as an action, transformation and taking of an ethical position by an autonoumus subject, is referred to as creative freedom by Alejandro Korn

== Homage ==
The following items hold his name:

- The town he was born in, previously known as Empalme San Vicente, was named after him in 1964.
- The Melchor Romero Neuropsychiatry Hospital, that he directed in the period 1898–1916, was named Alejandro Korn in 1954.
- The Alejandro Korn's People's University, founded the year of his death, which has been active since then.
- A cátedra libre (“free cathedra”) in National University of La Plata, created in 1997 in order to spread his thoughts and analyze novelties in art, science and philosophy.
- A student's reformist association in National University of Rosario.

In La Plata, opposite the Natural Sciences Museum, there is a monument, called Monument to the Five Wise Men by sculptor Máximo Maldonado.

== List of works ==
- Socialismo ético (1918) Ethical socialism
- Inscript vita nova (1918)
- La Reforma Universitaria (1919) The university's Reform
- La libertad creadora (1920) The creative freedom
- Esquema gnoseológico (1924)
- El concepto de ciencia (1926) The concept of science
- Axiología (1930)
- Apuntes filosóficos (1935) Philosophical notes
- Influencias filosóficas en la evolución nacional (1936)
- Filósofos y sistemas (1936) Philosophers and systems
- Ensayos críticos (1936)
- Obras completas (1949)
- Juan Pérez (1963)
- Estudios de filosofía contemporánea (1963)
