= Pucciarelli (surname) =

Pucciarelli is an Italian surname. Notable people with the surname include:

- Eugenio Pucciarelli (1907–1995), Argentine essayist
- Héctor Mario Pucciarelli (1939–2018), Argentine anthropologist
- Manuel Pucciarelli (born 1991), Italian footballer
- Nicholas Pucciarelli (1923–1983), American politician
- Paulus Pucciarelli (1583–1631), Greek bishop
- Stefania Pucciarelli (born 1967), Italian politician

== See also ==
- Federico Pucciariello (born 1975), Argentine rugby union player
