= 2026 San Cristóbal school shooting =

School shooting in Santa Fe Province, Argentina

- Location: San Cristóbal, Santa Fe, Argentina
- Date: 30 March 2026 c. 7:15 a.m. – c. 7:25 a.m. (ART)
- Attack type: School shooting, mass shooting, pedicide
- Weapon: 12-gauge double-barreled shotgun
- Deaths: 1
- Injuries: 8 (2 by gunfire)
- Defender: Students
- Motive: Under investigation
- Accused: 15-year-old student

On 30 March 2026, a school shooting took place at Mariano Moreno high school in San Cristóbal, Santa Fe, Argentina. A 13-year-old was killed and eight others were injured before the suspect, a 15-year-old boy, was subdued and taken into custody. The shooting was the first major school shooting in Argentina since 2004.

== Background ==
The Escuela Normal Superior Nº40 "Mariano Moreno" is a public secondary school in San Cristóbal, a small city in north-west Santa Fe Province with a population of around 16,000. Months prior to the shooting in January, a group of classmates attacked and attempted to murder a 15-year-old girl. Three suspects aged 18, 17, and 16 were arrested.

Argentina rarely records school shootings. Civilian gun ownership is tightly regulated and firearms are not commonly carried by teenagers. Previous school shootings included the Rafael Calzada school shooting which killed one person in 2000 and the Carmen de Patagones school shooting that killed three in 2004, both in Buenos Aires Province.

== Shooting ==
The shooter arrived at the school at 7:01 a.m. and allegedly concealed a shotgun believed to be his grandfather's inside of his guitar case before entering the school. The shooting occurred at around 7:15 a.m. while students were waiting to raise the flag, as they do each day before classes begin. The gunman first went into the upstairs restroom, locking himself inside a toilet cubicle to assemble his gun. He then fired on several students in the restroom, injuring them. In the restroom's doorway, the gunman fired four more shots, killing a student who was running away. One witness said the shooter yelled "surprise!" before opening fire and seemed calm. The gunman reloaded his weapon and fired twice more at the courtyard below without hitting anyone. The school janitor then subdued the attacker. Several police vehicles and emergency personnel arrived at the scene ten minutes after the first call.

== Victims ==
13-year-old Ian Cabrera was killed and eight others were injured, including six non-gunshot victims. The six students, who sustained injuries from cut glass while breaking windows to escape, were treated at the local hospital while the two gunshot victims were transferred to the Rafaela Regional Hospital, including one in serious but stable condition.

== Suspect ==
The suspect was identified as a 15-year-old student at the school who lived in Entre Ríos Province. He had experience with long guns and used to go hunting in the area with his father. He did not have a previous criminal record but was undergoing psychological treatment after a history of self-harm and depression. Students, teachers and friends described him as a quiet but good kid with good grades and was not being bullied.

The shooting was not targeted at anyone. He was initially charged with aggravated murder involving the use of a firearm, but held not criminally responsible because of his age, he will likely be sent to a psychiatric facility. His father reportedly had substance abuse problems and his mother was on leave from work due to a psychiatric condition. He had shared videos of previous school shooters on social media, including Kosta Kecmanović, the perpetrator of the 2023 Belgrade school shooting that killed 10, Eric Harris and Dylan Klebold, the perpetrators of the Columbine High School massacre in 1999 that killed 14, Seung-Hui Cho, the perpetrator of the 2007 Virginia Tech shooting that killed 32, and Elliot Rodger, the perpetrator of the 2014 Isla Vista killings that killed six. He also posted a video on TikTok praising Japanese author and failed coup leader Yukio Mishima who killed himself in 1970, and set his profile picture as the The Anatomy Lesson of Dr. Nicolaes Tulp, a 1632 painting made by Rembrandt.

== Aftermath ==
Classes were suspended and students were dismissed. School activity was resumed on 15 April.

On 31 March, three students at a technical school were arrested for carrying two concealed knives and a hand axe in their backpacks. On 4 or 5 April, a 16-year-old boy was arrested in Sunchales for attempting to enter Alberdi School in Rafaela. A search of his person revealed an air rifle in his bag and online, he was found to have threatened a shooting at the school. A loaded revolver was found at the boy's home. On 5 April, a 15-year-old boy was reported by former classmates for threatening a shooting at Domingo Savio school in Aldo Bonzi. The boy had not attended since 2024 and posted audio messages containing death threats and images of firearms in a group chat for twenty days. A search of his phone found that he was in the same WhatsApp chat group as the perpetrator of the San Cristóbal shooting.

== Investigation ==
Authorities in Santa Fe Province launched an investigation into the shooting. The Anti-Terrorism Investigation Unit Department (DUIA) is also involved.

Santa Fe Investigative Police (PDI) seized the shotgun, ammunition, spent casings, a cartridge container, a cartridge belt with several cartridges, shotgun pellets, a backpack and a black jumpsuit from the scene. On 5 April, it was announced that the shooting was not an isolated incident with further investigations into the suspect's online activity. On 6 April, a 16-year-old boy was arrested on suspicions of having prior knowledge of the attack and charged with obstruction of justice.

On 8 April, National Security Minister Alejandra Monteoliva and Governor of Santa Fe Province Maximiliano Pullaro stated that psychosis and retaliation for bullying had been ruled out as motives. It is instead believed that the perpetrator had acted out of "veneration for violent crimes and murders", as he was involved in the True Crime Community (TCC), an online community suspected of encouraging violent crime out of an admiration for the Columbine High School shooting. Federal Police and the American Federal Bureau of Investigation were investigating the influence of the TCC in fifteen other criminal acts committed in Argentina since 2024. Both the suspected shooter and the boy charged with obstruction of justice were also linked to the incel subculture.
