= San Vicente Partido =

San Vicente Partido de San Vicente
- Department
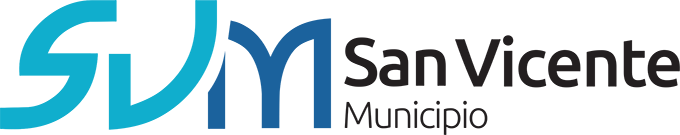

- location of San Vicente Partido in Buenos Aires Province
- Coordinates: 35°01′S 58°25′W
- Country: Argentina
- Established: October 24, 1864
- Founder: provincial law 422
- Seat: San Vicente

Government
  - Intendant: Nicolás Mantegazza (Union for the Homeland)

Area
  - Total: 666 km^{2} (257 sq mi)

Population
  - Total: 44,529
  - Density: 66.9/km^{2} (173/sq mi)
- Demonym: sanvicentina/o
- Postal Code: B1865
- IFAM: BUE119
- Area Code: 50222
- Patron saint: ?
- Website: www.websanvicente.com.ar

San Vicente Partido is a partido in the centre-east of Buenos Aires Province in Argentina.

The provincial subdivision has a population of about 45,000 inhabitants in an area of 666 km^{2} (257 sq mi), and its capital city is San Vicente, which is around 52 km (32 mi) from Buenos Aires.

== Settlements ==
- Alejandro Korn
- Domselaar
- San Vicente

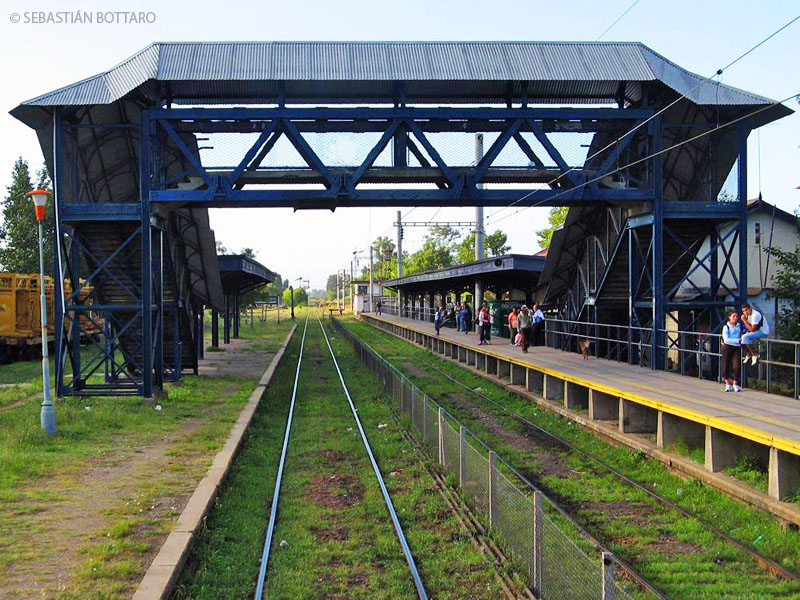
Alejandro Korn railway station.
