= Domselaar =

- Location in Buenos Aires Province Domselaar (Argentina)
- Coordinates: 35°04′S 58°17′W
- Country: Argentina
- Province: Buenos Aires
- Partido: San Vicente
- Elevation: 17 m (56 ft)

Population (2001 census [INDEC])
  - Total: 1,711
- CPA Base: B 1984
- Area code: +54 2225

Domselaar is a town in the Buenos Aires Province, Argentina, located in San Vicente Partido. It is located very close to the edge of the Greater Buenos Aires urban conurbation, but has not yet been agglomerated.

== History ==
The area that today includes Domselaar was crossed by several paths that led to the so-called Tablada Vieja, where cattle were concentrated for inspection and later remission to the riachuelo salting sheds. These difficulties were overcome thanks to the arrival of the General Roca Railway in 1865 from the hands of the British company Buenos Aires Great Southern Railway, whose objective was to facilitate the transport of wool production from Chascomús towards the market of the Plaza Constitución.

The foundation of the station took place on August 14, 1865, the date that is considered the foundation of Domselaar, since from then on its population gradually increased. As occurred throughout the province of Buenos Aires, most of the towns were created in the vicinity of the railway lines. During the 1990s, under a progressive process of dismantling the state railway network, the service has ceased to stop in these towns, leading many of them to ruin. Domselaar is one of the few towns to have survived and prospered after its station was closed in 1994.

The station got its name from Antonio van Domselaar, a medical doctor in Woudenberg, Utrecht, Netherlands. He and his wife Maria van der Berg immigrated in 1832 with their 4 children: Matteo Van Domselaar, Thomas Domselaar, Yeila Domselaar and Manuel Domselaar, to Argentina where Antonio bought a large ranch of over 2000 acres about 40 kms. south of Buenos Aires. When he was asked to sell part of his property for extension of a railway line, he offered to give the land on condition that the railway station (later a town) called “Domselaar”.

During the first years of the 21st century, several projects related to the reactivation of the railway were carried out, since the majority of the population works in the city of Buenos Aires or in the southern area of Greater Buenos Aires. The nearest station is Alejandro Korn, which is 15 kilometers away. Until then, the means of access to the Federal Capital and the southern area were through bus line 388, which connects the town of Coronel Brandsen with the town of Alejandro Korn, passing through Domselaar.

As of October 4, 2019, the Alejandro Korn-Chascomús rail service stopped at Domselaar again. Trenes Argentinos reported that the first service to stop at the new stop was at 12:13 tomorrow, Friday, October 4, bound for Chascomús.
