= San Vicente, Buenos Aires =

San Vicente
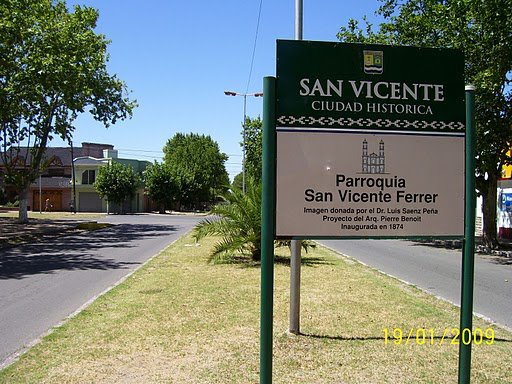

- Location in Buenos Aires Province
- Coordinates: 35°1′S 58°25′W
- Country: Argentina
- Province: Buenos Aires
- Partido: San Vicente
- Founded: 1784
- Elevation: 25 m (82 ft)

Population (2001 census [INDEC])
  - Total: 21,411
- CPA Base: B 1865
- Area code: +54 2225
- Website: Gobierno Municipal San Vicente

San Vicente is a town and administrative centre of San Vicente Partido, in the province of Buenos Aires, Argentina. The southernmost town in the Greater Buenos Aires metropolitan area, San Vicente is 48 km (30 mi) from downtown Buenos Aires, and can be accessed from Constitución Station by bus via Line 79 or a 20-minute drive by Provincial Route 58 from Ezeiza International Airport. The city has about 21,000 inhabitants per the 2001 census [INDEC].

== History ==
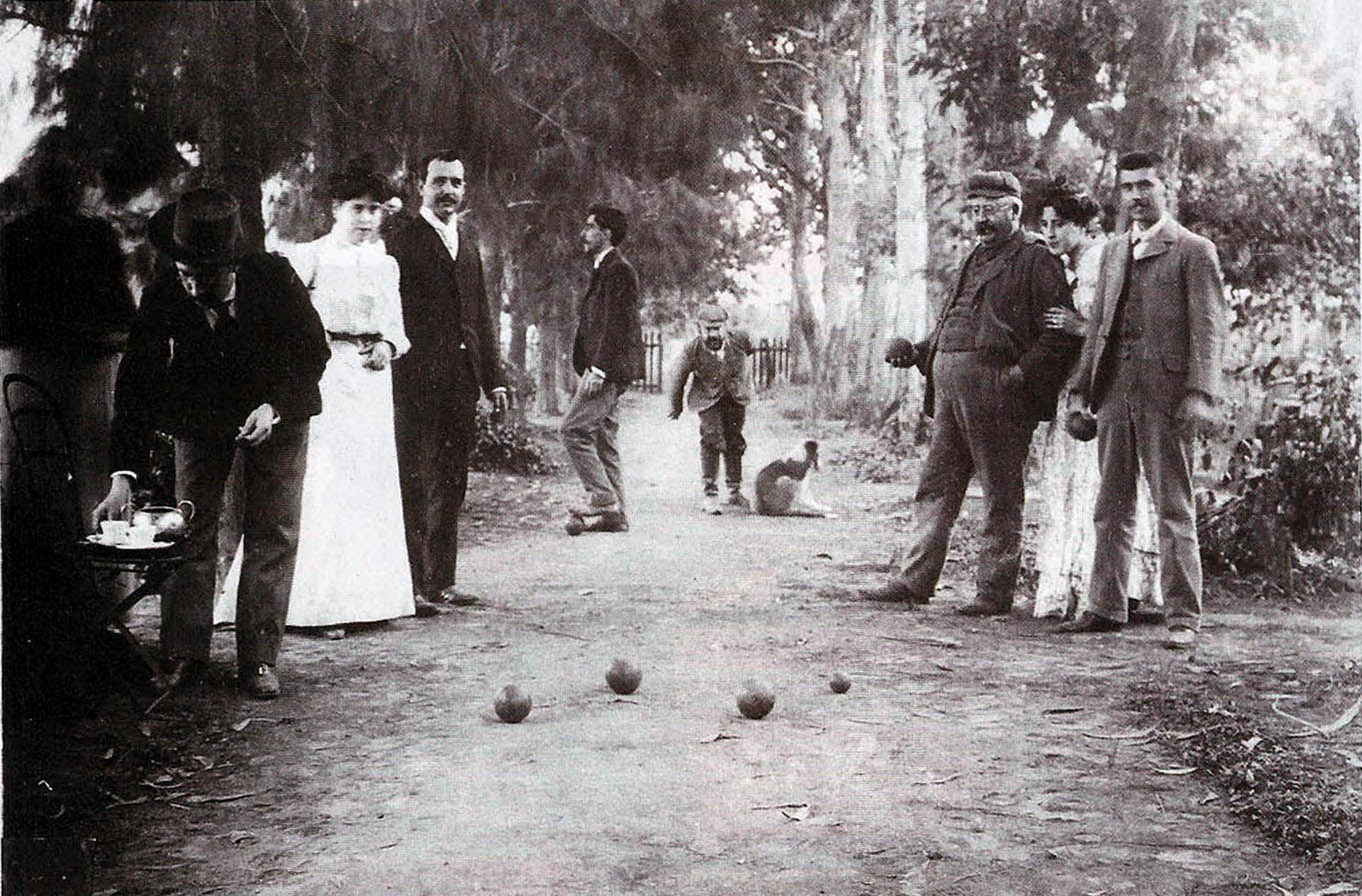
Family playing bocce in San Vicente, c. 1902

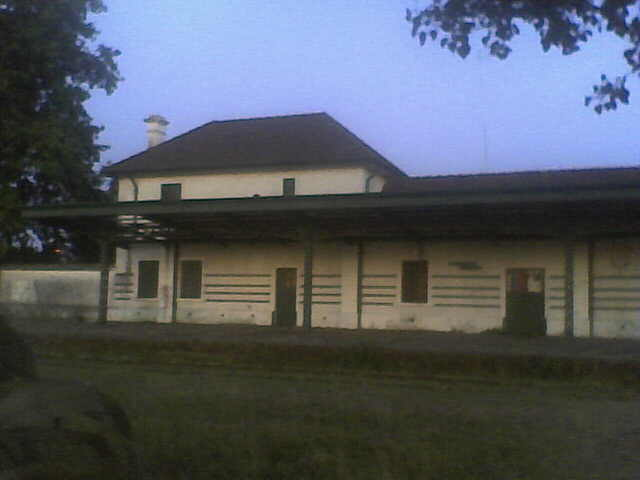
The General Roca Line station in San Vicente operated between 1928 and 1978

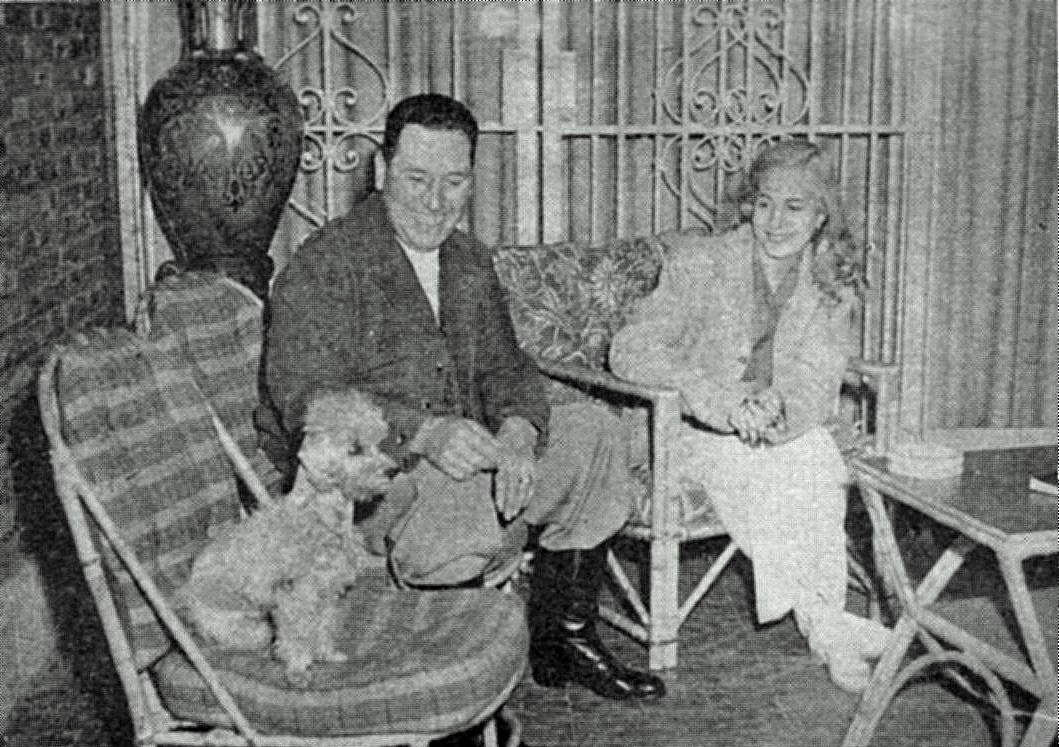
Arguably the town's best-known residents, Evita and Juan Perón relax in their San Vicente ranch in 1950

Named in honor of the 14th century Dominican friar Saint Vincent Ferrer, the site was first settled as an Indian Reduction in 1618 by Spanish conquistadores and was initially known as Laguna de la Reducción. Luis Pessoa y Figueroa, a landowner from Magdalena and member of the Buenos Aires Cabildo, bought much of the land south of the San Vicente Lagoon (then known as Laguna del Ojo) in 1696, and his son, Juan Bautista Pessoa, established a small settlement in 1734. A fort, Fortín El Zajón, was built here by the Blandengues cavalry corps in 1750. Luis Pessoa's grandson, Friar Vicente Pessoa, established the area's first Catholic parish in 1781 and on 30 December 1784, the county of Magdalena was formally divided into among two other towns, San Vicente.

The village was made a county seat by the establishment of one of the province's first Justice of the Peace courts in 1822. Governor Juan José Viamonte founded the area's first large estancia, La Martiniana, in 1824, and the subsequent establishment of numerous English Argentine settlers made San Vicente the provincial capital of sheep farming by 1854, with over 558,000 head. Recurrent flooding from surrounding swampland led provincial authorities to propose relocating the town. Local residents rejected the proposal, however, and on 27 January 1856, the Municipality of San Vicente was formally established.

The town grew slowly but steadily, and in 1896 a tram service was inaugurated. This era of growth was interrupted by World War I and the coinciding collapse of the wool market; but the inaugural in 1928 of a Buenos Aires Great Southern Railway rail link to Buenos Aires brought renewed growth to San Vicente. The Ramón Carrillo Hospital, the town's first, was inaugurated in 1949. The local rail station was closed amid budget cuts in 1978. San Vicente is also slated to house the National Cattle Ranchers' Market, although the 2001 Buenos Aires municipal ordinance mandating its relocation from the Mataderos borough to San Vicente has been repeatedly postponed due to cattle vendor objections to the cost of relocation.

San Vicente became a bedroom community in later decades of the 20th century, and numerous well-known figures in Argentine sports, history, and culture have resided there. These included Emilie Schindler; writer Rodolfo Walsh; comics artist Dante Quinterno; former Argentina national football team captain Jorge Brown; psychiatrist and activist Dr. Alejandro Korn (after whom a neighboring town is named); and arguably the town's most famous residents, populist leaders Evita and Juan Perón, who purchased a weekend home in San Vicente in 1947. This is today the site of the 17 de Octubre Museum, to which Juan Perón's remains were relocated from La Chacarita Cemetery (Buenos Aires) on 17 October 2006. Other local attractions include the San Vicente Lagoon and campgrounds, the Parish of St. Vincent Ferrer, Mariano Moreno Square, and the San Vicente Cultural Museum.
