= Giovi Novello =

Argentine musician

Giovi Novello (b, 1994) is an Argentine musician from the punk rock band Vomitan Glitter, an LGBT activist, and coordinator of the Association of Trans and Non-Binary Men of Santa Fe.

== Biography ==
Giovi was born in the city of Santa Fe in 1994. From an early age, he felt a deep connection to music, starting to play guitar and exploring other instruments throughout his life. His passion for punk rock was rooted in his innate sense of justice and desire to address injustices through music.

However, while music became a form of expression for Giovi early on, his identity as a trans man was something he kept hidden for a long time. He believed he would have to live a life of pretending, hiding his true self. During the COVID-19 pandemic, he was forced to confront his deepest thoughts and feelings and eventually decided it was time to be authentic and begin his gender transition.

== Career ==
His relationship with music began when he was just a child, and at six years old, he convinced his father to buy him his first classical guitar, even though music store clerks doubted his small hands. Since then, Giovi explored various musical influences, but it was punk rock that truly captivated him for its energy, protest, and constant rebellion.

At age 12, Giovi began his music career in the band Censorshit in 2006, a journey that lasted sixteen years and resulted in three albums. However, with the beginning of his gender transition, he felt the need to close that chapter and embark on a new stage.

At the beginning of the COVID-19 pandemic in 2020, Giovi founded Vomitan Glitter, together with Julia Pagnutti and Mely Dvylle, a band he defines as dissident punk rock, where he is the singer and guitarist. The project was born from a personal need to express his experiences during his transition process and became a platform to give visibility to trans people in music.

== Activism ==
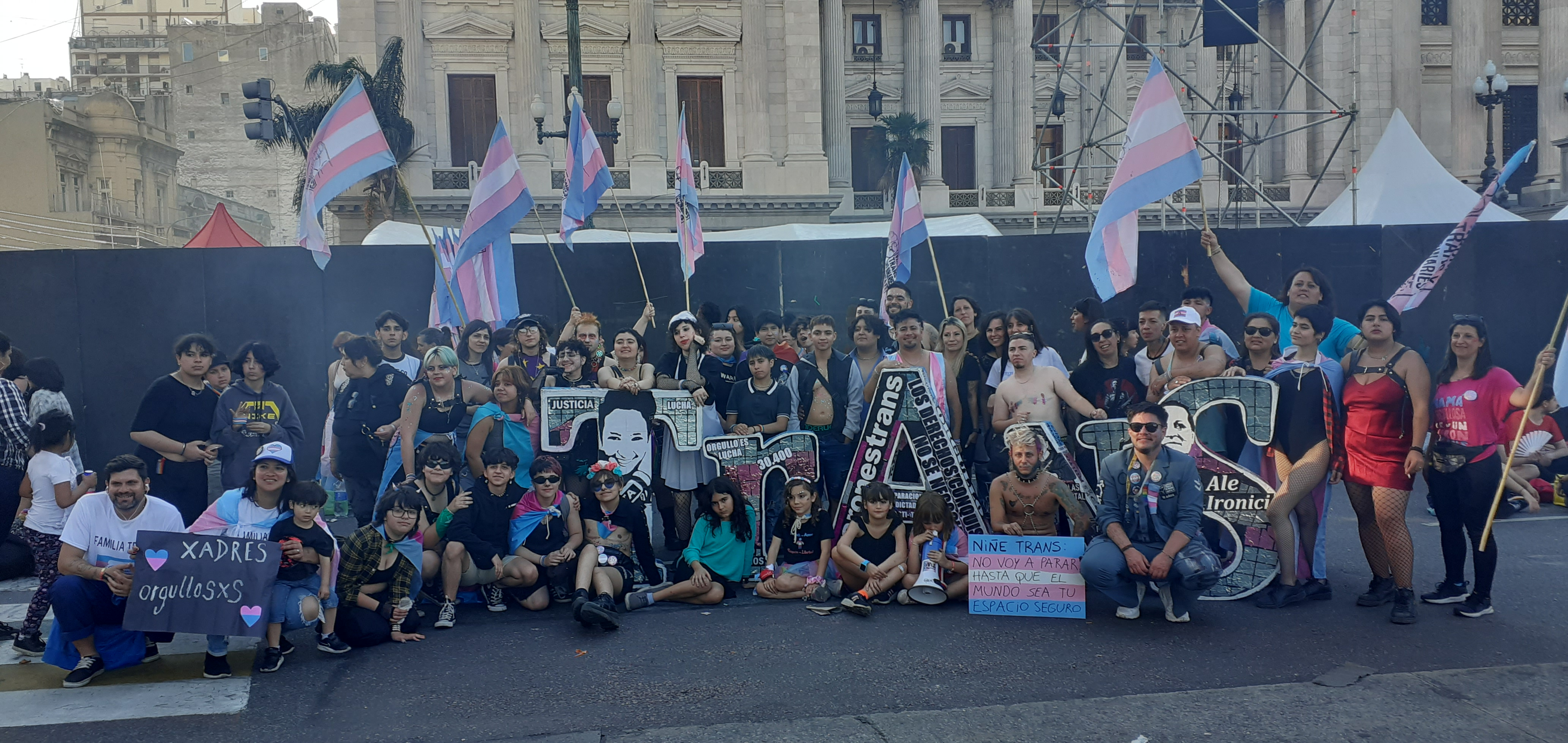
Association of Trans and Non-Binary Men of Santa Fe at the 2023 Pride March in Buenos Aires

His activism began in 2019 when he joined the Association of Trans Men. The following year, he founded the Civil Association of Trans and Non-Binary Men of Santa Fe, a space dedicated to supporting trans men, trans children, and their families, playing a key role in accompanying trans children's transitions in Santa Fe and other areas of Argentina.

The intersection between his trans activism and artistic life is significant in Giovi's career. His songs, written in the first person using masculine pronouns, have become a powerful way to address gender identity and sexual diversity. Through music and activism, he seeks to change the negative perception that often surrounds trans people in society.

Giovi also stands out as coordinator of the Civil Association of Trans and Non-Binary Men of Santa Fe, where he works on promoting rights and providing support for trans people, especially youth and their families. His work focuses on providing a safe and supportive space for trans people and advocating for public policies that address the community's needs. He also has support from the Trans Memory Archive to promote visibility and document the history of transmasculinities.

In 2021, he helped organize the Transpalooza festival alongside the trans men's association. This festival was entirely composed of trans people, marking a milestone in the city.

Together with the group Xadres and the trans men and families association, he produced a documentary titled *"Trans Childhoods and Their Families."* This film shares the life experiences of trans children and families from his organization, and in 2021, it was screened at the Argentine Chamber of Deputies to mark the 10th anniversary of the Gender Identity Law (Argentina).

He is also the author of ordinance 12.814, the first ordinance establishing a comprehensive approach to trans childhoods in Argentina, and ordinance 12.880, which created the Municipal Day of Trans and Non-Binary Childhoods (celebrated on the last Saturday of August to coincide with other festivities during Children's Month); both are significant achievements for the recognition of trans children's rights. He also played an important role in designing and launching a mental health program for trans children in coordination with the Municipality of Santa Fe, providing free services since 2023.

== Publications ==
- 2024: El secreto más profundo. ISBN 9789504983569
