= Eugenio Pucciarelli =

Argentine writer (1907–1995)

Eugenio Pucciarelli (August 28, 1907 – January 3, 1995) was an Argentine essayist. He received a doctorate in philosophy in 1937, and worked as a teacher at the universities of Tucumán, La Plata and Buenos Aires. He was declared professor Emeritus of the UBA. He was the president of the National Academy of Sciences of Buenos Aires.
