= Melchor Romero =

- Town
- Location within Argentina
- Coordinates: 34°56′57″S 58°2′50″W
- Country: Argentina
- Province: Buenos Aires
- Partido: La Plata
- Elevation: 25 m (82 ft)

Population (2001 Census)
  - Total: 22,511
- Time zone: UTC−3 (ART)
- CPA Base: B 1903
- Climate: Dfc

Melchor Romero is a town in Argentina, located in the La Plata Partido of Buenos Aires Province.
