= Alejandro Korn, Buenos Aires =

City in Buenos Aires Province, Argentina

Alejandro Korn
- City
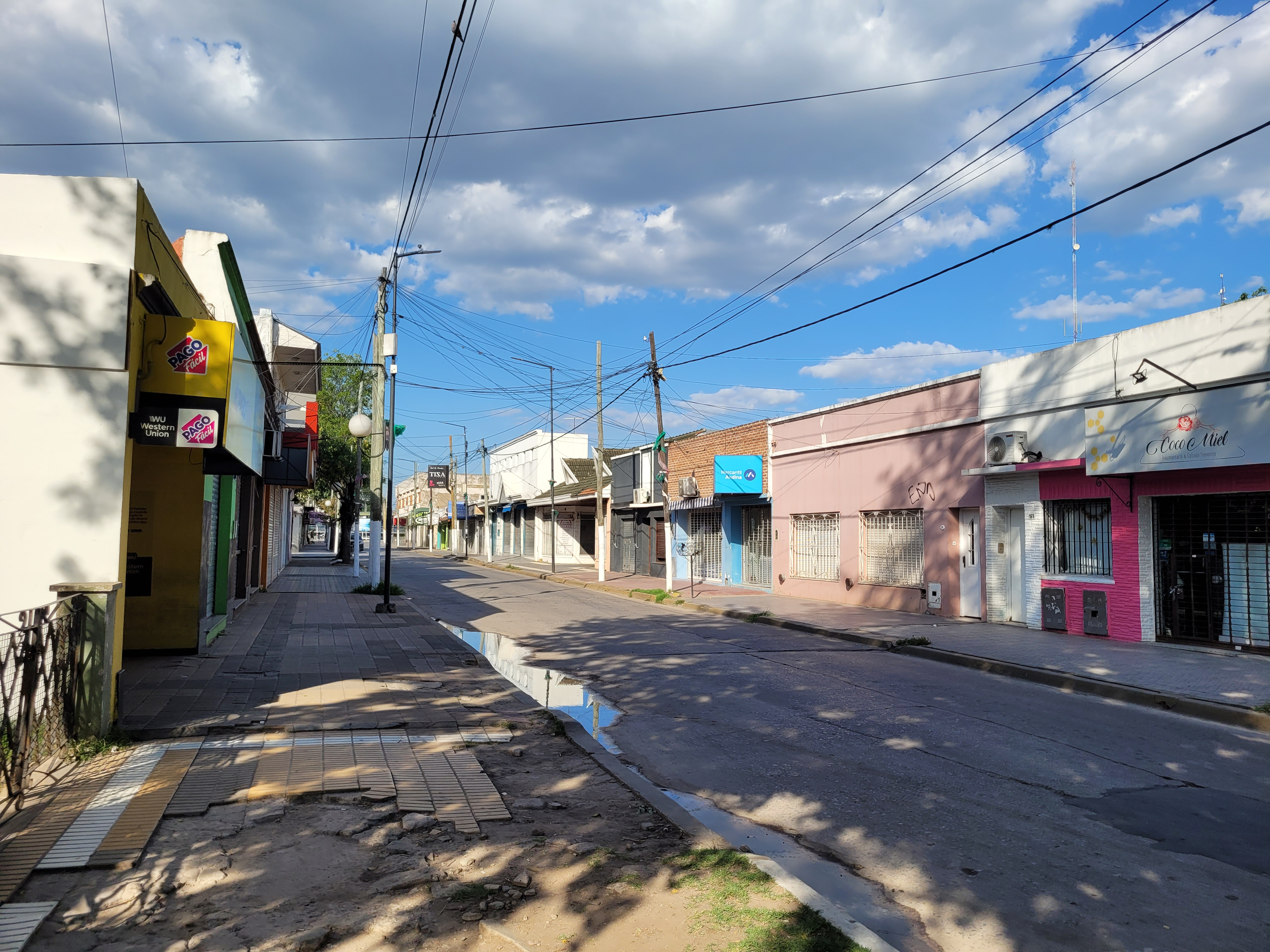

- Location in Greater Buenos Aires Alejandro Korn (Argentina)
- Coordinates: 34°58′S 58°22′W
- Country: Argentina
- Province: Buenos Aires
- Partido: San Vicente
- Founded: August 14, 1865
- Elevation: 22 m (72 ft)

Population (2001 census [INDEC])
  - Total: 21,407
- CPA Base: B 1864
- Area code: +54 2225

Alejandro Korn, is a city in the Buenos Aires Province, Argentina, located in the San Vicente Partido.

The settlement was founded on August 14, 1865, and renamed in honour of Alejandro Korn (1860 — 1935), an Argentine psychiatrist, philosopher, and reformist.
