= Rafael Calzada school shooting =

2000 shooting in Rafael Calzada, Argentina

- Location: Secondary School No. 9, Rafael Calzada, Buenos Aires, Argentina
- Date: 4 August 2000; 26 years ago
- Attack type: School shooting
- Weapon: .22 Short Bagual snubnosed revolver
- Deaths: 1
- Injuries: 1
- Perpetrator: Javier Ignacio Romero
- Motive: Retaliation for bullying
- Charges: Simple homicide; Attempted simple homicide
- Verdict: Not guilty by reason of insanity

On 4 August 2000, 19-year-old Javier Romero opened fire at Secondary School No. 9, located in Rafael Calzada, Buenos Aires, killing one student and injuring another, as retaliation for the frequent bullying which he suffered. After years of psychiatric evaluations, he was declared not guilty by reason of insanity in 2003 and was interned for a further 15 years before being released.

The incident has since been recognized as one the first fatal school shootings in Latin America.

== Background ==
The first documented case of a school shooting in Argentina occurred in May 1997, when 14-year-old Leonardo Aguirre stole his father's Argentine National Gendarmerie service weapon and shot his classmate, Cristian Fernández, to death. The perpetrator was not persecuted due to his young age falling under the Argentine age of criminal responsibility of 16.

=== Perpetrator ===
Javier Ignacio Romero was the youngest of four siblings born to Bernardino Romero and Luisa Gómez. His father died in July 1983 from a hepatic disease, when Romero was just two years old. A student at Secondary School No. 9, he frequently suffered bullying, with classmates often calling him "Pantriste" (lit. Sadbread) in reference to the titular character of the 2000 animated Argentine film Heart, the joys of Pantriste, which had just been released the previous summer.

== Events ==
On 4 August 2000, after classes had ended for the day, Romero was leaving the school when a student yelled out "Hey, Pantriste!" from outside. Romero then took a .22 short Bagual snubnosed revolver (which reportedly was legally owned by his mother as a means of self-defense) from his backpack, held the weapon in both hands, and opened fire at the school entrance gate three times. The first bullet missed completely, the second one grazed the ear of 18-year-old Gabriel Alfredo Ferrari, and the third one landed in the skull of 16-year-old Mauricio Ariel Salvador. Both victims had gone to the same class as Romero. During the shooting, he reportedly yelled "Now you will respect me! I'm going to fuck you up!".

Romero fled the scene and ran back to his older sister's apartment, where he was staying during the weekdays due to its proximity to the school. He ate lunch with her before going to sleep. Five hours later, his mother showed up with a police squad, who arrested him.

The wounded were interned to Fiorito Hospital, where Salvador died three days later. Ferrari was let go that same day.

== Aftermath ==
After the incident, the perpetrator expressed his apologies to the victims' families. The case brought national attention to the subject of bullying and how schools should deal with it.

The legal case was presided by Judge Lomas de Zamora Marisa Salvo. According to psychological evaluations, he suffered from schizoid personality disorder and experienced a brief psychotic episode, thus rending him innocent by reason of insanity on 8 April 2003. Despite this, he was still considered a danger to society and was as such interned in four different prisons along with one psychiatric hospital before being finally discharged in 2018.

Five years after the events, Argentina was subject to the Carmen de Patagones school shooting, which killed 3 students and injured another 5. It remains as the deadliest school shooting in Argentina.

After the shooting, two of Romero's classmates (including Ferrari) dropped out of high school.
