= San Cristóbal, Santa Fe =

San Cristóbal
- City
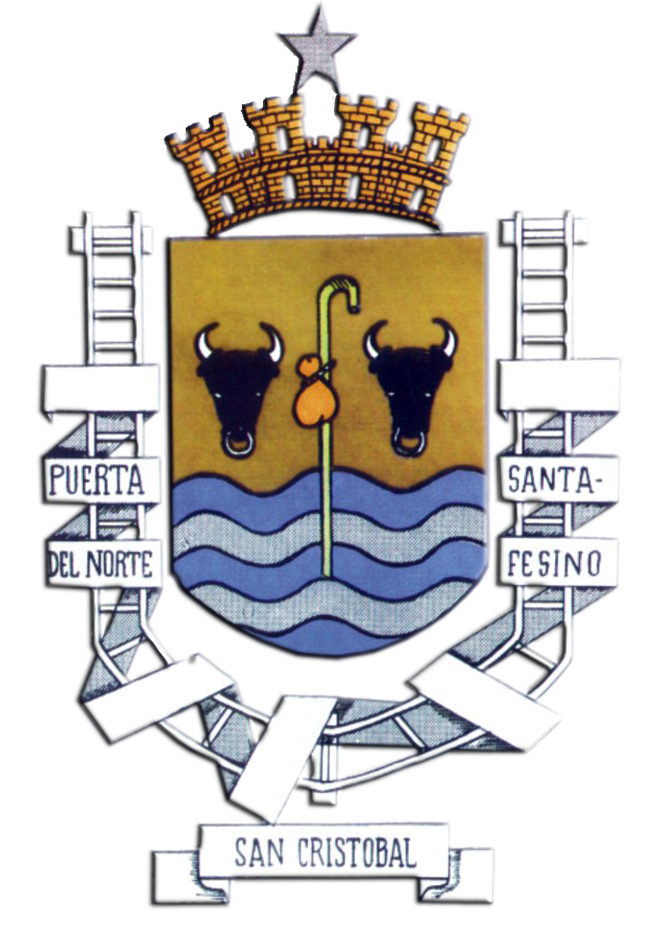
- Flag Coat of arms

- Location of San Cristóbal in Argentina
- Coordinates: 30°19′S 61°14′W
- Country: Argentina
- Province: Santa Fe
- Department: San Cristóbal

Government
  - Intendant: Marcelo Raúl Andreychuk (PJ)

Area
  - Total: 652 km^{2} (252 sq mi)
- Elevation: 67 m (220 ft)

Population (2010 census)
  - Total: 14,389
  - Density: 22.1/km^{2} (57.2/sq mi)
- Time zone: UTC−3 (ART)
- CPA base: S3070
- Dialing code: +54 3408

San Cristóbal is a city in the center-north of the province of Santa Fe, Argentina, 179 km north-northwest from the provincial capital. It had about 14,000 inhabitants at the 2010 census [INDEC] and it is the head town of the San Cristóbal Department.

The town was founded in 1890 and the attained the status of comuna (commune) on 1894-01-21. It became a city on 1959-03-01.
