= List of school attacks in Brazil =

This is a chronological list of shootings, stabbings, and similar attacks in Brazil that have occurred at K–12 public and private schools, as well as at colleges and universities. Excluded from this list are incidents that solely occurred as a result of police actions, organized crime disputes, and suicides or suicide attempts involving only one person.

== List ==
Date	Location	Perpetrator(s)	Dead	Injured	Total	Description
7 October 1971	Cabo de Santo Agostinho	Severino Matos de Vasconselhos	1	1	2	Two students were shot in the classroom by a classmate; one of them died instantly and the other was seriously injured.
16 December 1972	Juiz de Fora	Nilson Resende	1	2 (Note: Including the perpetrator.)	3	A man armed with a revolver shot two students in front of a school with shots to the head, including a student who died from two shots to the head. The man later shot himself in the head.
5 September 1979	São Paulo	Dan Martin Blun	1	0	1	A University of São Paulo student murdered prostitute Maria Regina Rezende on campus by poisoning her before setting her body on fire.
20 September 1986	São Gonçalo	C.	0	3	3	A young man identified as C., detonated a homemade bomb in the gym of a school, injuring three students between the ages of 14 and 15, no one was seriously injured.
18 May 1993	São Paulo	Mauro Carvalho Mota	0	2	2	A 25-year-old man shot and wounded his ex-girlfriend and her boyfriend at the University of São Paulo.
27 July 1994	Brasília	Ricardo de Brito Rocha	1	1	2	A 40-year-old psychologist got into a fight with a student before he left the university and returned with a gun, injuring the student. The student fled to a classroom before the psychologist chased him and fired more shots, hitting a 19-year-old freshman in the eye, killing him.
11 December 1995	São Paulo	Christian Hartmann	2	1	3	Christian Hartmann, A 21-year-old man, shot and killed his ex-girlfriend Renata Alves and injured her boyfriend Winston Goldoni in a computer lab in one of the buildings at a Polytechnic School in São Paulo before taking his own life.
1 April 1996	Lorena	Antônio Carlos da Costa	1	1	2	Antônio Carlos da Costa, a 29-year-old student, shot a teacher and principal, Miguel Renato Martins, 44, killing him and injuring the college secretary, before escaping the scene.
12 August 1996	São Paulo	Unnamed	0	3	3	Multiple shooters invaded a school courtyard and wounded three people.
26 September 1996	Osasco	R. A. P.	0	1	1	An 18-year-old student known for his violent demeanor shot a 19-year-old classmate in the head, blinding her.
31 October 1996	Americana	Francisco Carlos Manuel de Jesus; Gilson Baldo	2	1	3	A man chased his ex-wife into a schoolyard and shot and killed her and wounded her sister. The victim's current husband fired back and killed the shooter.
26 November 1996	São Paulo	Unnamed	1	0	1	19-year-old Vagner Martins da Silva was shot in the head and rendered brain dead after a group of boys outside a school fired a shot into a classroom.
17 September 1997	Ribeirão Preto	L. R. D.	0	1	1	After being suspended from school, a 16-year-old student took a revolver from home and fired it at the school director, grazing a student bystander.
24 November 1997	Taboão da Serra	Rodolfo Eduardo Kersul	1 (Note: Only the perpetrator.)	1	2	During a discussion at the Escola de 1° e 2° Graus Alípio de Oliveira e Silva the shooter jumped over the wall of the school and attacked students in the courtyard of the institution. One friend of the shooter, Maurício Davi Masahraya Vardejo, tried to take his gun he ended up shooting himself in the abdomen. Kersul fatally shot himself in the head after.
30 April 1998	Iguatu	Gilcimar Bianchi	1	1	2	A man carrying a gun hijacked a school bus and ordered everyone to exit the bus except for his ex-girlfriend Ivete Lopes dos Santos. After a two-hour standoff with police, Bianchi shot her in the head, wounding her, before fatally shooting himself.
19 April 1999	Ribeirão Preto	N. A. S.	1	1	2	During an argument, a 13-year-old boy shot towards the interior of a school in Ribeirão Preto, killing a 17-year-old student and injuring a 14-year-old classmate in the foot. The boy fled but was detained.
29 April 1999	Guarulhos	Wellington Ferreira Mendes	1	0	1	As students gambled during a night class, a 22-year-old man opened fire, killing 18-year-old Élcio Clêmio de Souza.
13 May 1999	São Paulo	V. L. L.	0	1	1	A 17-year-old student attacked a 15-year-old classmate with an iron pipe, hitting him in the face, before fleeing the school.
6 October 1999	Campinas	Cléber Teixeira, Edmilson Fagundes de Souza Santos, two unnamed	3	7	10	Campinas school shooting: Four armed men invaded Escola Estadual de Primeiro Grau Núcleo Habitacional Vida Nova and shot nine students and beat a tenth, killing three of them, before fleeing.
25 February 2000	São Paulo	Unnamed	1	3	4	Two young men shot three students and a worker in front of a school, killing one of the students.
27 October 2000	Sumaré	F.P.	0	1	1	A 17-year-old shot a classmate in a classroom during a dispute over a girlfriend.
6 March 2001	Limeira	R. H. E. S.	1	3	4	A 16-year-old teenager shot four students, killing one of them at a school in Limeira.
6 August 2001	Macaúbas	Robério Souza de Oliveira	1	7	8	A farmer shot six students and a teacher with a shotgun at a school in Macaúbas, after the shooting the perpetrator fled and committed suicide.
27 March 2002	Foz do Iguaçu	Pedro da Silva Prusch	1	2	3	A 51-year-old mechanic stormed a school bus and shot three students aged 12, 14 and 15, killing a 15-year-old boy and wounding two others, before escaping.
11 May 2002	Cascavel	J. O.	0	3	3	A 16-year-old shot three students in a fight outside a Cascavel school, leaving one in critical condition. The young man and two others were arrested in connection with the crime.
28 October 2002	Jaguaribe	E. R.	2	0	2	Sigma School shooting: A student shot dead two of his classmates for bullying him.
28 January 2003	Taiúva	Edimar Aparecido Freitas	1	8	9	Taiúva school shooting: A former student shot and wounded 8 of his classmates before committing suicide.
18 February 2003	Belo Horizonte	W. P.	1	3	4	A gang fight at a school led to W. P. shooting three students. A 17-year-old student died days later after being shot several times, and two other female students were wounded in the legs and feet. W. P. was also shot by gunmen who stormed the school.
7 April 2003	Feira de Santana	Anilda Marques	0	3	3	A 19-year-old student stabbed three classmates at a school in Feira de Santana, the first mass stabbing and attack by a woman in Brazil.
20 May 2003	Francisco Morato	Unnamed	1	1	2	An unidentified gunman invaded a school and shot two students, killing one of them, before fleeing.
4 February 2004	Remanso	D.R.S.	2	3	5	A 17-year-old shot and killed a 13-year-old student who had previously ridiculed him, and then forced a taxi driver to take him to a nearby school. There, he shot and killed a 23-year-old and wounded two others before being subdued by students. A woman, afraid of getting shot, jumped out of a window in the third floor and broke her legs.
19 August 2005	Contagem	Unnamed	1	2	3	A man in his 30s shot three students near the school entrance, killing a 14-year-old student and wounding his brother and another classmate, before the man fled the scene and stole a truck to escape.
3 December 2007	Betim	Wharley Borges Costa	1	1	2	A 23-year-old man shot two 16-year-old girls after they had a fight with his wife, one of whom died on the way to hospital. The man jumped over the school fence and fled.
17 December 2009	Piracicaba	José Maria Roque	2	0	2	A 55-year-old civil servant broke into a school and shot dead a teacher of the same age at the Piracicaba school before killing himself.
6 October 2010	São Paulo, São Paulo (state)	Reginaldo Silva	2	0	2	38-year-old Reginaldo Silva fatally shot his ex-wife and then fatally shot himself at a school.
4 November 2010	Araucária	Unnamed	1	1	2	A 19-year-old entered a school gym to impress the students. When he tried to shoot into the air, the gun misfired before the young man shot at the students, hitting two students, one of whom died the next day.
23 March 2011	Gália	P. G. C.	0	2	2	A 31-year-old woman attacked two students with a knife after they had fought with her daughter.
7 April 2011	Realengo	Wellington Menezes de Oliveira	13	22	35	Rio de Janeiro school shooting: A former student shot dead 12 people and wounded another 22 before being shot by police, at which point he committed suicide.
19 May 2011	Betim	Unnamed	1	2	3	A 16-year-old shot three students as they were leaving school, killing one of the 18-year-old students and injuring two others. The young man was arrested and tried to hide the firearm by throwing it into a river.
21 June 2011	Fortaleza	Unnamed	1	2	3	A 17-year-old student stabbed two twin classmates in the chest and head, killing one of them, before slightly injuring herself with the knife she used in the crime.
17 August 2011	Juiz de Fora	Unnamed	0	3	3	A 15-year-old student attacked a 16-year-old classmate with an iron bar, before the classmate stabbed her with a knife. A teacher was also injured when he tried to contain the situation.
22 September 2011	São Caetano do Sul	Davi Mota Nogueira	1	1	2	São Caetano do Sul school shooting: A 10-year-old student entered a room using a firearm and shot a teacher, before leaving the room and committing suicide.
11 April 2012	João Pessoa	Unnamed	0	3	3	A student shot at people at a state school in João Pessoa, slightly injuring three students.
1 June 2012	Caxias do Sul	Unnamed	1	1	2	A 24-year-old man shot two students in front of a school, killing one of them. He was arrested days after the shooting.
11 September 2012	Dois Vizinhos	Unnamed	0	2	2	A teacher and a student were shot by a man who is the teacher's ex-boyfriend; he fled to Santa Catarina after the attack.
26 October 2012	Belo Horizonte	Adiel Alves	1	1	2	Adiel Alves, a 21-year-old man, invaded a university and shot and injured a security guard in the arm before Alves was killed.
10 May 2013	Vespasiano	Unnamed	1	2	3	A 16-year-old shot three students in front of a school in Vespasiano, killing a 16-year-old student with a shot to the head.
13 May 2013	Barcarena	Unnamed	0	3	3	A 15-year-old student shot three classmates in front of a school in Barcarena.
4 July 2013	Belo Horizonte	Alexandre Esteves dos Santos	0	2	2	A 19-year-old man shot two students at a school in Belo Horizonte.
11 September 2013	Campo Grande	Unnamed	1	1	2	A fight over perfume caused a 16-year-old student to fatally strike a 15-year-old classmate, and a third student who tried to protect the fatal victim was stabbed in the leg.
7 October 2013	José da Penha	José Marcos Alves	2	0	2	A man broke into a school and shot a 16-year-old student to death before committing suicide.
26 May 2014	Passo Fundo	Fabiano Cardozo Machado	1	1	2	A school fight led to a 26-year-old student stabbing a classmate, who died days later, before escaping and beating a woman he believed to be a university student.
22 July 2014	Ituiutaba	Igor Henrique da Silva	1	2	3	A 17-year-old boy broke into the school of his 13-year-old ex-girlfriend before going to the playground and holding her hostage with a knife. During 40 minutes of negotiations, when the police arrived, the young man wounded his ex-girlfriend in the neck and a police officer in the hand before being fatally shot in the head.
13 December 2014	Ladainha	José Geraldo Rodrigues	1	1	2	A 25-year-old man broke into a school in Ladainha and shot a teacher who is his ex-girlfriend before killing himself with a shot to the head.
23 May 2016	Manaus	Hoiran Kassio Vasconcelos Bentes Erick Andrade Vidal Ivanilson Souza dos Santos Figueiras	0	4	4	Four robbers broke into a school and robbed the students in a classroom. They refused to give them their belongings, which led one of them to stab three students. A security guard was beaten by the criminals who fled after the crime.
16 September 2016	Belo Horizonte	Odete Alves de Oliveira	0	2	2	A 55-year-old woman with mental problems broke into a daycare and injured a couple of siblings with a knife before being arrested.
2 December 2016	Atibaia	Unnamed	0	3	3	A 15-year-old student at a technical school cut three female students with scissors before trying to escape and being restrained by employees.
20 February 2017	Goiás	Unnamed	0	2	2	A 17-year-old student shot a classmate after a fight over a kite, a child ended up being accidentally hit. Both suffered minor injuries.
1 July 2017	Jundiaí	Edmilson José dos Santos	2	0	2	A 46-year-old man invaded a school in Jundiai and killed his ex-girlfriend, who was an employee at the school, before killing himself with a shot to the head.
5 October 2017	Janaúba	Damião Soares dos Santos	14	37	51	Janaúba massacre: A 50-year-old janitor burned down a daycare, killing himself in the process. The motive for the attack is unknown.
20 October 2017	Goiânia	J.C.A.M	2	4	6	Goyases School shooting: A 14-year-old student shot dead two of his classmates and wounded four others.
6 November 2017	Alexânia	Misael Pereira de Olair	1	0	1	A 21-year-old former student invaded a school and shot and killed a 17-year-old female student.
30 August 2018	Boituva	Edivan Fransisco da Silva	0	2	2	A man stabbed his ex-girlfriend on a school bus. The bus driver tried to help the victim and was also stabbed before the man escaped.
4 September 2018	Angatuba	Unnamed	0	3	3	A young man who is believed to be a former student attacked a school bus driver and two students after the driver refused to give him a ride.
28 September 2018	Medianeira	Unnamed	0	2	2	Medianeira school shooting: Two 15-year-old students shot and wounded two of their classmates as a response to bullying before being arrested by police.
13 March 2019	Suzano	Guilherme Taucci Monteiro; Luiz Henrique de Castro	10 (Note: Including both perpetrators.)	11	21	Suzano massacre: Two former students killed one of the two's uncle, then shot dead another seven and wounding eleven students at the Professor Raul Brasil State School before committing a murder-suicide.
21 May 2019	Belo Horizonte	Unnamed	0	3	3	An 11-year-old student with mental problems stabbed a student and strangled two others at a school in Belo Horizonte.
21 August 2019	Charqueadas	Unnamed	0	7	7	A 17-year-old youth broke into a school with a hatchet and injured seven students.
19 September 2019	São Paulo	Unnamed	0	2	2	A 14-year-old student stabbed a teacher in the hallway and then himself.
7 November 2019	Caraí	Unnamed	0	2	2	A student invaded a school in Caraí using a firearm, injuring two students in the process.
6 December 2019	Florianópolis	Unnamed	0	3	3	Three women were attacked with knives and clubs by a 30-year-old man who had been fighting over room swaps in the student residence.
29 March 2021	Americana	Unnamed	0	2	2	A 13-year-old student, armed with a pellet gun, shot an employee before trying to kill himself.
4 May 2021	Saudades	Fabiano Kipper Mai	5	2	7	Saudades massacre: An 18-year-old man attacked a nursery school with a katana and firecrackers, killing three infants and two staff members along with injuring another infant.
7 June 2021	Erechim	Unnamed	0	2	2	A 23-year-old man broke into a technical school and stabbed two employees before being restrained.
13 September 2021	Laranjal Paulista	Unnamed	0	2	2	A 13-year-old student entered a school to hand in his work, but then stabbed the principal and an apprentice employee.
22 February 2022	Caraguatatuba	Unnamed	0	2	2	A 16-year-old student stabbed his principal as he was leaving the school and then fled, injuring himself during the escape.
23 February 2022	Manaus	Matheus Alex Moreira da Silva	1	2	3	A fight between students that took place inside the school on the way out resulted in a student killing a classmate and stabbing two others.
22 March 2022	São Paulo	Unnamed	0	2	2	A 13-year-old student stabbed a classmate and her friend at Colégio Floresta.
31 March 2022	Goiânia	Islane Pereira Saraiva Xavier	0	1	1	A bullied student set another student on fire, causing severe injuries.
8 April 2022	Saquarema	Unnamed	0	0	0	A 14-year-old with homemade bombs entered his school, detonating several explosives before being stopped by a school guard.
6 May 2022	Governador Island	Unnamed	0	2	2	A 14-year-old student stabbed three classmates, during the attack the student filmed the stabbing.
28 June 2022	Recanto das Emas	Unnamed	0	2	2	Two students were stabbed by a 16-year-old classmate.
19 August 2022	Vitória	Henrique Lira Trad	0	3	3	Vitória school attack: A former student invaded a school in Vitoria with several weapons and injured three people.
26 September 2022	Barreiras	I.S.C.	1	1	2	2022 Barreiras school attack: A 14-year-old student killed a wheelchair-using teenage student with a revolver and machete before being injured by responding police officers and taken into custody.
27 September 2022	Morro do Chapéu	Unnamed	0	1	1	A 13-year-old student stabbed a coordinator and set fire to the classroom before being arrested. No one was injured in the flames.
5 October 2022	Sobral	Unnamed	1	2	3	2022 Sobral school shooting: A 15-year-old student fires a single firearm that hits three students of the same age, killing one of them, who dies days later in a hospital.
22 November 2022	Mesquita	Unnamed	0	0	0	A teenager set fire to a classroom after bringing gasoline into his school. He was charged with attempted murder.
25 November 2022	Aracruz	Gabriel Rodrigues Castiglioni	3	8	11	Aracruz school shootings: A 16-year-old boy invaded a school in Aracruz and shot 11 teachers, killing two of them instantly, a third died the following day and the young man escaped.
25 November 2022	Aracruz	Gabriel Rodrigues Castiglioni	1	2	3	Aracruz school shootings: The same shooter invaded a second school and shot three students, killing a 12-year-old girl.
25 November 2022	Colatina	Unnamed	0	4	4	A 15-year-old student entered the Escola 1º Grau Cleres Martins Moreira. The student walked through the hallways with a homemade box cutter, stabbing four students in the face right after recess. An intern and a teacher who were present managed to restrain the student.
14 December 2022	Ipaussu	Thiago Oliveira Silva	0	2	2	A 22-year-old former student broke into a school and stabbed two teachers, as well as taking a hostage by holding a knife up to his throat. The perpetrator, who reportedly admired the assailants of the Columbine High School massacre and was armed with a knife, a pocketknife and an imitation firearm, was later sentenced to 33 years' imprisonment.
9 February 2023	Panorama	Unnamed	0	3	3	In a fight in front of the school, a 16-year-old student stabbed two classmates, one of whom was also armed, and stabbed the student.
13 February 2023	Monte Mor	Unnamed	0	0	0	A former student armed with a hatchet and multiple bombs threw explosives at a school, one of which detonated in a bathroom.
28 February 2023	Ipuã	Unnamed	0	4	4	A transgender student stabbed a classmate and beat three others during a school fight.
27 March 2023	São Paulo	Unnamed	1	4	5	São Paulo school stabbing: A 13-year-old student stabs four teachers and a student, killing one of the teachers, before the student is restrained.
28 March 2023	Caxias	Unnamed	0	0	0	A 16-year-old with a shotgun broke into a school and fired multiple shots before fainting and being subdued by staff.
28 March 2023	Rio de Janeiro	Unnamed	0	0	0	A 15-year-old attempted to stab other students at a school in Gávea, but was subdued by adults before he hurt anyone.
30 March 2023	Belém	Unnamed	0	1	1	A student stabbed a colleague at Palmira Gabriel State School. Multiple other edge weapons were found in his backpack.
5 April 2023	Blumenau	Luiz Henrique de Lima	4	5	9	2023 Blumenau school attack: A 25-year-old man attacked a daycare center with a hatchet, killing four children and injuring five others.
10 April 2023	Manaus	Unnamed	0	3	3	A 12-year-old student stabs two classmates and a teacher, he was armed with homemade bombs and a knife.
11 April 2023	Santa Tereza de Goiás	Unnamed	0	3	3	A 13-year-old student stabs three classmates, a staff member manages to restrain the attacker.
12 April 2023	Farias Brito	Unnamed	0	2	2	A 14-year-old student stabbed two 9-year-old students in the head, it was the third attack in three days.
19 June 2023	Cambé	Marcos Vinícius da Silva Damas	2	0	2	Helena Kolody school shooting: A former student of an institution in Cambé shot and killed two students. Killing one of them instantly, while the other died the next day. He committed suicide in his prison cell two days later.
18 September 2023	Leme	Unnamed	0	2	2	A 16-year-old student attacked two female students with a hammer, seriously injuring one of them.
10 October 2023	Poços de Caldas	Unnamed	1	3	4	Dom Bosco school stabbing: A 14-year-old former student attacked three students and a counselor in front of a school, killing one of the students.
23 October 2023	São Paulo	Lucas de Oliveira Tuci	1	3	4	Sapopemba State School shooting: A student shot at three students, killing one of them, before turning himself into police.
1 November 2023	Claro dos Poções	Manoel Pinheiro Neto	2	1	3	A 52-year-old man shot his own 5-year-old son and his ex-girlfriend's current boyfriend, killing his son. Before the man killed himself with a shot to the head.
22 November 2023	São Luís	Unnamed	0	5	5	A student armed with pepper spray sprayed four classmates before being restrained and beaten by local students.
20 February 2024	Anápolis	Maria Renata, 45; Kaio Rodrigues, 20; Unnamed	1	2	3	A fight between students in front of a school led to a mother and her two sons, aged 15 and 20, attacking three boys with knives and hammers, killing one of them.
4 March 2024	São Sebastião	Unnamed	0	5	5	A 15-year-old student stabbed three classmates, including a pregnant woman, as well as a teacher and a school principal, before surrendering after the two staff members held him down with a chair.
19 March 2024	Londrina	Unnamed	0	2	2	A fight resulted in two people being stabbed at a school in Londrina.
20 March 2024	Salto da Divisa	Unnamed	0	4	4	A 17-year-old student stabbed two classmates and a female employee before attempting to stab himself to death.
17 June 2024	Belo Horizonte	Unnamed	0	2	2	A 13-year-old autistic student armed with a knife stabbed a 12-year-old girl and her 11-year-old friend. Both victims ran to the principal's office for help. The attacker was then apprehended.
18 October 2024	Heliópolis	Samuel Santana Andrade	4	0	4	Heliópolis school shooting: A 14-year-old student fatally shot three people before committing suicide. The motive is currently under investigation.
17 December 2024	Natal	Lyedja Yasmin SIlva Santos	0	1	1	A 19-year-old student shot a teacher, injuring a student nearby. She later claimed to have planned out a massacre and wanted to kill 10 people.
13 March 2025	Guaratuba	Unnamed	0	4	4	A 25-year-old former student stabbed four students in front of a school after a fight involving him and one of the victims.
3 April 2025	Campina Grande	Flávio Medeiros	2	1	3	A 47-year-old businessman motivated by jealousy invades the photocopier room of the Universidade Pública da Paraíba (UEPB) and shoots and kills one person and injures another before attempting suicide and dying a day later.
9 April 2025	Vacaria	Unnamed	0	4	4	A 16-year-old student stabbed three classmates in front of a school, due to a conflict between students from two schools in the city. The principal of one of the schools fell and suffered bruises while trying to stop the fight.
12 June 2025	Itanhaém	Unnamed	0	1	1	A student stabbed a 15-year-old classmate during a fight over a classroom seat.
8 July 2025	Estação	Unnamed	1	3	4	Estação school stabbing: A 16-year-old stabbed three student and a female teacher at a primary school, killing one, before being arrested.
25 September 2025	Sobral	Bruno Amorim Rodrigues Unnamed	2	3	5	2025 Sobral school shooting: A pair of criminals invaded a school in Sobral and attacked five students aged 16 to 17, killing two and injuring three, before fleeing.
8 October 2025	Marília	Unnamed	0	1	1	A 14-year-old entered a school with a knife and chased an employee, who fell and injured himself during the chase, but was not injured by the suspect.
28 November 2025	Rio de Janeiro	João Antônio Miranda Tello Ramos Gonçalves	3	0	3	Maracanã school shooting: A 47-year-old former employee went into a school and opened fire with a pistol, killing two female employees and himself.
2 December 2025	Fortaleza	Unnamed	0	4	4	A 15-year-old student with three knives stabbed a classmate and two faculty members who came to help the victim. The attacker was treated for minor injuries after being arrested.
7 December 2025	Ipatinga	Unnamed; Unnamed; Unnamed; Unnamed	0	4	4	An explosive device was thrown into a primary school as a school event was occurring, injuring four students. Four minors aged 12 to 17 were arrested.
6 February 2026	Porto Velho	João Cândido da Costa Junior	1	0	1	A 24-year-old student stabbed a teacher to death at a college.
10 February 2026	Tianguá	Unnamed	0	2	2	A student with schizophrenia stabbed a school director and coordinator before fleeing the school. He was arrested nearby with three knives in his backpack.
16 March 2026	Barreiros	Unnamed	0	3	3	A student stabbed three other students before being subdued by employees.
18 March 2026	Uberlândia	Unnamed	0	1	1	A student stabbed another student in an apparent retaliation for bullying.
19 March 2026	Vitória	Unnamed	0	1	1	A 13-year-old student stabbed another student at random.
19 March 2026	Pinhais	Unnamed	0	1	1	A 17-year-old student injured another student with a box cutter.
7 April 2026	Suzano	Samuel Gomes de Oliveira	0	2	2	An 18-year-old ex-student broke into a school with a sword and slashed a teacher. Other employees subdued the attacker, who injured himself before police arrive.
8 April 2026	Ituiutaba	Unnamed	0	5	5	A 16-year-old male student with a knife attacked and injured five children at a school.
28 April 2026	Feira de Santana, Bahia	Unnamed	1	1	2	A shooting in front of a school left one person dead and another injured.
5 May 2026	Rio Branco	Unnamed	2	2	4	2026 Rio Branco school shooting: A 13-year-old student opened fire at his school with a handgun stolen from his stepfather and killed 2 school workers and injured 2 students.
9 October 2026	Curitiba, Paraná	Unnamed	1	2	3	A man armed with a knife took 13 children and staff members hostage at a school in Curitiba, and threatened to set it on fire, before being shot dead by police. The hostages were rescued, with two children sustaining injuries.
