= Suzano massacre copycat crimes =

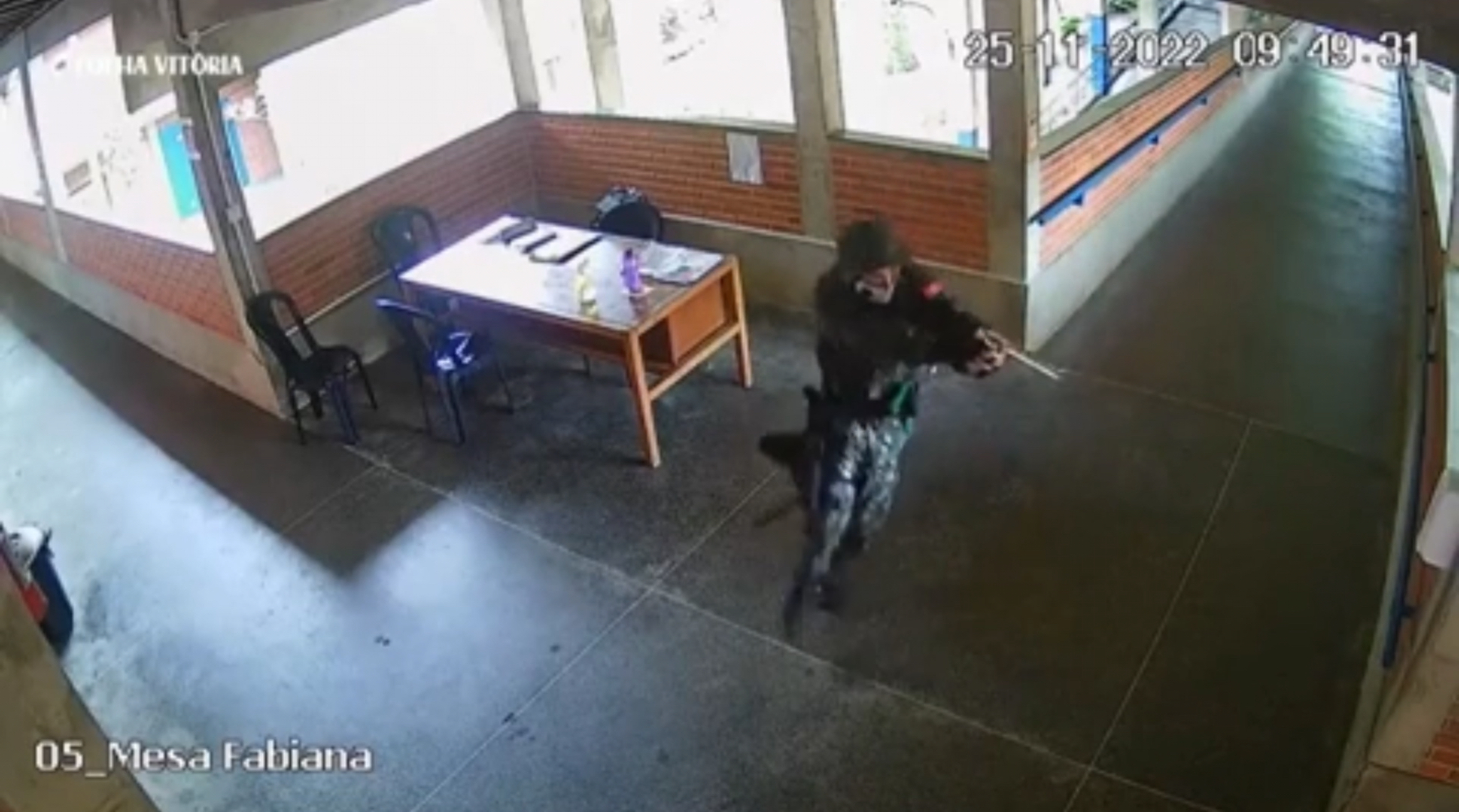
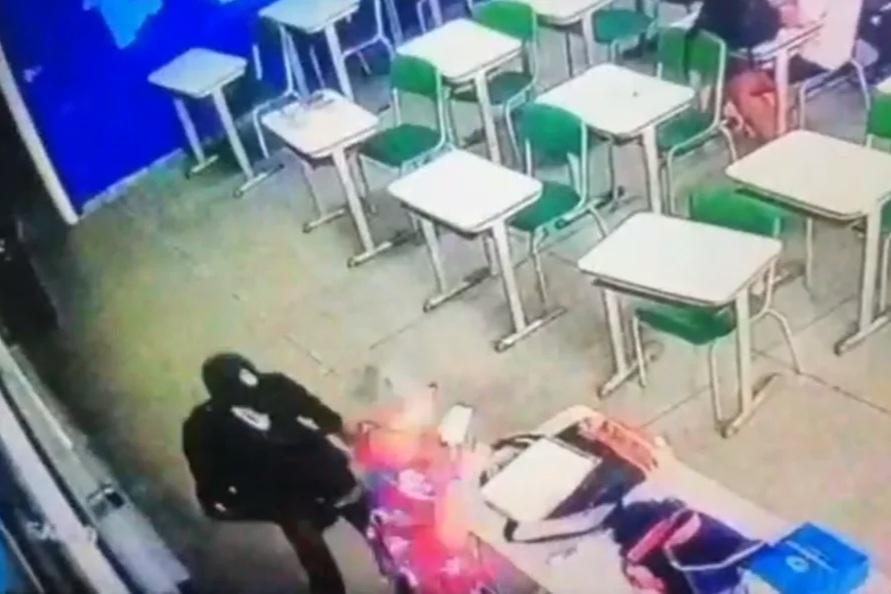
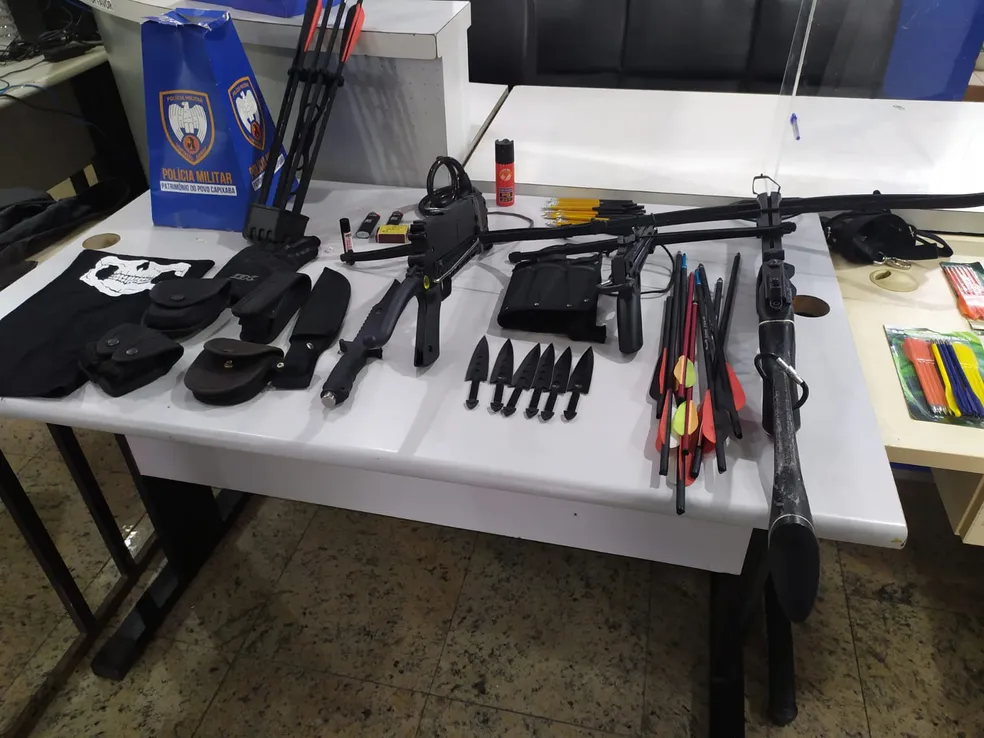
Clockwise from top left: CCTV footage of the 2019 Charqueadas school attack; CCTV footage of the 2022 Aracruz school shootings; Evidence table photo of the weaponry carried by Henrique Lira Trad during the 2022 Vitória school attack; CCTV footage of the São Paulo school stabbing

The Suzano massacre has become an inspiration for perpetrators of crimes such as stabbings and shootings in Latin America. The attack has been cited in connection with later incidents in Brazil and Mexico.

== Background ==
On 13 March 2019, a school shooting took place at the Professor Raul Brasil State School in Suzano, São Paulo, Brazil. A pair of former students, 17-year old Guilherme Taucci Monteiro and 25-year-old Luiz Henrique de Castro, killed five students and two school staff members. Before committing the attack, Taucci had killed his uncle. After killing most of their victims in the school, Taucci then killed his own partner and committed suicide. Gunshots wounded 11 people.

== List of copycat crimes ==
=== Successful copycat crimes ===
Date	Location	Attacker(s)	Dead	Injured	Description
20 August 2019	Rio–Niterói Bridge, Rio de Janeiro	Willian Augusto da Silva	1 (the perpetrator)	0	20-year-old Willian Augusto da Silva held a bus hostage on the Rio-Niterói Bridge for three and a half hours using a toy gun, a knife and a bottle full of gasoline until he was killed by a BOPE sniper. Willian had researched the massacre prior to the hostage-taking and used a bandana with a skull imprint identical to the one Guilherme Taucci used during the Suzano massacre during the crime.
21 August 2019	Charqueadas, Rio Grande do Sul	Unnamed 17-year-old	0	7	2019 Charqueadas school attack: At around 1:30 P.M., A 17-year-old ex-student entered the Instituto Estadual Educacional Assis Chateaubrian state school through an open back door armed with a molotov cocktail and a hatchet, before opening the door to a seventh grade classroom and throwing the lit molotov cocktail inside, when it didnt explode the 17-year-old begun attacking the fleeing students with the hatchet until being disarmed by the school's Physical Education teacher. The attack had been planned for at least three months and the attacker admitted to being inspired by the Suzano massacre.
19 August 2022	Vitória, Espírito Santo	Henrique Lira Trad	0	3	2022 Vitória school attack: Henrique Lira Trad, an 18-year-old former student, invaded his former school with crossbows, molotov cocktails and knives. His plan was to kill "as many people as possible in the school" and force a confrontation with the police, where he would be killed. It is known that Henrique began planning his attack after the Suzano massacre, according to authorities.
25 November 2022	Aracruz, Espírito Santo	Gabriel Rodrigues Castiglioni	4	11	Aracruz school shootings: 16-year-old Gabriel Rodrigues Castiglioni attacked two different schools in Aracruz, Espírito Santo. Four people were killed, and 11 others were injured. Rodrigues was part of online true crime communities and was inspired by the Suzano massacre.
27 March 2023	Vila Sônia, São Paulo	Unnamed 13-year-old	1	5	São Paulo school stabbing: A 13-year-old student (whose identity was not revealed) stabbed four teachers, killing one, and injured another student with a knife. His X (Twitter) nickname was "Taucci", and he also was wearing a skull mask during the attack.
10 April 2023	Manaus, Amazonas	Unnamed 12-year-old	0	4 (including the perpetrator)	Two students and one teacher were superficially injured after being stabbed by a 12-year-old wielding a kitchen knife at the Adventista Manaus State School (pt:Colégio Estadual Adventista Manaus).According to classmates, the boy was a neo-Nazi who idolized Guilherme Taucci.
19 June 2023	Cambé, Paraná	Marcos Vinícius da Silva Damas	2	0	Cambé school shooting: Marcos Vinícius da Silva Damas, a 21-year-old former student, shot and killed two 16-year-old students. Marcos mentioned the Suzano massacre in a notebook found by police.
6 March 2024	Guadalajara, Jalisco	Gabriel Alejandro Galaviz González	3 (1 at the motel)	1	Technological University of Guadalajara attack: Gabriel Alejandro Galaviz, a 20-year-old man, invaded a private university where he killed two female workers and injured another male worker with an ax and two knives. He also killed another woman at a motel before attacking at the university. Gabriel published pictures of Guilherme Taucci Monteiro and other school shooters on his Facebook profile. On August 5, 2024, he committed suicide while imprisoned.
2 April 2024	Vantaa, Finland	Unnamed 12-year-old	1	2	Viertola school shooting: On 2 April 2024, a shooting occurred at the Viertola school, Jokiranta site in Vantaa, Finland. The gunman, a 12-year-old fired a revolver at three students, all aged 12. One victim was killed while two were seriously injured. On the weeks leading up to the shooting, the perpetrator researched multiple school shootings, including the Suzano massacre.
16 December 2024	Madison, Wisconsin	Natalie Lynn "Samantha" Rupnow	3 (including the perpetrator)	6	2024 Abundant Life Christian School shooting: On December 16, 2024, a school shooting occurred at Abundant Life Christian School in Madison, Wisconsin, United States. Two people were killed and six others were injured. The perpetrator, 15-year-old Natalie Lynn "Samantha" Rupnow, committed suicide at the scene. Natalie mentioned Guilherme Taucci as someone she found interesting in her manifesto alongside Eric Harris, Dylan Klebold and "Patrick Woods Crusius" [sic].
22 January 2025	Nashville, Tennessee	Solomon Sahmad Charlie Henderson	2 (including the perpetrator)	2 (1 by gunfire)	2025 Antioch High School shooting: Solomon Henderson, a 17-year-old student, opened fire on his classmates, killing one and injuring another before committing suicide. In the shooter's diary, he cited attacks located in various parts of the world, including Brazil, and took photographs of himself emulating the visual aesthetics and gestures of Taucci.
1 October 2026	Torreón, Coahuila	Two Unnamed 18-year-olds	1	8 (Including the perpetrators)	Two 18-year-old brothers allegedly invaded their former school using bladed weapons and explosive devices, leaving their vice-principal dead and several others injured. They were both arrested at the scene of the crime.. During the attack, they allegedly wore a black shirt featuring multiple pictures of previous mass killers, Including Guilherme Taucci.

=== Unsuccessful copycat crimes ===
As of 2019, at least 18 universities throughout Brazil received Suzano massacre-inspired threats.

Date (of arrest)	Location	Perpetrator(s)	Description
12 June 2026	Ponta Grossa, Paraná	Unidentified 19-year-old	A 19-year-old was arrested in Ponta Grossa, Paraná after making threats against two municipal schools through social media, the perpetrator's profile used to publish the threats made reference to the surname of one of the Suzano perpetrator's.

== See also ==
- Christchurch mosque shootings copycat crimes
- Columbine High School massacre copycat crimes
- Isla Vista attacks copycat crimes
- True Crime Community
