= 2019 Charqueadas school attack =

2019 crime in Brazil

- The unnamed 17-year-old attacker, seen holding a lit Molotov cocktail prior to entering a classroom.
- Location: Assis Chateaubriand State Education Institute, Charqueadas, Rio Grande do Sul, Brazil
- Date: August 21, 2019 c. 1:30 p.m. (BRT, UTC−03:00)
- Attack type: Mass stabbing; Arson; Attempted Mass murder
- Weapons: Molotov cocktails; Hatchet
- Injuries: ~7
- Perpetrators: 17-year-old teenager
- Defender: Juliano Mantovani
- Motive: Suzano massacre copycat crime

On August 21, 2019, a 17-year-old former student entered the Assis Chateaubriand State Education Institute in Charqueadas, Rio Grande do Sul, armed with a hatchet and Molotov cocktails, attacking multiple students before a physical education teacher intervened and restrained him.

== Background ==
The Assis Chateaubriand State Education Institute serves approximately 700 students across elementary, high school, and technical education levels and is considered a quiet location.

In November 2018, a 20-year-old man fatally stabbed 17-year-old Mikael Silveira Fischer during a fight in front of the school before fleeing the scene.

In March 2019, the Suzano massacre took place, in which two perpetrators—aged 25 and 17—stormed a school in Suzano, killing seven people and injuring 11 others before one of them killed his accomplice and committed suicide. The young man who invaded the institute had been inspired by that attack and had also used a hatchet and Molotov cocktails.

== Attack ==
A former student snuck into the Assis Chateaubriand State Education Institute in Charqueadas, Rio Grande do Sul, Brazil, armed with molotov cocktails and a hatchet. The attack reportedly took place around 1:30 p.m. local time.

He entered a 7th grade classroom and threw one of the Molotov cocktails inside, though it did not strike any students or staff. The attacker then used the hatchet to strike students before being tackled and restrained by Juliano Mantovani, a physical education teacher; however, the young man managed to break free and flee the school. The young man struck seven students, including a 12-year-old boy who tried to protect his classmates and was hit by a blow from the hatchet.

That same afternoon, the young man, accompanied by his father—a retired military police officer—turned himself in at the local police station and appeared remorseful.

== Perpetrator ==
The perpetrator was a 17-year-old former student who had attended the school until 2015. He had drawn inspiration from the Suzano massacre, carried out by two other former students aged 17 and 25. The young man had a sister who attended the school, and he took the opportunity to drive her there every day in order to monitor her movements and the school's schedule.

In his statement, the teenager claimed he wanted to kill a school rival—reportedly a former student. He did not know the individual's name and provided only a nickname; investigators were unable to locate the person, even after contacting the school administration. They came to suspect that this rival did not actually exist and was merely a pretext for attacking the school.

The teenager also intended to commit suicide after the attack, but the plan was thwarted by the teacher who restrained him.

The teenager had planned the attack for at least three months.

== See also ==
- 2022 Vitória school attack - Another school attack directly inspired by the Suzano massacre
