= São Caetano do Sul school shooting =

School shooting in Brazil

- Location: Alcina Dantas Feijão school, São Caetano do Sul, São Paulo state, Brazil
- Date: 3:50 PM, 22 September 2011; 15 years ago
- Target: Rosileide Queiros de Oliveira
- Attack type: School shooting
- Weapon: .38-caliber revolver (Note: Davi took his father's revolver.)
- Deaths: 1 (the perpetrator)
- Injuries: 1
- Perpetrator: Davi Mota Nogueira
- Motive: Unknown

On 22 September 2011, a school shooting occurred at Alcina Dantas Feijão school in São Caetano do Sul, São Paulo state, Brazil. A 10-year-old student, Davi Mota Nogueira, shot and injured a 38-year-old teacher, Rosileide Queiros de Oliveira, before committing suicide.

== Shooting ==
At 3:50 p.m., de Oliveira entered the classroom. She had not begun her scheduled Portuguese lesson when Nogueira, who had asked permission to use the restroom, returned and shot her in the back. After the attack, Nogueira ran into the corridor connecting the classroom to the street, leaving his classmates behind. Upon reaching the stairs, he fatally shot himself in the head.

== Perpetrator ==
Davi Mota Nogueira was a 10-year-old fourth-grader. According to his teachers, he was a quiet child who had no disciplinary problems and showed no signs of being bullied. The principal noted that he was an average student, receiving grades between 6 and 10, with no complaints from his parents. Furthermore, he got along well with his classmates and had no record of conflicts with his teacher.

=== Davi's social networks ===
Davi had at least 73 friends on the social network Orkut. His page contains 36 photos.

=== Family ===
The family consists of four members, including Davi: his father, Milton Evangelista Nogueira; his mother, Elenice da Silva Mota Nogueira; and an older brother.In the Nogueira family, religion is a topic of conversation for everyone. On Tuesdays, the family gathers together to study the Bible.

=== Last conversation with parents ===
In his last conversation with his parents, Davi said that he would like to have a big family with many children.

== Victim ==
Rosileide Queiros de Oliveira was injured in the lower left back, underwent surgery, and recovered. She no longer teaches at the aforementioned school.

== See also ==
=== Other school attacks in Brazil ===
- Campinas school shooting
- Rio de Janeiro school shooting
- Suzano massacre
- Saudades massacre
