= 2023 Blumenau school attack =

Attack on a daycare center in Blumenau, Brazil

Blumenau school attack
- Location: 26.91568°S 49.10983°W; Blumenau, Santa Catarina, Brazil
- Date: 5 April 2023; 3 years ago 9:00 (BRT (UTC-3))
- Target: Cantinho Bom Pastor nursery
- Attack type: Mass stabbing Mass murder Infanticide
- Weapons: Tomahawk; Butterfly knife
- Deaths: 4
- Injuries: 5
- Perpetrator: Luiz Henrique de Lima
- Motive: Disputed: thrill killing (prosecution); psychotic break (defense)

On April 5, 2023, a hatchet attack occurred at a daycare center in Blumenau, Santa Catarina, Brazil. Four children were killed; five others were injured. Luiz Henrique Lima, a 25-year-old male and the suspected attacker, who is believed to have jumped over a wall to gain access to the school, surrendered at a nearby police station.

== Background ==
School attacks increased in Brazil in the years prior to the attack. Out of 16 school attacks in Brazil between 2000 and 2022, four occurred in the second half of 2022. A previous attack on a daycare occurred in 2021, when an 18-year-old man killed three children and two adults at a daycare in Saudades, Santa Catarina. A week prior to the Blumenau attack, a student in the Thomazia Montoro State School, São Paulo, killed a teacher and wounded four others in a stabbing attack. On March 30, at the "Escola Estadual de Ensino Fundamental e Médio Prof.º Palmira Gabriel" in Icoaraci, district of Belém, an student attacked his colleagues with a knife, leaving one student injured.

== Attack ==
At around 9:00 BRT (12:00 GMT), Luiz Henrique Lima jumped over a wall of the Cantinho Bom Pastor daycare center and began attacking children in the playground. Around 40 children were reported to have been inside the center at the time of the attack. Lima started the attack by striking children with the tomahawk. The tomahawk would eventually get stuck in the head of one of the children. Lima switched to his golden butterfly knife to attack the rest of the victims, even stomping on the head of one of the injured survivors. The attack lasted 20 seconds. A teacher said that Luiz Henrique carried a hatchet and other unspecified weapons. He apparently targeted his victims at random, primarily aiming for their heads. According to police, he fled after teachers defended the children and turned himself in to police at a local station.

=== Other attacks ===
During the weeks after the attack, there were several other attack attempts in schools; on April 10, at the Cachoeirinha Adventist School, in Manaus, a student, armed with a knife, stabbed a teacher and two students, leaving them with minor injuries. The following day (April 11), at the Dr. Marco Aurélio State College in Santa Tereza de Goiás, a thirteen-year-old student attacked several people with a knife, leaving three students with minor injuries. On April 12, two students were injured in the Isaac de Alcântara Costa School, Farias Brito, Ceará, after a 9th grade student attacked several people with a knife. In addition, threats of massacres began to circulate on social networks in a large part of the country, which caused suspension of classes, rescheduling of tests and administrative meetings in schools.

According to Michele Prado, a researcher at the University of São Paulo (USP)'s Digital Media Political Debate Monitor, the publication of the aggressor's image or action in the press or social media can encourage a "window of contagion effect" for new attacks; according to Prado, the literature indicates that this "window" lasts about 13 or 14 days after the repercussions of an attack happen, which would explain the short time span between all the attacks.

== Victims ==
Four children between the ages of five and seven were killed in the attack. Five others, aged between three and five, were injured and taken to hospitals. One was in severe condition. The children killed were veiled and buried in Blumenau, while the survivors were released from the hospital the next day.

== Perpetrator ==
The suspect was identified as a 25-year-old man named Luiz Henrique de Lima, many news media outlets refused to disclose further information about him (such as his name), fearing giving more attention to the case, which experts said may stimulate more attacks. Early investigations revealed that he was previously detained for drug possession, as well as injury and harm, including stabbing his stepfather and his dog. Police said that the suspect did not appear to have any connection to the daycare center. Authorities revealed the suspect reportedly had a psychotic episode. Further evidence suggest premeditation in the crime as he started researching ax models on March 15, 2023. He was also not diagnosed with any mental disorders. However, drugs were present in the toxicology, but the prosecution concluded he was completely sane during the act, and could tell from right or wrong. He was also looking up videos of attacks and researched other crimes before his own massacre.

=== News coverage ===
Due to the "window of contagion effect" and studies indicating that many of the criminals seek fame by perpetrating the attacks, on the same day Grupo Globo announced a change in the policy of covering massacres, announcing that the names and images of the criminals, as well as images of the actions, would never again be disclosed, before, as explained by journalists such as William Bonner, who gave the information in Jornal Nacional, the policy was to disclose this data only once, "This policy changes this Wednesday (5th) and will be even more restrictive: the name and image of perpetrators of attacks will never be published, as well as videos of the actions; The decision follows the most recent recommendations of prestigious experts on the subject, for whom giving visibility to aggressors can serve as a stimulus to new attacks", Bonner explained.

O Estado de S. Paulo did not release photos or videos of the attack, on the portal, shortly after the crime, next to the published news, there was the following note:

O Estadão decided not to publish photos, videos, names or other information about the author of the attack, even though he is of legal age; This decision follows recommendations from experts in communication and violence, research shows that this exposure can lead to an "effect of contagion", appreciation and stimulation of the act of violence in hateful individuals and communities, which results in new cases, the visibility of the aggressors is considered a “trophy” within these networks, for the same reason, videos of the attack on a state school in Vila Sônia, west of São Paulo, on March 27 were also not released

== Aftermath ==
On August 29, 2024, Luiz Henrique Lima was sentenced to 220 years' imprisonment. He will not have the right to appeal while free. The criminal was convicted of four murders and five attempted murders, with the aggravating factors of base motive, cruel means, use of a resource that hindered the defense of the victims, and crime against minors under 14 years of age.
