= Cambé school shooting =

2023 school shooting in Brazil

Helena Kolody school shooting
- Image of the school shooter
- Location: Cambé, Paraná, Brazil
- Date: 19 June 2023 c. 9:30 a.m. (BRT)
- Target: Students and staff at the Professor Helena Kolody State School
- Attack type: School Shooting
- Weapon: .38-caliber revolver
- Deaths: 2
- Injuries: 0
- Victims: Karoline Verri Alves (17); Luan Augusto da Silva (16)
- Perpetrators: Marcos Vinícius da Silva Damas, 21 years old
- No. of participants: 1
- Defender: A school employee
- Motive: Alleged revenge for past bullying

The Cambé school shooting was a school shooting that occurred on 19 June 2023 at the Colégio Estadual Professora Helena Kolody in Cambé, Paraná, Brazil. A 21-year-old former student, Marcos Vinícius da Silva Damas, entered the school under the pretense of requesting his academic transcript and opened fire with a .38 Caliber revolver. Two students, 17-year-old Karoline Verri Alves and 16-year-old Luan Augusto da Silva, were fatally shot.

The perpetrator was apprehended at the scene. Two days later, he was found dead in his jail cell. Police investigations indicated that Damas had planned the attack as an act of revenge for alleged bullying he experienced while attending the school.

== Shooting ==
On the morning of 19 June 2023, at around 9:30 a.m. (BRT), former student Marcos Vinícius da Silva Damas, aged 21, entered the Colégio Estadual Professora Helena Kolody in Cambé, Paraná. He told staff he was there to request a copy of his school transcript and was allowed inside. Once in a hallway near the main courtyard, he drew a revolver and began shooting at students.

Witnesses reported hearing approximately 15–16 shots before a school employee managed to subdue the shooter and restrain him until police arrived.

=== Victims ===
Two people died at the shooting: Couple 17-year-old Karoline Verri Alves, who died at the scene, and 16-year-old Luan Augusto da Silva, who was initially hospitalized, but eventually succumbed to his wounds on 20 June.

== Aftermath ==
The attacker was taken into custody by the Paraná State Police shortly after the shooting and charged with double homicide and attempted murder. Two days later, on 21 June 2023, Damas was found dead in his cell at the Cambé police station. Authorities reported that he appeared to have taken his own life, though the circumstances remained under investigation.

The shooting led to widespread public mourning in Cambé, and local authorities declared three days of official mourning. Classes were suspended for the remainder of the week, and psychological support was provided to students and teachers.

== Investigation ==
Police investigations revealed that Damas had premetitated the attack in advance and had expressed resentment over alleged bullying he experienced while attending the school. He reportedly told investigators that the shooting was an act of "revenge" and that he did not personally know his victims. Authorities stated that he legally owned the firearm used in the attack. In a notebook found by police, Damas wrote notes about various school shootings, most prominently the Suzano massacre, an event where two students killed eight people and injured a further eleven before dying in a suicide pact.

== Reactions ==
The incident sparked renewed debate in Brazil about rising violence in schools and the influence of extremist online communities. The Ministry of Education announced the strengthening of federal programs focused on school safety and psychological support for students and educators.

== See also ==
- List of school attacks in Brazil
