= 2026 Rio Branco school shooting =

School shooting in Brazil

- Location: Rio Branco, Acre, Brazil
- Date: 5 May 2026; 5 months ago c.1:30 p.m. (UTC−05:00)
- Target: Students and staff
- Attack type: School shooting, mass shooting
- Weapon: .38 TPC Taurus GX2 semi-automatic pistol
- Deaths: 2
- Injuries: 2
- Perpetrator: 13-year old male student
- Defender: Detained by the police
- Motive: Under investigation

On 5 May 2026, a 13-year-old boy opened fire at the Instituto São José school in Rio Branco, Acre, Brazil. The shooter killed two school workers and injured two other people, including an 11-year-old student, before being apprehended by police.

== Shooting ==
At 13:30, the 13-year-old student entered the school with a gun and opened fire. Since the school was undergoing renovations, other students thought the shooting sounds were coming from the construction activity. A worker of a hotel next to the school said that some students tried to climb a six-meter wall next to the hotel; only one was successful, and they hid in the hotel. The shooter later surrendered to the police.

== Victims ==
The deceased were identified as 53-year-old Alzenir Pereira da Silva and 37-year-old Raquel Sales Feitosa. A third employee and an 11-year-old student were also shot. Both were discharged from the hospital.

== Perpetrator ==
The perpetrator was identified as a 13-year-old student who used his stepfather’s .38 TPC pistol. His stepfather is a lawyer. Authorities are investigating the motives behind the attack, including the possibility of school bullying. According to investigators, some students knew of the plan in advance.

== Aftermath ==
Shortly after the attack ended, students formed a prayer circle in the school's pitch.

After the attack, the municipal governments of Rio Branco and Acre suspended classes at all schools and high schools in the region for three days (8 May 2026). The classes will be returned in the Monday (11 May 2026). The government also announced measures such as follow-up care for the victims of the attack and psychological support for students and teachers.

The shooter’s stepfather responsible for the gun was fired from his state government job and also detained, later released after being charged with neglecting to keep the gun away from a child's reach, a misdemeanor under Brazilian gun laws.

== See also ==
- List of school attacks in Brazil
