= 2022 Vitória school attack =

2022 school attack in Vitória, Brazil

Coordinates: 20.2815°S 40.2965°W

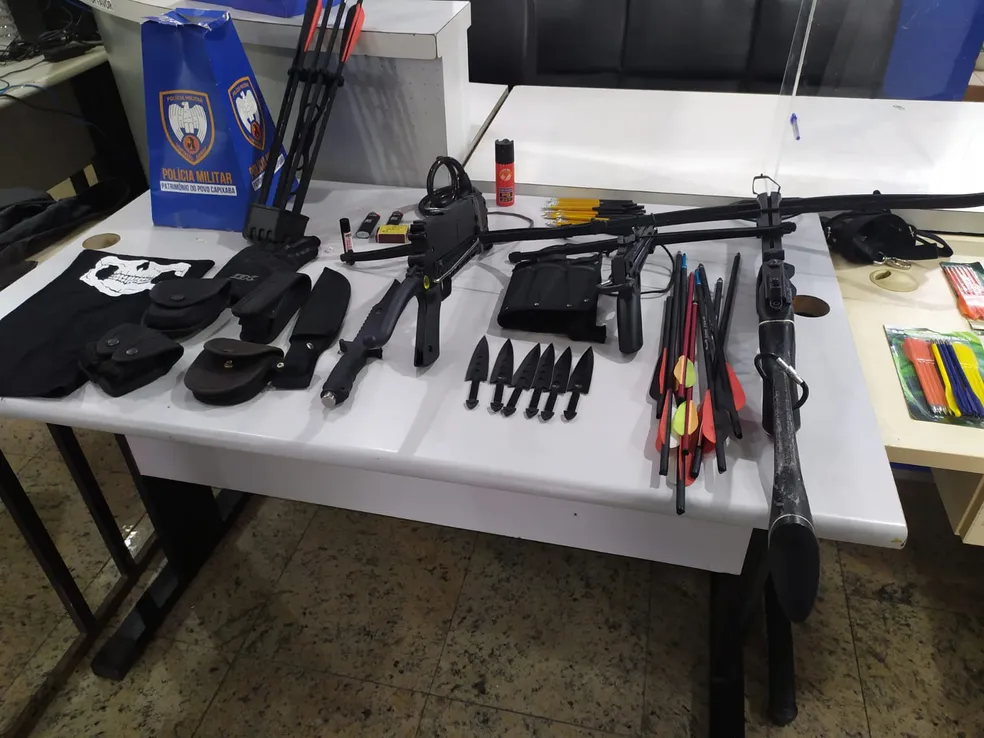
- Cache of weapons used in the attack.
- Location: Vitória, Espírito Santo, Brazil
- Date: 19 August 2022 c. 2:00 p.m.
- Target: Escola Municipal de Ensino Fundamental Eber Louzada Zippinotti
- Attack type: School attack
- Weapons: 150-pound Man Kung MK-150A2 recurve crossbow; 80-pound Man Kung MK-80A4PL pistol crossbow (unused); 50-pound Man Kung MK-50A1/5PL pistol crossbow (unused); Knife (unused); Six kunai (unused); Three Molotov cocktails (unused); Pepper spray (unused)
- Deaths: 0
- Injuries: 3
- Motive: Retaliation for bullying; Suicidal ideation; Suzano massacre copycat crime
- Accused: Henrique Lira Trad
- Charges: Attempted qualified murder (5 counts); Illegal constraint against a minor (1 count)

On 19 August 2022, a school attack took place at the Municipal School of Fundamental Teaching Éber Louzada Zippinotti in Vitória, Espírito Santo, Brazil. A 18-year-old former student, Henrique Lira Trad, threatened and attacked teachers, coordinators and students with a variety of weapons, including crossbows, knives and Molotov cocktails before being tackled and restrained by a physical education teacher, and was later arrested.

== Background ==
School attacks in Brazil have become more frequent since 2022. Analysts have linked these incidents to factors including access to violent content on social media, extremist ideologies, and broader social issues such as political polarization and weakened social bonds among youth.

The Municipal School of Fundamental Teaching Éber Louzada Zippinotti (in Portuguese, Escola Municipal de Ensino Fundamental Eber Louzada Zippinotti, abbreviated as EMEF Eber Louzada Zippinotti) is located in the Jardim da Penha neighborhood of Vitória, Espírito Santo.

== Attack ==
On 19 August 2022, at around 13:45, Henrique Lira Trad took an Uber ride to EMEF Eber Louzada Zippinotti. With him, he brought three crossbows (one traditional recurve crossbow and two smaller pistol crossbows), one large knife, six kunai knives, three Molotov cocktails, a bottle of flammable liquid, a bottle of pepper spray, matches, a lighter, tactical gloves, and a padlock, all in two backpacks. Arriving at 14:00, he initially tried directly going through the front entrance, claiming he was to go to a meeting, but was denied entry by the school staff, at which point he broke in by jumping over a wall, leaving one of his backpacks behind. He committed the attack while wearing all-black clothing and a skull mask.

After breaking in, he made his way to the teachers' lounge and shot at a staff member with his recurve crossbow (which would be the only weapon used in the attack) but missed, at which point the school staff closed the door on him. He then went back to the school entrance and closed it with his padlock to prevent potential victims from escaping before climbing the stairs to the second floor of the school to look for more potential victims. He tried shooting at a service provider, but again missed. On the second floor, he pointed his crossbow at a 10-year-old child's head and screamed "Shut up and come with me!". The child then kicked the crossbow out of Trad's hands, which shot a bolt on the way down, scratching the child's face. After this, the child grabbed the crossbow and threw it away from Trad's reach before running away. Trad then broke into a 5th-grade classroom and shot again at a teacher, hitting her in the leg. He shot again at another 10-year-old and missed once more. As he reloaded the crossbow, a school coordinator pushed him out of the classroom. Mistaking her for a different coordinator active at the school while he was still enrolled, he shot at her, injuring her in the leg.

As Trad reloaded his crossbow once more, a physical education teacher managed to tackle him. He was then tied up and immobilized by an off-duty officer until the arrival of the Military Police, which promptly arrested Trad for attempted murder. While he was restrained, he was cited as saying "Wow, what a fucking failure, even Timur Bekmansurov was better than me," referencing the perpetrator of the Perm State University shooting in Russia. Upon questioning, Trad stated his intention was to "kill as many people as possible" (specifying 6 or 7 as a possible number of victims) before forcing a confrontation with responding police forces in which he would be killed.

=== Victims ===
Three people were directly injured by crossbow bolts: One teacher (shot in the leg), one student (grazed by the cheek), and one school coordinator (shot in the leg).

== Accused ==
Henrique Lira Trad (born 16 April 2004) was raised by a family with a strong military tradition, with both a father and a grandfather being members of the Brazilian Armed Forces. While growing up, he was characterized as an introvert who was very interested in computers and online games.

During his stay at EMEF Eber Louzada Zippinotti, he was reportedly bullied, and organized his attack as a method of revenge. He began his planning in 2019, being "inspired" by the Suzano massacre, in which two former students killed seven people at their former high school (plus one at home) before dying in a suicide pact. According to his parents, in the months before the attack, he started showing more extreme introverted behavior, spending nearly every waking hour online, although he never showed any obvious mental health issues. He also started dressing in all-black clothing and showed an interest towards Adolf Hitler. He often discussed the possibility of committing such an attack with his colleagues.

He spent around 2,000 R$ (around $340 as of 2025) on supplies and weapons to be used in the attack, all bought online. In the hours preceding the attack, he played the Japanese role-playing video game Morimiya Middle School Shooting, in which a young woman arms herself and attacks her school before being confronted by police, for multiple hours.

== Legal proceedings ==
The young man was initially charged with six counts of attempted murder against two children and four school employees. While being interrogated, he claimed a second attacker was armed with bombs, circulating the area. He later admitted this statement was false. A one-month inquiry was opened into his behavior and online activities, which concluded on 29 September. On 19 May 2023, one of the counts of attempted murder was dropped, and replaced with one count of unlawful restraint.

Trad's defense has attempted to form an insanity plea, claiming that he was only trying to force a police response in which he would be shot dead, and had no interest in actually killing anyone. Court-appointed psychiatrists evaluated Trad shortly after the crime and found that he was criminally sane at the time of the crime and understood the consequences of his actions. In April 2025, his defense lawyers appealed this decision, from the Criminal Court of Serra to the Court of Justice of Espírito Santo.

Henrique Lira Trad's father was charged with procedural fraud, as he destroyed his son's cell phone hours after the attack right in front of a police station. The Public Ministry of Espirito Santo did not follow up on this complaint, however, as there was not enough evidence for a solid conviction.

While imprisoned, Trad was once beaten by six fellow inmates and had to change prisons, from Guarapari to Viana. As of December 2025, he was held under preventative detention at the Provisional Detention Center of the Rodrigo Figueiredo da Rosa Penitentiary Complex (Centro de Detenção Provisória do Complexo Penitenciário Rodrigo Figueiredo da Rosa).

Trad's trial was originally set for 13 October 2026, but was delayed due to health concerns, with his lawyer citing a possible tuberculosis diagnosis. It has since been set for 15 December 2026. If convicted, Trad faces over 50 years' imprisonment. (Note: Prisoners in Brazil can only serve up to 40 years in detention before they are released, even if sentenced to longer terms.)

== Aftermath ==
The week after his attack, the school implemented a panic button in the case of further attacks.

One month after the failed attack, a school shooting took place in the city of Barreiras, Bahia, where a 14-year-old student identified by his initials as I.S.C. attacked Eurides Santana Municipal School with a .38 revolver (stolen from his father, a policeman), a machete, a folding knife and an improvised explosive device, killing one girl before being shot and injured by police. Although the inquiry into Trad's actions had already concluded, a new investigation was opened after it was revealed I.S.C. and Trad were online acquaintances on the communication platform Discord. It was discovered they openly discussed their respective attacks' planning with each other. According to a manifesto by I.S.C., published on his Twitter account "Hannya_88", they talked together for a year, during which Trad tried to convince him to not commit the shooting, seeing as how he was younger than him. The teenager was apparently "inspired" by Trad's unsuccessful attack, and took its weak points as subjects of study while preparing for his own attack. He was later sentenced to three years' compulsory detainment, the harshest criminal penalty available for minors in Brazil.

In April 2023, his mother Adriana, a nurse, gave an interview where she described raising him and the potential warning factors for other parents to look out for, such as a sudden emotional coldness and how social isolation can lead to mental illness, a sentiment that had been shared by authorities in the weeks following the attack. In April 2025, she gave another interview, this time to the Brazilian podcast Mulheres Reais, where it was revealed that she had worked four jobs and sold her apartment in order to afford lawyers and psychiatrists for her son, and her entire family had been the subject of online harassment and death threats, especially Henrique's twin brother.

== See also ==
- List of unsuccessful attacks related to schools
- List of school attacks in Brazil
