= Saudades massacre =

Attack on a daycare in Saudades, Santa Catarina, Brazil

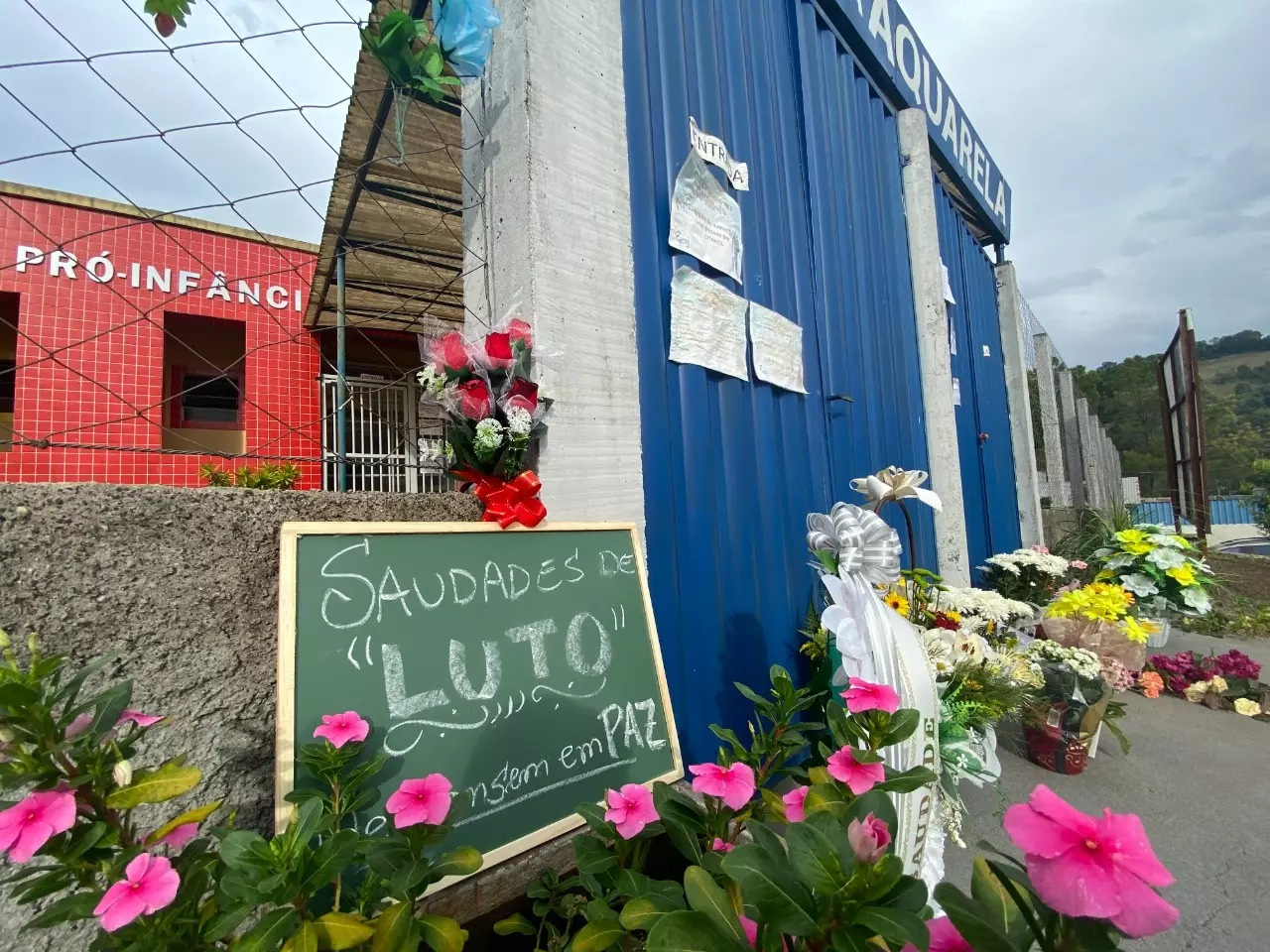
- Flowers left in front of the Pro-Childhood Aquarela daycare center.
- Location: 26°55′34″S 52°59′54″W; Saudades, Santa Catarina, Brazil
- Date: 4 May 2021; 5 years ago 9:50 (BRT (UTC-3))
- Target: Pro-Childhood Aquarela
- Attack type: Mass stabbing, mass murder, school stabbing, attempted murder-suicide
- Weapons: Sword Invictus Lancer II; Fireworks
- Deaths: 5
- Injuries: 2 (including the perpetrator)
- Perpetrator: Fabiano Kipper Mai
- Motive: Misanthropy
- Convictions: Qualified homicide (5 counts); Qualified attempted homicide (14 counts)
- Sentence: 329 years and 4 months' imprisonment

On 4 May 2021, a school massacre occurred at the municipal school of early childhood education (creche) Aquarela, located in the city of Saudades, near the city of Chapecó, in the Santa Catarina state of Brazil. The school serves children from 6 months to 2 years old.

Three children, a teacher and a staff member died in the attack, perpetrated by an 18-year-old native of the town, identified by authorities as Fabiano Kipper Mai.

== Stabbing ==
At around 9:50 BRT on Tuesday, 4 May 2021, Fabiano Kipper Mai, an 18-year-old youth with no criminal history, rode his bicycle to the Pro-Childhood Aquarela daycare center in downtown Saudades. Upon entering the daycare, he began by attacking a 30-year-old teacher who, although injured, ran into a room where four children and a school employee were, in an attempt to warn her of the danger. Fabiano Mai then attacked the children who were in the room and the employee. Two girls under the age of two and the teacher who suffered the initial attack died on the spot. Another child and the staff member later died in the hospital.

When the city's education secretary, Gisela Hermann, received a call reporting the case, she went to the scene and described what she saw: "We got there, a scene of terror. I managed to get into the school. There was a guy lying on the floor, but still alive, and also a dead teacher and child. The room was closed, they didn't let us in".

Female employees hid the children when the killer began the attack.

The Chapecó regional delegate, Ricardo Newton Casagrande, said that the young man entered the place and hit the victims with a katana.

Fabiano Mai was arrested on the spot and taken in serious condition to a hospital in the neighboring city of Pinhalzinho, after trying to commit suicide by stabbing himself with the katana.

While initial statements from the local police chief described the weapon as a katana, police forensic reports later clarified that the weapon used was a commercially sold 50 cm "Red Guardian" tactical fantasy short sword. In addition to the short sword, the attacker carried a set of firecrackers intended to create panic during the attack.

== Legal proceedings ==
On 14 May 2021, following a week of investigation, the Civil Police of Brazil declared his motive as a "general hatred" against humans. It was also discovered that he tried to buy firearms in different ways before acquiring his melee weapon, five days before the crime. On 21 May, the Public Prosecutor's Office of Santa Catarina indicted Mai for 5 homicides and one attempted homicide with the aggravating circumstance of a triple-qualified crime: A vile motive, use of a resource that made it impossible for the victims to defend themselves, and usage of cruel means.

On 25 November 2021, whilst being held in custody at the Chapecó Regional Prison awaiting trial and sentencing, Judge Caio Lemgruber Taborda signed an order for the transfer of Fabiano to the Hospital de Custódia, in Florianópolis. The decision was taken based on the official expert's report, which found that Fabiano suffers from undifferentiated schizophrenia and needs immediate treatment. The court also questioned whether the prison had the ability to treat his condition. However, a previous report found that Kipper Mai had full mental capacity to understand the criminal nature of his act.

On 10 August 2023, Fabiano Kipper Mai was sentenced to 329 years and 4 months in prison. The presiding judge also ruled that Fabiano should pay each of his victims including those killed, the injured child and 14 others for attempted murder.

== Victims ==
- Keli Adriane Aniecevski, 30 years old, teacher;
- Mirla Amanda Renner Costa, 20 years old, educational agent;
- Sarah Luiza Mahle Sehn, 19 months old
- Murilo Massing, 21 months old
- Anna Bela Fernandes de Barros, 20 months old

Another 20-month-old boy named Henrique Hübler was also injured and had to undergo surgery and stay in the ICU.

=== School staff ===
Deputy Jerônimo Ferreira, who is handling the case, says that the teacher and the educational agent were heroes in containing the youth from going to other classrooms and even though they were injured, they managed to successfully avoid the worst:

He tried to enter every room and couldn't. Those women managed to prevent a greater evil from happening, they were very brave.

— Deputy Jerônimo Ferreira

We have two heroines, may God receive them along with these three children. Strength and resilience to the families, I wish everyone that they can get through this sad time in their lives.

— Governor of Santa Catarina Daniela Reinehr

Aline Biazebetti, a 27-year old educational agent and a neighbor of the school, rescued one of the children. When she heard the commotion, she entered the school while the aggressor was still there, removed a one-and-a-half-year old child, got into a car and drove to the hospital. The child in question underwent surgery and is recovering from his injuries. Without Aline's quick action, the one-year-old could have been dead before the rescue arrived.

...I managed to call the police and picked up one of the children. I got in the car and took him to the hospital. I heard that he had surgery and is fine....

— Educational agent Aline Biazebetti

I will never forget the look that child gave me, as a way of asking for help...

— Educational agent Aline Biazebetti

== Official mourning ==
The state governor, Daniela Reinehr, announced official mourning on her Twitter. "I decree official mourning of three days in the state after the tragedy in Saudades, where children and teachers of a center for early childhood education died. I express deep sadness and provide my solidarity. I have determined that the government will provide all necessary support to the families," she wrote.

== See also ==
- Suzano school shooting
- Janaúba massacre
- Rio de Janeiro school shooting
- Goyases School shooting
- Campinas Cathedral shooting
- Blumenau school attack
