= 2022 Barreiras school attack =

2022 school shooting in Brazil

- Location: Barreiras, Bahia, Brazil
- Date: 26 September 2022; 7:00 a.m.
- Attack type: School shooting, school stabbing
- Weapons: .38-caliber revolver; Machete; Folding knife (unused); Improvised explosive device (unused)
- Deaths: 1
- Injuries: 1 (the perpetrator)
- Perpetrator: I.S.C.
- Motive: Far-right ideology

The Eurides Sant'Anna Municipal School shooting was a school attack that occurred on 26 September 2022 in Barreiras, Bahia, Brazil, when a 14-year-old student, officially identified by his initials as I.S.C., stormed his school and killed a student with a revolver and machete before being seriously injured by police officers.

== Attack ==
Around 5:00 a.m., a 14-year-old student at Eurides Sant'Anna Municipal School left his home and headed to the school, where he waited for hours until school began. He waited outside the school. Around 7:00 a.m., the shooter removed a coat from his backpack, which he would use for the attack. He was dressed in dark clothing, glasses, and a hood.

Ten minutes later, he opened fire. He attempted to hit the doorman, but the gun misfired, causing students arriving at the school to flee. During the escape, a resident filmed the moment students began to flee. A school guard who noticed the shooter ran to call for help, and 40 of the 400 students attending the morning class were present, many of them in the gymnasium.

After the first shot, students and teachers inside the school immediately ran to their classrooms to barricade themselves in and prevent the shooter from entering.

Students unable to hide in their classrooms fled and tried to take cover in the school's courtyard, but the instructor ordered the students to leave and go through the back of the school, where they managed to escape.

During the students' escape, Geane da Silva Brito, a 19-year-old student in a wheelchair, ended up behind. Even though Silva was not the target of the attack, the shooter took advantage of her lack of mobility before beginning to attack her. Silva was shot until the shooter ran out of ammunition and then stabbed her, dying at the scene.

When police arrived at the school, the shooter resisted, according to a school employee. This prompted one of them to fire a shot and hit the armed student. Two military police officers were later identified as the ones who fired the shots that seriously injured the shooter. The first police officer was a neighbor of the institution and the second was called by an employee.

== Perpetrator ==
Later, the shooter, the son of a police officer, was identified by his initials as I.S.C. as a 14-year-old student at the school that was attacked. He had an alleged plan to murder about 10 people and had an extremist account on X (formerly Twitter). He claimed to be an "enlightened" being and would be unleashed in "a bloody act."

In his 29-page manifesto, written by the shooter and posted on social media three days before the attack, he despised human life. One post read: "I lived with my father for most of my life, as my parents were separated and had no feelings for each other." "Since I was little, I felt superior to others, I harbored disgust and hatred for the groups I knew. I simply couldn't accept being in the same place as them. I felt I deserved more, or they deserved less. What mattered was being on top." He also praised far-right mass killers, including the perpetrators of the Christchurch mosque shootings and 2019 El Paso Walmart shooting. The shooter had been posting homophobic and xenophobic messages against Brazil's Northeast region since he had moved to Barreiras. The shooter posted his last post announcing the shooting at 3:22 a.m. that day. Shortly after the attack, the social network deleted the shooter's account, Hannya_88 or @TheAlgizGod.

The firearm used in the attack belonged to his father, who worked in Brasília and had recently moved to Barreiras. The revolver was stored under the mattress.

The student showed his face on social media, posted criticisms of his teachers, and expressed hatred to gain traction. He expressed sadness at his family's reaction to the attack. The student was followed by 186 users and had posted 103 times since September 2021.

One of the teachers at the attacked school described the shooter as an "introspective" and "quiet" student, who spoke little in class but was very dedicated to his activities.

Authorities launched an investigation, and it was discovered that the shooter had contact with another young man, Henrique Lira Trad, who also committed another attack at his former school in Vitória, Espírito Santo, via Discord, something the perpetrator had mentioned in his manifesto.

== Victim ==
Geane da Silva Brito (15 October 2003 – 26 September 2022), 19 at the time of the attack, was one of seven daughters of Luciene da Silva Brito and José Ferreira de Brito. Silva dreamed of becoming a police officer and had been studying at the school for four years. Silva's caregiver, Vitória Sales, described her as a dedicated, hard-working, and smiling student. In a video recorded of Silva at school, she revealed how much she valued her studies, said she had a positive relationship with her classmates, and that she liked the school because it was a place where "people couldn't do anything wrong." Silva and the shooter did not know each other. Silva was in the 9th grade and stood out among her classmates for her commitment to inclusion. She never missed classes and wanted to stay in school, even though her parents wanted to remove her because they had to walk her 26 kilometers to school.

Silva's parents gave interviews to newspapers. Ferreira commented: "I pray to the Lord that tragedies like this not happen in schools. I don't want to see my father suffer and feel the pain that I, as a father, and the family are feeling right now." Brito added: "If you stopped today and thought about a child in a wheelchair, and looked at the sparkle in their eyes, their smile. People, this is a mirror for each of us. I want this legacy to be left not just for me, as a mother, but for each of you."

== Aftermath ==
The shooter was treated by the Mobile Emergency Care Service (SAMU) after failing to respond to medical commands, but was able to breathe. He was taken to the General Hospital of the West, arriving around 8:10 a.m. after being shot in the shoulder, abdomen, and leg. He was in serious condition and underwent surgery. He was discharged and later underwent social-educational measures at home. The shooter became quadriplegic due to the severe injuries he suffered after being shot.

Da Silva Brito was buried in the Ilha da Liberdade community, and the burial took place later in the cemetery of the village of Cantinho do Senhor dos Aflitos. Students from several schools attended the wake, as well as representatives from the administrative board of the civic-military school.

On October 4th, classes at the Eurides Sant'Anna Municipal School resumed amid intense emotion. The day before, students held a service and a tribute to the victim killed in the attack. Parents of students, staff, and pastors attended the service.

One year after the attack, police officers maintained surveillance and security at the school. The school community held a service in the gymnasium in another tribute to the victim.

== Reactions ==
The Barreiras city government issued a statement after the attack: "We express our solidarity with the family of the victimized student, expressing our deepest condolences at this time of profound pain and consternation."

The Bahia State Department of Education (SEC) commented on the attack: "In this time of grief, the SEC expresses its solidarity with the family, friends, students, educators, and employees of the educational institution."

Governor ACM Neto, a candidate for Bahia governor, wrote on social media: "My condolences to the family and friends of the young student Jeane da Silva, who died today in an attack on a school in Barreiras. May God comfort them and may the school community, as well as the entire city, overcome this moment of grief."

== See also ==
- List of school attacks in Brazil
- Sigma School shooting and Heliópolis school shooting - other school shootings which have taken place in Bahia, Brazil
- Vitória school attack - school attack whose perpetrator was in direct contact with I.S.C.
- Izhevsk school shooting - Another school shooting that happened the same day in Russia
