= Sapopemba State School shooting =

School shooting in Brazil

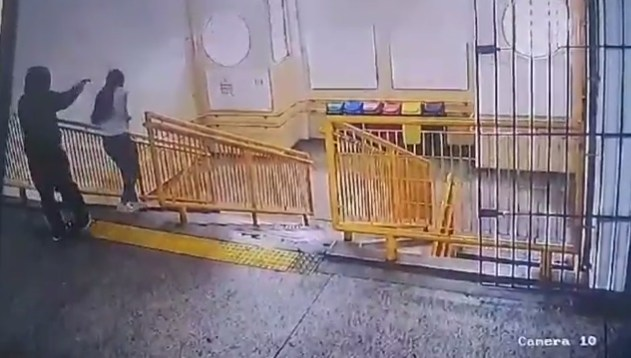
- Shooter caught on surveillance moments before shooting the victim in the back of the head
- Location: Sapopemba State School, Sapopemba, São Paulo, Brazil
- Date: 23 October 2023 c. 7:20 a.m.
- Attack type: School shooting
- Weapon: .38-caliber Rossi revolver
- Deaths: 1
- Injuries: 3 (2 by gunfire)
- Perpetrator: Lucas de Oliveira Tuci
- Motive: Retaliation for homophobic bullying

The Sapopemba State School shooting was a school shooting that occurred at the Sapopemba State School (Escola Estadual de Sapopemba) in the aforementioned neighbourhood of São Paulo, Brazil, on 23 October 2023. At about 7:30 in the morning, the gunman, a 16-year-old male student wearing his school uniform, shot three female students, one fatally. A fourth student sustained injures to his hand while attempting to escape from the school. The suspect then handed his revolver to a teacher before surrendering to the police.

== Shooting ==
On the morning of 23 October, a 16-year-old teenager entered the Sapopemba State School, in the Sapopemba neighborhood, São Paulo, in the east zone of the city, armed with a .38 caliber revolver, and shot three girls. One of them, Giovanna Bezerra Silva, 17 years old, was shot in the back of the head and died in hospital. Another three people were injured, one while fleeing the scene. The teenager handed himself in to the Military Police after the attack.

== Perpetrator ==
The perpetrator, a 16-year-old student, had taken the gun from his father, Marcos Tuci, who had bought it legally in 1994 for self-defense, as his workplace had often been the subject of robberies. When strict gun control was implemented in Brazil, he never re-registered or turned in his firearm. He was charged with illegal possession of a firearm.

The attack was later to be revealed to be retaliation for homophobic bullying he had suffered at the school, as the perpetrator was gay and would broadcast himself crossdressing online. Two weeks before the attack, he threatened to shoot up the school, but none of the school student's reported this comment.

== Aftermath ==
Upon seizing the teenager's phone, it was found he broadcast hate symbols (including references to Nazism) online, and openly wrote about the planning of his attack on Discord and Telegram. He was also found to be in possession of child pornography.

The perpetrator was sentenced to up to three years' preventative detention, the harshest criminal penalty available for minors in Brazil.

== See also ==
- List of attacks related to secondary schools
- List of school attacks in Brazil
