= Campinas school shooting =

Brazilian shooting

- Campinas (Brazil)
- Location: 22.986638°N 47.118944°E; State First Grade School Núcleo Habitacional Vida Nova, Campinas, São Paulo, Brazil
- Date: 6 August 1999; 27 years ago 9:00 p.m. (UTC-3)
- Target: Students of the State First Grade School Núcleo Habitacional Vida Nova
- Attack type: Mass shooting, school shooting
- Weapon: .38-caliber revolvers
- Deaths: 3
- Injuries: 7
- Perpetrators: Cléber Teixeira; Edmilson Fagundes de Souza Santos; Third unidentified shooter; Fourth unidentified shooter
- No. of participants: 4
- Motive: Invasion of one of the fatal victims in a shack

The Campinas school shooting was a school shooting that occurred in the municipality of Campinas. Four armed men invaded the school and shot nine students and beat a tenth, killing three of them, before fleeing. It was the deadliest school shooting in Brazil until it was surpassed by the Rio de Janeiro school shooting in 2011. This crime was also the deadliest in São Paulo, until it was surpassed by the Suzano massacre, 2019.

== Shooting ==
At around 9pm, one of the shooters arrived at Portuguese: Escola Estadual de Primeiro Grau Núcleo Habitacional Vida Nova, lit. 'State First Grade School Núcleo Habitacional Vida Nova', located in Campinas, São Paulo. The shooter asked the students for a glass of water before leaving. Ninety minutes later, he returned with three other shooters and went to the caretaker's house. They ordered the local students to lie down before firing shots at them, killing two and injuring six, in addition to beating another student. Upon hearing the shots, a female student checked what was happening and was murdered. After the shooting, the perpetrators fled.

== Victims ==
Three students, two boys and one girl had fatal injuries, another seven students were injured, six by gunshots, including two in serious state and a seventh by beating. The victims were identified as:

=== Fatal victims ===
- Leonardo Pereira Souza Barbosa, 19
- Márcia Ramos Oliveira, 15
- José Eduardo Alves, 14

=== Injured Victims ===
- Gilmar Antunes Lima, 22
- Luciano Aparecido Santos, 20
- Roberto Waldalecir Alves, 18
- Arles Éder dos Santos, 18
- Gilberto Silva Francisco, 16
- F., 15 (male student)
- Dayane Pereira de Oliveira, 15

== Aftermath ==
Authorities initially investigated the reason for the attack. One of the hypotheses was that one of the dead students had broken into a shack owned by one of the shooters prior to the attack. The school was closed until the 11th, five days after the attack that left three students dead. In November, one of the shooters, Cléber Teixeira, 21, was arrested and in 2001, sentenced to 51 years in prison. So far, the other three shooters have not been found, but one of them has been identified as Edmilson Fagundes de Souza Santos, 19.
