= Arroio dos Ratos =

Municipality of Rio Grande do Sul, Brazil

- Municipality
- O Município de Arroio dos Ratos; The Municipality of Arroio dos Ratos
- Flag Coat of arms

- Location within Rio Grande do Sul

- Location in Brazil
- Coordinates: 30°04′37″S 51°43′44″W
- Country: Brazil
- State: Rio Grande do Sul
- Mesoregion: Metropolitana de Porto Alegre
- Microregion: Porto Alegre
- Founded: 28 December 1964

Government
  - Mayor: Luciano Leites Rocha (PSB)

Area
  - Total: 425.210 km^{2} (164.174 sq mi)
- Elevation: 69 m (226 ft)

Population (2020)
  - Total: 14,177
  - Density: 33.341/km^{2} (86.353/sq mi)
- Demonym: arroio-ratenses or ratenses
- Time zone: UTC−3 (BRT)
- Postal Code: 96740-000
- Area code: +55 51
- Website: Arroio dos Ratos, Rio Grande do Sul

Arroio dos Ratos is a municipality in the Brazilian state of Rio Grande do Sul. Thanks to its soil, is nationally known as the National Cradle of the Coal industry. The city is also known as the National Capital of the Watermelon.

== See also ==
- List of municipalities in Rio Grande do Sul
