= Dogolachan =

Brazilian far-right imageboard

- Available in: Portuguese
- Founded: 2013
- Country of origin: Brazil
- Founders: Emerson Eduardo Rodrigues; Marcelo Valle Silveira Mello
- Registration: None
- Written in: PHP

Dogolachan is a Brazilian anonymous imageboard. The website was originally founded in 2013 by Internet criminals Marcelo Valle Silveira Mello and Emerson Eduardo Rodrigues. It was moved to the darknet after Mello's arrest in 2018.

The forum has been employed by a number of its users, including Mello, as a vessel of attacks against minorities, feminists activists, and journalists. In June 2018, a moderator of the website, known online as Kyo, killed a woman in a suicide attack in Penápolis, São Paulo, after being encouraged by another user. A number of harassment campaigns were carried out by the website against politically-involved people known for being hostile to Mello and Rodrigues, such as Argentinian feminist blogger Lola Aronovich, Brazilian politician Jean Wyllys, and right-wing lawyer Janaína Paschoal.

The forum remained operational until Mello was arrested by Federal Police in 2018 for a number of internet crimes, after which Rodrigues exiled himself to Spain. Mello was sentenced to 41 years in prison later that year, both him and Rodrigues had been previously convicted of internet crimes in 2012. A subsequent iteration of Dogolachan was soon founded by an anonymous person known only as "DPR", and the forum was later moved to the TOR network.

== Reception ==
Dogolachan has been described as one of the most prominent hate forums in Brazil. The website was named after a Russian dog known online as Dogola, which became one of the first internet memes in Brazil. Its users have frequently opposed feminist ideology, LGBT rights, and political correctness.
