= São Paulo school stabbing =

2023 mass stabbing in Brazil

Attack on Thomazia Montoro State School
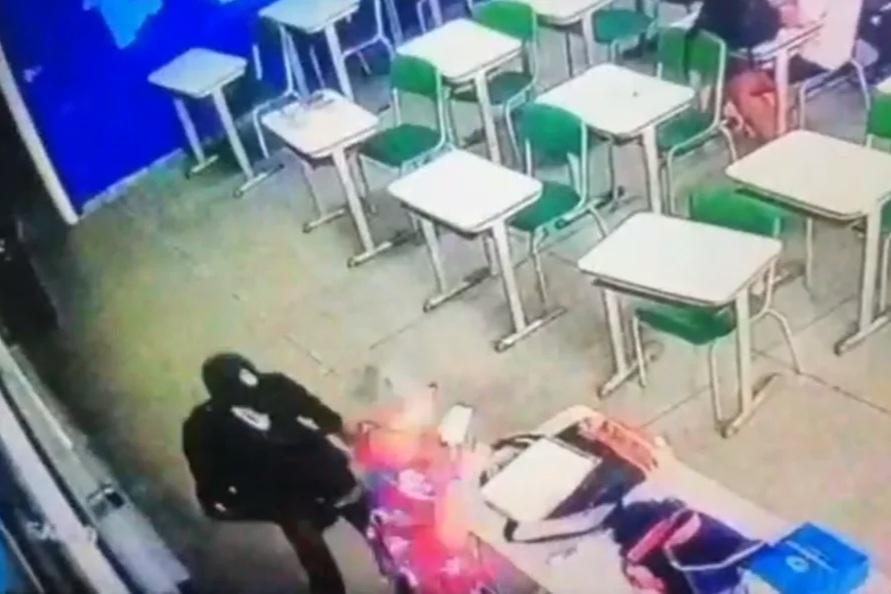
- Moments before a teacher was stabbed to death inside a school in São Paulo.
- Native name: Ataque à Escola Estadual Thomazia Montoro
- Location: Vila Sônia, São Paulo, Brazil
- Date: 27 March 2023; ~07:20 (UTC−03:00)
- Target: Teachers and students
- Attack type: School stabbing, mass stabbing
- Weapon: Kitchen knife
- Deaths: 1
- Injuries: 5
- Perpetrators: 13-year-old male student
- Motive: Undisclosed

The attack on Thomazia Montoro State School (Portuguese: Ataque à Escola Estadual Thomazia Montoro) or nationally known as São Paulo school stabbing (Portuguese: Esfaqueamento em escola de São Paulo) was a school stabbing that occurred on 27 March 2023 at the Thomazia Montoro State School in the Vila Sônia district of São Paulo, Brazil. A 13-year-old male student attacked teachers and classmates with a kitchen knife, killing one teacher, 71-year-old Elisabeth Tenreiro, and injuring five others.

The attacker was detained by police shortly after the incident. Authorities reported that the motive remained under investigation. The attack prompted widespread public debate in Brazil regarding school safety, bullying, and the spread of violent online content.

== Background ==
Thomazia Montoro State School is a public secondary school located in the Vila Sônia neighborhood in the western zone of São Paulo. It serves hundreds of students aged between 11 and 17. Prior to the attack, there were no official reports of violent incidents at the school. According to early statements, the perpetrator had allegedly been involved in conflicts with classmates and had a history of behavioral issues. He had a history of being bullied and began to prepare the attack since he was 11.

== Attack ==
At around 07:20 local time, the student entered his classroom armed with a kitchen knife and began attacking teachers and fellow students. Witnesses reported that he first targeted his teacher, Elisabeth Tenreiro, before turning on other staff and pupils who tried to intervene. Several students managed to flee and alert security. The police arrived shortly after and apprehended the attacker within the school premises.

== Victims ==
The primary victim, Elisabeth Tenreiro, a 71-year-old science teacher, succumbed to her injuries at a nearby hospital. Five other individuals—three teachers and two students—were injured, with at least one sustaining serious wounds but surviving.

== Investigation ==
Authorities stated that the perpetrator was a 13-year-old student enrolled at the school. Due to his age, his identity was not released to the public. Investigators examined whether the attack had been influenced by online extremist or violent groups, as officials noted recent increases in similar incidents across Brazil.

== Reactions ==
The attack generated national shock and condemnation. Tarcísio de Freitas, the governor of São Paulo, announced measures to increase security in public schools, including the presence of counselors and police officers. UNESCO released a statement expressing regret over the killing and called for the promotion of peace and nonviolence in schools.

== See also ==
- List of school attacks in Brazil
- List of mass stabbing incidents (2020–present)
- Sapopemba State School shooting - Another school attack which occurred in the same city
