= Charqueadas =

Municipality of Rio Grande do Sul, Brazil

- Municipality
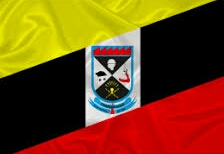
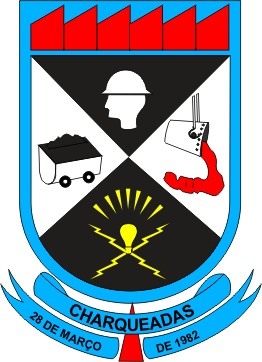
- Flag Coat of arms

- Location within Rio Grande do Sul

- Location in Brazil
- Coordinates: 29°58′S 51°38′W
- Country: Brazil
- State: Rio Grande do Sul

Government
  - Mayor: Ricardo Machado Vargas (2021-Present)

Population (2020)
  - Total: 41,258
- Time zone: UTC−3 (BRT)
- Postal code: 96745-000
- Area/distance code: 51
- Website: charqueadas.rs.gov.br

Charqueadas is a municipality in the state of Rio Grande do Sul, Brazil. It is located on the southern side of the Jacuí River, in the eastern-central part of the state. The city is 57 km (35 mi) west of the state capital and most populous city, Porto Alegre, and belongs to its metropolitan area. The area of the municipality is 214.80 km^{2} (82.93 sq mi), and it have a population of 41,258 (2020 estimate, IBGE), making it the largest municipality by population in the region. It borders to the south Arroio dos Ratos, to the north Triunfo, to the east Eldorado do Sul and to the west São Jerônimo.

== See also ==
- List of municipalities in Rio Grande do Sul
