= Saudades, Santa Catarina =

Coordinates: 26.9242°S 53.0031°W

- Municipality
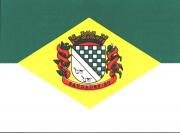
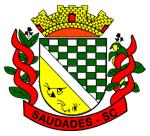
- Flag Coat of arms

- Saudades Municipality in Santa Catarina
- Country: Brazil
- Region: South
- State: Santa Catarina
- Mesoregion: Oeste Catarinense

Population (2020)
  - Total: 9,810
- Time zone: UTC -3

Saudades, Santa Catarina is a municipality in the state of Santa Catarina in the South region of Brazil. It was created in 1961, its area being taken from the existing municipality of São Carlos; in 1964 its eastern district was removed to form the new municipality of Nova Erechim.

On May 4, 2021, Fabiano Kipper Mai carried out a mass stabbing, killing five people. He attempted suicide but survived and was subsequently sentenced to 329 years in prison.

== See also ==
- List of municipalities in Santa Catarina
