= Cambé =

- Municipality
- Flag Coat of arms

- Location in Brazil
- Coordinates: 23°16′33″S 51°16′40″W
- Country: Brazil
- Region: Southern
- State: Paraná
- Mesoregion: Norte Central Paranaense

Area
  - Total: 191.265 sq mi (495.375 km^{2})
- Elevation: 2,230 ft (680 m)

Population (2022 Census)
  - Total: 107,208
  - Estimate (2025): 110,923
  - Density: 560.520/sq mi (216.418/km^{2})
- Time zone: UTC -3
- Climate: Cfa

Cambé is a municipality in the state of Paraná located in the Southern Region of Brazil.

== See also ==
- List of municipalities in Paraná
