= Suzano massacre =

School shooting in Suzano, São Paulo, Brazil

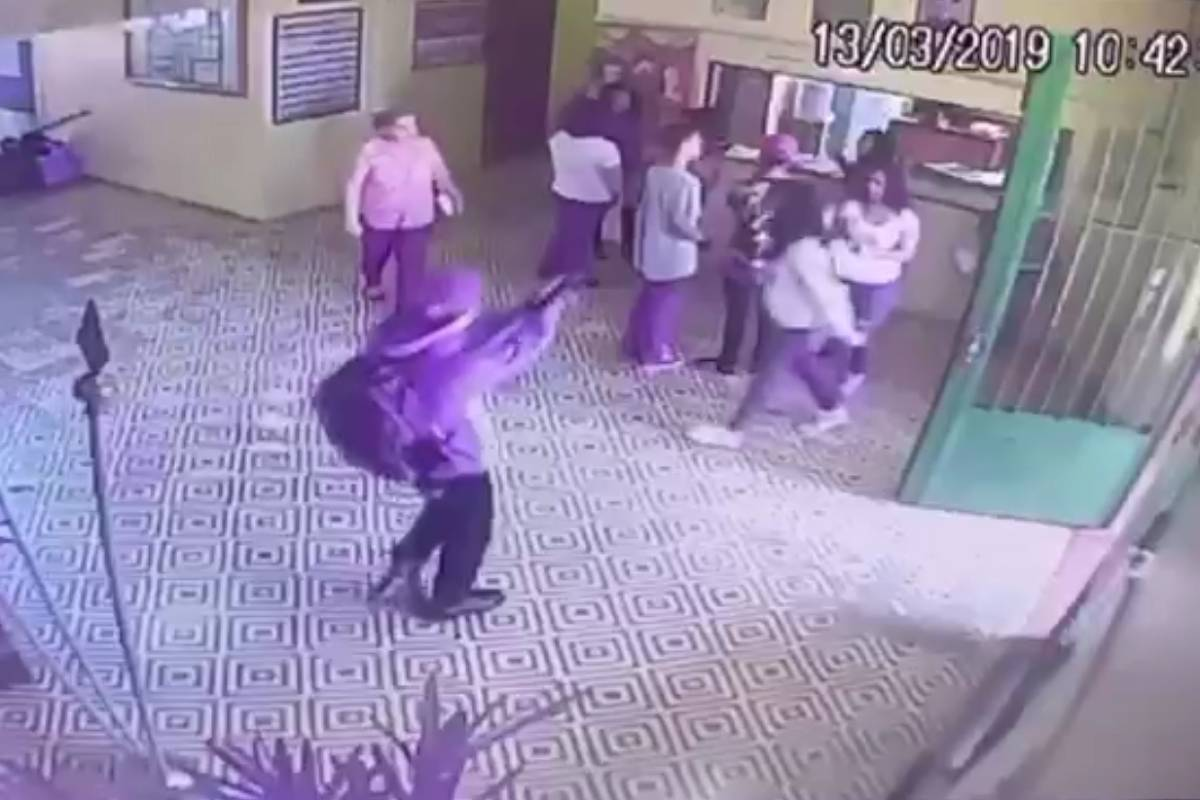
- CCTV still of Taucci before opening fire on a group of students

- Location: 23.5344°S 46.3155°W; Jorginho Veículos; Escola Estadual Professor Raul Brasil, Suzano, São Paulo, Brazil
- Date: 13 March 2019; 7 years ago c. 9:30 a.m. (BRT (UTC−03:00))
- Target: Jorge Antônio de Moraes; Students and staff at Professor Raul Brasil State School
- Attack type: School shooting; mass shooting; mass Stabbing; spree killing; mass murder; murder–suicide; Avunculicide
- Weapons: 3-inch Taurus Model 85 .38-caliber revolver; Vixion Scorpion compound bow (unused); Man Kung MK-150A1PB crossbow (unused); Hatchets; Molotov cocktails (unused); Knife
- Deaths: 10 (9 at the school, including both perpetrators; and Taucci's uncle at his car dealership)
- Injuries: 11
- Perpetrators: Guilherme Taucci Monteiro; Luiz Henrique de Castro
- Motive: Retaliation for bullying; Far-right extremism; Family problems; Columbine High School massacre copycat crime
- Verdict: 45 days
- Convicted: Unnamed 17-year-old

On 13 March 2019, a school shooting took place at the Professor Raul Brasil State School in Suzano, São Paulo, Brazil. A pair of former students, 17-year old Guilherme Taucci Monteiro and 25-year-old Luiz Henrique de Castro, killed five students and two school staff members. Before committing the attack, Taucci had killed his uncle. After killing most of their victims in the school, Taucci then killed his own partner and committed suicide. Gunshots wounded 11 people.

The attack was the second major and second deadliest school shooting in Brazil, after the Rio de Janeiro school shooting in 2011, where 12 people were killed. It is also the ninth fatal school shooting in Brazilian history.

The shooting has inspired many copycat crimes in and outside of Brazil.

== Attack ==
At around 9:00 a.m. on Wednesday, 13 March 2019, Guilherme Taucci Monteiro shot his uncle Jorge Antônio de Moraes, inside Jorge's car dealership. Moraes was taken to the hospital but succumbed to his injuries, dying hours later. According to the investigation, Luiz Henrique de Castro was planning on killing a neighbor of his that was an electrician because they had had a misunderstanding months before. They had a pact, in which each one would kill someone before the school massacre. An hour and a half before the school attack, Henrique went to his neighbor's house. Finding the gate closed and locked, he persistently called him out, but the man did not answer and so Luiz went away.

On the same day, one of the killers posted a series of photos on a social media platform, where he appeared with a skull mask, holding the firearm he would later use and doing a gun sign with his hand against his head. The two attackers then drove to the school in a white Chevrolet Onix that Henrique had legally rented at Localiza.

The crime occurred at around 9:30 a.m. Guilherme Taucci Monteiro, 17 years old, and Luiz Henrique de Castro, 25 years old, entered the building hooded, with combat boots and balaclavas with skulls. Taucci entered the building first. He then turned around and began shooting at two school staff members as well as several students at a distance of approximately 3 feet (0.91 m) in front of him, before entering the main patio in search of more potential victims. He disappeared from the camera and then moved on to the institution's linguistics center.

By this time, Henrique appeared on camera entering the building in a hurry while holding several weapons, including a compound bow, which he eventually dropped on the floor and was unused in the attack. He approached the wounded victims lying on the ground and struck them with a hatchet, at which point fleeing students started to run from the patio towards the school entrance hall. On their way, he encountered Taucci, who was still in the entrance hall, at which point Henrique engaged in a fistfight with a female student before she fled. Other students who had hidden when they first heard gunshots were able to avoid being shot. Five students between 15 and 17 years old and two school staff members were killed.

According to the 2017 School Census, the institution had 358 students between 6th and 9th grade (middle school and freshman year) and 693 students in secondary school. The school was locked down by police, who searched it and found a .38 caliber revolver, speedloaders, a crossbow, a compound bow, Molotov cocktails, a hatchet and a wired bag. A bomb squad was dispatched to the scene and found that it was a fake explosive.

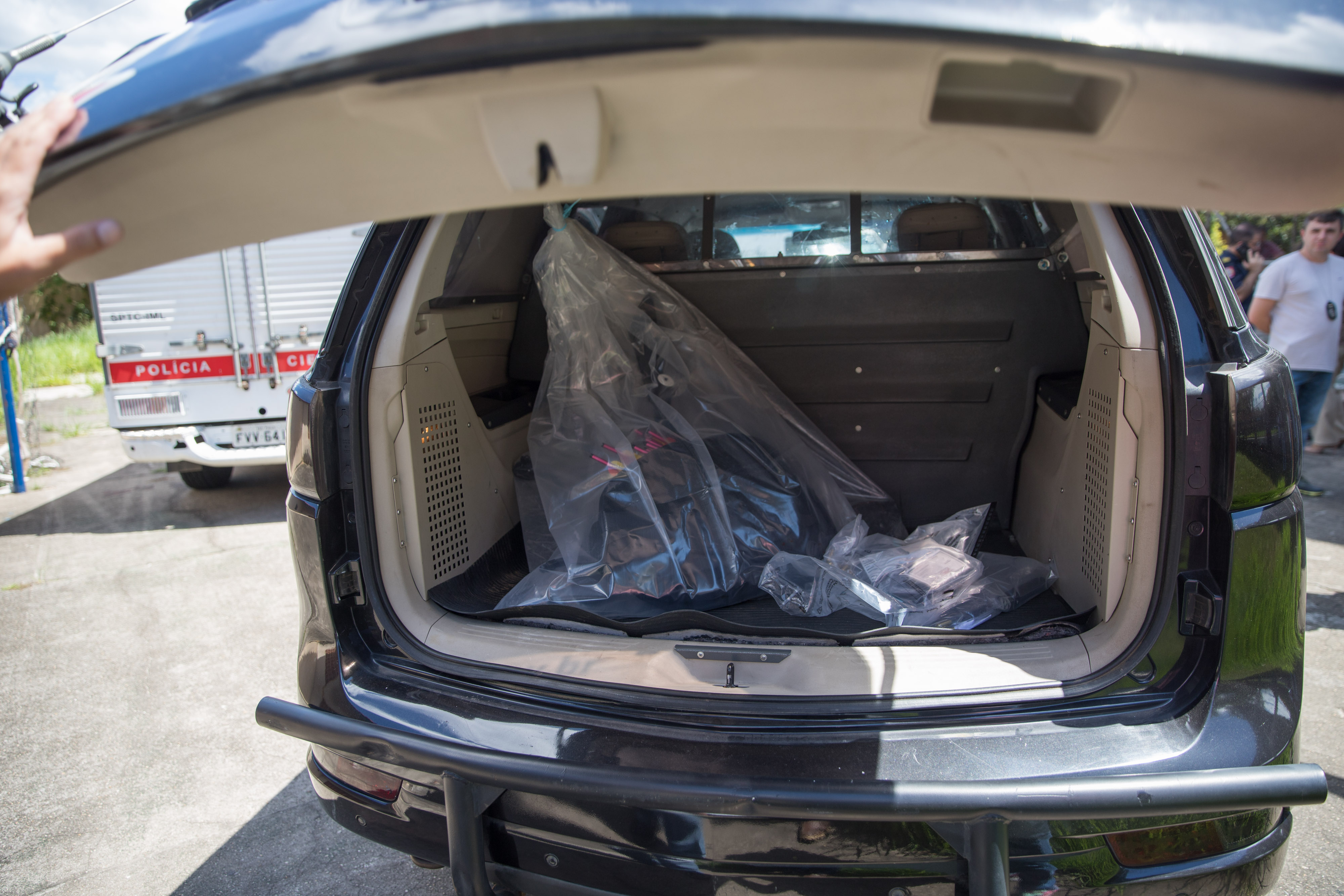
Weapons used by the killers during the attack.

== Perpetrators ==
Guilherme Taucci Monteiro (July 5, 2001 – March 13, 2019), then 17 years old, was an ex-student of the school and had dropped his studies due to bullying. He lived with his grandparents as his mother had addiction problems. Taucci liked goth culture and sympathized with Nazism. The father of Luiz Henrique, his best friend and with whom he attacked the school, had promised to get him a job in the same service of Square cleaning and conservation in São Paulo. According to his grandfather, Taucci went to a LAN house with Henrique and did not find it odd that he had money for games or online shopping, because his grandson did some odd jobs. The last one had been as a vendor in a hotdog stand, where he earned 600 reais (USD$114). With the death of his grandmother four months before the attack, Taucci started showing sign of clinical depression. Taucci and Henrique had met as children and remained close. Their days consisted of walking through the mall and regular visits to the neighborhood's LAN house, where they used to play first-person shooter games.

Luiz Henrique de Castro (March 16, 1993 – March 13, 2019), then 25 years old, was also an ex-student of the school. He lived with his parents, an older brother and his 80-year-old grandfather. According to his neighbors, he had a job gardening with a company in Eastern São Paulo. César Expedito, a friend of Henrique for 14 years, stated that he liked playing ball and video games, and that he never displayed any aggressive behavior. According to César, Henrique studied at Raul Brasil School for a year and then changed schools, never having been expelled and worked in Guaianases.

Guilherme Taucci Monteiro (left) and Luiz Henrique de Castro (right)

According to some reports, both perpetrators were influenced by Dogolachan, an imageboard, where every participant is anonymous (Luiz was known as luhkrcher666 and Guilherme as 1guY-55chaN). The forum is known for its condoning of terrorism and violence, with content filled with intolerance towards minorities and sexism. They had planned the attack for a year and, inspired by the Columbine High School massacre, they hoped the attack would draw more attention than the Columbine massacre. In a statement from Taucci's mother, Taucci had reportedly been bullied because of his acne. She also stated that he had been harassed by a fellow pupil. Henrique was described by his father as "weak-minded and would do what the other people wanted". A third suspect, not directly involved in the attack, stated that the perpetrators also intended to carry out rapes. The perpetrators were seen wearing clothing resembling those worn by the main characters in Elephant, a movie about a school shooting in which one of the two shooters kills the other at the movie's conclusion. They had bought the firearm used in the shooting from the black market, organizing the purchase via fake Facebook accounts.

The third suspect, a 17-year-old, was sentenced to spend 45 days in an institution. At the teenager's house, police found drawings of dead people, encrypted messages, and weapons very similar to the ones found in the two killers’ houses. A video showed Taucci and the third suspect going to a shooting range and training shots with airsoft guns and bow and arrow, five days before the attack. According to the Police, the teenager had also participated in buying the hatchet used to injure students and teachers. After arresting the teenager, the Suzano station considered that he was the intellectual author of the school attack, alongside Taucci, even though the reason why he did not participate in the attack is not known. The defense of the teenager contested the accusations.

== Victims ==
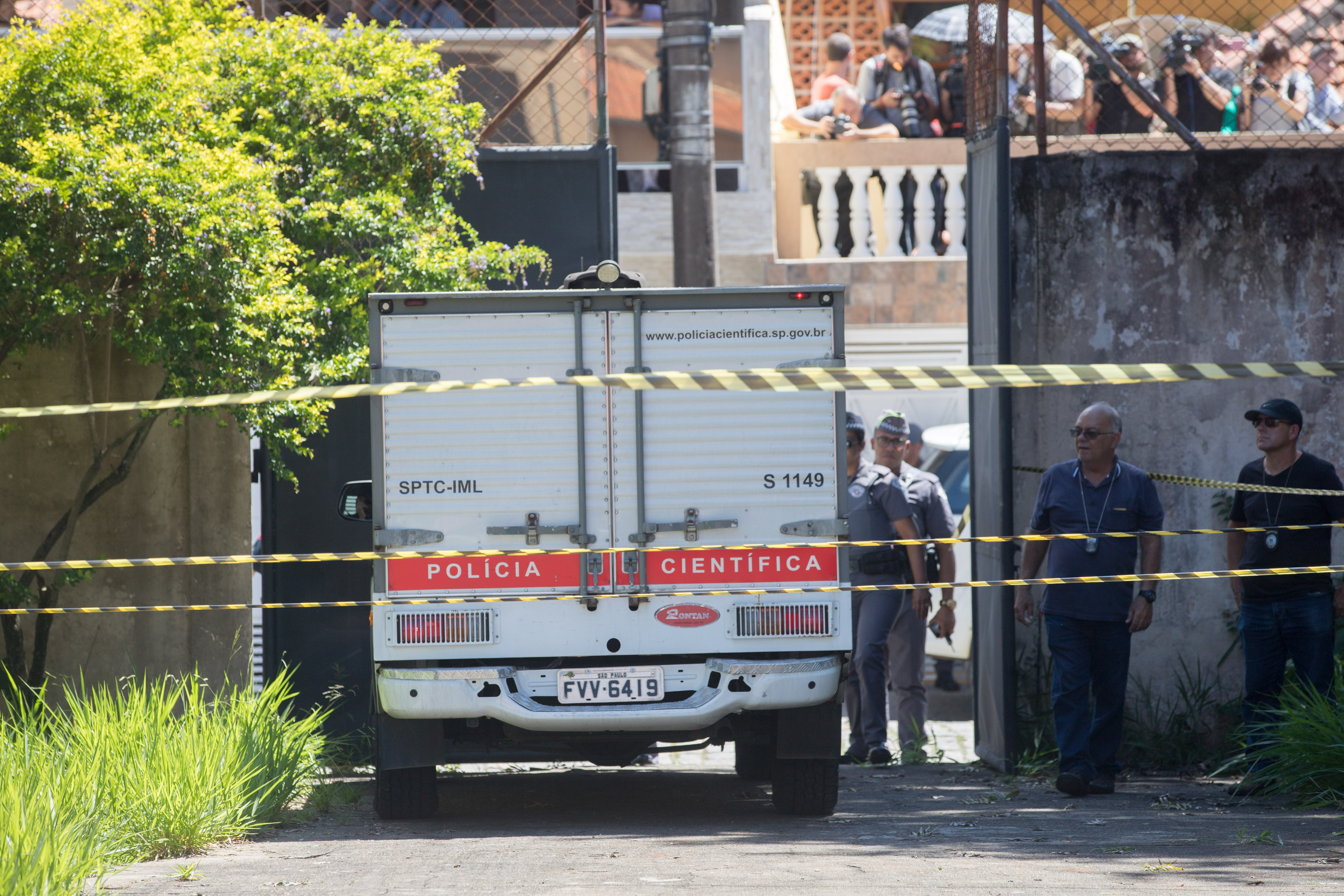
The coroner's hearse going into the attacked school.

Two of the victims were school staff members. The first victim to be shot was Marilena Ferreira Vieira Umezu, a pedagogical coordinator. The other was Eliana Regina de Oliveira Xavier, was an inspector (school organization agent). Five high school students were killed, their ages ranging from 15 to 17, four of whom died at the site and one en route to a hospital.

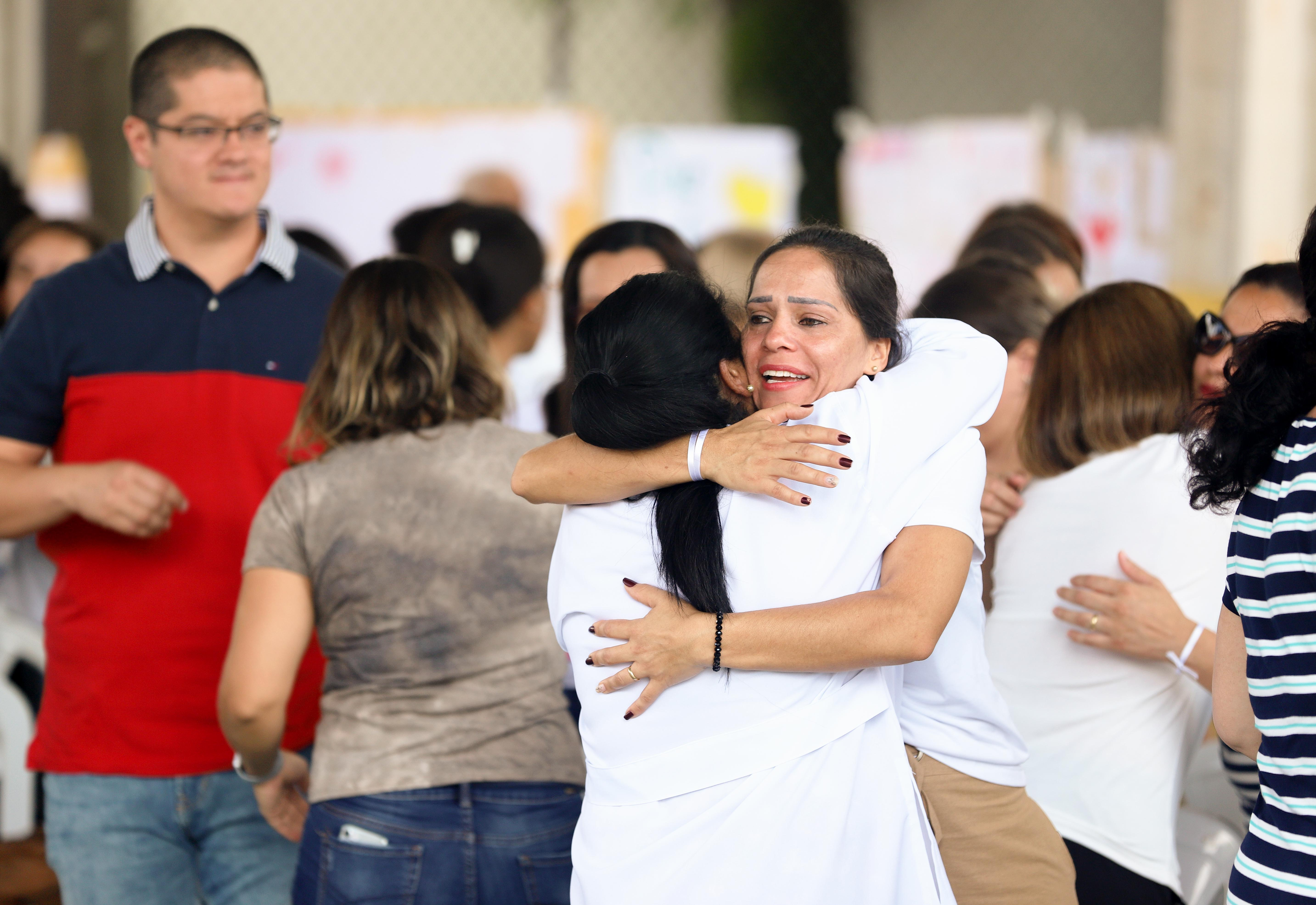
Ecumenical service after the attack

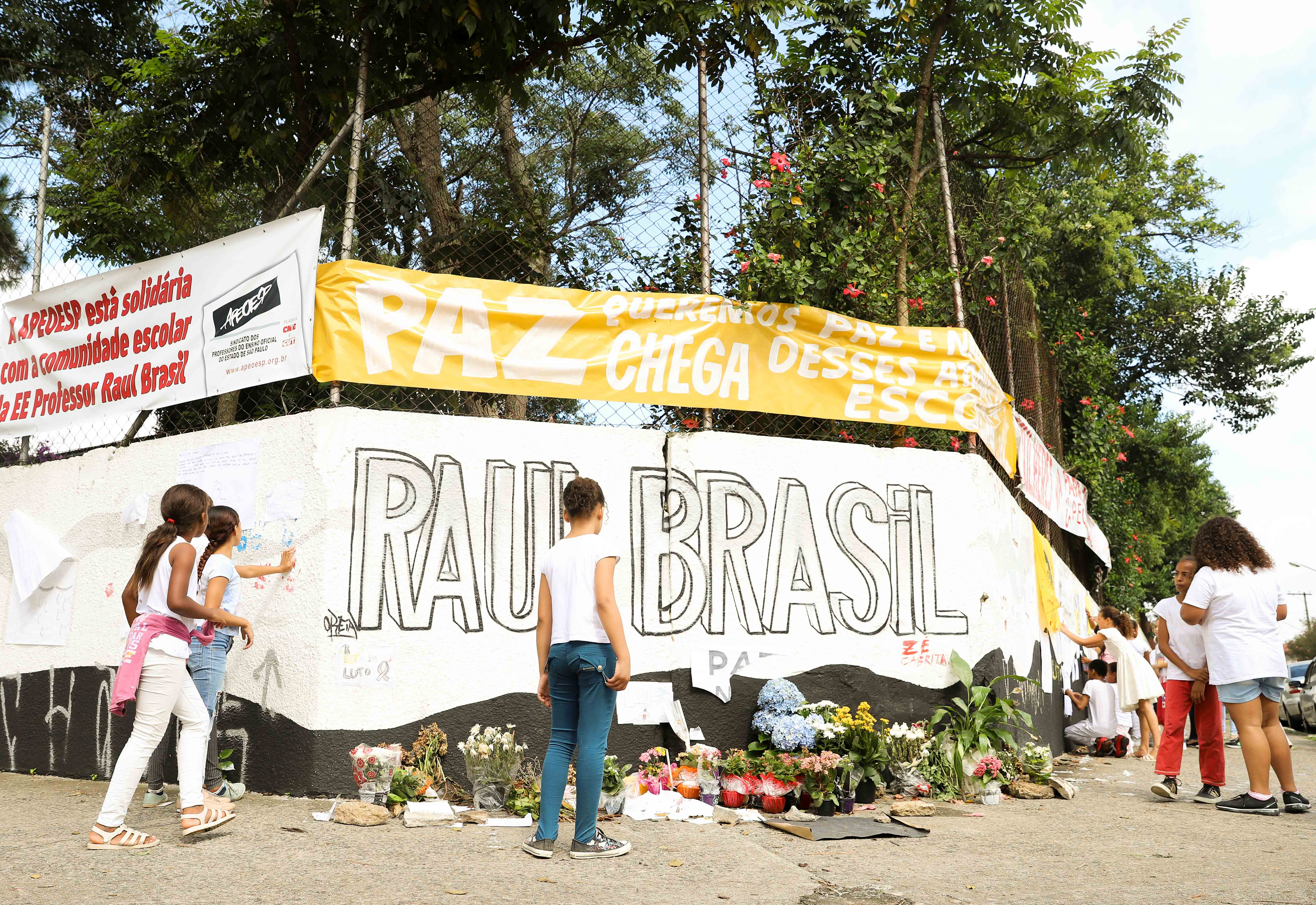
Memorial for the victims in front of the school

The attack also left eleven students wounded (who were taken to nearby hospitals). Two of these victims, who presented a more serious clinical condition, were transferred to Hospital das Clínicas in São Paulo. According to the police, Taucci, the youngest shooter, killed his partner Henrique and then committed suicide.

=== Deaths ===
Source: G1

Name	Age	Observations
Jorge Antônio de Moraes	51	Monteiro's uncle, killed by his nephew before the school attack.
Marilena Ferreira Vieira Umezu	59	Pedagogical coordinator
Eliana Regina de Oliveira Xavier	38	Inspector
Caio Oliveira	15	Students
Claiton Antônio Ribeiro	17	Students
Douglas Murilo Celestino	16	Students
Kaio Lucas da Costa Limeira	15	Students
Samuel Melquíades Silva	16	Students
Luiz Henrique de Castro	25	Shooter, killed by his partner Guilherme
Guilherme Taucci Monteiro	17	Shooter, committed suicide

== Reactions ==
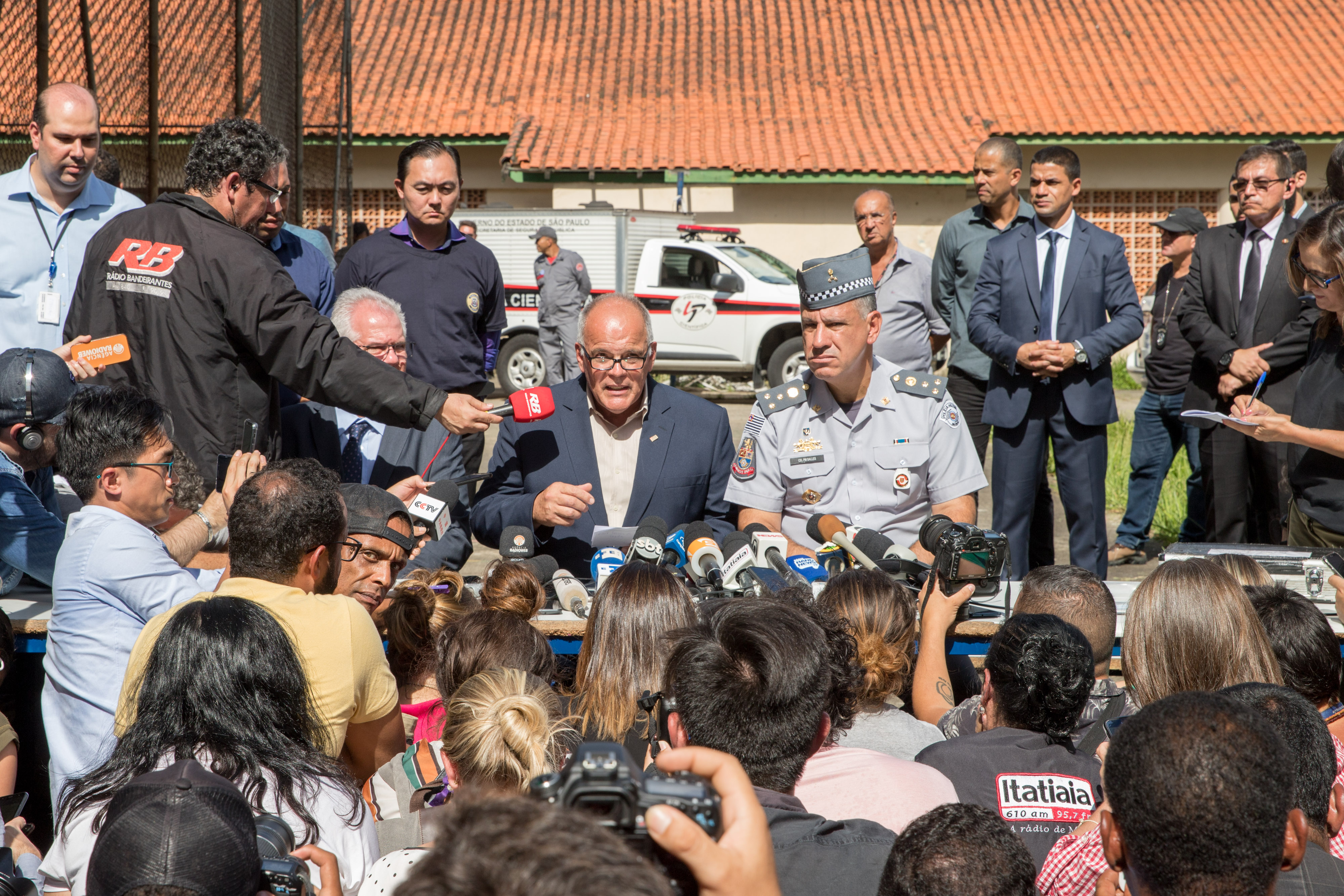
Public Security Secretaries participate in press conference at the Raul Brasil School

Many authorities, politicians, artists and other people expressed their condolences and commented on the tragedy. The attack was praised by neo-nazi groups, and Taucci's grave started being visited by admirers.

=== State government ===
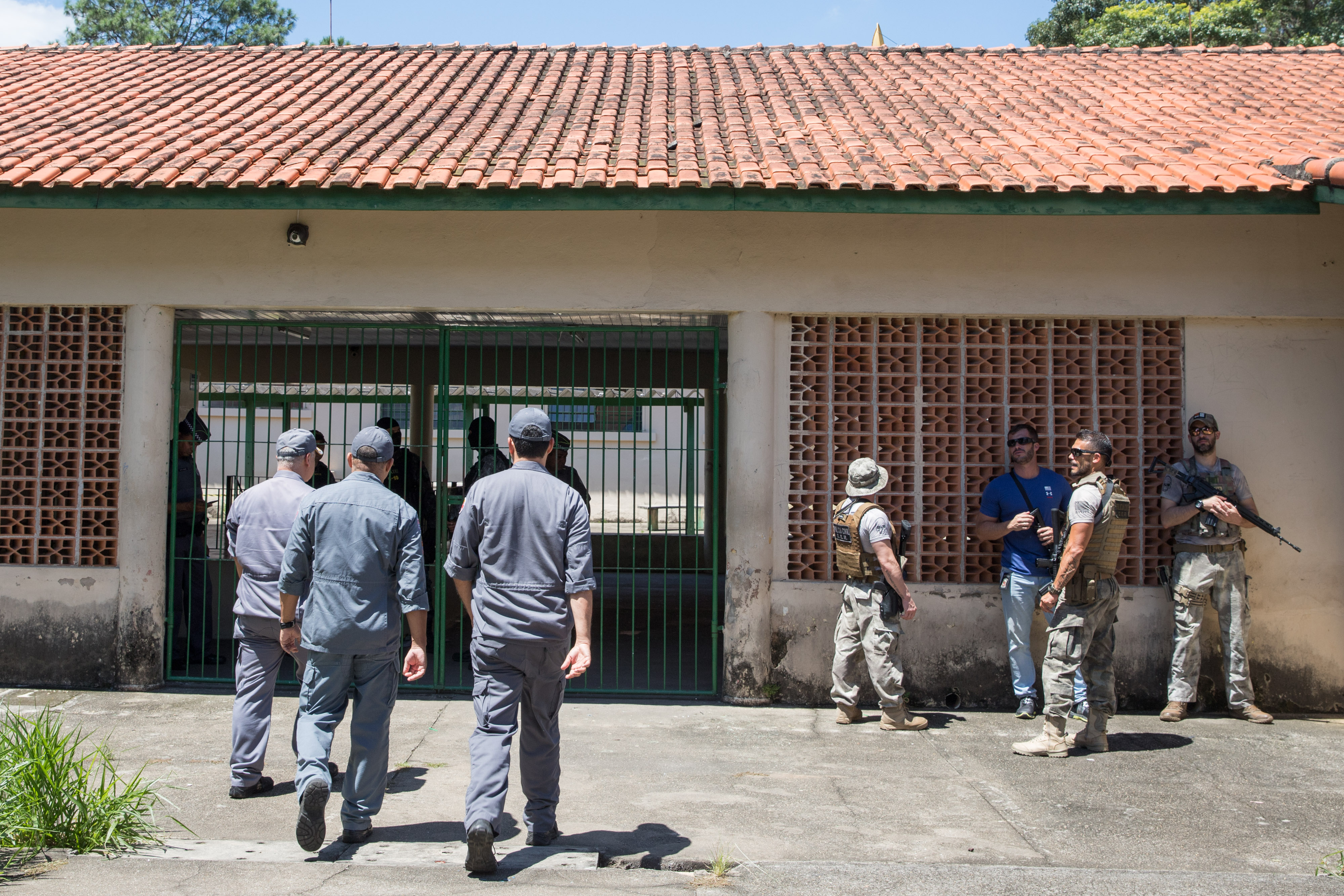
Police in front of the school

João Doria, governor of São Paulo, canceled his routine activities and flew to Suzano in a helicopter along with Rossieli Soares, the state's Secretary of Education; Colonel Salles, military police commander; and army general João Camilo Pires de Campos. Doria lamented the attack and decreed 3 days of mourning in the state.

=== Federal government ===
President Jair Bolsonaro lamented the tragedy and expressed his condolences to the victims' families on a tweet posted 6 hours after the tragedy. Ricardo Vélez Rodríguez, Minister of Education, expressed solidarity: "My condolences to the families. I express my contempt towards that demonstration of violence. I'll be closely following the investigation". Onyx Lorenzoni, Chief of Staff, also tweeted his condolences. Damares Alves, Minister of Women, Family and Human Rights, lamented the event and offered support by the Ministry.

=== Legislative power ===
Rodrigo Maia, President of the Chamber of Deputies, expressed his solidarity towards the families of victims and said that "it's time for Brazil to unite forces and competences to understand what happened and prevent new massacres like that one from occurring". Davi Alcolumbre, President of the Senate, expressed his condolences and tweeted: "I hope that the real causes behind that tragedy be discovered". As a result of the shooting, many congress members brought the question of gun control back into debate, with some criticizing the relaxation of gun laws.

São Paulo's federal congressman Júnior Bozella wanted to create a bill as a reaction to the tragedy, justifying that violent video games can lead the youth to commit "massive acts of violence". Júnior's proposal was criticized by several sectors, who considered as a "censorship setback" that could bring economic problems to Brazil.

=== Judicial power ===
Dias Toffoli, President of the Supreme Federal Court, read a note during an ordinary plenary section on March 13 in which he expressed his solidarity towards the families and friends of the victims and to society as a whole, which "is also a victim of that kind of tragedy". He also stated: "we can't let hatred enter our society".

=== Press ===
The tragedy was followed by Brazilian media and attracted attention of international media including BBC News, Le Figaro, Focus, El País and The Guardian. Part of the press reflected on the fact that President Bolsonaro did not publicly talk about the tragedy as soon as it was confirmed. The post on his social media came after state ministers and the vice-president Hamilton Mourão addressed it.

== Tribute ==
The lunch lady Silmara Silva de Moraes, that helped hide the students during the attack, received honors from the governor João Dória in 2020. In April 2021, she was the first education professional to be vaccinated against COVID-19.

== Copycat crimes ==
The Suzano massacre has become an inspiration for perpetrators of crimes such as stabbings and shootings in Latin America. The attack has been cited in connection with later incidents in Brazil and Mexico.

== See also ==
- 2019 in Brazil
- List of attacks related to secondary schools
- List of school massacres by death toll
- List of school shootings in Brazil
- True Crime Community
