= Education in Mexico =

Secretariat of Public Education
- Secretary of Education Deputy Secretary: Mario Delgado

National education budget (2019)
- Budget: MXN$807,305,000,000; USD$41 B

General details
- Primary languages: Spanish as the standard. However, there are courses available in English. Other minority languages are available in their local communities.
- System type: Federal
- Current system: September 25, 1921

Literacy (2012)
- Total: 95.1%
- Male: 96.2%
- Female: 94.2%

Enrollment
- Total: 36.5 million
- Primary: 18.5 million
- Secondary: 11.5 million
- Post secondary: 4.1 million

Attainment
- Secondary diploma: 44%^{1} (among 25–64 year-olds, 2022)
- Post-secondary diploma: 21% (among 25–64 year-olds, 2022)
- Sources: and the 2020 Census (INEGI)^{1} Only count upper secondary attainment, called educación media superior

Education in Mexico has a long history. Indigenous peoples in Central Mexico created institutions such as the telpochcalli and the calmecac before the Spanish conquest. The Royal and Pontifical University of Mexico, the second oldest university in the Americas, was founded by royal decree in 1551. Education in Mexico was, until the early twentieth century, largely confined to males from urban and wealthy segments and under the auspices of the Catholic Church.

The Mexican state has been directly involved in education since the nineteenth century, promoting secular education. Control of education was a source of an ongoing conflict between the Mexican state and the Catholic Church, which since the colonial era had exclusive charge of education. The mid-nineteenth-century Liberal Reform separated church and state, which had a direct impact on education. President Benito Juárez sought the expansion of public schools. During the long tenure of President Porfirio Díaz, the expansion of education became a priority under a cabinet-level post held by Justo Sierra; Sierra also served President Francisco I. Madero in the early years of the Mexican Revolution.

The 1917 Constitution strengthened the Mexican state's power in education. During the presidency of Álvaro Obregón in the early 1920s, his Minister of Public Education José Vasconcelos implemented a massive expansion of access to public, secular education and expanded access to secular schooling in rural areas. This work was built on and expanded in the administration of Plutarco Elías Calles by Moisés Sáenz. In the 1930s, the Mexican government under Lázaro Cárdenas mandated socialist education in Mexico and there was considerable push back from the Catholic Church. Socialist education was repealed during the 1940s, with the administration of Manuel Ávila Camacho. A number of private universities have opened since the mid-twentieth century. The Mexican Teachers' Union (SNTE), founded in the late 1940s, has had significant political power. The Mexican federal government has undertaken measures to reform education, which have been opposed by the SNTE.

Education in Mexico is currently regulated by the Secretariat of Public Education (Spanish: Secretaría de Educación Pública) (SEP). Education standards are set by this Ministry at all levels except in "autonomous" universities chartered by the government (e.g., Universidad Nacional Autónoma de México). Accreditation of private schools is accomplished by mandatory approval and registration with this institution. Religious instruction is prohibited in public schools; however, religious associations are free to maintain private schools, which receive no public funds. In the same fashion as other education systems, education has identifiable stages: primary school, junior high school (or "secondary school"), high school, higher education, and postgraduate education.

== Structure of the basic education system ==
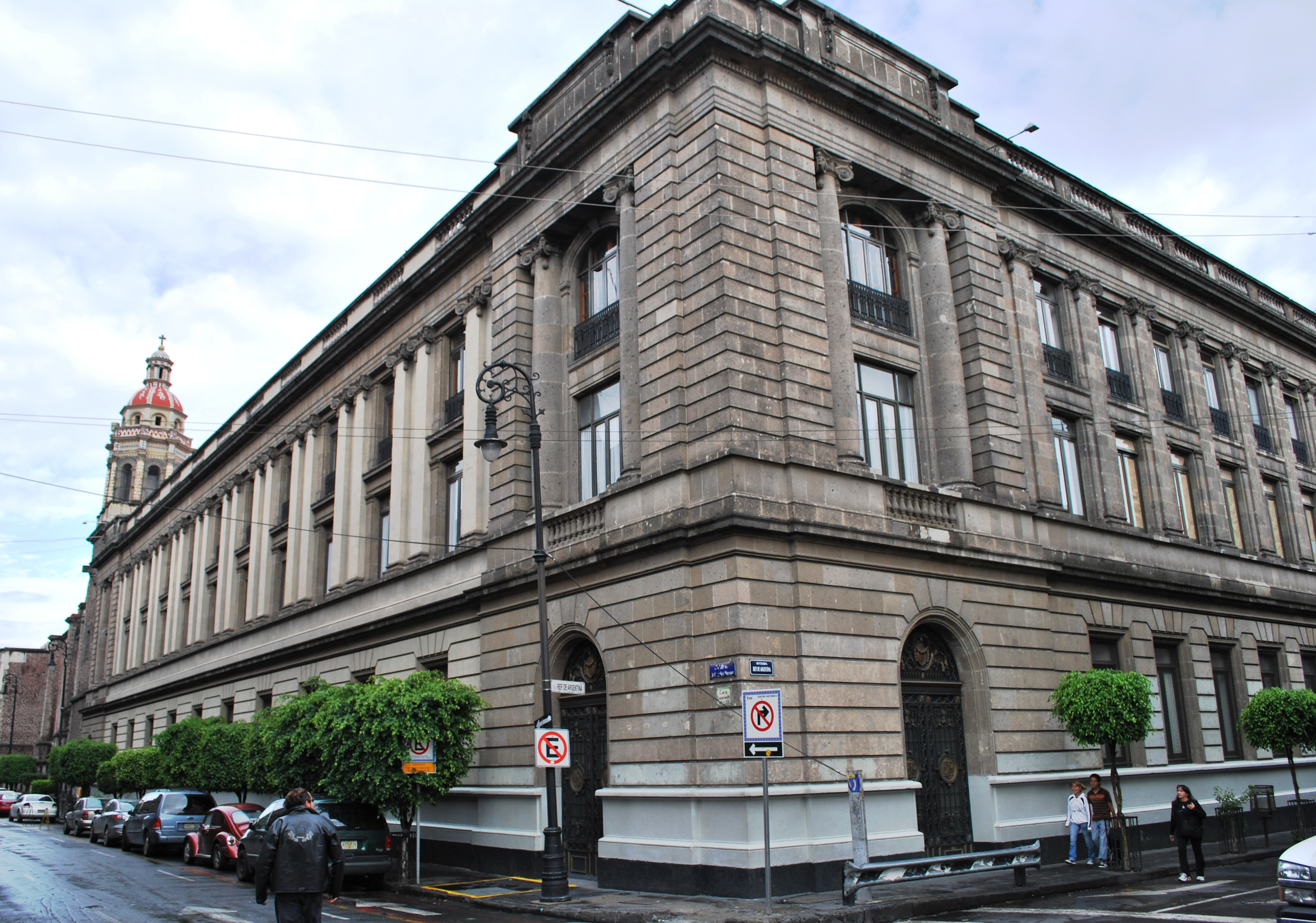
Outside of the Secretariat of Public Education (SEP) Headquarters building in Mexico City

In Mexico, basic education is normally divided into three steps: primary school (primaria), comprising grades 1–6; junior high school (secundaria), comprising grades 7-9; and high school (preparatoria), comprising grades 10-12.

Depending on definitions, primary education comprises primaria and secundaria, which are compulsory by law, while secondary education only includes preparatoria, which has recently been made compulsory.

=== Primary school ===
The terms "Primary School" or "Elementary School" usually corresponds to primaria, comprising grades 1–6, when the students are 6 to 12 years old. It starts the basic compulsory education system. These are the first years of schooling.

Depending on the school, bilingual education may be offered from the beginning, where half the day instruction is in Spanish, and the rest is in another language.

=== Junior high school ===
The terms "Junior High School" or "Middle School" usually correspond to secundaria, comprising grades 7–9 when the student's age is 12 to 15 years old. It is part of the basic compulsory education system, following primary school and coming before "high school" (preparatoria).

At this level, more specialized subjects may be taught such as Physics, Chemistry, and World History. There is also the técnica which provides vocational training, and the telesecundaria which provides distance learning.

Despite the similarities of the words "Secondary school" and secundaria, in Mexico the former is usually translated to preparatoria, while in other countries, such as Puerto Rico, or within the Spanish-speaking populations of the United States, the term secundaria refers to university.

=== High school ===
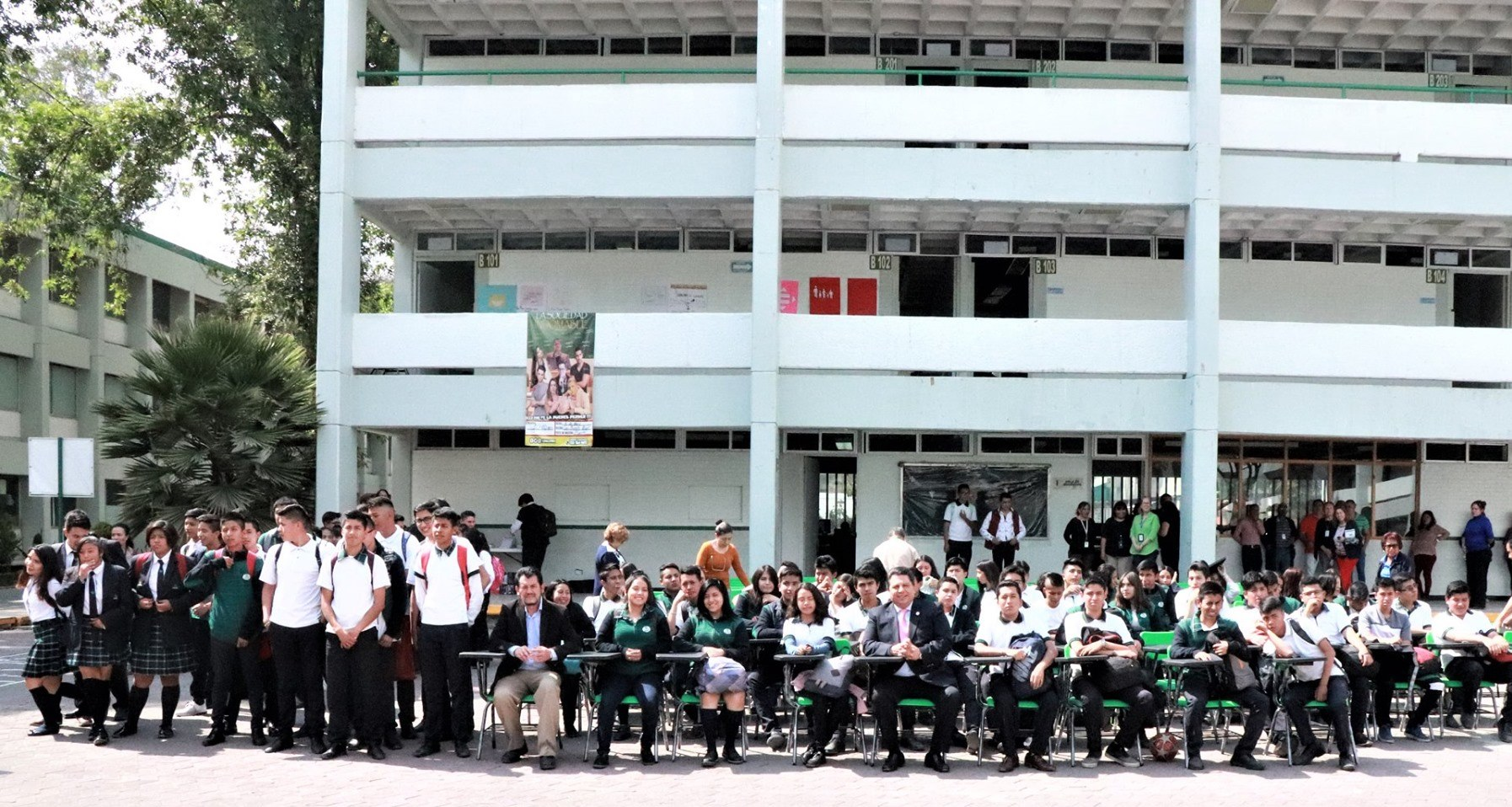
Students of a high school campus of the National College of Professional Technical Education, Conalep Ing. Bernardo Quintana Arrioja located in the State of Mexico

The term "High School" usually corresponds to preparatoria or bachillerato, and follows "secundaria" comprising grades 10–12, when the student's age is 15 to 18 years old. Students may choose between two main kinds of high school programs: The SEP incorporated, and a University Incorporated one, depending on the state. Another minority of programs are available only for private schools, such as the International Baccalaureate which carries a completely different system. Nevertheless, in order to be taught, it must include at least one national subject. In addition, there are programs such as tecnología and comercio that prepare students for a particular vocational career.

Preparatoria traditionally consists of three years of education, divided into six semesters, with the first semesters having a common curriculum, and the latter ones allowing some degree of specialization, either in physical sciences (physics, chemistry, biology, etc.) or social sciences (commerce, philosophy, law, etc.). The term preparatoria is most commonly used for institutions that offer a three-year education program that "prepares" the student with general knowledge to continue studying at a university. In contrast, the term bachillerato is most often used for institutions that provide vocational training, in two or three years, so the graduate can get a job as a skilled worker, for example, an assistant accountant, a bilingual secretary or a technician. An example of an institution that provides this kind of skills in Mexico is the National College of Professional Technical Education (Conalep).

== Educational integration ==
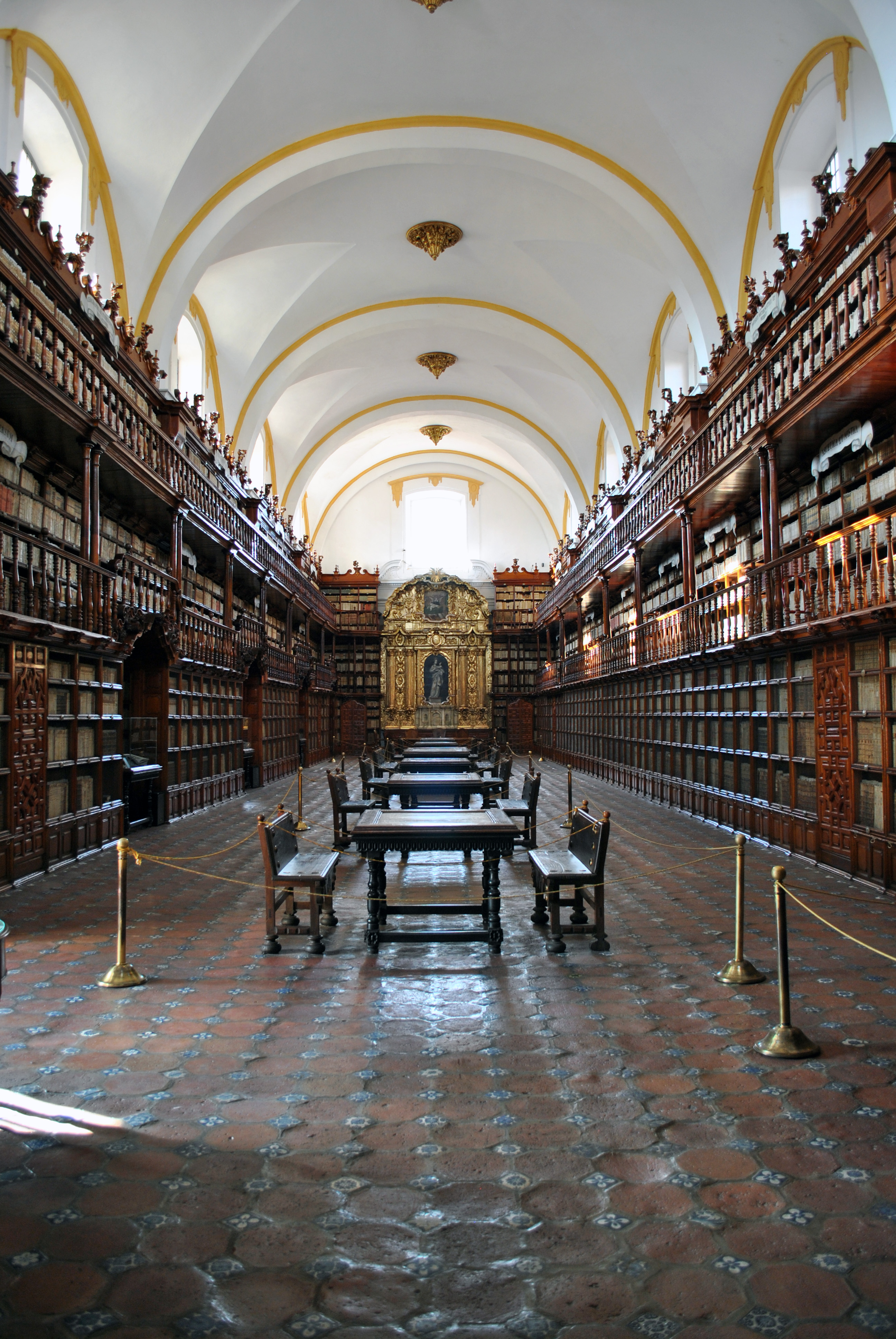
The Biblioteca Palafoxiana founded in 1646, was the first public library in colonial Mexico, and is sometimes considered the first in the Americas. In 2005, it was listed on UNESCO's Memory of the World Register

In 1993, educational integration was formally implemented nationwide through the reform article 41 of the General Education Law. This law mandates the integration of students with special needs into regular classrooms. Although formally, the term 'educational integration' is used, 'inclusive education' is often used to describe the educational system. Implementation of educational integration has taken many years and still continues to face obstacles.

Under the current model, students with severe disabilities that would not benefit from inclusion, study the same curriculum as regular classrooms in separate schools called Centros de Atencion Multiple [Multiple Attention Center], or CAM. Otherwise, special needs students are placed in regular classrooms and are supported by the Unidades de Servicio y Apoyo a la Educación Regular or the Unit of Support Services for Regular Education, (USAER). This group is made up of special education teachers, speech therapists, psychologists and other professionals to help special needs students in the classroom and minimize barriers to their learning.

=== Challenges to educational integration ===
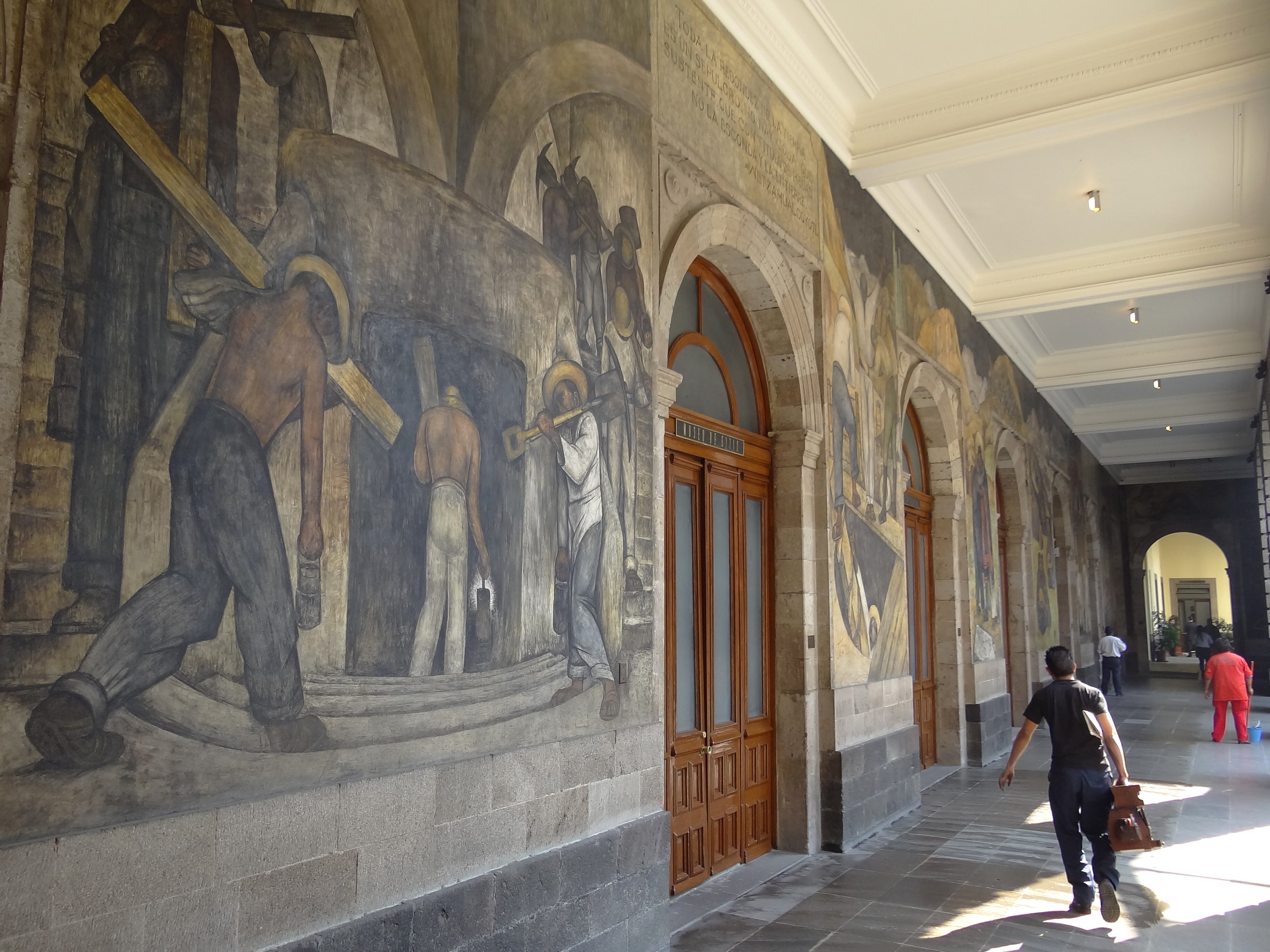
Diego Rivera murals in the offices of the Secretaría de Educación Pública (SEP) located in Mexico City

The combination of USAER professionals and regular teaching working in the same classroom has caused some issues for educational integration. Specifically, there is confusion about the roles of USAER professionals who work in regular classrooms. A study of USAER members found that regardless of urban or rural contexts, professionals had four common concerns. First, USAER professionals felt that they lacked preparation for working in the classroom. The second issue was feeling like their role had changed due to more demands being placed on them. The last two concerns were the lack of communication and collaboration between teachers and USAER professionals. Although the two work in the same classroom, they often work independently. However, this creates problems when adjusting the curriculum for special needs students.

Accessibility is another challenge for educational integration. Schools are required to have accessible buildings and classrooms, provide technical support and appropriate materials for special needs students, but a case study found that the school was not equipped for students with sensory disabilities. The school lacked accessible furniture, handicapped restrooms or proper modification for students with sensory disabilities.

Finally, training for new teachers doesn't provide them enough experience with special needs students, making the shift to educational integration difficult. A study of 286 pre-service teachers found that a third of didn't have any experience working with special needs students. Additionally, 44% of the teachers reported having no formal training in working with this population. A qualitative study on pre-service teachers assessed their attitude towards special needs students and their self-efficacy found that overall most teachers have positive perceptions of inclusive education. However, teachers with more hours of training, more teaching experience, and better knowledge of policies had higher levels of confidence in working with students with disabilities.

== Quality of education in Mexico ==
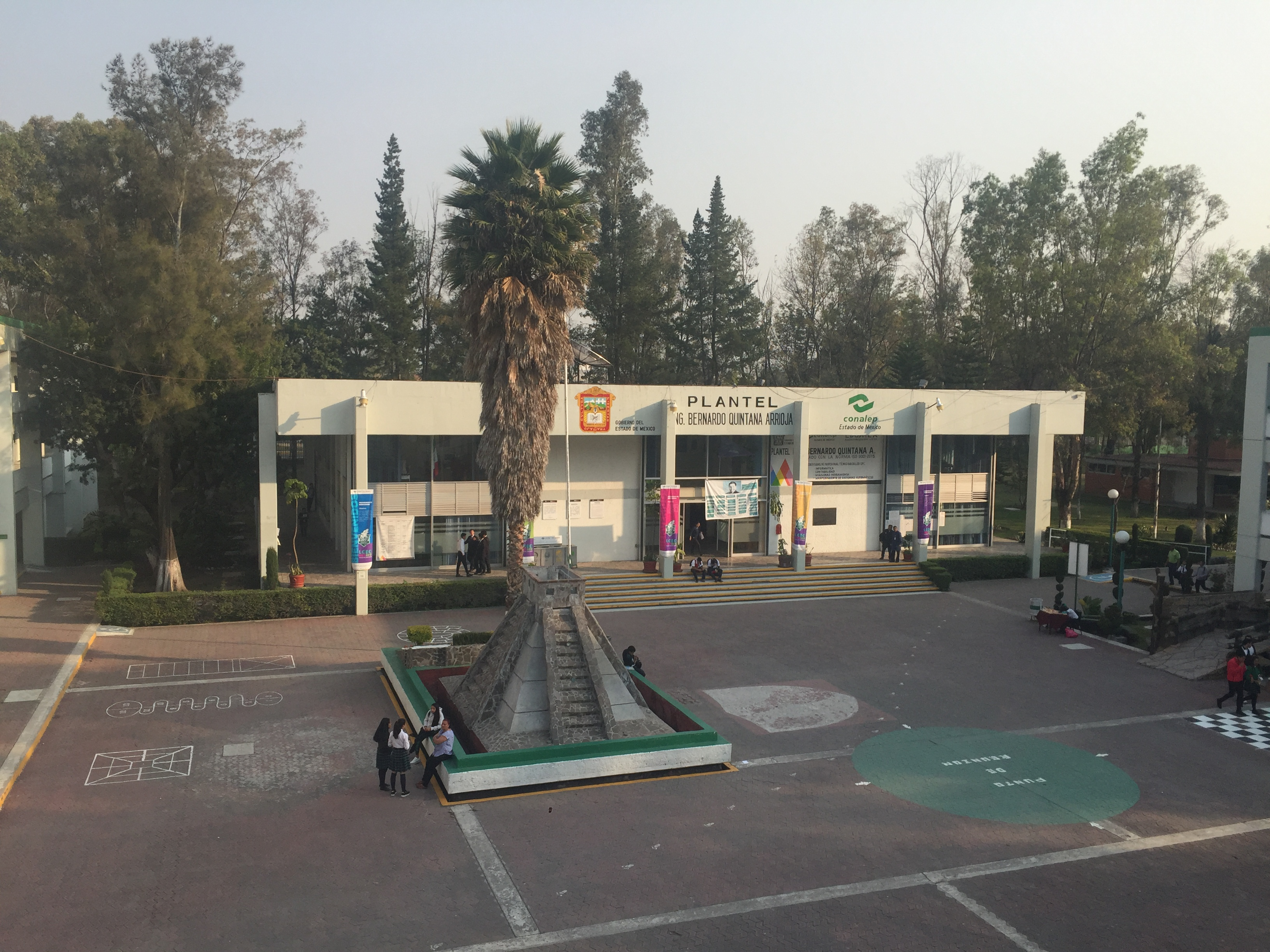
The high school campus of the National College of Professional Technical Education, Conalep Ing. Bernardo Quintana Arrioja in the State of Mexico. Named after Mexican civil engineer, Bernardo Quintana Arrioja

In recent years, the progression through Mexican education has come under much criticism. In 2011, while over 90% of children in Mexico attended primary school, only 62% attended secondary school. Only 45% finished secondary school. After secondary school, only a quarter passed on to higher education. An OECD report showed the number of young adults who finished secondary school fell from 49% to 41% between 2019 and 2024.

A commonly cited reason for this is the lack of infrastructure throughout the rural schools. The government has been criticized for investing too little in students, relative to budget. In its 2012 report on education, the OECD placed Mexico at below average in mathematics, science, and reading.

A program of education reform was enacted in February 2013 which provided for a shift in control of the education system from the teachers union SNTE and its political leader, Elba Esther Gordillo, to the central and state governments. Education in Mexico had been controlled by the teachers union and its leaders for many years. Shortly thereafter Gordillo was arrested on racketeering charges. As of 2016 the government continued to struggle with the union and its offshoot, CNTE.

== Higher education ==
There are both public and private institutions of higher education. Higher education usually follows the US education model, with an at least 4-year bachelor's degree undergraduate level (Licenciatura), and two degrees at the postgraduate level, a 2-year Master's degree (Maestría), and a 3-year Doctoral degree (Doctorado), followed by the higher doctorate of Doctor of Sciences (Doctor en Ciencias).

This structure of education very closely conforms to the Bologna Process started in Europe in 1999, allowing Mexican students to study abroad and pursue a master's degree after Licenciatura, or a Doctoral degree after Maestría. Unlike other OECD countries, the majority of Mexico's public universities do not accredit part-time enrollment programs.

=== Undergraduate studies ===
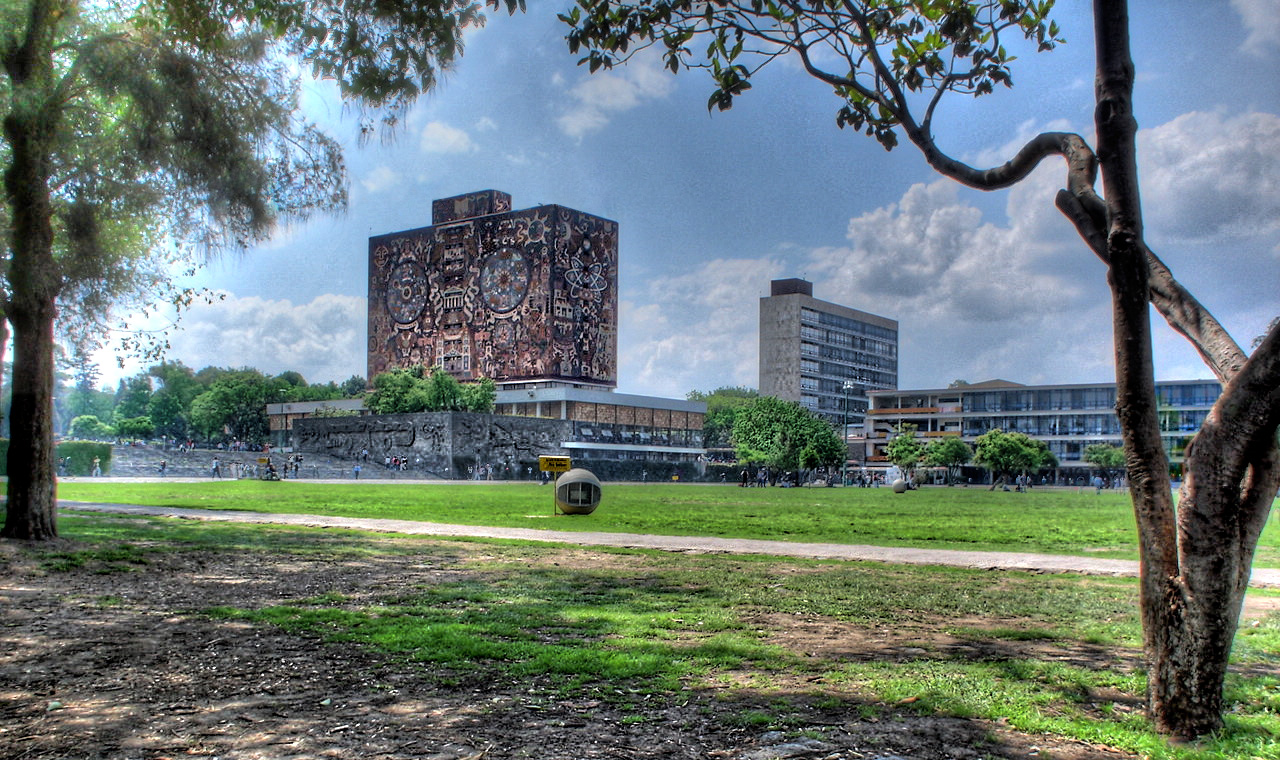
Universidad Nacional Autónoma de México, the main campus of this public university in Mexico City

Undergraduate studies normally last at least 4 years, divided into semesters or quarters, depending on the college or university, and lead to a bachelor's degree (Licenciatura). According to OECD reports, 23% of Mexicans aged 23–35 have a college degree.

Although in theory every graduate of a Licenciatura is a Licenciate (Licenciado, abbreviated Lic.) of his or her profession, it is common to use different titles for common professions such as Engineering and Architecture.

- Engineer, Ingeniero, abbreviated Ing.
  - Electrical Engineer, Ingeniero Eléctrico
  - Electronics Engineer, Ingeniero Electrónico
  - Mechanical Engineer, Ingeniero Mecánico
  - Computer Systems Engineer, Ingeniero en Sistemas Computacionales, abbreviated I.S.C.
- Architect, Arquitecto, abbreviated Arq.
- Licenciate, any degree, especially those from social sciences, Licenciado, abbreviated Lic.

=== Postgraduate studies ===
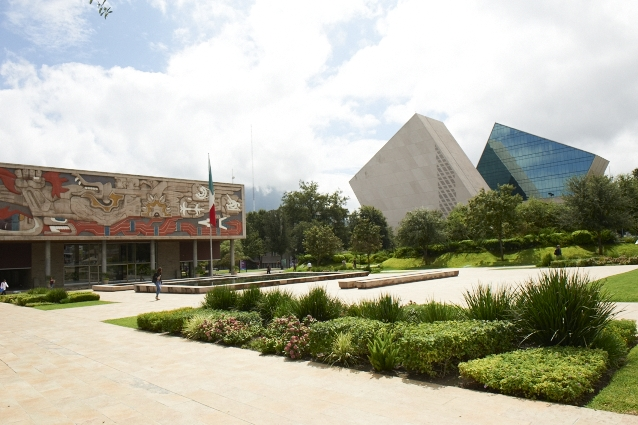
The Rectorate (left) and the CETEC towers at the Monterrey Institute of Technology and Higher Education Monterrey Campus

New regulations since 2005 divide postgraduate studies at Mexican universities and research centers into two main categories:

- Targeted at professional development
  - Especialización. A 1-year course after a bachelor's degree (Licenciatura), which awards a Specialization Diploma (Diploma de Especialización).
  - Maestría. A 2-year degree after a bachelor's degree (Licenciatura), which awards the title of Master (Maestro).

Targeted at scientific research

- Maestría en Ciencias. A 2-year degree after a bachelor's degree (Licenciatura), which awards the title of Master of Science (Maestro en Ciencias).
- Doctorado. A 3-year degree after a master's degree (either Maestría or Maestría en Ciencias), or a 4-year degree directly after the bachelor's degree (Licenciatura) for high-achieving students. The Doctor of Sciences degree (Doctor en Ciencias) is equivalent to the higher doctorate awarded in countries such as Denmark, Ireland, the UK, and the former USSR countries.

=== Intercultural Universities ===
Intercultural Universities in Mexico were established in 2004 in response to the lack of enrollment of the indigenous population in the country. While an estimated 10% of the population of Mexico is indigenous, it is the least represented in higher education. Only between 1% and 3% of higher education enrollment in Mexico is indigenous. In 2015, in response to this inequality, the General Coordination for Intercultural and Bilingual Education at the Ministry of Education established Intercultural Universities with the active participation of indigenous organizations and academic institutions in each region.

== International education ==
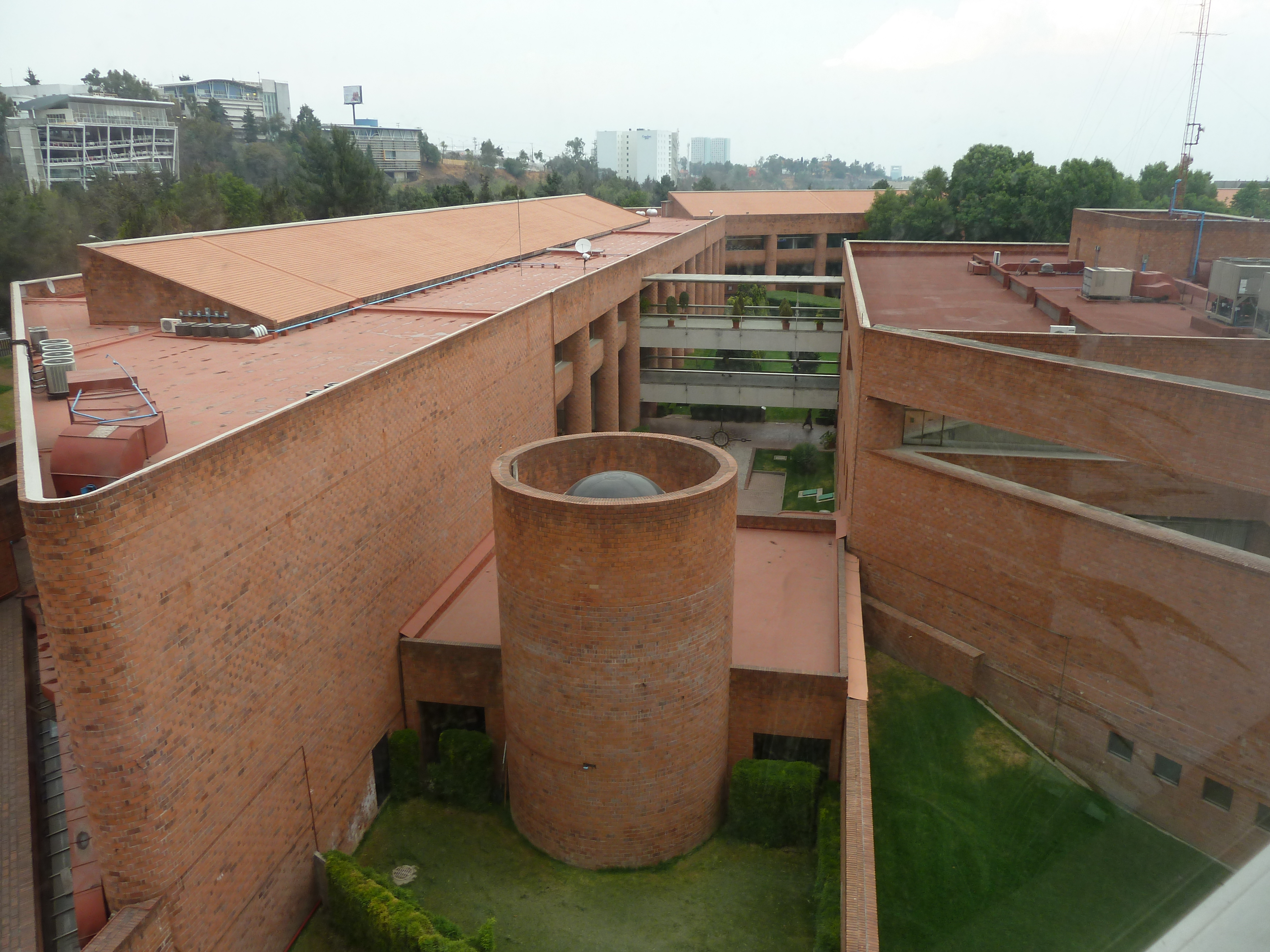
The Universidad Iberoamericana

As of January 2015, the International Schools Consultancy (ISC) listed Mexico as having 151 international schools. ISC defines an 'international school' in the following terms "ISC includes an international school if the school delivers a curriculum to any combination of pre-school, primary or secondary students, wholly or partly in English outside an English-speaking country, or if a school in a country where English is one of the official languages, offers an English-medium curriculum other than the country's national curriculum and is international in its orientation." This definition is used by publications including The Economist.

== Educational years ==
=== School years ===
The table below describes the most common patterns for schooling in the state sector:

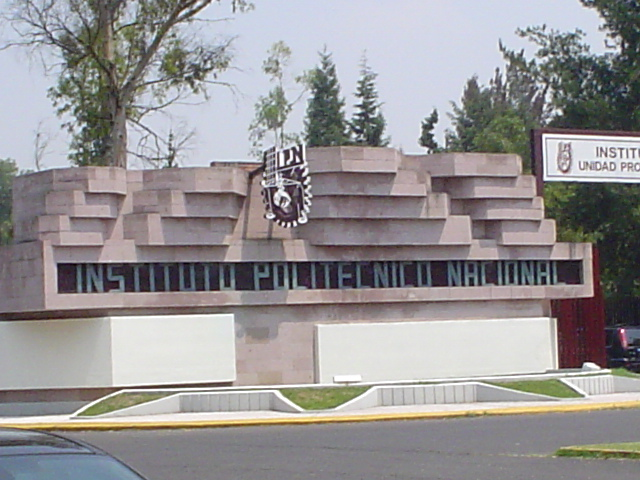
Instituto Politécnico Nacional entrance.

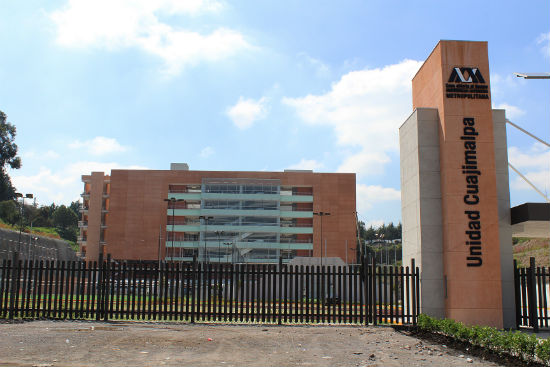
Universidad Autónoma Metropolitana

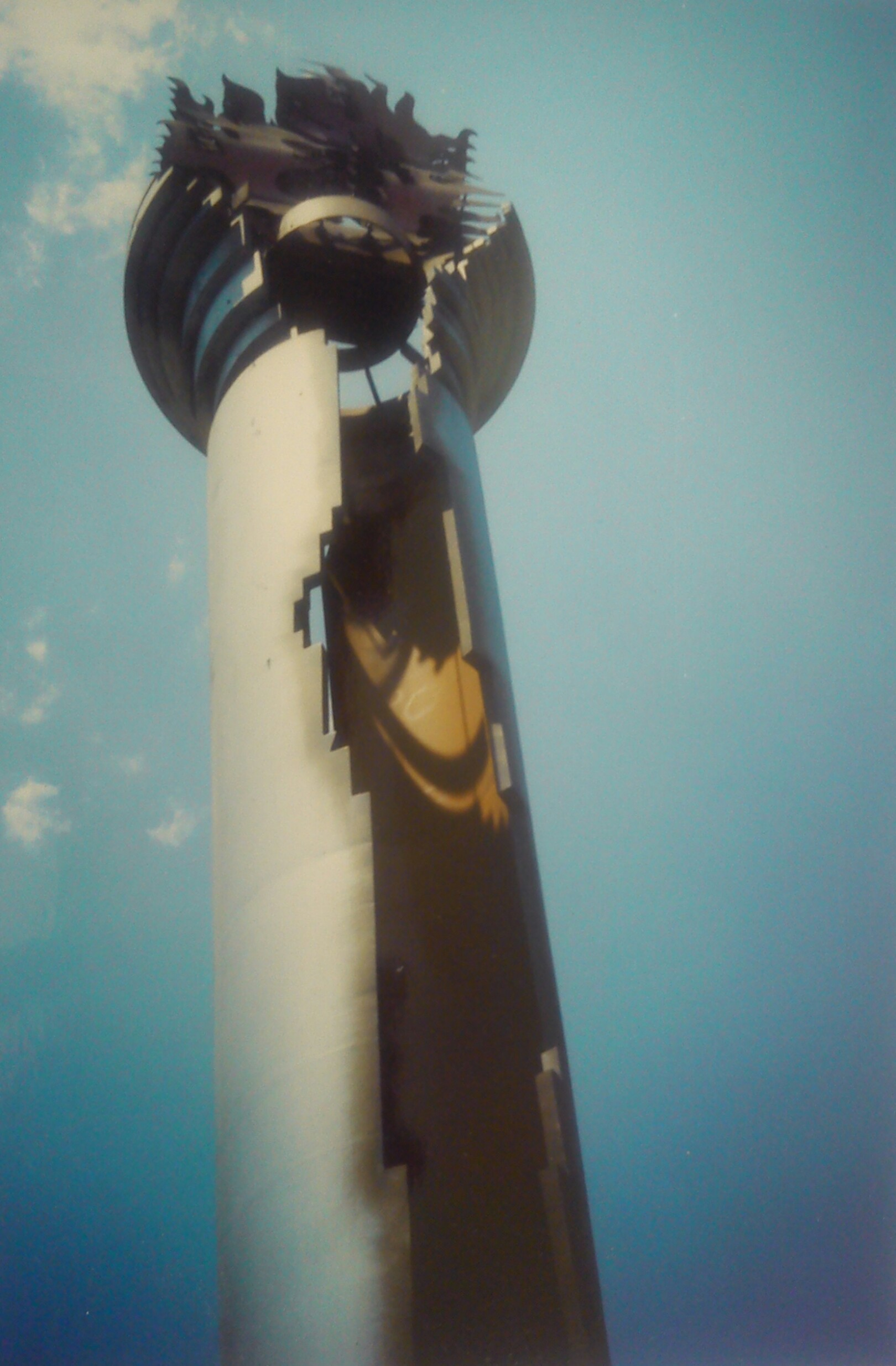
Metro Area of Monterrey: "Alere flammam veritatis" Monument (Feed the flame of truth), in the main campus of the Universidad Autónoma de Nuevo León, UANL

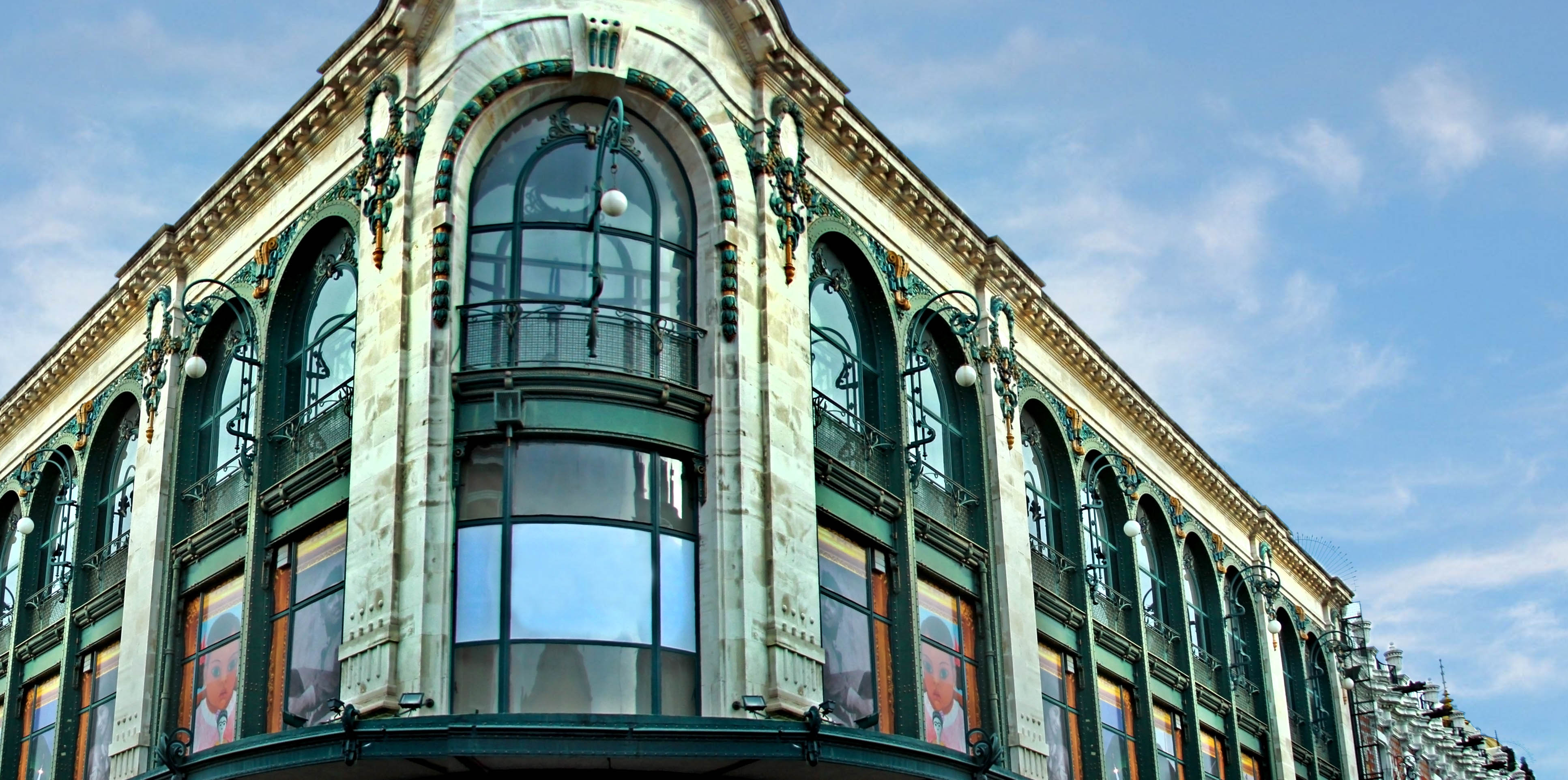
Universidad de las Américas Puebla

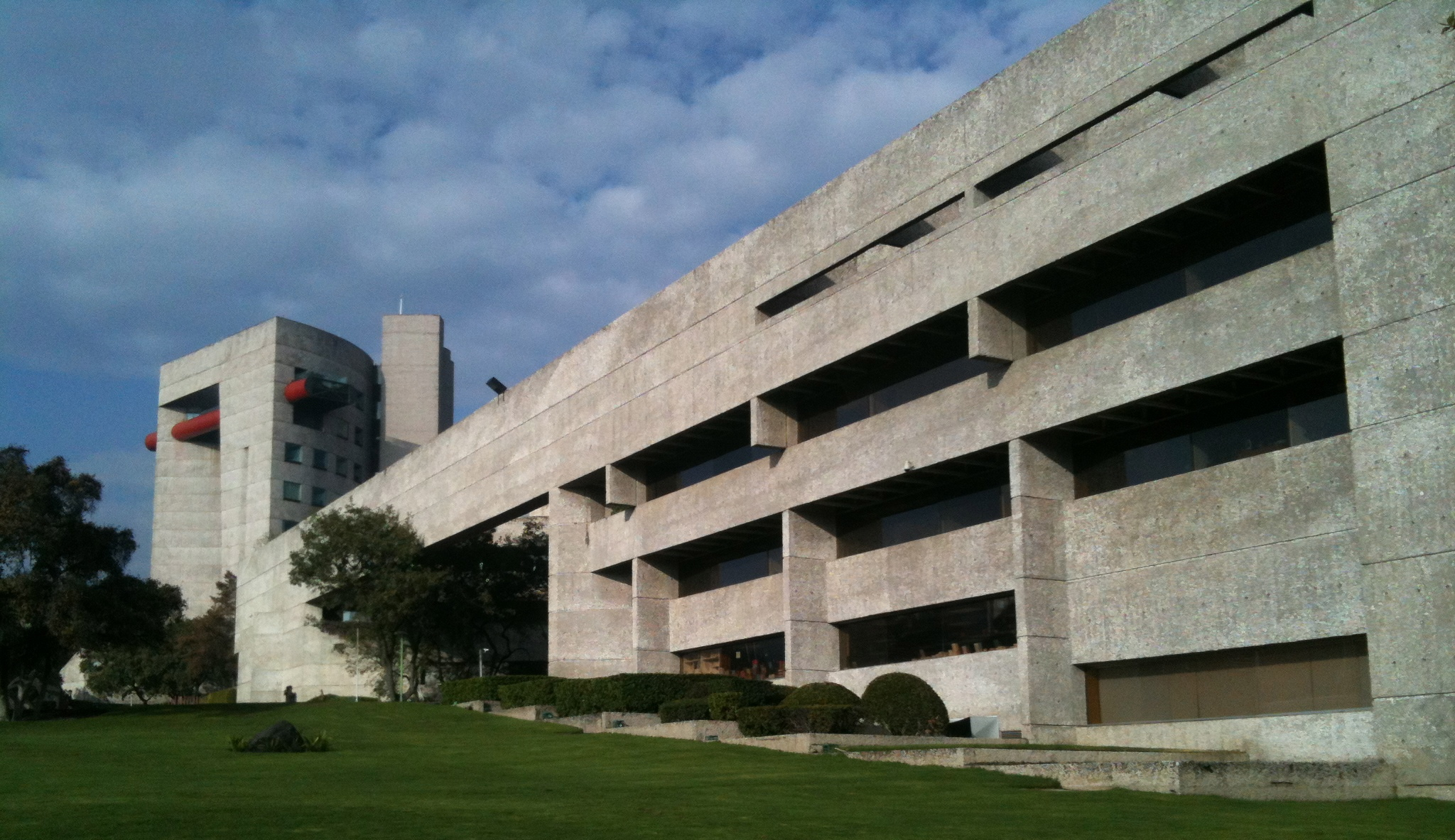
El Colegio de México (The college of Mexico)

Minimum age	Year	Months	Schools	
1 or 2	N/A	N/A	Nursery	Maternal
2 or 3	1° de preescolar	N/A	Preschool	Kinder / Jardín de Niños / Educación preescolar
3 or 4	2° de preescolar	N/A	Preschool	Kinder / Jardín de Niños / Educación preescolar
4 or 5	3° de preescolar	N/A	Preschool	Kinder / Jardín de Niños / Educación preescolar
5 or 6	1° de primaria	N/A	Primary school / Elementary school	Primaria / Educación básica
6 or 7	2° de primaria	N/A	Primary school / Elementary school	Primaria / Educación básica
7 or 8	3° de primaria	N/A	Primary school / Elementary school	Primaria / Educación básica
8 or 9	4° de primaria	N/A	Primary school / Elementary school	Primaria / Educación básica
9 or 10	5° de primaria	N/A	Primary school / Elementary school	Primaria / Educación básica
10 or 11	6° de primaria	N/A	Primary school / Elementary school	Primaria / Educación básica
11 or 12	1° de secundaria	N/A	Secondary school / Middle school / Junior High School	Secundaria / Educación básica
12 or 13	2° de secundaria	N/A	Secondary school / Middle school / Junior High School	Secundaria / Educación básica
13 or 14	3° de secundaria	N/A	Secondary school / Middle school / Junior High School	Secundaria / Educación básica
14 or 15	4°/1° de preparatoria	1st and 2nd semesters	High school	Preparatoria / Bachillerato / Educación media superior
15 or 16	5°/2° de preparatoria	3rd and 4th semesters	High school	Preparatoria / Bachillerato / Educación media superior
16 or 17	6°/3° de preparatoria	5th and 6th semesters	High school	Preparatoria / Bachillerato / Educación media superior
17 or 18	N/A	1st and 2nd semesters / 1st, 2nd and 3rd quarters	Associate degree at two-year institutions and if four-year then a Bachelor's degree / Licentiate	Carrera Técnica and Licenciatura / Educación superior
18 or 19	N/A	3rd and 4th semesters / 4th, 5th and 6th quarters	Associate degree at two-year institutions and if four-year then a Bachelor's degree / Licentiate	Carrera Técnica and Licenciatura / Educación superior
19 or 20	N/A	5th and 6th semesters / 7th, 8th and 9th quarters	Associate degree at two-year institutions and if four-year then a Bachelor's degree / Licentiate	Carrera Técnica and Licenciatura / Educación superior
20 or 21	N/A	7th and 8th semesters / 10th quarter	Associate degree at two-year institutions and if four-year then a Bachelor's degree / Licentiate	Carrera Técnica and Licenciatura / Educación superior
21 or 22	N/A	9th and 10th semester (in most of the cases)	Associate degree at two-year institutions and if four-year then a Bachelor's degree / Licentiate	Carrera Técnica and Licenciatura / Educación superior
N/A	N/A	...	Master's degree	Maestría
N/A	N/A	...	Doctorate	Doctorado

== History of education ==
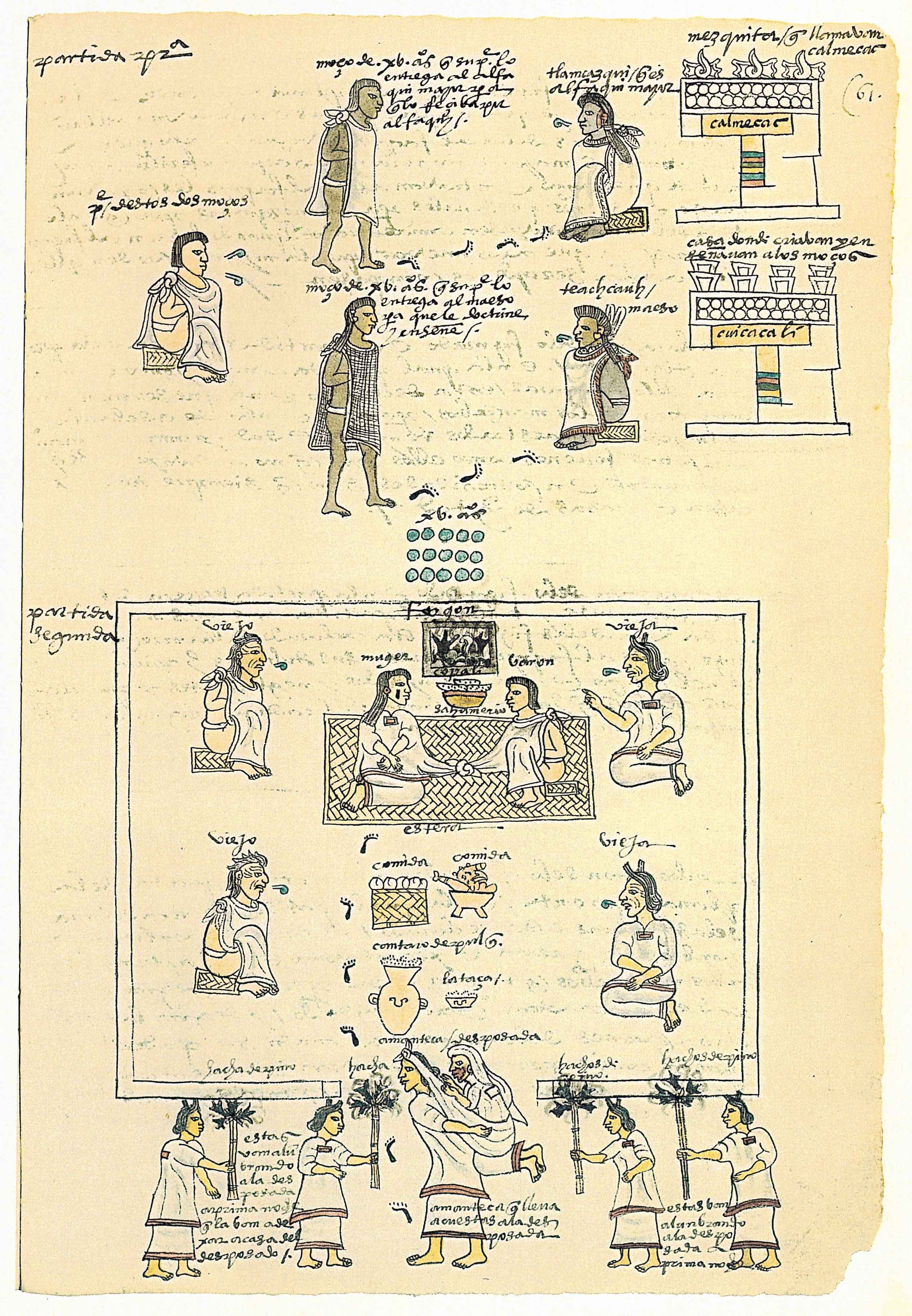
Codex Mendoza, Folio 61 recto (top) Formal education of 15-year-old Aztec boys trained for the military or the priesthood. (bottom) A 15-year-old girl gets married

In central Mexico, the history of education stretches back to the Prehispanic era, with the education of Nahuas in schools for elites and commoners. A formal system of writing was created in various parts of central and southern Mexico, with trained experts in its practice. After the Spanish conquest of the Aztec Empire, friars embarked on a widespread program of evangelization of Christianity.

In the colonial era, schooling of elite men of European descent was established under the auspices of the Catholic Church. Liberals' attempts to separate church and state in post-independence Mexico included removal of the Catholic Church from education. Education remains an important aspect of Mexican institutional and cultural life, and conflicts continue about how it should be conducted. The history of education in Mexico gives insight into the larger history of the nation.

=== Education in Mesoamerica Before the Spanish ===
In central Mexico in the cultural area known as Mesoamerica, the Aztecs set up schools called calmecac for the training of warriors and schools for the training of priests, called cuicacalli. An early post-conquest manuscript prepared by native scribes for the viceroy of Mexico, Codex Mendoza shows these two types of schools. Aztec religion was highly complex and priests held a higher status, so that the creation of schools to train them in ritual and other aspects of religion was important. Overseeing an expansionist empire, Aztec rulers needed trained warriors, so that the creation of formal schools for their training was as important.

=== Colonial-era education, 1521–1821 ===
==== Education of the indigenous in Central Mexico ====
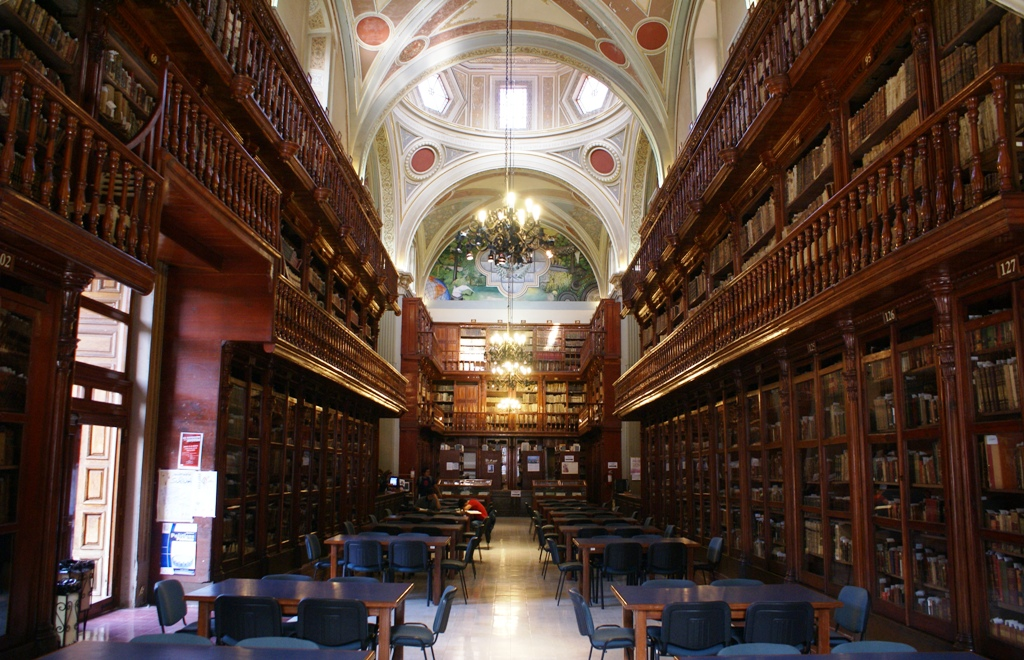
The public library of the Universidad Michoacana de San Nicolás de Hidalgo UMSNH. The oldest institution of higher education in the Americas

The Spanish Crown made a significant commitment to education in colonial New Spain. The first efforts of schooling in Mexico were friars' evangelization of indigenous populations. "Educating the native population was a crucial justification of the colonizing enterprise, and that criollo (Spanish American) culture was encouraged as a vehicle for integrating" the indigenous. Fray Pedro de Gante established schools for indigenous in the immediate post-conquest years and produced pictorial texts to teach Catholic doctrine.

All the mendicant orders in Mexico, the Franciscans, Dominicans, and Augustinians, built churches in large indigenous communities as places of worship and to teach the catechism, so that large outdoor atriums functioned as classrooms. Elite indigenous lads were tapped for training as catechists and helpers to the priests, whose small numbers could in no way minister to large numbers of ordinary indigenous.

In 1536, the Franciscans and the Spanish crown established a school to train indigenous men to be ordained as Catholic priests, the Colegio de Santa Cruz de Tlatelolco. It was ultimately deemed a failure in its goal of training priests, but did create a small cohort of indigenous men who were literate in their native language of Nahuatl, as well as Spanish and Latin. The Franciscans also founded the school of San José de los Naturales in Mexico City, which taught trades and crafts to boys. The Colegio de San Gregorio was also founded for the education of indigenous elites, the most famous of whom was Chimalpahin, also known as Don Domingo Francisco de San Antón Muñón Chimalpahin Quauhtlehuanitzin.

Religious orders, particularly the Franciscans, taught indigenous scribes in central Mexico to be literate in their own languages, allowing the creation of documents at the local level for colonial officials and communities to enable crown administration as well as production of last will and testaments, petitions to the crown, bills of sale, censuses and other types of legal record to be produced at the local level. The large number of indigenous language documents found in the archives in Mexico and elsewhere have enabled scholars of the New Philology to analyze life of Mexico's colonial-era indigenous from indigenous perspectives. However, despite the large volume of documentation in indigenous languages, there is no evidence of that even elite indigenous women were literate.

==== Education of elite Creole men ====
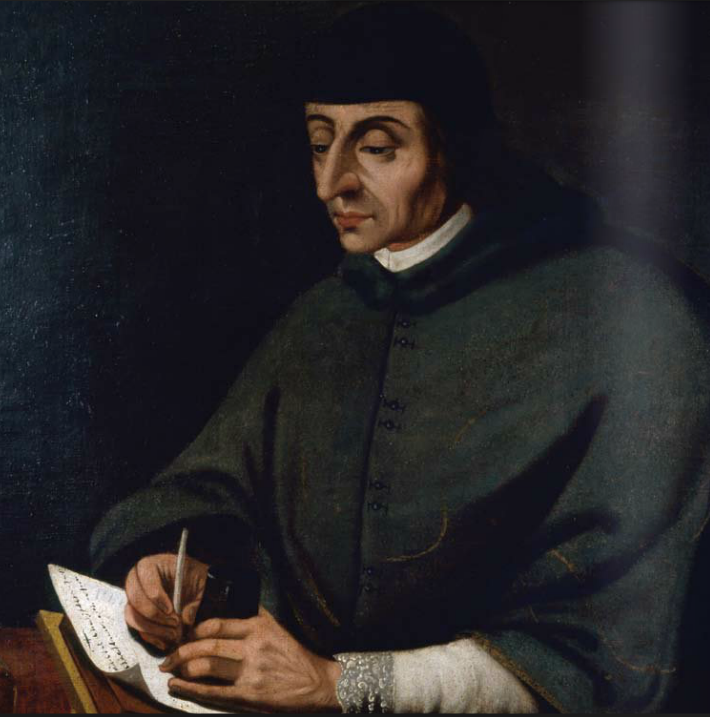
A portrait of Francisco Cervantes de Salazar by José de Bustos, Museo Soumaya

The Royal and Pontifical University of Mexico was founded in September 1551 at the request by Mexico's first viceroy, Don Antonio de Mendoza to the Spanish crown. The university was located in the central core (traza) of History of Mexico City. By comparison, Harvard College, the oldest in the United States, was founded in 1636 and the oldest Canadian University, Université Laval dates from 1663. Its first rector, Francisco Cervantes de Salazar, wrote an account of the university. The institution initially trained in priests, lawyers, and starting in 1579, medical doctors.

These were the traditional disciplines of the medieval and early modern eras. The Royal and Pontifical University was the sole institution that could confer academic degrees. With the title of royal and pontifical university, its degrees were titled the same as European degrees. The Jesuits arrived in Mexico in 1571 and rapidly founded schools and colegios, and sought to confer degrees; however, the Council of the Indies, the royal entity overseeing the Spanish overseas empire, decided against them.

The university retained its premier position. One of its best-known graduates was Don Carlos de Sigüenza y Góngora, a Mexican savant of the seventeenth century, who was a friend of Sor Juana Inés de la Cruz, a cloistered nun and intellectual, famous in her lifetime as the "Tenth Muse." Sor Juana was barred from attending the university due to her gender.

In general, educational institutions were urban-based, with the capital Mexico City having the largest concentration. However, there were seminaries to train priests in provincial cities, such as the Colegio de San Nicolás, founded by Bishop Vasco de Quiroga in the city now called Morelia. Insurgent leader Father Miguel Hidalgo y Costilla served as rector there until he was relieved of his position. One of his students was insurgent leader Father José María Morelos. Educated priests were prominent in the movement toward independence from Spain.

==== Education of girls and mixed-race children ====
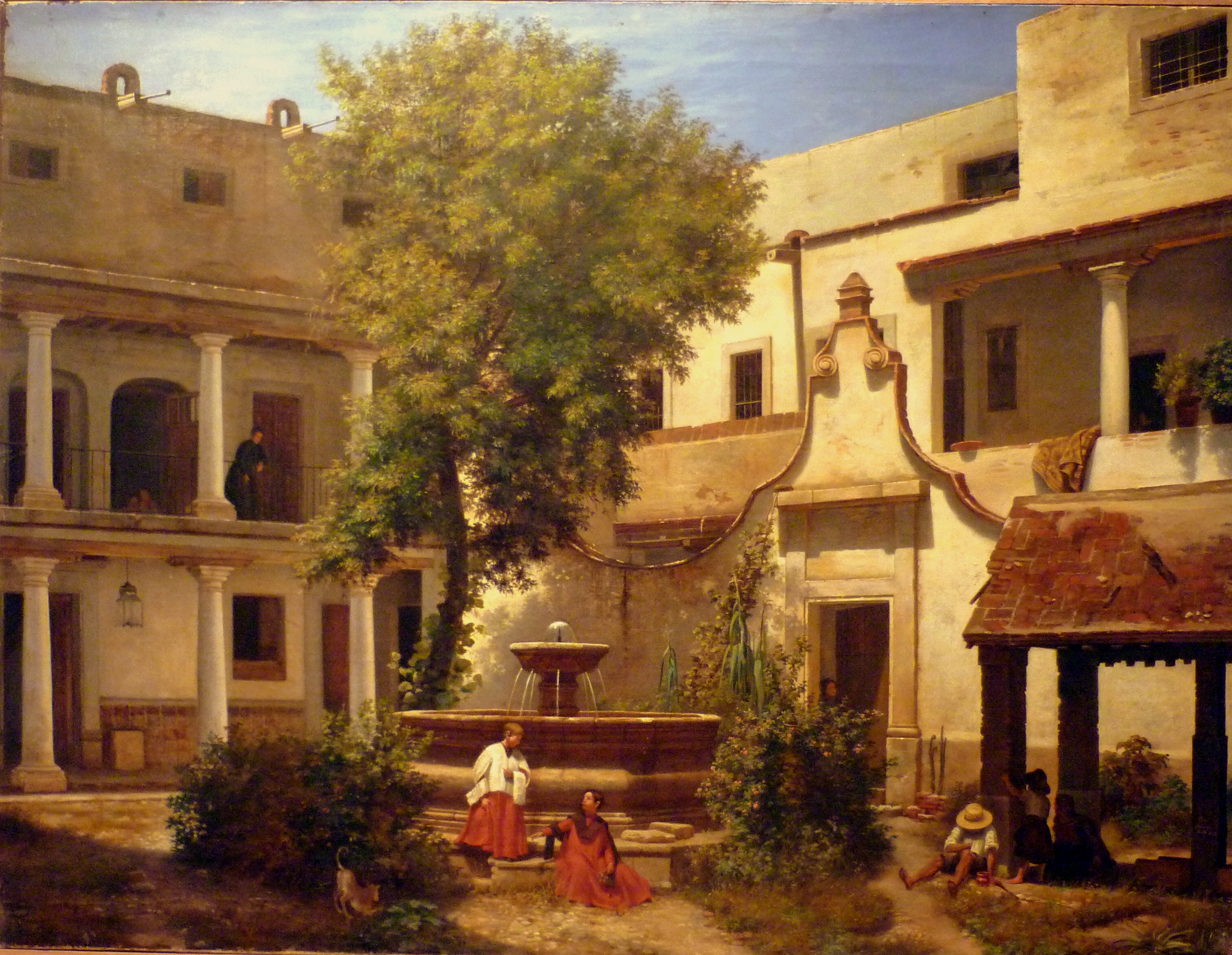
Interior del Colegio de Infantes de la Catedral de México (Interior of the Infant College of the Cathedral of Mexico), José Jiménez, 1857, Museo Nacional de Arte

Most of the Mexican population was illiterate and entirely unschooled, and there was no priority for the education of girls. A few girls in cities attended schools run by cloistered nuns. Some entered convent schools at around age eight, "to remain cloistered for the rest of their lives." There were some schools connected to orphanages or confraternities. Private tutors educated girls from wealthy families, but only enough so that they could oversee a household. There were few opportunities for mixed-race boys or girls. "Education was, in short, highly selective as befits a stratified society, and the possibilities of self-realization were a lottery of birth rather than talent."

=== National period – 1821–present ===
During the colonial era, education was under the control of the Catholic Church. Liberalism emerged as an ideology in the post-independence period, with a major tenet being public secular education. Conflict in the realm of education has been an ongoing issue in Mexican history since the Catholic Church sought to retain its role in this sphere, while liberals have sought to undermine the Church's role. Since the 1940s, Catholic universities have re-emerged. Unionized school teachers have become a powerful force in the late twentieth and early twenty-first-century Mexican politics.

=== Post-Independence Era, 1821–1850 ===
When Antonio López de Santa Anna put his Liberal vice president Valentín Gómez Farías in charge of running the government, the vice president created in 1833 a public education system. This preceded the establishment of a Ministry of Public Education. This reform was short-lived, but with the Liberal Reform in the mid-nineteenth century, a normal school for teacher training was established.

The Liberals push for public education awaited the end of the War of the Reform and the ousting of the French Empire in Mexico (1862–67). The restored Republic of President Benito Juárez reaffirmed the Liberals principle of separation of church and state, which in the educational sphere meant supplanting the Catholic Church by the Mexican state. Primary education in Mexico was henceforth to be secular, free of fees and tuition, and obligatory.

=== Reform era, 1850–1876 ===
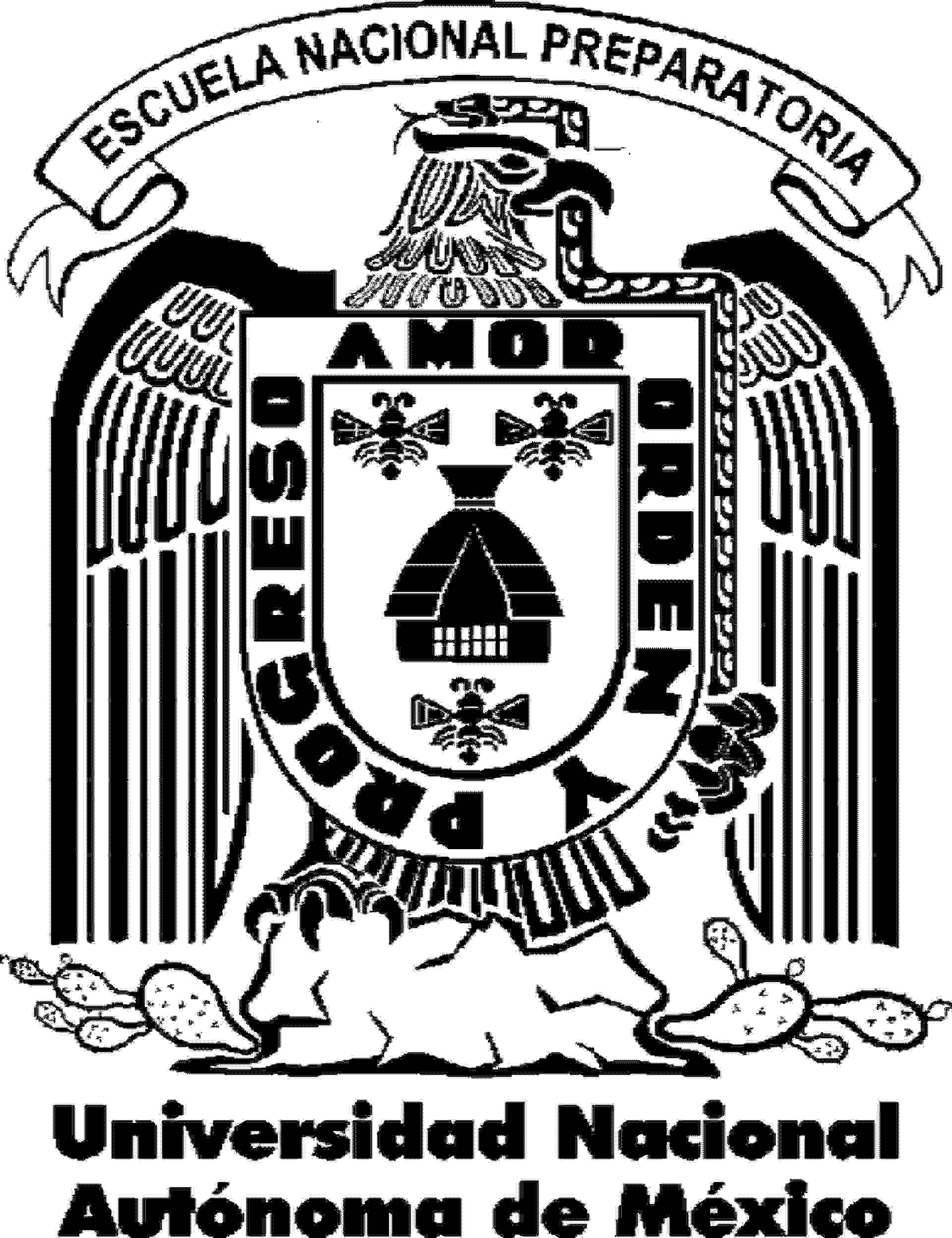
The seal of the Escuela Nacional Preparatoria, founded in 1868

A key figure in higher education in Mexico was Gabino Barreda, who chaired Juárez's commission on education in 1867. Barreda was a follower of French intellectual Auguste Comte who established positivism the dominant philosophical school in the late nineteenth century. The Juárez government created a system of secondary education, and a key institution was the National Preparatory School (Escuela Nacional Preparatoria), founded in 1868 in Mexico City, which Barreda directed. Education at the Preparatoria was uniform for all students and "designed to fill what José Díaz Covarrubias identified as the traditional void between primary and professional training."

=== Porfiriato, 1876–1910 ===
The seal of the Universidad Nacional Autónoma de México established in 1551 and reopened in 1910

During the Porfiriato (1876–1910), the era of Porfirio Díaz's presidency, secular, public education was a priority for the government, since it was seen as a vehicle for changes in behavior that would benefit the government's commitment to progress. The number of schools expanded and the federal government expanded centralized control. Municipal governments had to yield control to state governments, and the federal bureaucracy for public schooling was established under the Ministry of Education, a cabinet-level position.

More money was spent on public schools in this era, increasing faster than other public expenditures. Public schooling was part of Mexico's project of modernization, to create an educated workforce. Those overseeing schools sought to instill the virtues of punctuality, thrift, valuable work habits, abstinence from alcohol and tobacco use, and gambling, along with creating a literate population. Although these were a lofty aim, implementation was hampered by teachers who were poorly trained.

Illiteracy was widespread, with the 1910 census indicating only 33% of men and 27% of women were literate. Few students went on to secondary or post-secondary education. "Porfirian schools were more important in their production of middle-class talent for the post-revolutionary educational and cultural efforts than they were in transforming popular behavior and illiteracy." However, the government's commitment to education under Justo Sierra was an important step. He established the secular, state-controlled Universidad Nacional de México; The Pontifical University of Mexico under religious authority was suppressed in 1865.

Women entered the teaching profession, which was considered a proper one for women who worked outside the home. Although the schools were aimed at creating an educated populace envisioned by Porfirian elites, quite a number of school teachers were active in opposing the Díaz regime and participated in the Mexican Revolution, including Pascual Orozco and Plutarco Elías Calles. Women school teachers were important in the nascent women's rights movement, such as Rita Cetina Gutiérrez and Dolores Jiménez y Muro.

=== 1920–1940 ===
Following the Mexican Revolution (1910–1920), the government made a major commitment to public education under its control. Centralization of education was via the federal Ministry of Education (Secretaria de Educación Pública or SEP). José Vasconcelos became its head in 1921 and proceeded to enact a wide range of educational programs, including indigenous education. The so-called "Indian problem," the lack of incorporation of Mexico's indigenous population into the nation as citizens, was an issue that the SEP tackled. Indigenous children were not to be taught in separate schools in their own languages but taught in Spanish along with non-indigenous, mestizo students. An early program was the formation of "Missionaries of Indigenous Culture and Public Education," which had the aim of imparting a secular worldview emphasizing "community development, modernization, and incorporation into the mestizo mainstream."

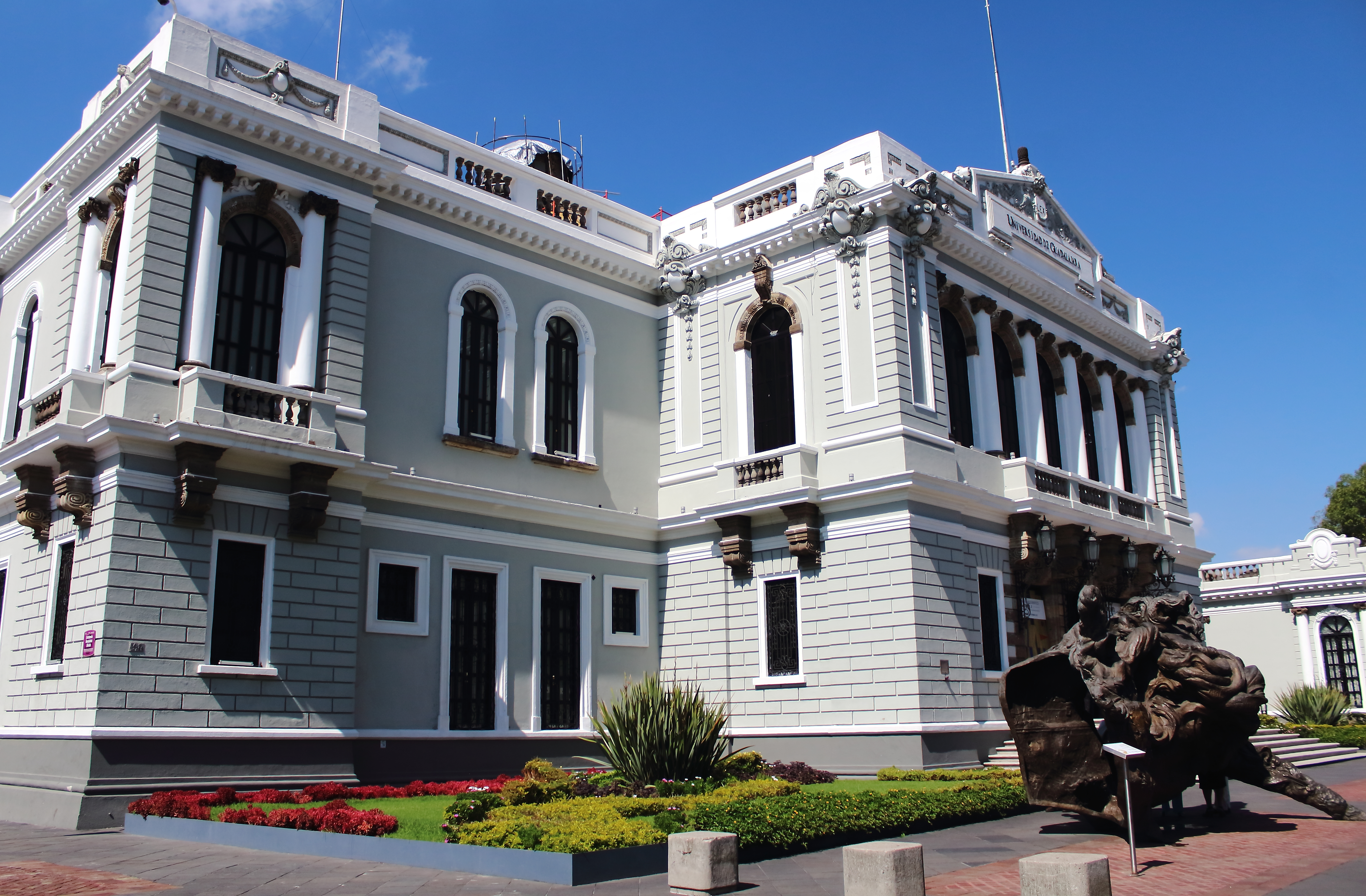
The University of Guadalajara's former rectory, now home to the university's Museum of Art. The university entity underwent a number of reorganizations, but the modern university as it exists today was established in 1925. Some universities in Mexico, such as the University of Guadalajara, have signed agreements with the U.S. to receive and train American students in Medicine

The federal government took over schools run by Mexican states and enrollments for rural primary schools increased significantly. Public schools became a means for the government to directly influence the countryside ideologically through education of the next generations. Public school teachers saw themselves "as part of a mystical crusade for the nation, modernity, and social justice," but SEP personnel often held campesinos and rural culture in contempt. In the 1930s, during the early presidency of Lázaro Cárdenas (1934–40) there was a push for "socialist education" at all levels. The policy made public schools sources of anti-religious ideology fueling resistance by Catholics.

The government expanded normal schools for teacher training after the Mexican Revolution of 1910. As the federal government consolidated power through the formation of the National Revolutionary Party (PNR) in 1928 and its new iteration in 1936, the Mexican Revolutionary Party (PRM), teachers played an important role in the creation of national worker and national peasant organizations. Public education "contributed to the consolidation of an authoritarian single-party regime."

When the Mexican government implemented its policy of socialist education, it directly targeted religious-affiliated, private schooling. Students in these schools were barred from receiving valid educational certification, which effectively prevented many from entering professions. The aim of socialist education was to create a "useful and efficient worker capable of assuming leadership of the national economy, employing methods of modern science with a profound consciousness of collective responsibility ... an indispensable precondition for the coming of a state in the hands of the working classes."

The conflict was violent at the National University in Mexico City, which in 1929 had become autonomous from government control, but there was also conflict at regional universities as well, mainly student strikes. Cárdenas backed away from socialist education. Catholic student groups' mobilization against socialist education had lasting consequences, with leaders in the Catholic Student Union playing an important role in the founding of the conservative, pro-Catholic National Action Party in 1939.

=== Education, post-1940 ===
When President Cárdenas chose Manuel Avila Camacho as his successor, he chose a moderate, particularly on church-state issues where education was contentious. In office, Avila Camacho ended socialist education. Initially, the Ministry of Education continued various policies from the Cárdenas era, but with Avila Camacho's appointment of Jaime Torres Bodet as head of the SEP, government policy sought to raise educational standards and invest in teacher training. Torres Bodet founded the National Institute of Teacher Training. He sought to create a curriculum that was nationalist and democratic. "Education was to be secular, free of religious doctrine, and based on scientific truths."

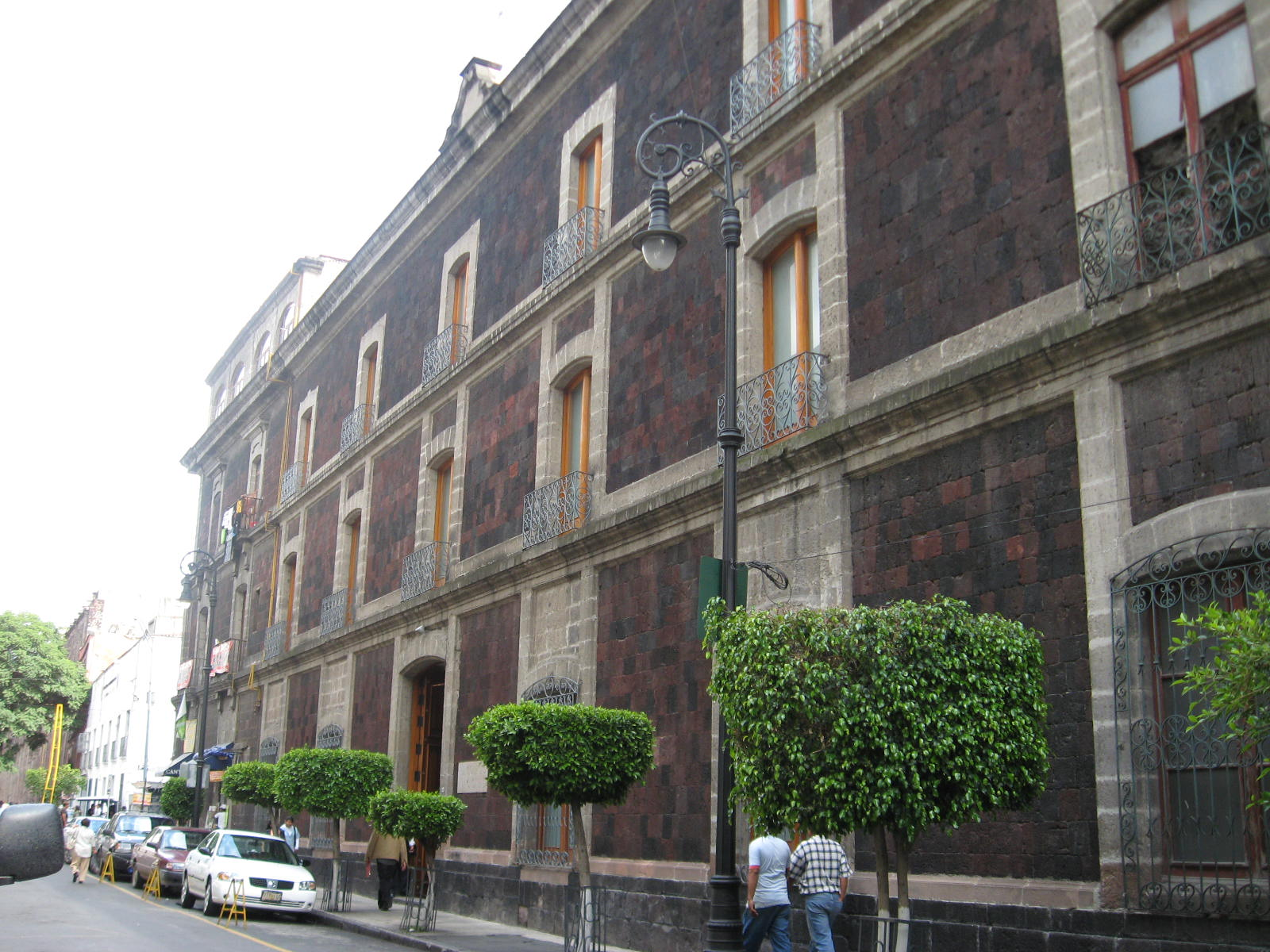
The Colegio Nacional (National College) Building, Mexican honorary academy. Created by presidential decree in 1943

From 1940–1960, Mexico experienced sustained economic growth, the so-called Mexican Miracle, which saw increased urbanization and industrialization. The idea that education was a determinant of economic development took hold and the government of President Adolfo López Mateos, who appointed Torres Bodet Minister of Education. Torres Bodet made a comprehensive assessment of Mexican education, which led to the Eleven-Year Plan for Education, attempting to make a commitment that forced the next president to continue implementation.

The assessment of Mexican primary-level schools showed that 50% of Mexican children, or 3 million, had access to primary education. Of those, fewer than 25% finished fourth grade. Only about 1,000 of those primary school students would succeed in pursuing a profession. A basic finding was that only 50% of Mexicans could read or write. López Mateos sought reforms to remedy the situation, including training 27,000 more teachers and building more schools. He also created a program to provide free textbooks to students and made their use obligatory in schools.

In 1949, Mexican teachers formed a national union that was affiliated with the Institutional Revolutionary Party (PRI) and came to be a powerful bloc within it. The Sindicato Nacional de Trabajadores de la Educación (SNTE), (National Union of Education Workers) was formed as a section within the umbrella organization of the Confederation of Mexican Workers (CTM), the labor sector of the dominant party. In the late 1930s, teachers had begun to form unions that were eventually brought into the SNTE.

In 1968, when Mexico hosted the Olympic Games in the capital, there were widespread demonstrations against spending so much on such an event, when there were higher national priorities. University students participated in a major way in these demonstrations, with the government reacting violently in the Tlatelolco massacre of October 1968. In June 1971, there was further student activism in Mexico City that resulted in more violent government repression, known as the Corpus Christi massacre.

Recognizing that failures in the educational system was a cause of the 1968 student activism, the government of Gustavo Díaz Ordaz (1964–1970) attempted to implement educational reform as part of a wider social reform. The government sought to reach Mexicans who had not had access to education previously and the use of radio and television were seen as ways to do this. Adult education became a focus of the expansion. With the presidency of Luis Echeverría (1970–1976), the expansion included the use of telenovelas (soap operas) to shape public understandings, and Mexico became a pioneer in the use of this medium for policy matters. Better health care in earlier years had resulted in a population boom as infant mortality declined and fertility increased. With Catholic Church opposition to birth control, the secular format of telenovela were a means to bring a message of the benefits of family planning to women.

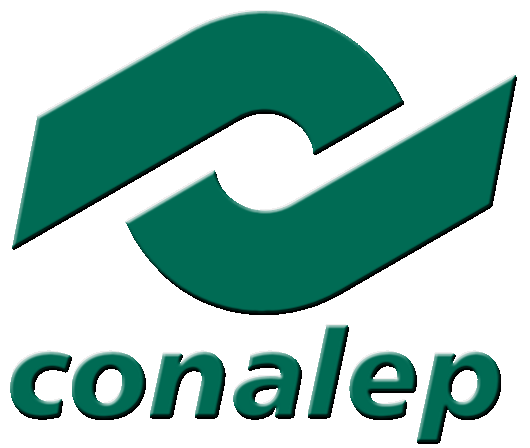
The seal of the National College of Professional Technical Education, founded in 1978

The government sought to strengthen higher education particularly in the sciences and technology, establishing the National Council of Science and Technology (CONACYT) in 1970. It funds fellowships for graduate students to study abroad to increase their specialized knowledge. Despite sustained government efforts over several presidential administrations, Mexican education had not significantly affected low education levels and high levels of illiteracy in the country, especially in rural areas. In 1978, engineer and Mexican politic José Antonio Padilla Segura, founded the National College of Professional Technical Education (Conalep), with its main objective being oriented to the training of technical professionals, graduates of secondary school.

President José López Portillo (1976–1982) created a National Literacy Program (Pronalf) in 1980 and then established an independent institute for adult education (Instituto Nacional de Educación para Adultos INEA). With the collapse of the Mexican economy during the oil crisis of 1982, educational reform awaited economic recovery. In 1992, Carlos Salinas de Gortari, who became president in the disputed 1988 elections, instituted changes in the organization of Mexico's educational system. Adopting neoliberal economic policies to promote development, Salinas saw education as a key factor.

In an accord with the SNTE, education was decentralized from its control by the Ministry of Public Education (SEP) and came under the control of the Mexican state government. Curriculum reform was also undertaken by the SEP, which included the creation of new textbooks. Protests resulted in the government's withdrawing the textbooks. A third component of the accord was the creation of a system of merit pay for teachers.

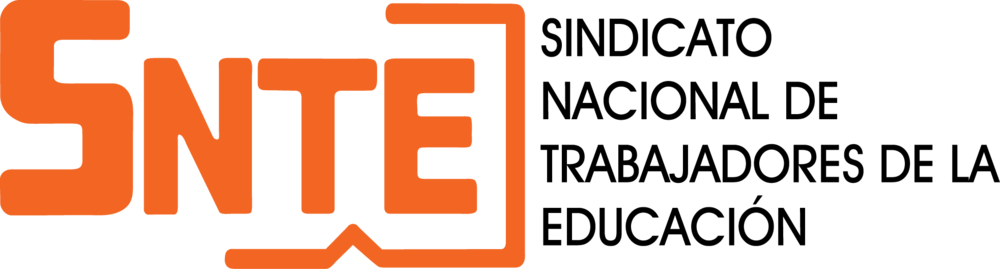
The seal of the Sindicato Nacional de Trabajadores de la Educación (SNTE)

The SNTE grew to be the largest labor union in Latin America, and its head, Elba Esther Gordillo considered the most powerful woman in Mexican politics. The lack of democracy within the teachers' union has been as a source of conflict. Also a source of conflict is union opposition to reforms that undercut union power over teaching positions. In 2012, some teachers from rural areas, specifically, from Michoacan and Guerrero states, opposed federal regulations that prevented them from automatic lifetime tenure, the ability to sell or will their jobs, and the teaching of either English or computer skills. Gordillo, head of the SNTE since 1989, was arrested in 2013 as she got off her private airplane in Toluca airport, and charged with corruption.

School attendance has increased over the years. In 1950, Mexico had only three million students enrolled in education. In 2011, there were 32 million enrolled students. The 1960 national census illustrates the historically poor performance of the Mexican educational system. For Mexicans over the age of five, 43.7% had not completed one year of school, 50.7% had completed six years or less of school, and 5.6% had continued their education beyond six years of school.

In 2015, 96.2% of six to fourteen year-olds attended school, up from 91.3% in 2000. The state with the highest attendance rate was Hidalgo (97.8%). The state with the lowest was Chiapas (93%).

According to the 2020 Population and Housing Census, school attendance among children aged 6 to 14 years reached 97.5% nationwide in 2020.

In 2004, the literacy rate was at 97% for youth under the age of 14 and 91% for people over 15, placing Mexico at the 24th place in the world rank according to UNESCO. In 2018, Mexico's literacy rate was 94.86%, up from 82.99% in 1980, with the literacy rates of males and females being relatively equal.

In February 2019, the SEP commemorated the establishment of the program for free textbooks with a publication noting the inclusion of art by Mexicans in successive textbook editions.

The National Autonomous University of Mexico ranks 103rd in the QS World University Rankings, making it the highest ranked university in Mexico, after it comes the Monterrey Institute of Technology and Higher Education as the highest ranked private school in Mexico and 158th worldwide in 2019. Private business schools also stand out in international rankings. IPADE and EGADE, the business schools of Universidad Panamericana and of Monterrey Institute of Technology and Higher Education respectively, were ranked in the top 10 in a survey conducted by The Wall Street Journal among recruiters outside the United States.

== See also ==
- Luis Villoro
- Leopoldo Zea Aguilar
- List of Mexican states by literacy rate
- Mexican teachers' union SNTE
- Telesecundaria, distance education

== About ==
This article incorporates text from a free content work. Licensed under CC-BY-SA IGO 3.0 (license statement/permission). Text taken from Rethinking Education: Towards a global common good?, 47, UNESCO. UNESCO.

== Sources ==
- Tamez Guerra, Reyes (2004). Sistema Educativo de los Estados Unidos Mexicanos. Principales cifras, ciclo escolar 2003–2004 (PDF). Mexico City: Dirección General de Planeación, Programación y Presupuesto Secretaría de Educación Pública. ISBN 968-5778-12-4. Archived from the original (PDF) on 2006-01-10.
- Department of State (2004). International Religious Freedom Report 2004. Mexico. Washington, D.C.: Bureau of Democracy, Human Rights, and Labor.
- US Department of Education (2003) Education around the World: Mexico.
