= National College of Professional Technical Education =

Public educational institution high school in Mexico

- Colegio Nacional de Educación Profesional Técnica
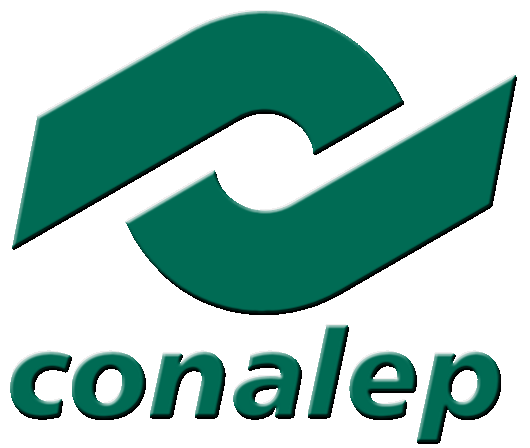
- Official seal
- Mexico

Information
- Type: Public high school
- Motto: Educación de calidad para la competitividad ("Quality education for competitiveness")
- Established: 1978
- Founder: José Antonio Padilla Segura
- Director: Dr. Enrique Ku Herrera
- Language: Spanish
- Colors: Green and white
- Mascot: Wolf
- Website: www.gob.mx/conalep

The National College of Professional Technical Education (Spanish: Colegio Nacional de Educación Profesional Técnica, Conalep) is a public high school in Mexico that focuses on technical training, evaluation and certification of labor competencies and technological services. It uses a competency-based model to evaluate its students, and offers various specializations.

== History ==
=== Background ===
The National College of Technical Professional Education (CONALEP) is a secondary level educational institution that is part of the National System of Technological Education. It was created by presidential decree in 1978 as a Decentralized Public Organization of the Federal Government, with its own legal personality and assets. Its main objective was oriented to the training of technical professionals, specifically graduates of secondary school. It was founded in 1978 by engineer and Mexican politician José Antonio Padilla Segura.

=== Conalep SPP ===
The Conalep SPP was a building located between the streets of Iturbide and Humboldt, in the historic center of Mexico City. On September 19, 1985, the building was destroyed by a 8.1 magnitude earthquake.

Classes normally started at 7 o'clock in the morning, so the students were already in class when the earthquake struck. Some data indicate that around 120 people in the building died and even more were unaccounted for. The building was literally split in two; the part that overlooked Humboldt Street stood and the part that overlooked Iturbide Street collapsed facing their respective streets.

=== Present ===
In 1993, the presidential decree was reformed to relax expectations regarding job training, inter-sectoral linkage, community support, and technological advice. In 1994, according to the needs of the country, the school adopted the Competency Standards Based Education (EBNC) scheme, initiating the reform of its educational model. In 1998, as a result of his experience in the development of training programs under the EBNC scheme, he undertook a project for the accreditation of schools as Centers for the Evaluation of Labor Competences with the purpose of promoting the evaluation of competences acquired throughout the year.

In 2003, a new Academic Reform was carried out, which included the methodology of Education and Training Based on Contextualized Competences (ECBCC) was innovated.

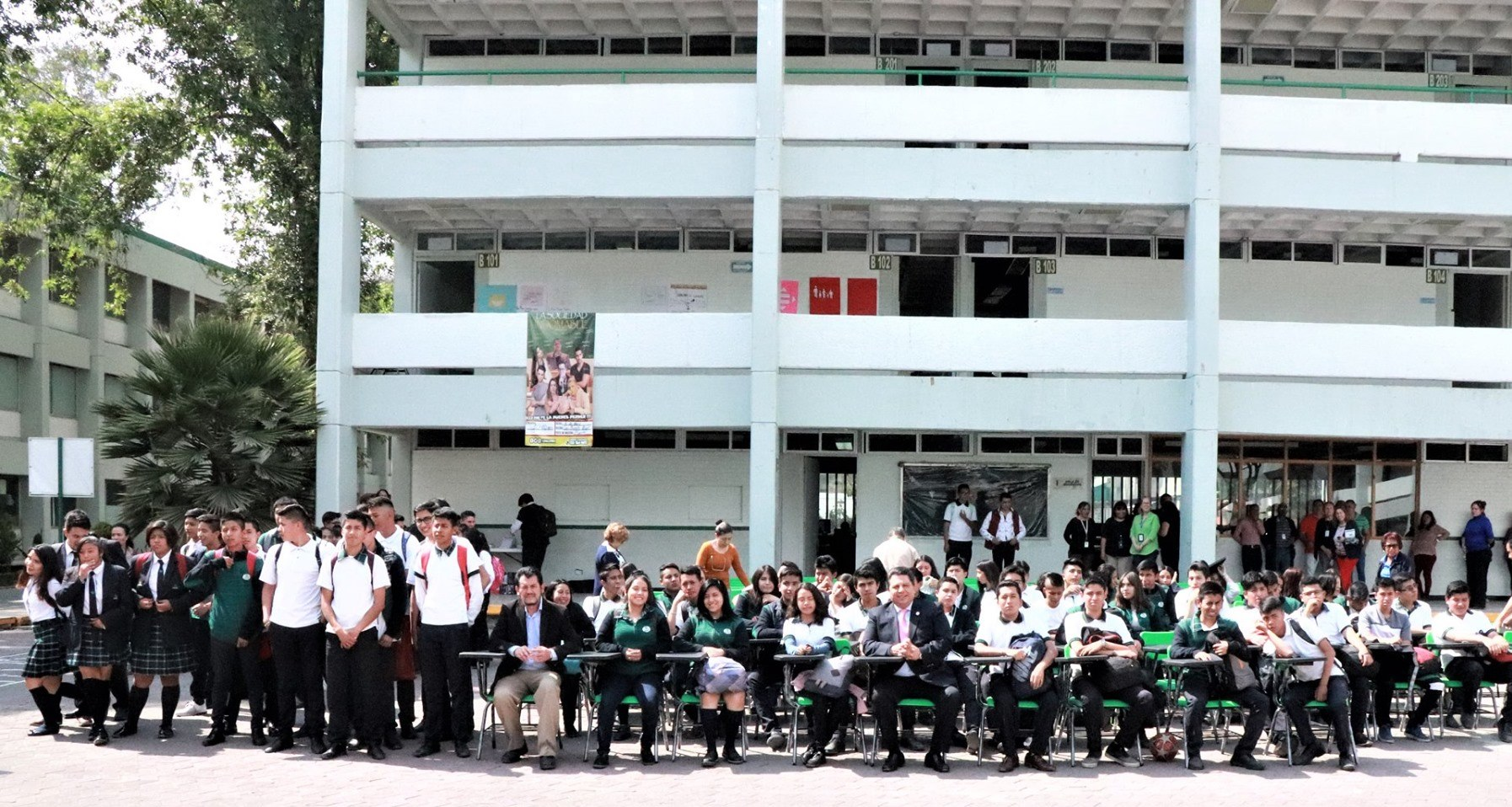
Students of the campus Ing. Bernardo Quintana Arrioja in 2020

It is currently a federalized institution, constituted by a central unit that does regulation and coordination; 30 State Colleges; a Decentralized Operation Unit in the Federal District; and the Representation of the State of Oaxaca. This structure makes possible the operation of services in 273 schools distributed in the main cities and industrial zones of the country and eight Technology Assistance and Services Centers (CAST).

== Campuses ==
Conalep Ing. Bernardo Quintana Arrioja

== Educative offer ==
Conalep's curriculum is made up of 48 careers grouped into seven occupational training areas, which are taught nationwide in 308 schools.

The institution offers different bachelor technical professional careers based on a competency scheme, through which graduates acquire the main knowledge and experience to integrate into the labor field. The course is completed in 3 years and at the time of graduation, a professional degree is awarded which endorses the student as a Bachelor Technical Professional, a professional certificate, and the certificate of higher secondary education (High school).

== Gallery ==
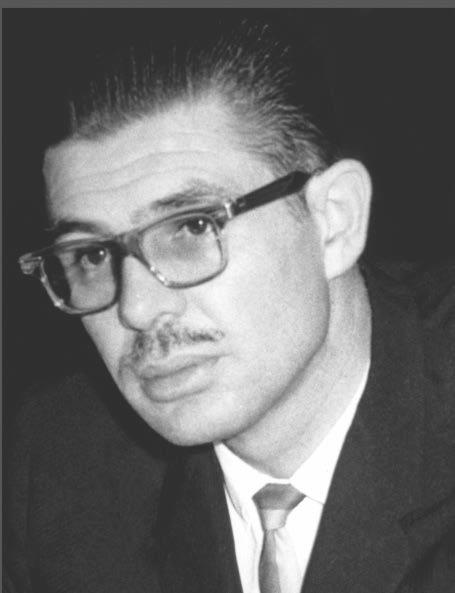
First principal and founder of Conalep, José Antonio Padilla Segura

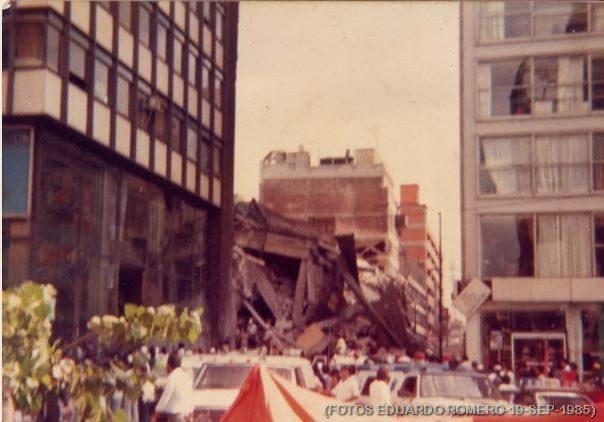
Ruins of the Conalep SPP building after the 1985 Mexico City earthquake

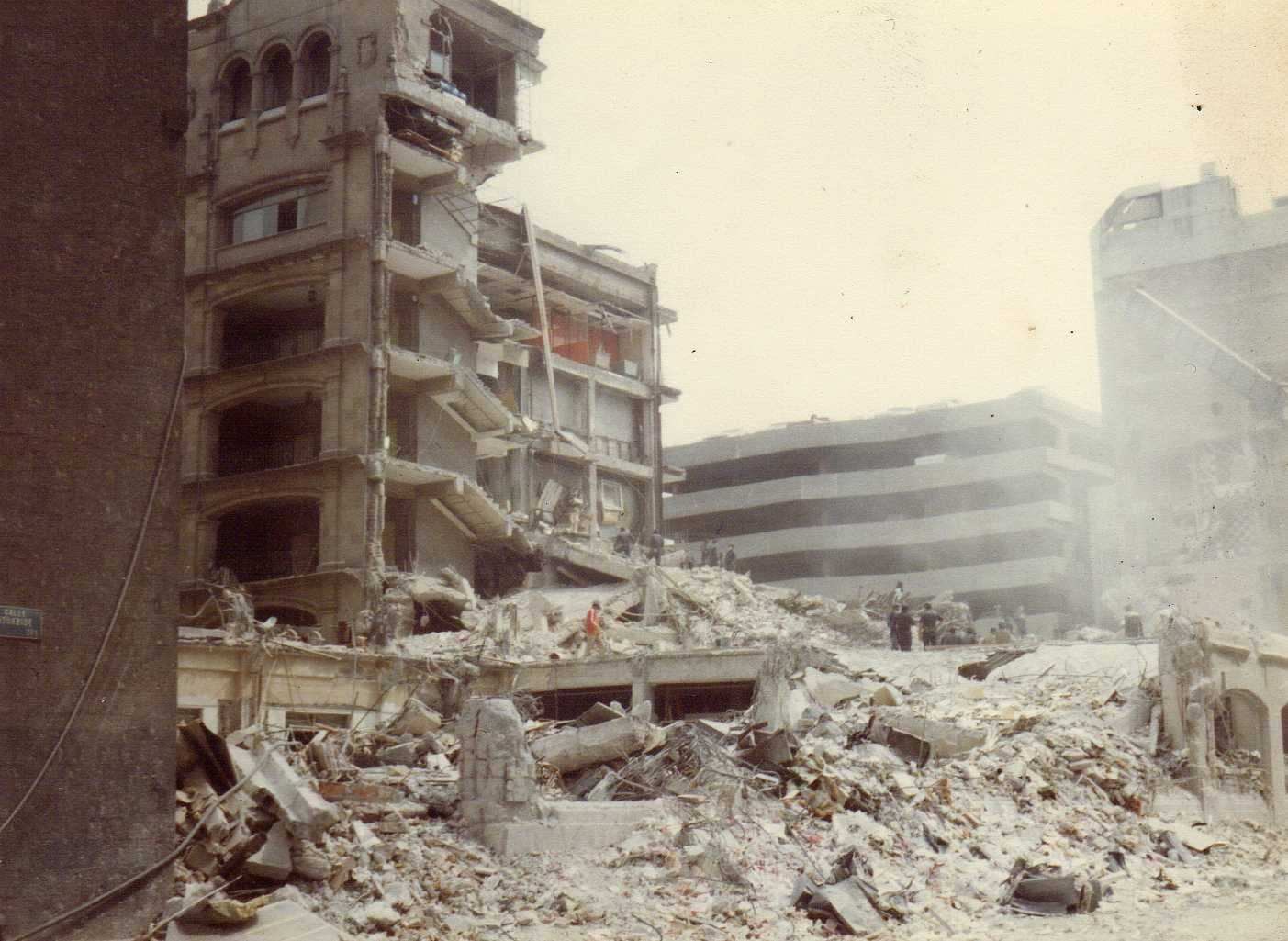
Close up to the ruins of the Conalep SPP building in September 1985

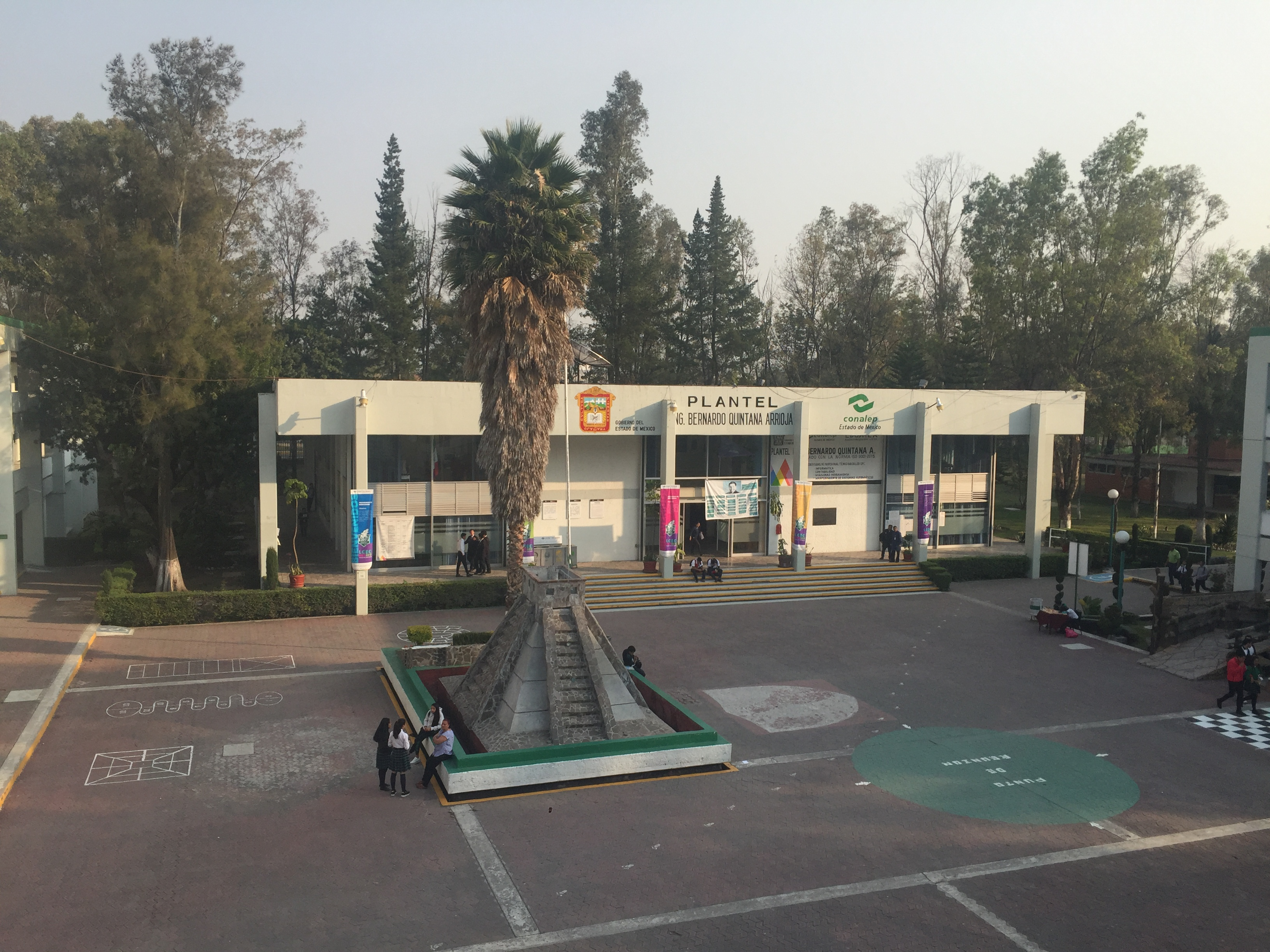
Campus of Conalep located in the State of Mexico, Cuautitlán Izcalli, Ing. Bernardo Quintana Arrioja.
