= List of Mexican states by literacy rate =

The following is the list of the literacy rate by states of Mexico as of 2020.

== Mexican states ==
Mexican States by literacy rate 2020 (minors from 6 to 14 y/o)			Mexican States by literacy rate 2020 (people over 15 y/o)
Rank	State	Total	Rank	State	Total
-	United Mexican States	89.9%	-	United Mexican States	95.0%
1	Federal District	92.8%	1	Federal District	98.2%
2=	Aguascalientes	92.1%	2	Nuevo León	98.1%
2=	Mexico State	92.1%	3	Coahuila	98.0%
4	Hidalgo	91.8%	4	Sonora	97.8%
5=	Nuevo León	91.7%	5=	Baja California	97.7%
5=	Sinaloa	91.7%	5=	Aguascalientes	97.7%
7=	Tlaxcala	91.6%	7	Baja California Sur	97.4%
7=	Querétaro	91.6%	8	Tamaulipas	97.2%
7=	Coahuila	91.6%	9=	Chihuahua	97.1%
10	San Luis Potosí	91.4%	9=	Durango	97.1%
11	Zacatecas	91.3%	11=	Jalisco	96.9%
12=	Morelos	91.1%	11=	Mexico State	96.9%
12=	Tamaulipas	91.1%	13	Quintana Roo	96.6%
14	Jalisco	90.3%	14=	Tlaxcala	96.5%
15	Durango	90.2%	14=	Colima	96.5%
16	Puebla	90.1%	16=	Querétaro	96.3%
17=	Chihuahua	90.0%	16=	Sinaloa	96.3%
17=	Guanajuato	90.0%	18	Zacatecas	96.1%
19	Yucatán	89.9%	19=	Morelos	95.4%
20	Colima	89.7%	19=	Nayarit	95.4%
21	Baja California	89.7%	21	Tabasco	94.8%
22	Sonora	89.4%	22	San Luis Potosí	94.8%
23	Campeche	89.3%	23	Guanajuato	94.5%
24	Nayarit	89.2%	24	Campeche	94.0%
25=	Tabasco	89.1%	25	Yucatán	93.8%
25=	Quintana Roo	89.1%	26	Hidalgo	93.3%
27=	Veracruz	88.9%	27	Puebla	92.9%
27=	Baja California Sur	88.9%	28	Michoacán	92.8%
29	Oaxaca	88.6%	29	Veracruz	91.4%
30	Michoacán	87.7%	30	Oaxaca	88.1%
31	Guerrero	85.7%	31	Guerrero	87.4%
32	Chiapas	80.8%	32	Chiapas	86.2%
