= List of school attacks in Finland =

This is a chronological list of shootings, stabbings, and similar attacks in Finland that have occurred at public and private schools, as well as at colleges and universities. Excluded from this list are incidents that solely occurred as a result of police actions, organized crime disputes, and suicides or suicide attempts involving only one person.

== List ==
Date	Location	Perpetrator(s)	Dead	Injured	Description
15 March 1921	Helsinki	16-year-old male student	1	0	A student brought a handgun to Helsinki Lyceum and accidentally shot another student in the stomach. The victim died in hospital.
8-9 December 1976	Pietarsaari	Peter Gustafsson, 19	0	0	A man armed with a handgun and a knife robbed a bank and engaged in a shootout with the police at a nearby school before taking a student hostage inside the school. The gunman eventually surrendered to the police.
26 March 1981	Turku	Jarmo Siltala, 18	1	0	An 18-year-old student attacked a teacher with a shovel at Puolalanmäki Upper Secondary School, causing serious injuries. The teacher eventually died of his injuries weeks later. The suspect was sentenced to 8 years in prison.
12 December 1984	Kuusankoski	14-year-old male student	1	0	A 14-year-old student fatally attacked his 58-year-old geography teacher with a knife at Naukio Comprehensive School before fleeing and later being detained.
25 January 1989	Rauma	14-year-old male student	2	0	Raumanmeri school shooting: A 14-year-old student, shot and killed two students at the Raumanmeri Secondary School, before being arrested.
1 September 1992	Ylikiiminki	31-year-old male	0	0	A man armed with a revolver fired a shot inside the teachers' room and took a student counselor hostage at Ylikiiminki School.
18 February 1999	Helsinki	12-year-old male student	0	1	A student stabbed a teacher in the shoulder at Maunula Lower Comprehensive School in Maunula.
15 April 1999	Eurajoki	15-year-old male student	0	1	A student stabbed a classmate in the arm in the hallway of Eurajoki Secondary School.
27 April 1999	Vaasa	20-year-old male	0	1	A 20-year-old man broke into the Swedish-language secondary school in Porvarinkatu and attacked his ex-girlfriend with scissors. The victim survived her injuries.
10 January 2001	Hollola	15-year-old male student	0	1	15-year-old male student stabbed a 14-year-old male student four times with a jackknife after he was attacked at Salpakangas Comprehensive School.
17 January 2002	Riihimäki	14-year-old female student	0	1	A 14-year-old female student shot a 14-year-old male student in the head with an air gun at Pohjolanrinne Secondary School. She also shot at doors and windows with the gun.
14 January 2003	Pori	15-year-old male student	0	1	A 15-year-old student stabbed a 13-year-old student with a fillet knife to the lung at Pori Lyceum.
25 August 2003	Vehkalahti	17-year-old male student	0	0	A 17-year-old student fired a handgun multiple times while barricaded on the roof of Vehkalahti Upper Secondary School. He surrendered to police.
30 March 2005	Rovaniemen maalaiskunta	Unnamed male	0	1	A school kitchen worker was stabbed by her husband at the Ylikylä Comprehensive School.
9 October 2007	Ähtäri	17-year-old male student	0	1	A bullied student stabbed another student with a chisel during a physical education class at Ähtäri Vocational Institute.
31 October 2007	Tampere	16-year-old male student	0	1	A student stabbed another student of the same age at Steiner school.
7 November 2007	Jokela	Pekka-Eric Auvinen, 18	9 ‡	13 (1 by gunfire)	Jokela school shooting: Pekka-Eric Auvinen, entered the school that morning armed with a semi-automatic pistol. He killed eight people and wounded one person at Jokela High School, before shooting himself in the head.
20 November 2007	Uusikaupunki	16-year-old male student	0	1	A student stabbed his classmate with a knife in a classroom at Vakka-Suomi vocational school Novida.
23 September 2008	Kauhajoki	Matti Juhani Saari, 22	11 ‡	3 (1 by gunfire)	Kauhajoki school shooting: Matti Juhani Saari shot and killed ten people with a Walther P22 Target semi-automatic pistol at the Seinäjoki University of Applied Sciences, before shooting himself in the head, succumbing to his own injuries hours later. One woman was also injured.
9 January 2012	Alahärmä	18-year-old male student	1 ‡	2 (1 stabbed)	An 18-year-old man broke into Alahärmä Upper Secondary School and stabbed an 18-year-old woman in class, causing serious injuries to the victim. The attacker later fled but was killed in an accident when his car collided with a truck. The truck driver suffered minor injuries.
14 February 2012	Imatra	16-year-old male student	0	1	A ninth-grade boy stabbed another boy in the same class in a classroom at Koski Comprehensive School. The victims injuries were to the chest, but the boy managed to survive and the attacker was detained.
30 March 2012	Orivesi	Jani Koskinen, 23	0	0	A 23-year-old man fired a rifle through the door of a classroom where his teenage ex-girlfriend was in attendance at the Orivesi Comprehensive School. The shooter attempted to march into the classroom, but was pushed out by a teacher. Before coming to the school, the man had allegedly injured his ex-girlfriend's father at another location.
15 October 2012	Kerava	13-year-old female student	0	1	A seventh-grader armed with a knife threatened classmates at Sompio Comprehensive School. A student who was threatened tried to disarm the attacker, but was stabbed. After the attack, the perpetrator locked herself in a room, and later turned herself in.
23 May 2013	Ylivieska	12-year-old male student	0	1	6th grade male student stabbed a 4th grade female student in the armpit with a pocket knife at Ojakylä Lower Comprehensive School.
10 October 2013	Oulu	16-year-old male student	0	4	A 16-year-old armed with a knife attacked students and staff at the Myllytulli campus of Oulu Vocational College. Two students were injured in the cafeteria and another student and a caretaker were injured in the school foyer. One of the victims suffered serious injuries but survived.
24 October 2014	Utsjoki	Marko Toni-Juhani Vehmanen, 31	1	0	A 31-year-old man armed with a knife went to Sami Upper Secondary School in Utsjoki and fatally attacked a 16-year-old student. He was arrested and sentenced to 12 years in prison.
2 October 2018	Vaasa	Ali Rashid Majeed Majeed, 49	0	1	A 49-year-old man who had ended a relationship with a woman attacked her in the hallways of Vamia Vocational College with a knife, causing minor injuries, before the man was subdued by other adults who were nearby.
1 October 2019	Kuopio	Joel Otto Aukusti Marin, 25	1	12 ‡	2019 Kuopio college stabbing: A 25-year-old man armed with a long sword attacked students at Savo Vocational College, leading to the death of a 23-year-old student and the injuries of eight others. A police officer was seriously injured.
23 January 2020	Tampere	Male student	0	1	A student stabbed another student with a knife at Sammo Comprehensive School.
12 April 2022	Rovaniemi	Male student	0	1	A student stabbed another student with a knife in the school cafeteria at Rantavitikka Comprehensive School.
8 March 2023	Helsinki	13-year-old female student	0	1	A 13-year-old female student stabbed a male student in the abdomen at Vesala Comprehensive School in Vesala.
28 March 2023	Ylivieska	16-year-old male student	0	1	A ninth-grader stabbed another ninth grade student in the back at Kaisaniemi Secondary School.
10 January 2024	Liminka	15-year-old male student	0	1	A student attacked a classmate with a knife and threatened other classmates, before being arrested at Liminganlahti Comprehensive School.
2 April 2024	Vantaa	12-year-old male student	1	2	2024 Viertola school shooting: 12-year-old student fired a revolver at three students, all aged 12 at Viertola Comprehensive School. One of the victims died and two were seriously injured before he was arrested.
20 May 2025	Pirkkala	16-year-old male student	0	3	An unidentified 16-year-old male student at Vähäjärvi School in Pirkkala stabbed three female classmates during a break period. The attack was interrupted when the blade of the perpetrator's knife broke off. The perpetrator then proceeded to call emergency services and gave them the location of the school. All three victims were girls aged about 14; their injuries were described by authorities as serious but not life-threatening, and were all dismissed from hospitals on the same day of the attack. The perpetrator wrote an online manifesto, with segments in both Finnish and English and partially written by ChatGPT, which he had published online emailed to the Finnish newspaper Iltalehti. Investigators concluded that misogyny and extremism played a substantial role in the motive, along with seeking consequent publicity and infamy. The incident was partly recorded on video by the perpetrator's phone and shared online as part of the aftermath, drawing further public attention to the case. He was said to be active on a website dedicated to documenting real video footage of people's deaths, and had planned to upload the video of his attack there. The perpetrator was said to be a recluse with no friends. He had begun planning the attack since November of the previous year, and had planned on going to prison for 2–4 years. The perpetrator was convicted on three counts of attempted murder, but was declared not criminally responsible at the time of the crime due to insanity. As such, he was sent to involuntary commitment and ordered to pay 39,600 euros to the three injured victims.
21 May 2025	Renko	11-year-old female student	0	1	11-year-old female student slashed a male student with a utility knife during recess at Renko Lower Comprehensive School.
29 September 2025	Espoo	Eero Onni Tapio Tuunanen, 18	0	0	A man armed with a kitchen knife attempted to stab two students of immigrant background at Live Vocational College. The attacker wrote a short manifesto in which he stated his intention to harm the students and staff of the college. According to the manifesto, the defendant planned to kill as many "immigrants, leftists, transsexuals, and homosexuals" as possible. He was sentenced to two years in prison.
6 October 2025	Lahti	15-year-old male student	0	1	A fight escalated into a student stabbing another student of the same age at Salpausselkä Comprehensive School.
23 March 2026	Helsinki	15-year-old male student	0	1	A student stabbed another student during a fight at Maatulli Comprehensive School located in Tapulikaupunki.
31 March 2026	Porvoo	Male student	0	2	A fifth-grade student wounded a teacher and a classmate with a knife in a classroom at Huhtinen Lower Comprehensive School.
14 August 2026	Lohja	16-year-old male student	0	0	A student armed with a bladed weapon and fire-starting materials attempted to start a fire at Lohja Upper Secondary School. The juvenile suspect told police that he had intended to carry out a school attack, and police found a manifesto in his possession.

‡ including the perpetrator
