= Reactions to the Kauhajoki school shooting =

Responses to the 2008 school shooting

The response to a school shooting that occurred at the Seinäjoki University of Applied Sciences in Kauhajoki, a city in Western Finland, on 23 September 2008 was widespread. In the shooting, 22-year-old culinary arts student Matti Juhani Saari shot and killed ten people before committing suicide. Eight people had been killed ten months before in the Jokela school shooting in southern Finland.

The Government of Finland held a crisis meeting, and declared a national day of mourning for September 24, with ministers agreeing that Finland's laws pertaining to gun ownership should be reviewed. Suggestions included introducing legislation to aid police officers in accessing information about the mental and physical health of applicants for firearms licenses, and the right to request further information if the applicant had a history of using medication. The question whether or not private persons should be allowed to own handguns was also raised.

The Finnish Police increased Internet surveillance, and investigated over 200 threats against schools. In November the police announced the increased surveillance had stopped a potential attack against a school.

At the affected college all lessons were cancelled for the remainder of the week, and classes were relocated to a temporary facility. The town's other schools remained open. A candlelight vigil was held near the school grounds on the day after the shooting, and Kauhajoki Church held a memorial service on the evening of September 23. The Finnish Red Cross announced that some of the proceeds from its annual fund drive would be contributed towards helping students and teachers affected by the incident.

== Government ==
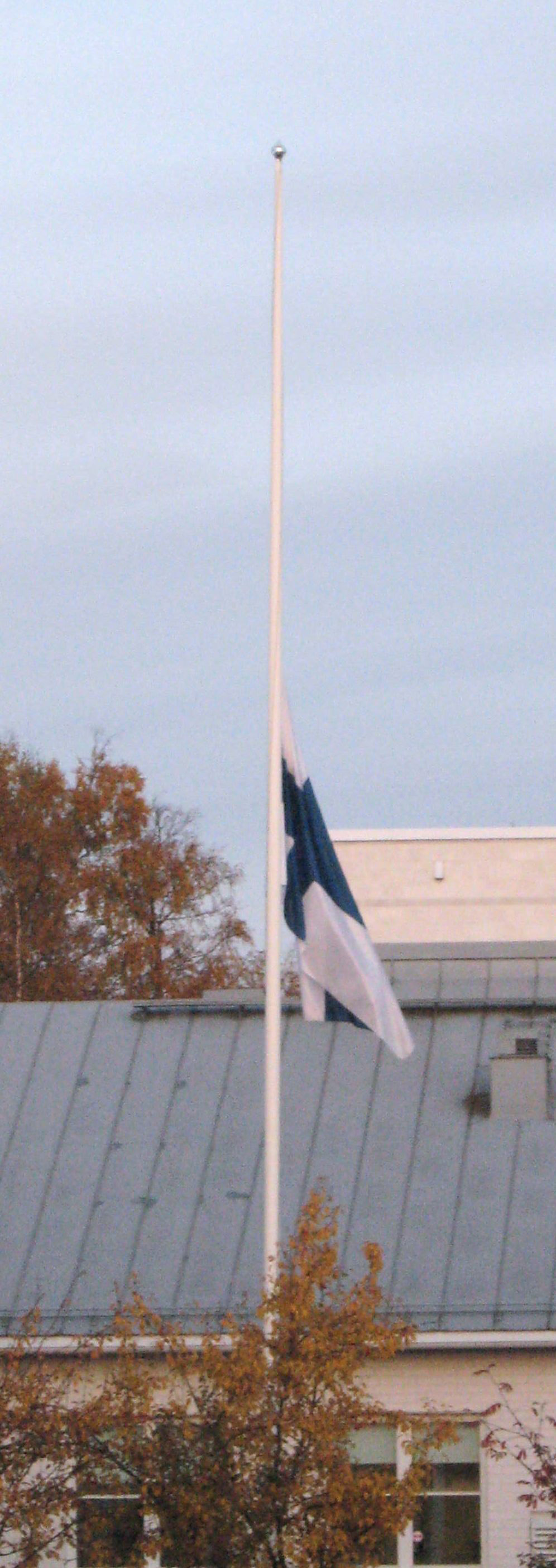
A national flag flown outside the school at half-mast. This practice was observed across the country on September 24.

After the incident a crisis meeting was held, with government ministers, chairs of the parliamentary groups, and police officials all in attendance. Prime Minister Matti Vanhanen described it as a "tragic day" and appealed for unity in the hope "that events like these will not happen again." A national day of mourning was declared for the following day, and Vanhanen travelled to Kauhajoki to meet with students.

After the meeting, Justice Minister Tuija Brax said that Finland's laws pertaining to gun ownership should be reviewed "as soon as possible", and Finance Minister Jyrki Katainen pledged government action. Neither specified what measures the government would be taking. Finland's population owned an averaged total of 2.9 million firearms within a population of 5.2 million people, and thus ranked as having the third highest gun ownership rate in the world, behind only the US and Yemen, according to a 2007 small arms survey carried out by the Graduate Institute of International Studies. The government had previously discussed raising the minimum age for owning a gun from 15 (with parental consent) to 18 after the Jokela High School shooting (Pekka-Eric Auvinen, the shooter in that incident, was aged 18), but no law regarding this had taken effect.

On this occasion, both President Tarja Halonen, and the Prime Minister said that a review was necessary, with Vanhanen suggesting that the time had come to question whether or not private persons should be allowed to own handguns, in particular automatic pistols (the kind used by Saari being a semi-automatic). He argued that Finland would only be bringing its laws into closer alignment with gun regulations the EU had set the previous summer. Halonen and Foreign Minister Alexander Stubb said that the government would discuss a divergence in policy between gun control for hunting rifles and handguns. Hunting remains a highly popular sport in Finland, and the Finnish Shooting Sport Federation executive director Risto Aarrekivi said that if people wanted to commit a crime such as this, they would gain access to a handgun regardless of the law. However, he did concede that allowing beginners to buy real firearms as their first guns should be reconsidered.

Interior Minister Anne Holmlund, who had ordered the original investigation into the police officers' conduct in the Kauhajoki incident, said that legislation would be introduced to aid police officers in accessing information about the mental and physical health of applicants for firearms licenses. This included, potentially, the ability to gain detailed information about an applicant's health, the right to subpoena records from the Finnish Social Insurance Institution, and the right to request further information if the applicant had a history of using medication. In addition to this, Holmlund said that the referencing process for being granted a firearms license would be intensified: two referees would have to be personally interviewed before a license was granted. Holmlund also pointed to legislation of the EU as her starting point. Other reforms, that she said would be introduced as late as spring 2009, included a national register of gun owners. Parliamentary debates occurred on whether to raise the age at which one could own a gun, or whether to put further checks in place, in September 2009.

Despite these assurances that change would be forthcoming, Holmlund came under considerable pressure from some members of parliament, particularly those in the Left Alliance, to resign for not acting sooner. Leading the call for her deposition was Anneli Lapintie; Tarja Filatov, parliamentary group leader of the opposition Social Democratic Party of Finland (SDP) also questioned the government over what it had done since the Jokela incident. Vanhanen launched a defence of the government by saying that inquiries were ongoing, even into the Jokela case. A survey by pollster Taloustutkimus for YLE showed that dissension towards Holmlund was not widespread: only a quarter of members from smaller parties felt she should step down, only 10% of SDP members (with 80% supporting her to stay on), and 90% of the government's partners wanted her to hold onto her ministry. Amongst the population, 82% felt she should continue.

Brax said that personal data protection legislation needed to be adjusted to allow a freer access to information among professionals. She said that this had impeded the investigation into the Jokela incident, and meant that people in the teaching profession were left unable to help students to some degree.

== Police ==
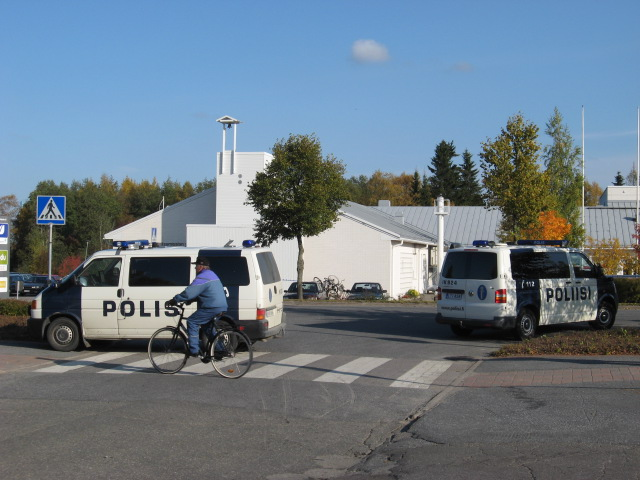
Police vehicles at the scene of the Kauhajoki shooting

Police Chief Paatero said that he would support a blanket ban of semi-automatic pistols. Paatero, like Brax, announced a change in policy vis-à-vis information. It was announced the National Bureau of Investigation (KRP) would increase its Internet surveillance, entailing longer working days for KRP officers and more officers being assigned to the task of monitoring Internet activity. However, he said that scrutiny would not extend to private websites, as doing so would be like "looking for a needle in a haystack;" the KRP said its main policy when surveying the Internet was still to respond to tip-offs. Paatero faced opposition from police posts across the country, most of whom claimed that the resources allocated towards IT, and staffing, were insufficient.

Within days of the shooting, the police said they had received a sizeable number of tip-offs alerting them to suspicious photographs, videos, and comments on chat rooms. In December the police announced that they had received over 200 threats in the months following the shooting. Finnish media reported that several bomb threats and other threatening messages were circulating among students nationwide in the few days after the shootings as well. Areas affected included Kajaani, Siikajoki, Rauma, Masku, Joroinen, and Liminka. Kauhajoki was not immune to this, and a police spokesman, Urpo Lintala, said that threats of a secondary incident (unspecified by police) were causing "fear and hysteria among young people." To help cope with threatening SMS messages circulating in the nearby town of Seinäjoki, an anonymous tip-line was set up by police. The threats of copycat incidents included:

- Kajaani, where an 18-year-old man was detained after threatening to shoot people at his school. Later a 23-year-old man was detained for talking about blowing up the school.
- Keuruu, where a school was evacuated after a bomb threat. Two 15-year-olds were later detained.
- Joroinen, were the local school was sealed off by the police following a bomb threat. An 18-year-old student of the school was detained.
- Masku, where another 15-year-old boy reportedly frightened people by making threats. His case came under investigation by police, but no charges were lifted.
- Kuopio, where an 18-year-old vocational student was detained for uploading ominous material to IRC-Galleria. The student also created a fan group dedicated to the perpetrator on the site, albeit it was only intended to be a prank. The fan group included a link to the website of an artist also called Matti Saari, which led to him press charges on the student for defamation.

The State Secretary and assistant to Vanhanen, Risto Volanen, said that attacks on schools could no longer be considered isolated incidents, and that police and security forces had to approach them with a new perspective in the aftermath of Kauhajoki. In December 2009, plans were announced to include an emergency SMS system in schools, more emergency exits, and better access to the architectural lay-out of school buildings for police. Each school is to undergo a risk assessment before the implementation of this plan.

In November 2008 the police announced their increased surveillance of the Internet had stopped a potential attack against a Finnish school. They did not specify which school was under threat, but revealed the suspect was receiving treatment.

== Students and residents of Kauhajoki ==
In the aftermath of the shootings, all lessons at the college were cancelled for the remainder of the week, and classes were relocated to a temporary facility the following Monday. The town's other schools remained open. A candlelight vigil was held near the school grounds on the day after the shooting, and Kauhajoki Church held a memorial service on the evening of September 23. A second memorial service, on September 28, the Sunday following the shootings, was held, with the President and students attending. Three members of the congregation lit a further eleven candles (one for each killed, including Saari) at the service. Leading the service was Bishop Simo Peura, who reflected on Finland's treatment of young people, asking the question, "What kind of society are we building?".

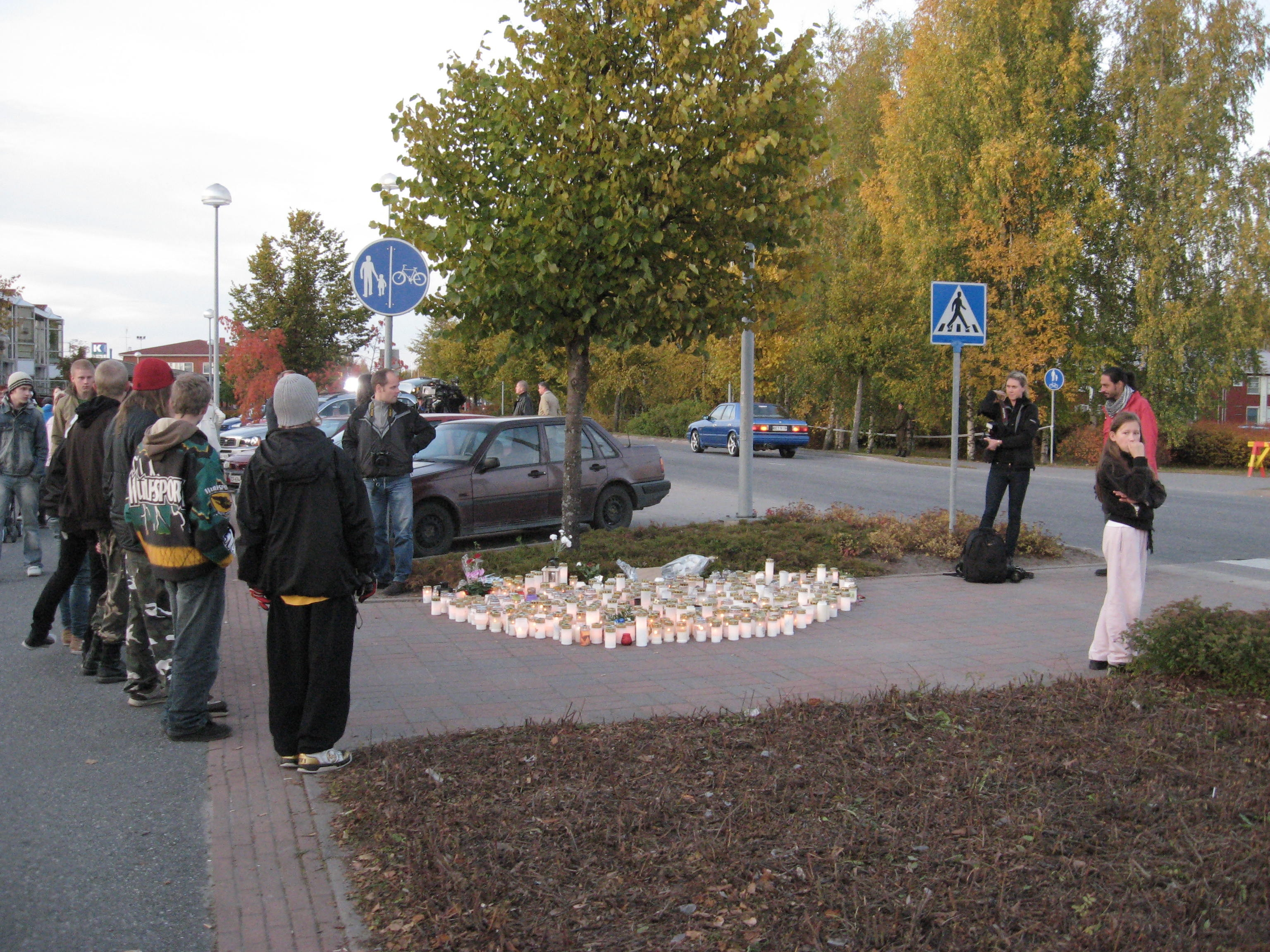
Residents and members of the media gathered around the vigil.

The Finnish Red Cross, which had been quick to descend upon the scene in the immediate aftermath, said that some of the proceeds from its annual fund drive, which began two days after the shootings, would be contributed towards helping students and teachers affected by the incident. This would include financial provisions for the ongoing counselling services being provided.

On the day after the killings, the head of the State Treasury, Pekka Syrjänen, said that students would be able to seek compensation from the state for physical and psychological damage caused by the shootings. This was in accordance with the Crime Damage Act, which also stipulated that payments were to be adjusted in relation to other forms of compensation that the students received. Claimants were able to apply if they had suffered a loss of earnings, pain and suffering, or damage or loss to personal belongings as a consequence of the attack. Relatives were also able to gain compensation for costs incurred whilst caring for those affected, or funeral or hospital bills.

The total compensation demanded by families of the victims came to 830,000 euros. Victims' families were also reported to want the police inspector who did not confiscate Saari's gun in the days before the shooting (Saari was interviewed in relation to his internet videos), who was charged with dereliction of duty, to be additionally charged with involuntary manslaughter.

== Assessment of society ==
A number of criticisms were made of Finnish society in response to the shootings. Bishop Peura asked whether the nation had been blind to young people's problems, and Juha Mieto, Centre Party member and Kauhajoki representative, said that societal "malaise" was due to a decline in traditional lifestyles, and lack of order. Psychologist Salli Saari, from the Helsinki University Central Hospital, said that the country had not responded adequately to calls after the Jokela incident that boys had been neglected within the schooling system. Matti Rimpelä, a professor of welfare in Helsinki, attributed the problems with young people to a lack of institutional support in schools and daycare, which had not been provided due to Finland's rapid change from being a predominantly rural country to a "post-industrial information society". Rimpelä and Jukka Mäkelä, a child psychologist at the National Research Development Centre for Welfare and Health in Helsinki, concurred that Finland had a cultural problem surrounding suicide, while daily newspaper Helsingin Sanomat wrote in an editorial that, "The Web cannot be held responsible for this, but you can certainly ask how much the Web feeds the dark side of human nature".

== Other ==
Like those in the police force, many in the medical profession were reluctant to abide by the new laws. From September 30, gun applicants had to hand in a medical health evaluation (certifying that they were mentally sound enough to bear arms), carried out by a doctor, to gain access to a weapon. The Finnish Medical Association opposed this on the grounds that doctors were already overburdened with work, and Basic Services Minister Paula Risikko suggested that more medical workers could be employed by police departments instead.

== See also ==
- Jokela school shooting
