= 2024 Viertola school shooting =

School shooting in Vantaa, Finland

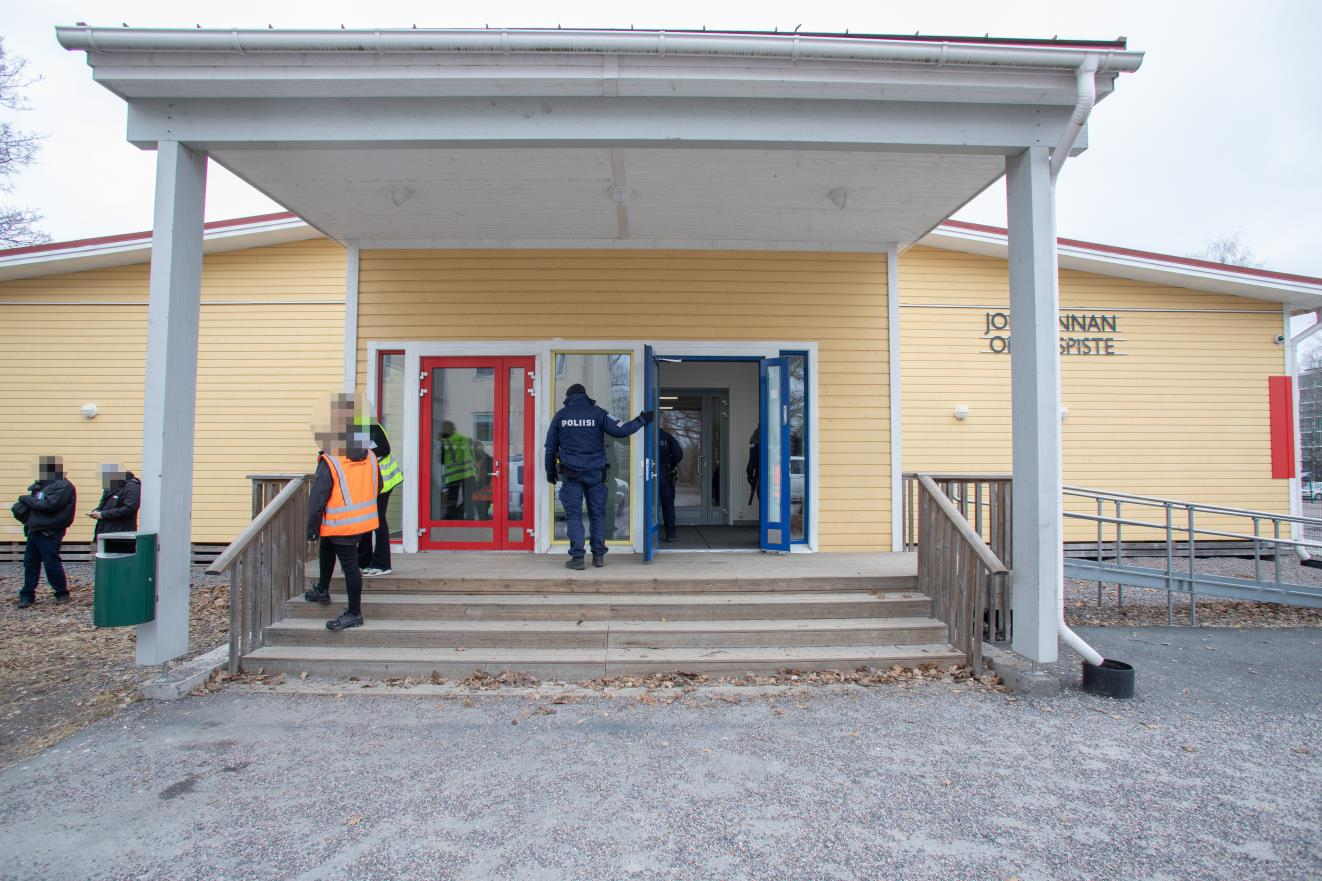
- Police outside the school after the shooting
- Native name: Viertolan koulusurma (Finnish); Skolskjutningen i Bäckby (Swedish)
- Location: 60.28972°N 25.018568°E; Viertola school, Jokiranta site, Vantaa, Finland
- Date: 2 April 2024; 9:00 – 9:01 a.m. (EEST GMT+3)
- Target: 15 students of the Viertola school
- Attack type: School shooting
- Weapon: .22 caliber Herter's Waseca single-action revolver
- Deaths: 1
- Injuries: 2
- Perpetrator: 12-year old boy
- Motive: Revenge for alleged bullying
- Convictions: Perpetrator: None, under the age of criminal responsibility. Grandfather of Perpetrator: Failure to keep the weapon secured.
- Sentence: 6 months suspended imprisonment

On 2 April 2024, a shooting occurred at the Viertola school, Jokiranta site in Vantaa, Finland. The gunman, a 12-year-old fired a revolver at three students, all aged 12. One victim was killed while two were seriously injured.

== Background ==
Gun ownership in Finland is closely linked to hunting and target practice. According to the Finnish Interior Ministry, there are more than 1.5 million licensed firearms in Finland, with around 430,000 licensed gun owners. That is equivalent to about 8% of the Finnish population. Finnish law provides no limit to the number of guns that can be owned per person. If the amount of personal firearms exceeds the amount of five, or if a firearm is classified as ”highly dangerous”, such as a semi-automatic pistol with a high capacity magazine, the weapons need to be "stored in such a way that they cannot easily be stolen". The age limit for a gun license in Finland is 18 years of age. Minors over the age of 15 can legally be permitted to use other people's firearms. The age limit for revolvers, which was the weapon used in the shooting, is set at 20 years of age.

Previous fatal school shootings in 2007 and 2008 led to a raised minimum age for gun ownership and increased background checks for prospective gun owners. It prompted the establishment of a "system of pre-emptive measures" allowing police to intervene if they received information on an "intent to stage an attack". An aptitude test for all gun licence applicants was introduced in 2010.

Bullying in Finland is regarded as widespread. Studies show that 8.6% of children between the ages of 10 and 11 experience bullying on a weekly basis.

== Shooting ==
A 12-year old entered a sixth-grade classroom wearing a mask and noise-cancelling headphones and exclaimed "Now the bullying ends!" before shooting three of his classmates. Police arrived at the scene at 09:17. A lockdown was implemented inside the school and in nearby educational institutions.

Immediately after the shooting, a teacher arrived at the scene. The teacher managed to convince the shooter to leave the classroom. After fleeing on foot, he fired several shots in the air, including one at a parked car. The police eventually found the shooter in the North Helsinki neighborhood of Siltamäki and took him into custody at 09:58. The revolver used in the attack was recovered as the police caught up with the shooter.

Of the three victims, one was a boy and the other two were girls. The boy died immediately from being shot. The victims were all Finnish, but one of the girls was a dual citizen of Finland and Kosovo. One of the surviving victims was discharged from hospital on 11 April.

== Investigation ==
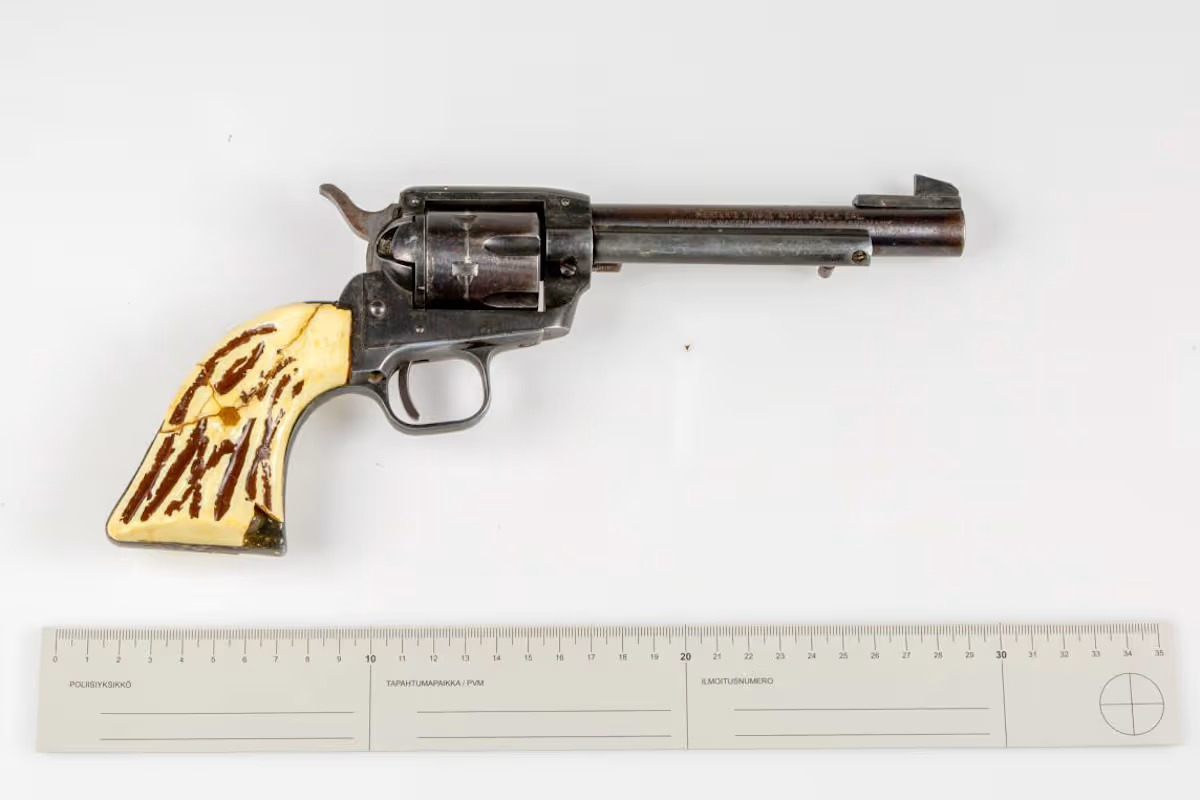
The murder weapon

The police initially stated that the motive for the shooting was bullying. The Finnish broadcasting company Yle reported that a twelve-year-old had confessed to shooting the three students. The shooter reportedly stated that he had been bullied at school. However, subsequent investigations by the police have not shown any evidence of bullying, nor by the victims targeted. The shooter had transferred to the school at the beginning of the semester. Due to the shooter being a minor, he will not face criminal charges in accordance to Finnish law. The shooter was placed in the care of social services. National Police Commissioner Seppo Kolehmainen stated that law enforcement had not received any information on an impending attack prior to the shooting.

The shooter reportedly enjoyed using the internet to watch people die in videos. He also had a target list consisting of fifteen names. In an r/AskReddit thread which asked users to predict their manner of death, the shooter answered "being shot by police". The shooter had also researched the Jokela, Kauhajoki, Uvalde, Suzano and Columbine school shootings.

The gun used in the crime was a .22 caliber Herter's Waseca single-action revolver, an inexpensive gun modelled after the Colt Single Action Army, which was given to the perpetrator by his grandfather.

== Reactions ==
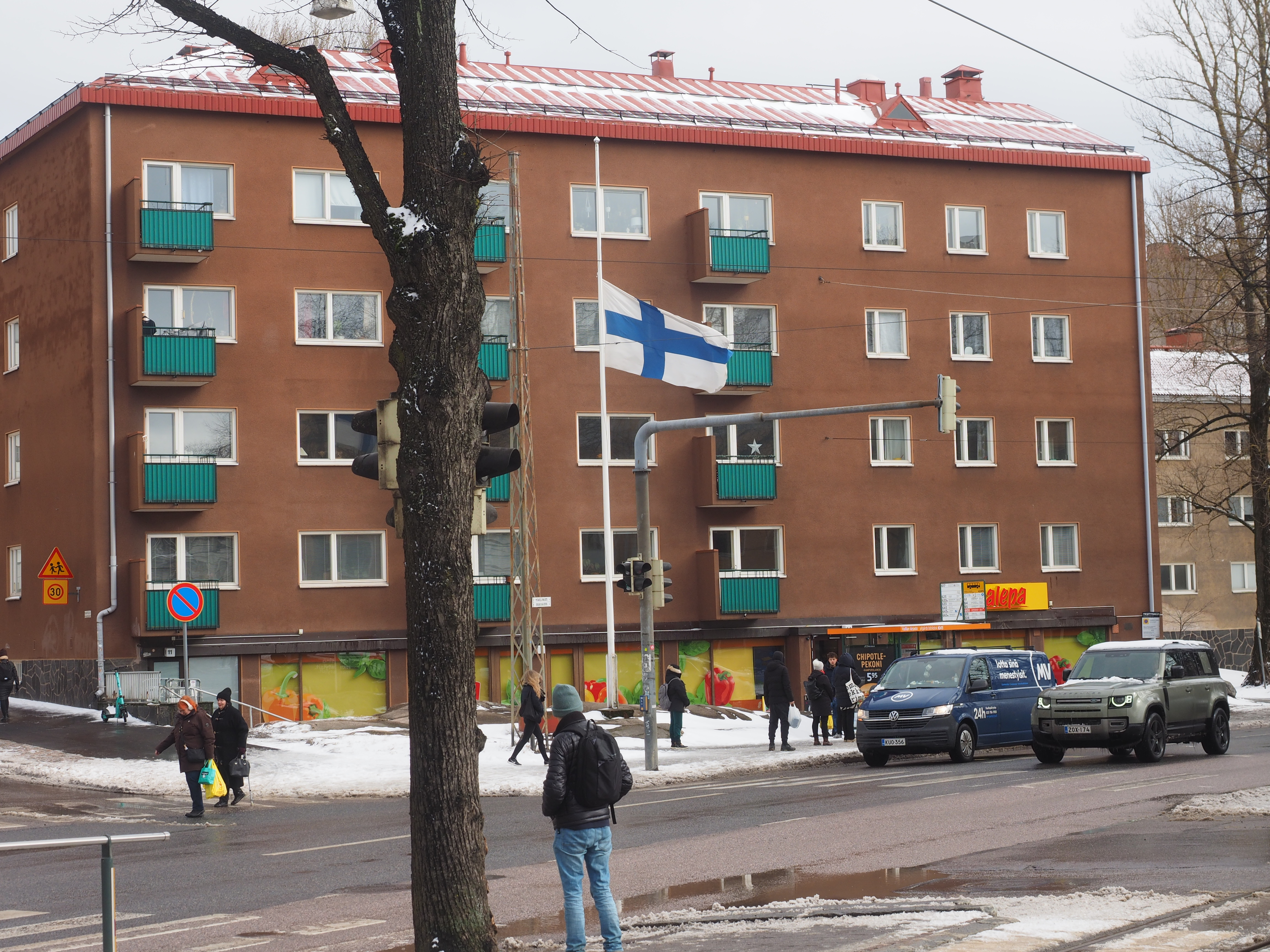
The Finnish flag lowered to half mast at Mäkelänkatu in Vallila, Helsinki, Finland. Photo taken on the afternoon of April 3rd 2024, one day after the shooting.

Following the shooting, some called for the age of criminal responsibility, which is currently at 15 years of age, to be lowered.

The Viertola school reopened on 3 April on reduced hours, with crisis counselling sessions on offer. A national day of mourning was held on the 3rd of April, during which the flag of Finland was placed at half-mast. Flowers and candles were laid down at the site of the attack. Official discussions about the shooting were held in schools across Vantaa. Students who witnessed the shooting would be having their lessons in a different building at the school.

Prime Minister Petteri Orpo described the shooting as "deeply upsetting". He stated, that mental health issues of the Finnish youth must be tackled. President Alexander Stubb also expressed shock at the shooting. He offered condolences to the families of the victims while wishing them a speedy recovery. Education Minister Anna-Maja Henriksson tearfully described the shooting as a "great tragedy". She stated, that her thoughts were with the "12-year-old who will never come home from school again". Interior Minister Mari Rantanen wrote on Twitter (X) that she "can only imagine the pain and worry that many families are experiencing at the moment." Deputy Prime Minister Riikka Purra, referring to the shooting stated, that "these kinds of incidents should never happen." Leader of the Left Alliance and former Education Minister Li Andersson also described the incident as a major shock. King Carl XVI Gustaf of Sweden and Swedish Prime Minister Ulf Kristersson sent messages of condolence to Finnish President Alexander Stubb and Prime Minister Petteri Orpo following the school attack in Vantaa. King Gustaf and Prime Minister Kristersson stated that Sweden stands with the Finnish people.

== Legal proceedings ==
The police treated the incident as one count of murder and two counts of attempted murder, as well as one count of an illegal threat. The legal owner of the handgun used in the shooting, the perpetrator's grandfather, was charged with a firearms offence.

January 2026 reports stated that the Eastern Uusimaa District Court had approved a settlement between the Viertola school shooter and two of his teachers regarding compensation for suffering. Under the agreement, the boy was ordered to pay €6,000 in compensation for pain and suffering to the art teacher, as well as €5,200 to the class teacher for mental anguish and just over €1,330 for loss of earnings. The teachers had originally sought more than €34,000 in compensation. During the incident, the boy had pointed his firearm at both teachers. The court held that the teachers were entitled to compensation because they had feared for their lives while inside the classroom.

At the end of February 2026, Iltalehti reported that the girl who had been more seriously injured in the school shooting was seeking €40,000 in compensation for pain and suffering from the shooter. According to the newspaper, she argued that the amount was justified by the exceptional brutality and cruelty of the act. The claim also noted that the shooting had taken place at a school, which should be a safe place for a child, and emphasized that the girl had done nothing to provoke the attack.

In May 2026, the Eastern Uusimaa District Court sentenced the 69-year-old grandfather of the shooter, who lived in Myrskylä, to six months' suspended imprisonment for a firearms offence after he had allowed the 12-year-old access to the revolver used in the shooting without proper supervision.

== See also ==
- List of school attacks in Finland
- Raumanmeri school shooting
- Jokela school shooting
- Kauhajoki school shooting
- Kuopio school stabbing
- List of youngest killers
