= Jokela school shooting =

2007 school shooting in Tuusula, Finland

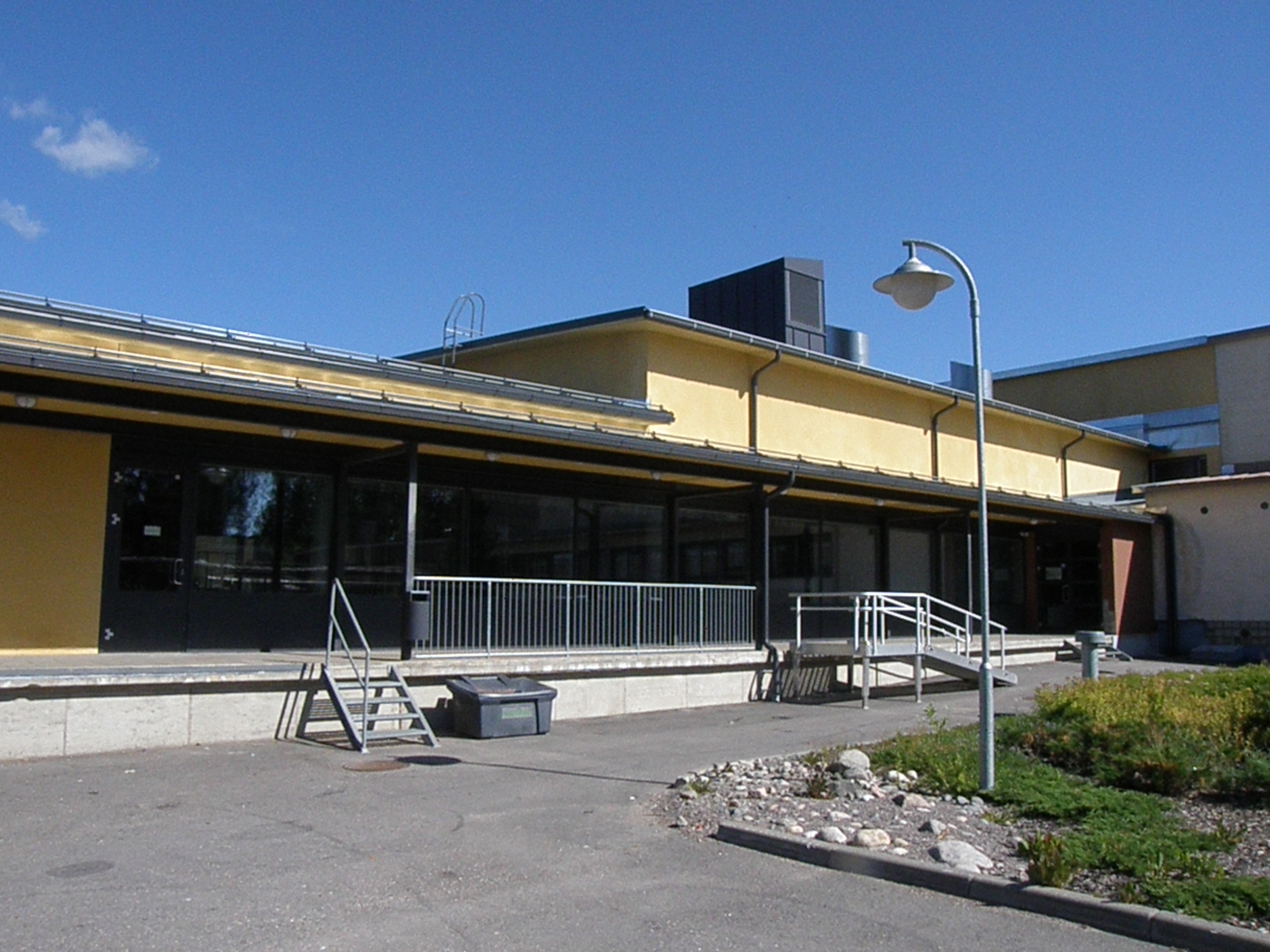
- Jokela High School's yard
- Native name: Jokelan koulusurmat (Finnish); Skolskjutningen i Jokela (Swedish)
- Location: 60°32′56″N 024°57′49″E; Jokela, Tuusula, Finland
- Date: 7 November 2007; 19 years ago 11:42 – 12:04 (UTC+2)
- Target: Students and staff at Jokela High School
- Attack type: School shooting, mass shooting, mass murder, murder–suicide, attempted arson
- Weapons: .22LR SIG Sauer Mosquito semi-automatic pistol; Two-stroke engine fuel; Knife (unused)
- Deaths: 9 (including the perpetrator)
- Injuries: 13 (1 by gunfire)
- Perpetrator: Pekka-Eric Auvinen
- Motive: Misanthropy; Retaliation for bullying; Social Darwinism; Political terrorism; Columbine High School massacre copycat crime

On 7 November 2007, a mass shooting occurred at Jokela High School in the town of Jokela, Tuusula, Finland. The gunman, 18-year-old Pekka-Eric Auvinen, entered the school that morning armed with a semi-automatic pistol. He killed eight people and wounded one before shooting himself in the head; twelve others were also injured by flying glass or by spraining their ankles during the ensuing chaos. Auvinen died later that evening in a Helsinki hospital.

This was the second school shooting in the history of Finland, the first being the Raumanmeri school shooting in 1989, when a 14-year-old fatally shot two fellow students. The attack is the second-deadliest school shooting in Finnish history. Less than one year after the Jokela school massacre, the Kauhajoki school shooting occurred, which is thought to have been heavily inspired by Auvinen.

== Preparations ==
=== Obtaining the gun ===
Auvinen had received his gun licence in October, then purchased a .22-calibre SIG Sauer Mosquito and 500 rounds of ammunition on 2 November, five days before the shooting. He was a registered member of the Helsinki Shooting Club since 31 August. A club spokesman revealed that Auvinen had attended a single one-hour training session. He had been given the licence since he was a member of a local shooting club and held no previous criminal record.

The Finnish police require a shooting hobby to begin with a .22-calibre weapon. Auvinen initially wanted to purchase a 9mm Glock pistol, but the application was rejected by police on 12 October under the grounds that, due to its high firepower, the firearm was not suited for precision shooting, as Auvinen had hoped to use it for. He later successfully filed an application to purchase a .22-calibre Ruger MK III pistol, only to find on the day of the purchase that it was unavailable at the time. He then opted to purchase the SIG Sauer Mosquito instead, which he named “Catherine”.

Auvinen uploaded a video to YouTube prior to the shooting, declaring that he would carry out a "massacre", and uploaded a manifesto to a file-sharing website. His manifesto expressed anger at his social alienation and called on "strong-minded and intelligent individuals" to revolt against the "idiocracy" of the "weak-minded masses".

=== Weaponry ===
After Auvinen received his gun licence in October 2007, he purchased a .22-calibre SIG Sauer Mosquito and 500 rounds of ammunition on 2 November 2007, five days before the shooting. Auvinen also used two-stroke engine fuel during the shooting in a failed attempt to set the school on fire.

=== File package ===
Before setting off on his rampage, Auvinen uploaded a file package containing twenty-one media files to the Internet. It contained pictures of himself, his firearm, Jokela High School, one undisclosed music file, and three documents in Finnish and English.

==== Natural Selector's Manifesto ====
The longest text was the Natural Selector's Manifesto, in which Auvinen explained his thoughts and rationale behind the shooting. He emphasized that he wanted his attack to be seen as not a mere school shooting but an outright act of terrorism. The text is an amalgamation of Auvinen's favourite philosophers, including Plato and Friedrich Nietzsche, and also contains references to Industrial Society and Its Future and Eric Harris, one of the perpetrators of the Columbine High School massacre. Auvinen proclaimed himself a "natural selector" who sought to eliminate what he considered weaknesses in humanity. In the manifesto, he refers to his attack as a war against the "weak-minded masses". Auvinen's manifesto contains Nazi and ecofascist themes.

== Shooting ==
At approximately 11:40, Pekka-Eric Auvinen entered Jokela High School's ground-floor main hallway, having missed his first lesson. He encountered a student in the corridor and killed him at 11:42, then hid in the restroom. Some students heard the sound of gunshots but did not recognise them. Soon after, other students found the victim's body but assumed he was rendered unconscious from a bump to his head. Auvinen then fatally shot two more students, one of whom recognised him, from the restroom doorway. The school nurse then came to the scene, asking the students to flee the school, and afterwards, called emergency services. After shooting and killing another student outside the restroom, Auvinen ran after the nurse, caught up to her, and fatally shot her and another student at 11:46. At this point, Auvinen had claimed the lives of six people, therefore most of the shooting victims were killed within the first four minutes.

At 11:47, head teacher Helena Kalmi was alerted to the shooting by the deputy head teacher. She immediately ordered all students and teachers via PA system to barricade themselves inside their classrooms. After this, Auvinen began shouting and firing randomly, discharging his gun a total of 53 times in the corridors. At one point, he encountered the mother of a student as she was entering the school but spared her. Auvinen then attempted to enter a classroom, shooting three times through the barricaded door and hitting a student in the toe. Auvinen then moved on to the school's second floor and found two students, who did not hear the head teacher's announcement, sitting on a bench in the corridor. While one escaped uninjured, the other was shot and killed.

Auvinen began pouring two-stroke engine fuel (a petrol and oil mixture) on corridor walls and floors, but he was not able to ignite the fuel. He then went to the school canteen on the first floor and tried to enter, but the sliding glass doors were locked. After demanding to be let in, Auvinen fired through the glass, hitting some chairs inside. People hiding in the canteen were able to escape through the other end of the room and hid in the rooms behind the kitchen. No one in the canteen was injured.

At 11:54, Kalmi left the school with the education welfare officer and stopped between the building and a nearby pond to talk on the telephone. The education welfare officer went on ahead to the car park to guide rescue vehicles into the area. Auvinen, cursing, emerged from the school and encountered Kalmi, who tried to convince him to surrender. At 11:57, he shot her seven times in view of a group of students in the schoolyard, fatally wounding her.

Auvinen re-entered the school, went back to the first floor, and began walking around, knocking on classroom doors. He then managed to enter an occupied comprehensive-school classroom. Inside, he shouted orders at some of the students, proclaimed a revolution, and urged the students to destroy school property. Despite firing two shots at a television set and a window, Auvinen left the classroom without shooting anyone.

A few minutes later, Auvinen spotted the first responding police officers and paramedics converging at the area of the inner court. He fired a shot at them through a window, but the bullet failed to penetrate the glass. At 12:03, Auvinen took another position near the main entrance and fired two more shots at police officers who tried to approach and negotiate with him. No officers were hit. Soon afterwards, he walked into the restroom next to the canteen and threw his jacket and bag on the floor. After that, Auvinen shot himself in the head, ending the shooting at 12:04. Police found Auvinen laying on the floor of the bathroom and he was taken to the Töölö campus of Helsinki University Central Hospital at 14:45, where he died at 22:15 from the gunshot wound. The victims all sustained multiple injuries to the upper body and head.

=== Emergency response ===
The first emergency services call was reported at 11:43:14 by a student, though it was initially reported that the victim in question was bleeding from a bump on his head. The operator alerted two ambulances at 11:44:11. During the alert, gunshots were heard in the background, but the operator either did not hear them or was unable to identify them. The caller then tried to inform the operator that there was someone with a gun, but he was in a state of panic at the time and the operator could not understand the situation. At 11:46:38, it was finally determined that a shooter was involved, and the incident was reclassified as a shooting.

Police patrols were alerted, and the first officers arrived at the scene at 11:55 to begin evacuating students and staff from the building. Ambulances also arrived at the same time. In addition to officers from the local police department, officers from the Central Uusimaa, Hyvinkää, and Vantaa police departments, along with officers from a special readiness unit, were involved in the police response. The medical response consisted of a total of twelve ambulance units, along with two rescue units and a medical helicopter.

Despite reports of only one gunman, the police realised the information was not definite and considered the possibility of multiple assailants. They converged on the inner court, where they believed three or four victims were located according to information given by students, but found no bodies there. Meanwhile, between 12:05 and 12:15, a patrol blockading the pool beside the school building found Kalmi, alive but badly wounded. Basic life support was initiated on her, but despite these efforts she died of her injuries at the scene.

Between 12:35 and 12:37, an estimated 200 students and staff were evacuated from the school and relocated to a nearby centre. Readiness unit officers entered the school, and by 13:38, they found six of the victims, four in the hallway and the other two on a corridor stairway. At 13:54, they found Auvinen's body next to a men's lavatory near the canteen. Signs of life were detected, and he was moved out of the building to receive first aid. At 13:58, the officers found the last victim on the school's second floor. They believed he was still alive and moved him out of the school to receive first aid, but a doctor determined that the victim had already died by the time he was found.

By 14:29, the school was cleared, and no additional gunmen were found. A second inspection of the building was initiated for final confirmation, and the last students were evacuated by 15:17. The second inspection was completed at 15:40.

=== Victims ===
All of the following were killed in the shooting (excluding the perpetrator):

- Sameli "Same" Nurmi, male, 17 (student)
- Mika Petteri Pulkkinen, male, 17 (student)
- Ari Juhani Palsanen, male, 18 (student)
- Hanna Katariina Laaksonen Kinnunen, female, 25 (student)
- Sirkka Anneli Kaarakka, female, 43 (nurse)
- Mikko Tapani "Mikkous" Hiltunen, male, 17 (student)
- Ville Valtteri "Viltsi" Heinonen, male, 16 (student)
- Helena Kalmi, female, 61 (head teacher/principal)

== Perpetrator ==
Pekka-Eric Auvinen

Pekka-Eric Auvinen was born on 4 June 1989 in Helsinki, Uusimaa, Finland. His father, a musician, named him after the guitarists Pekka Järvinen and Eric Clapton. Auvinen grew up in a stable family consisting of his parents and a younger brother. His parents reportedly became concerned about the violent content of some of the video games he played and confiscated and sold them. The family had lived in the same home for a decade. During his early school years, Auvinen developed normally and had friends. However, during adolescence, his academic performance declined and his social circle became increasingly limited. Auvinen reportedly had no friends in his later school years, although he discussed firearms and the possibility of carrying out a school shooting with others.

Between December 2006 and January 2007, Auvinen's parents tried to get him referred to a psychiatric outpatient clinic for his depression and anxiety, but the offer was refused due to his perceived mild symptoms. Instead, treatment using antidepressants was recommended to Auvinen's parents before any attempts to hospitalize him. Auvinen would go on to tell his online acquaintance that he would not be making it to military service the following months, leaving several other cryptic and homicidal messages with her the day before his attack. Auvinen had irregularly taken SSRIs one year prior to his death. Auvinen was frequently bullied at school and school students reported changes in his behavior to a youth worker, saying he acted threateningly and remarked that they would die in "a white revolution". One of his teachers described him as a militant radical who was interested in both far-right and far-left movements. Auvinen had apparently been planning the shooting since at least early March 2006 before he met any of the YouTubers or online gamers who had later been blamed for the massacre.

=== Online activity ===
Auvinen had a number of online accounts, including two YouTube accounts under the aliases of "Sturmgeist89" and "NaturalSelector89" on which he uploaded videos about school shootings and violent incidents, including the Columbine High School massacre. In some of Auvinen's videos, he wears a T-shirt bearing the slogan "Humanity is Overrated"; he also posted videos attacking religion. Shortly before the shooting, Auvinen posted a video of him displaying his weapon and shooting at apples. Before the attack, he posted his final video titled "Jokela High School Massacre - 11/7/2007". The video began with a picture of the Jokela High School before it faded to red-filtered pictures depicting himself holding a firearm. The song "Stray Bullet" by KMFDM is played in the background throughout the entire video.

Several months before the shooting, an American YouTuber, TJ Kirk (better known as The Amazing Atheist), called for authorities to investigate accounts with content on school shootings, including Auvinen's. Auvinen often liked playing violent video games, such as Hitman: Codename 47, Hitman 2: Silent Assassin, Super Columbine Massacre RPG!, and Battlefield 2.

== Criminal investigation ==
The police found a total of 75 casings and 327 unused rounds of ammunition at the scene. Flammable liquid was found poured on the walls and floors of the second floor, suggesting that Auvinen had attempted to set the school on fire. They also found Auvinen's suicide note and began analyzing his Internet postings. A 2,000-page police report into the shooting was released in April 2008.

== Government responses ==
=== Finnish government ===
Flags were flown at half-staff on 8 November throughout the country by officials and private entities alike, and the Finnish government held a moment of silence while in session. Prime Minister Matti Vanhanen sent "his government's heartfelt condolences", strongly noting the need for the media, parents and schools to discuss the incident in the correct light. The Finnish National Board of Education immediately posted directions for the teachers and principals on how to discuss the shootings with pupils, along with shorter instructions for parents. President Tarja Halonen sent her condolences as well. The Evangelical Lutheran Church of Finland opened a crisis centre, situated in the Church of Jokela, in which professional help was administered to those afflicted by the tragedy. A number of groups appeared on IRC-Gallery and Facebook to grieve or commemorate the victims

The Lutheran Archbishop Jukka Paarma of Turku, the Orthodox Archbishop Leo of Karelia, the Catholic Bishop Józef Wróbel of Helsinki and other church authorities expressed their condolences to the relatives and loved ones of those who died in the massacre. Throughout the country, church buildings were opened for anyone seeking pastoral care; the incident was a major topic in religious services, many of which were specifically held because of the incident.

On 9 November 2007, the Finnish government decided to drop objections to the European Union directive on firearms. This mandated a common European minimum age limit of 18 years for gun ownership. After the decision was announced, interior minister Anne Holmlund commented through her aide that it was not a direct consequence of the shootings, as the directive had been prepared for a long time and "wouldn't have prevented the events anyway."

On 13 November, the Finnish government announced that it would set up a "Commission of Inquiry to investigate the Jokela school shooting and events that bear relevance to the incident". The investigation report was released in February 2009.

According to the Finnish Ministry of Justice, a legislative process aimed at establishing an enabling act covering the terms of an official investigative commission would be finalised by the end of March 2008. The plan was to have a final report, covering the Jokela school shooting incident, finalised in one year.

=== International governments and organisations ===
- Estonia: President Toomas Hendrik Ilves sent a message of condolences on behalf of the Estonian people to President Halonen, saying he had been shocked and saddened by the news.
- Iceland: President Ólafur Ragnar Grímsson sent a message of condolences on behalf of the Icelandic people to Finnish President Tarja Halonen. "On behalf of myself and the Icelandic people, I wish to express our condolences to the Finnish people for the tragic event in Tuusula earlier today."
- Ireland: President Mary McAleese, Taoiseach Bertie Ahern and a number of Irish schoolchildren expressed their condolences to Finnish President Tarja Halonen on 12 November during Halonen's state visit to the country.
- Norway: King Harald V sent a message of condolences to Finnish President Tarja Halonen. "It is with deep sorrow that I have received the news of the tragedy at the Jokela secondary school in Tusby yesterday, which resulted in such a meaningless loss of lives. I send you my heartfelt condolences and my sincerest sympathies to all the bereaved and the Finnish people."
- Sweden: King Carl XVI Gustaf expressed his condolences and described the shooting as a horrific affair.

"Unfortunately this sort of thing is spreading around the world. That is odd," the king added at a news conference in Luleå. The Swedish TV channel SVT 2 would also show the movie Elephant, a movie whose general theme is a school shooting, the day after the massacre, but they took it off the schedule in respect to Finland. Instead, the movie Swimming Pool was shown.
- European Union: President of the European Commission José Manuel Barroso said in a message to the Finnish prime minister Matti Vanhanen that he had been "shocked and profoundly saddened to learn about the horrific campus murders."

== Copycat crimes ==
=== In Finland ===
- On 9 November 2007, the Finnish police rushed to three schools due to threats of attacks posted on the Internet. One of the schools was Hyrylä high school in Tuusula and the others in Kirkkonummi and Maaninka. The 16-year-old boy who posted a video titled "Maaninka massacre" on YouTube was arrested on 11 November. The suspect has stated that the video was a joke.
- Three weeks after the Jokela shootings, the Finnish police, flooded with hoax threats, made a public plea for threats against schools to cease. The police reminded prospective perpetrators of severe judicial consequences as well as of the feelings of the families touched by the Jokela events.
- The Kauhajoki school shooting occurred on 23 September 2008, at Seinäjoki University of Applied Sciences in Kauhajoki, a town in the former province of Western Finland. The gunman, 22-year-old culinary arts student Matti Juhani Saari, shot and fatally injured ten people with a semi-automatic pistol before shooting himself in the head. He died a few hours later in Tampere University Hospital. Finnish police first stated that Saari "very likely" knew Pekka-Eric Auvinen, but in the final investigation no proof of that was found.
- On 15 March 2024, the fifth anniversary of the Christchurch mosque shooting Finnish army Alikersantti Evita Kolmonen was arrested for allegedly planning a mass shooting in a highschool in Isokyrö that day. As her motivation, she said the world needed "a mass culling" to put an end to "selfish individualism", "human degeneration", global warming and conspicuous consumption. The Finnish police described her as ecofascist and that she had read books by Nietzsche, Pentti Linkola and Ted Kaczynski. Additionally, she had praised Pekka-Eric Auvinen in internet conversations and had even visited Jokela High School. During the court proceedings, a bomb threat was called against the Vaasa Court of Appeal hearing her case. Kolmonen was convicted on 15 January 2025 of a firearm offense and planning an aggravated crime against life and health, and sentenced to three years and two months in prison.

=== Elsewhere ===
- Shortly after the mass murder, two boys, aged 16 and 17, were arrested in Stockholm, Sweden, for conspiring to murder their school's principal and janitor. According to the principal, "they had spoken about and glorified Columbine High and what happened in Finland."
- On 12 August 2024, at least five people were wounded in a mass stabbing attack in Eskişehir, Turkey. The perpetrator had called for "Total Human Death" and voiced support for Ted Kaczynski, Auvinen and accelerationism on the Internet.
- Natalie Rupnow, the perpetrator of the 16 December 2024 Abundant Life Christian School shooting in the United States, called Auvinen "one true ideal of the so-called future" and included photos of him in her manifesto.
- Robin Westman, the perpetrator of the 27 August 2025 Annunciation Catholic Church shooting, had written "Auvinen" on one of their guns.
- Hernán Meneses Leal, the suspect in the 27 March 2026 Calama school stabbing, Chile, was discovered to have Auvinen's name written on one of his bladed weapons. Shortly before the attack, he had also uploaded a video referencing Jokela.

== Popular culture ==
Pekka. Inside the Mind of a School Shooter is a 2014 documentary-drama directed by Alexander Oey about Auvinen and the Jokela school shooting. The documentary contains interviews with Auvinen's parents, classmates, and teachers.

== See also ==
- Gun politics in Finland
- List of school-related attacks
- Kauhajoki school shooting
- Raumanmeri school shooting
- Kuopio school stabbing
- Viertola school shooting
- 2014 Helsinki University massacre plan
