= Jokela =

Village in Tuusula, Finland

- Urban area
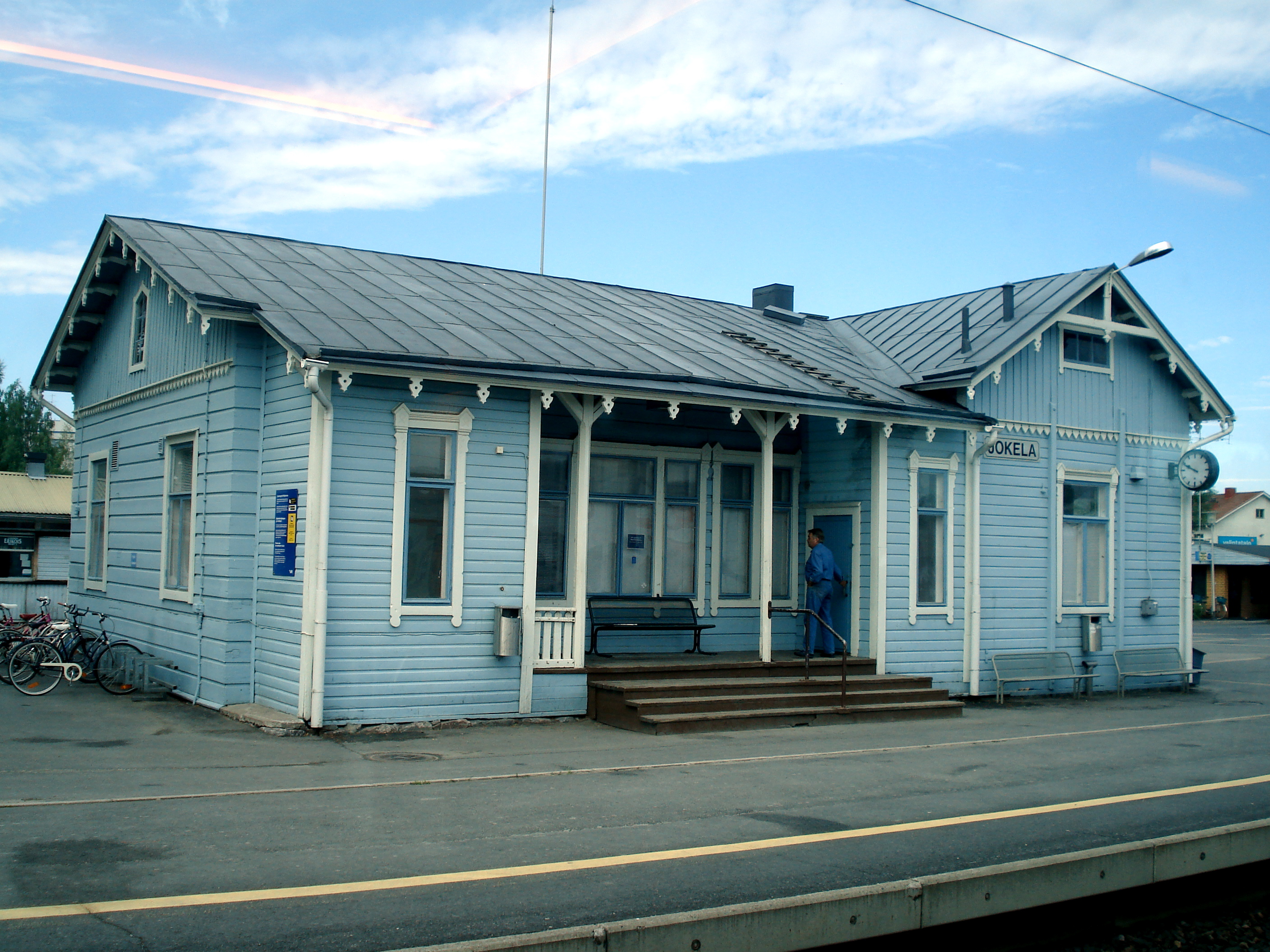
- Jokela railway station
- Interactive map of Jokela
- Coordinates: 60°33′10″N 24°57′59″E
- Country: Finland
- Region: Uusimaa
- Municipality: Tuusula

Area
  - Total: 10.51 km^{2} (4.06 sq mi)

Population (2021-12-31)
  - Total: 6,574
- Time zone: UTC+2 (EET)
  - Summer (DST): UTC+3 (EEST)
- Postal code: 05400

Jokela (Finnish pronunciation: [ˈjokelɑ]) is one of the three administrative centers in the Finnish municipality Tuusula. It has a population of around 6,000 residents. The Jokela high school and the Jokela railway station serve the community. Many residents commute to the capital of Finland, Helsinki, which is about 50 kilometres (30 mi) away. The Jokela Prison, opened in 1993, is also located in the village.

== History ==
=== Early settlement ===
Until the mid-19th century the area around Jokela was scarcely populated. The development of Jokela began with the opening of a railway line in 1862. In 1874 the railway station was built and the first brick factory was founded. Several other brick factories would later follow to meet the needs of the rapidly growing capital as well as a match factory next to Jokela manor. The industrial development increased population: in 1920 there were 570 inhabitants and by 1950 1,617.

=== Rail crash ===
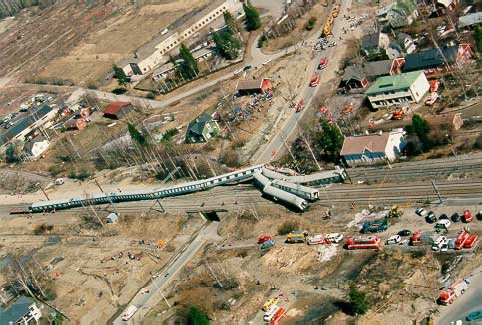
The community after the rail crash

On 21 April 1996 a rail accident occurred where four people were killed and 75 injured when express train P82 from Oulu bound for Helsinki derailed in heavy fog. There was a strict speed limit due to a bridge construction which P82 failed to heed. It is estimated that the total cost of the accident was over €4.3 million.

=== School shooting ===
A school shooting occurred in the town on 7 November 2007. At approximately 11:44 local time (9:44 UTC) Pekka-Eric Auvinen opened fire at Jokela High School. The incident resulted in the deaths of nine people: five male pupils and one female pupil; the school principal; the school nurse; and the shooter himself, who was also one of the school's pupils. Hours before the incident, the shooter posted a video on YouTube predicting the massacre at the school. A day after the shooting, a picture of Auvinen holding a gun and a message he would "kill people at jokela high school today in the name of anonymous" was posted on the imageboard 4chan. It has been stated by the Finnish police that they could not find a connection between Auvinen and "Anonymous".

It was the second of four school shootings that have occurred in Finland. The previous incident occurred in 1989 at the Raumanmeri school in Rauma, when a 14-year-old fatally shot two fellow students. On 23 September 2008, 11 people were killed in the Kauhajoki school shooting.

== Sports ==
The following sports clubs are located in Jokela:

- Derius
- Jokelan Kisa

== See also ==
- Hyvinkää
- Kellokoski
- Nukari
