= Jokela High School =

Public secondary school in Tuusula, Finland

Coordinates: 60°32′56″N 24°57′49″E

- Finnish: Jokelan koulukeskus
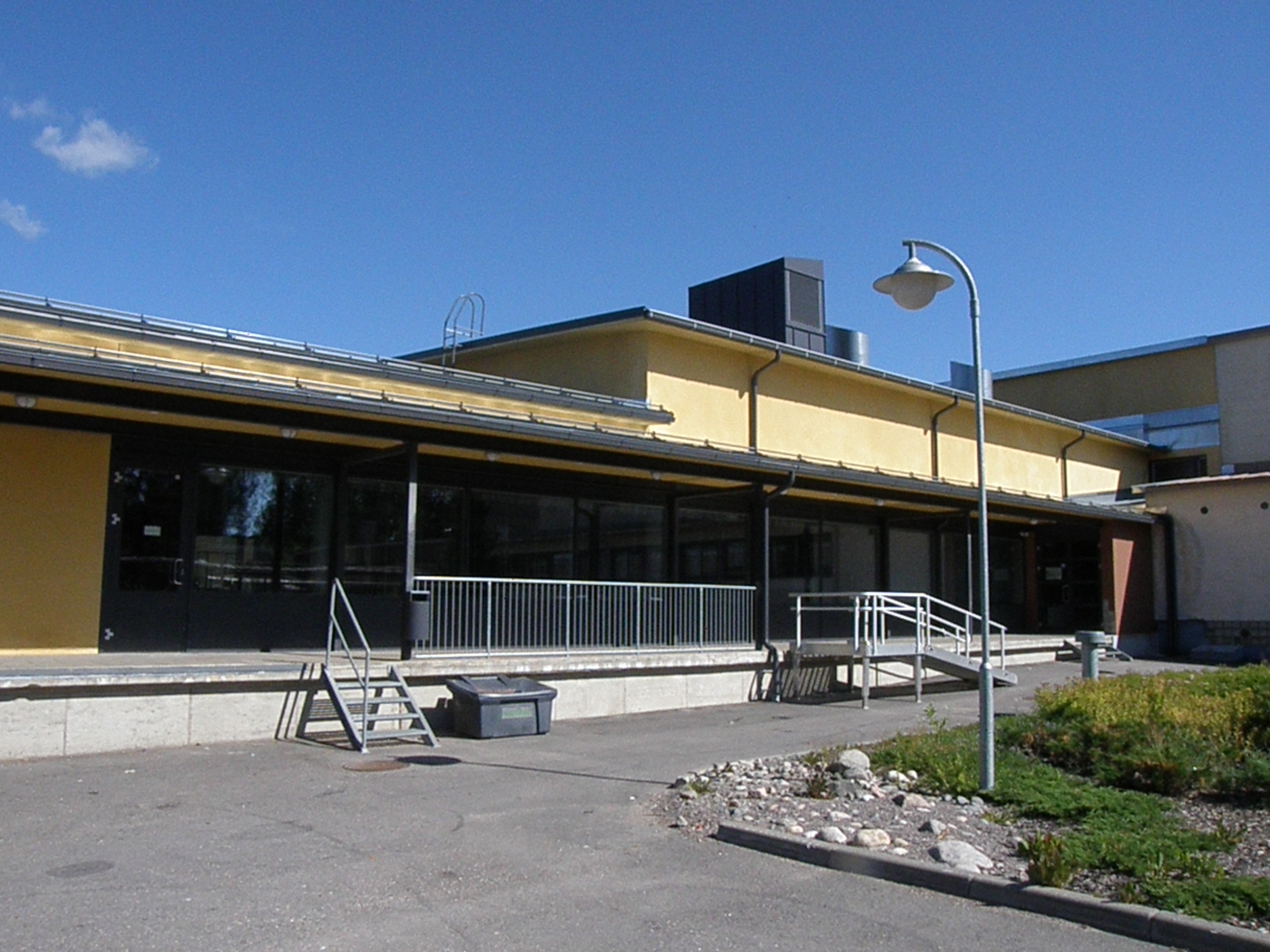
- A picture of the schoolyard

Information
- Enrollment: c.450

Jokela High School is a public secondary school in Jokela School Centre (Finnish: Jokelan koulukeskus) in the village of Jokela, Tuusula municipality, Finland. It is located 43 kilometres outside the capital Helsinki. The school educates about 450 pupils. Jokela School Centre also houses grades 7–9.

== School shooting ==
The school was the site of one of only four Finnish school shootings. On 7 November 2007, at approximately 11:44 local time (9:44 UTC) Pekka-Eric Auvinen opened fire at Jokela High School. The incident resulted in the death of nine people: five male pupils and one female pupil; the school principal; the school nurse; and the shooter himself, who was also one of the school's pupils. Hours before the incident, the shooter posted a video on YouTube predicting the massacre at the school. Jokela High School reopened on 15 November 2007.
