= 2019 Kuopio college stabbing =

Mass stabbing in Finland

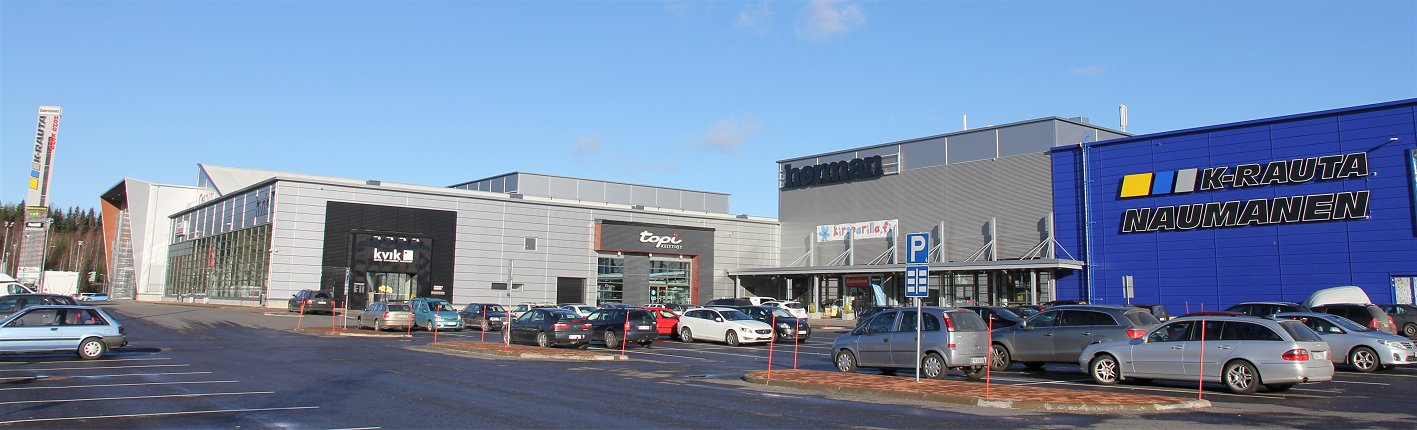
- Campus at the Herman Shopping Center in Levänen
- Location: Kuopio, North Savo, Finland
- Date: 1 October 2019 c. 12:27 – 12:37
- Target: Students and staff at the Savo Vocational College
- Attack type: Mass stabbing, school attack, arson
- Weapons: Longsword; Air pistol (failed to fire); Knife (unused); Gasoline; Molotov cocktails (unused)
- Deaths: 1
- Injuries: 12 (including the perpetrator)
- Perpetrator: Joel Otto Aukusti Marin
- Motive: Hatred towards society

On 1 October 2019, 24-year-old student Joel Otto Aukusti Marin fatally stabbed a female student and wounded 11 others at Savo Vocational College, located in the premises of Herman Shopping Center in Kuopio, North Savo, Finland. Armed with a longsword, Marin killed a female student and wounded eleven others. He also carried an air pistol which was not used during the attack; it was initially mistaken for a real firearm. The attack ended when a policewoman shot and wounded Marin.

== Attack ==
On the morning of the attack at approximately 9:00, Marin arrived on a bicycle to a post office adjacent to a supermarket. He entered the supermarket first and purchased several items: a 2 kg grain-fed pork neck, scissors, paper clips, an Ultra Red Monster Energy drink, a Red Bull, and two Erdinger beer bottles. After purchasing the items, Marin entered the post office to pick up a longsword he purchased online. He would leave the post office at 9:17.

At his apartment, Marin shredded his bank card and destroyed his computer's hard drive. He also tested his longsword on the pork neck he purchased before leaving it in his fridge. At 12:25, Marin arrived at the Savo Vocational College, located in the premises of the Herman shopping mall.

The attack began in a computer lab classroom. At the time of the attack, 18 students and one teacher were in the classroom. Marin knocked on the door to the classroom and was let in by the teacher. Students in the classroom described how Marin arrived to class with a "long bag", took out a longsword and began stabbing people. Marin began the attack by striking the teacher multiple times with his sword. He then turned towards the students and began attacking them as they tried to flee. Marin stabbed nine of the students, killing one, while nine other students escaped the classroom unharmed. A male teacher walking in the hallway noticed several people fleeing from the classroom that was being attacked. He entered the doorway and noticed Marin repeatedly stabbing a woman with his sword. The male teacher called out to Marin, which caught his attention. Marin approached the male teacher and struck his wrist with the sword. The male teacher ran out of the classroom along with the woman who was attacked by Marin. The mortally wounded woman collapsed in the hallway. Several teachers tried to carry her, but Marin scared them off. The woman who collapsed would turn out to be the only fatality in the attack. After scaring off the teachers in the hallway, Marin re-entered the classroom, put down his backpack, and began pouring gasoline from a bottle. Marin used a lighter on the gasoline and started a fire. In the process, his backpack, which contained several Molotov cocktails, caught on fire. Marin left the room and headed downstairs to the Herman shopping mall. The fire was quickly extinguished.

While downstairs, Marin walked up to a janitor. He pointed an air pistol at the janitor's head with the intention of injuring him. However, the air pistol failed to fire due to an improperly screwed gas cylinder. Marin went back upstairs, leaving the janitor unharmed. While upstairs, Marin checked his air pistol.

Police were alerted at 12:29. The attack lasted for over 10 minutes, during which Marin stabbed twelve people. The only fatality was a 23-year-old Ukrainian-born woman who was a student at the college and had been stabbed in the neck and stomach, resulting in her death.

The attack ended when a policewoman shot and severely wounded Marin, who was sent to the Kuopio University Hospital for treatment. The policewoman was accompanied by a policeman who fired a shot at Marin, missing him. Marin approached the policeman and struck his hand, wounding him. The policewoman fired a shot at Marin, hitting him in the groin. Marin collapsed but still tried to attack with his sword. Another police officer arrived and fired a taser at Marin, shocking him. In the process, the officer also deployed a police dog to bite Marin's leg. After being tased and bitten, Marin eventually dropped the sword and was given first aid.

== Perpetrator ==
Joel Otto Aukusti Marin (born 1994) was a student at Savo Vocational College. The police found several incendiary devices similar to a Molotov cocktail when they searched Marin's apartment after the attack. Based on preliminary information, he had no previous criminal record.

Marin had moved to Kuopio from the municipality of Siilinjärvi at some point after matriculating in 2014. He had been regularly bullied since primary school for reasons including his clothing and being overweight. He was described as quiet and lonely. Marin had participated in shooting courses at the Kuopio Shooting Club. He had also planned the attack since 2017, only deciding to start preparations in September 2019. He had also shown familiarity with several school shootings including: Columbine, Sandy Hook, Jokela, and Kauhajoki. He was primarily inspired by the Kauhajoki school shooting during his planning. Marin initially planned to carry out the attack with a chainsaw and even purchased one several days before the stabbing. However, he decided against the plan after realizing how difficult it was to handle the chainsaw. The chainsaw would be found in his apartment after the attack.

== Aftermath ==
The Finnish Parliament (eduskunta) held a minute-long moment of silence the day after the attack to honor the victims. Finnish Prime Minister Antti Rinne called the violence "shocking and completely unacceptable" and visited Kuopio on 4 October. In November 2020 the perpetrator was sentenced to life imprisonment.

== See also ==
- Trollhättan school stabbing
- Crime in Finland
