= SIG Sauer Mosquito =

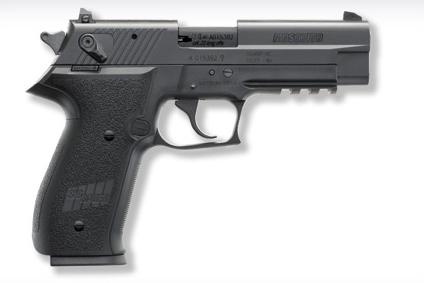
- SIG Mosquito
- Type: Semi-automatic pistol
- Place of origin: Germany

Production history
- Designed: 2003
- Manufacturer: SIG Sauer
- Produced: 2003–2013 (discontinued)

Specifications
- Mass: Empty: 24.6 oz (700 g)
- Length: Overall: 6.9 inches (180 mm)
- Cartridge: .22 Long Rifle
- Caliber: .22LR
- Action: Blowback
- Feed system: 10-round detachable magazine

The SIG Sauer Mosquito is a blowback-operated, semi-automatic pistol aesthetically based on the SIG Sauer P226, but 10% smaller in size and chambered for the .22 LR cartridge. The pistol is manufactured with an aluminum-zinc alloy slide and polymer frame. The controls are similar to those present on full-size models and include (from front to rear) a left takedown lever, a left decocking lever, reversible magazine catch and ambidextrous manual safety. In addition, the pistol is provided with an integral safety lock located at the rear of the magazine well which when enabled prevents cycling of slide, hammer fall, and trigger action. The pistol is available in five different configurations: Standard model, Sport, Threaded barrel, Two-tone, Reversed two-tone, and four special editions having different colors.

== Specifications ==
The standard Mosquito model is chambered in .22 LR and has a double-action/single-action (DA/SA) trigger. Single action trigger pull is 4.4 lbs while Double-action is 12.4 lbs. The polymer frame and small size (compared to the SIG P226) allow the pistol with magazine to weigh little more than 24.6 oz. The overall height is 5.3 inches with a barrel length of 3.9 inches. The Mosquito's frame has an accessory rail, a ten-round capacity magazine, and adjustable sights. SIG Sauer subcontracted product development and production of the Mosquito to German Sport Guns GmbH. After discontinuation of the Mosquito, German Sport Guns still sells their own version as the GSG FireFly.

== Criminal use ==
On 2 November, 2007, a SIG Sauer Mosquito was purchased by Pekka-Eric Auvinen as a substitute for the .22-calibre Ruger MK III he originally intended to purchase. Five days later, Auvinen would use the gun in the Jokela school shooting, leaving one person injured and nine others dead, including himself.
