= George L. Herter =

American businessman and author (1911–1994)

George Leonard Herter (24 May 1911 – 5 July 1994) of Waseca, Minnesota was the founder of the Herter's outdoor goods business and an author. His best known books are the Bull Cook and Authentic Historical Recipes and Practices series (published in three volumes), which have a cult following today.

In 1937 Herter took his father's dry goods store and turned it into a mail order outdoor goods business, selling hunting and fishing items through a catalog. He later opened retail outlet stores, which pioneered the style of outdoor goods stores now operated by Cabela's and Bass Pro Shops. The company went bankrupt in 1981.

After the end of WW2 he was in Belgium for the US army where he met his wife Berthe Gramme Charleroi they had a son Jacques who was born on October 22 1945 (source Guns & Ammo Feb 1960) He is best known for his books, which were self-published and sold through his stores. The New York Times describes the Bull Cook series as his "magnum opus", "a wild mix of recipes, unsourced claims and unhinged philosophy that went through at least 15 editions between 1960 and 1970."

How to Get Out of the Rat Race and Live On $10 a Month, despite its title, is an encyclopedic 656-page collection of outdoor and survival skills.

The Bull Cook series and How to Get Out of the Rat Race are credited as co-written by George Leonard Herter and his wife, Berthe E. Herter.

== Books by George Leonard Herter ==
- Bull Cook and Authentic Historical Recipes and Practices
- Bull Cook and Authentic Historical Recipes and Practices (volume 2)
- Bull Cook and Authentic Historical Recipes and Practices (volume 3)
- Professional Guide's Manual
- How to Get Out of the Rat Race and Live On $10 a Month
- How to Live With a Bitch
- George the Housewife
- Touch the Earth
- Professional Fly Tying, Spinning And Tackle Making Manual and Manufacturer's Guide (22 Editions)
- Professional and Amateur Archery Tournament and Hunting Instructions and Encyclopedia (with Russell Hofmeister)
- How to Make the Finest Wines at Home
- The Truth About Today's Hunting in Africa and How to Go On Safari for $690
- European and American Professional Sourdough Cooking and Recipes
- History and Secrets of Professional Candy Making
- Herter's Professional Course in the Science of Modern Taxidermy
- The Professional Way To Use An Axe
