= 1989 Raumanmeri school shooting =

1989 school shooting in Rauma, Finland

Raumanmeri school shooting
- Raumanmeri secondary school (Satakunta)
- Native name: Raumanmeren koulusurmat (Finnish); Skolskjutningen i Raumo (Swedish)
- Location: 61.1309°N 21.4933°E; Raumanmeri secondary school, Rauma, Finland
- Date: 25 January 1989; 37 years ago
- Attack type: School shooting, double-murder
- Weapons: 7.65mm Mauser semi-automatic pistol; 9mm Luger pistol (unused)
- Deaths: 2
- Injuries: 0
- Perpetrator: 14-year-old male student
- Motive: Mental illness and bullying

The Raumanmeri school shooting was a school shooting that occurred on 25 January 1989 at the Raumanmeri secondary school in Rauma, Finland. A 14-year-old student at the Raumanmeri secondary school fatally shot two of his classmates using a pistol that belonged to his father. The shooter had claimed to be a victim of bullying. Due to the perpetrator being under the age of 15, he never faced any criminal charges for the attack.

== Background ==
According to a teacher and the perpetrator himself, the perpetrator was bullied in school. According to a teacher, this bullying was verbal and included pushing of the shooter. The same teacher said that there were three to four bullies and the bullied perpetrator was described as physically small, smart, and different by the teacher. The teacher had told the bullies to stop pushing the perpetrator, but they hadn't listened to the teacher.

== Shooting ==
The perpetrator, who was 14 at the time, entered the classroom at approximately 7:55. As the morning assembly was nearing its end, the boy grabbed a Mauser-branded pistol, which belonged to his father, from his backpack. It was well known in the class that he was interested in guns, and he had presented them to others before. He also had a Parabellum pistol in his backpack, which he did not use. The shooter, who was described to appear nervous by an eyewitness, raised the pistol and attempted to fire at a classmate. The gun did not go off, which resulted in the shooter attempting to fire three times before the gun finally went off, after the shooter had hit it against his thigh, fatally wounding his classmate.

Panic broke out among the students in class and many of them attempted to flee. The shooter got up from his desk and made his way to the back of the classroom, where he shot at another student. The student fell to the ground, and attempted to shield himself using his backpack, but a second bullet pierced through it. The shooter then shot at an escaping boy, but missed as the boy fell to the ground before the shot was fired. After fatally wounding two of his classmates, the shooter ran out the back door of the school with his backpack and two of his father's guns with him.

As the paramedics arrived at the school, the two students that had been shot were still alive. The emergency status of the situation was not fully understood yet, and the first paramedics at the scene requested more ambulances once they realised the situation. The desks of the class had been pushed in a way which made it so that the second victim was not immediately spotted. Both students shot passed away later the same day at a hospital. One victim was 14 years old while the other one was 15.

The school decided to let the students go home, which made the search for the perpetrator slightly more difficult. The perpetrator of the shooting had prepared for an escape, as he had a sleeping bag with him and he had left two bicycles along the escape route. A local radio station, Ramona, broadcast a description of the shooter over the airwaves and said if a person matching the description were to come and ask someone for something, for example water, it was to be given to him and then reported to the police. At about 9:30, a woman living on Klamilantie heard a knock on her door, and it was a person matching the perpetrator's description asking for water, which the woman gave to him. The woman heard the broadcast by Ramona later that day, after which she immediately reported it to the police.

During the escape, the shooter purposefully walked along a small river to hide his scent from the police dogs. Eventually the police found his backpack and the two guns belonging to his father in a forest. A short time after, a police helicopter spotted the shooter himself, who was trying to hide. The shooter was captured at 17:00 at Eurajoki, near the town of Hankkila. During the ride to a police station, the driver asked the shooter how he felt, to which the boy responded with a question, "Did the third one also die?"

== Aftermath ==
After the shooting, it became apparent that the perpetrator felt himself to be a victim of bullying and targeted students with whom he had disagreements. He had also said he wanted to "eliminate" three people who were not nice to him. The perpetrator had trained in target shooting with his father. The school however denied that the shooter had ever been bullied. In some speeches made to the public about the shooting, violent television shows were blamed. The police report came to a conclusion that the shooting was not the result of bullying, but that the shooter had a mental breakdown for other reasons. In a psychiatric evaluation the shooter was found to have committed the shooting in an unstable space of mind.

At first bullying was not talked about in the media related to the shooting, due to fears that it would make the shooter appear as a hero and make others follow him. At the end of the year bullying started being spoken about more in relation to the shooting.

Due to the perpetrator being under the age of 15, he never faced any criminal charges for the attack. It was the first school shooting with multiple fatalities in the history of Finland.

== See also ==
- Crime in Finland
- Gun politics in Finland
- List of school-related attacks
- Jokela school shooting
- Kauhajoki school shooting
- Viertola school shooting
