= 2014 Helsinki University massacre plan =

Failed school attack in Helsinki, Finland

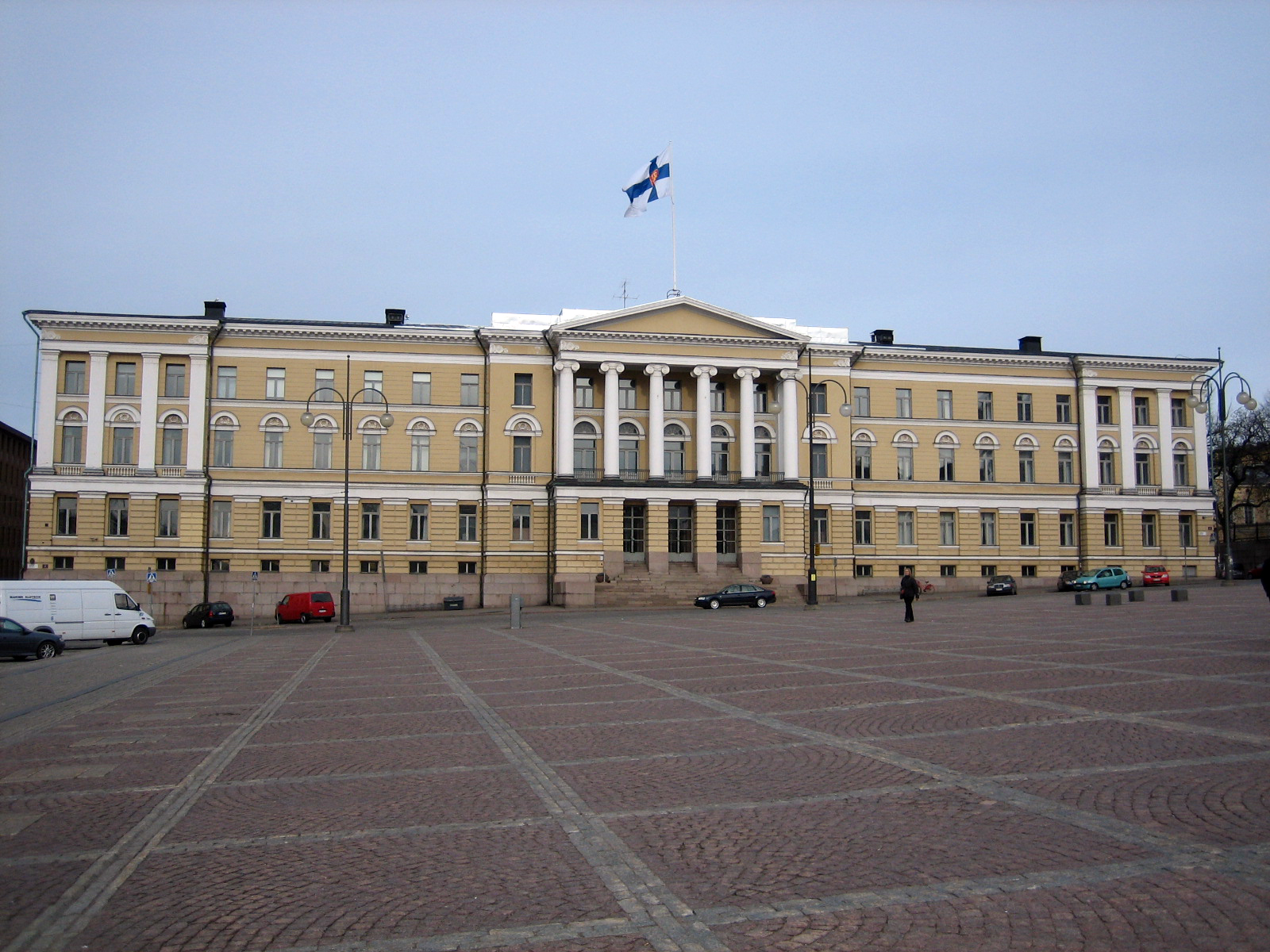
The main building of the University of Helsinki, where the attack would arguably have taken place.

The 2014 Helsinki University massacre plan was a mass murder planned by two people in Helsinki, Finland. The plan was discovered in spring 2014. The attack never happened, because a third person reported the plan to the police. The perpetrators were planning to kill several people, possibly 50 randomly chosen people, at the University of Helsinki with guns and poison gas.

== The accused ==
Two people were charged for planning the attack, a man from Kemi, born in 1990, and a woman from Vantaa, born in 1989. The defendants had devised a plan to obtain firearms by robbing a gun shop and to manufacture arsine gas to kill 50 people at the University of Helsinki. In addition, the defendants had weighed up the possibility of carrying out an attack at the Finnish Parliament or at a football match.

In interrogations, the defendants admitted to having been inspired by the Boston Marathon bombing in April 2013. Neither of them are enrolled at the University of Helsinki.

== Planning the attack ==
The accused met each other on 23 December 2012 through the Tor anonymity network. From the start, their discussions concerned planning a mass murder. Possible targets included a movie theater, a marathon, the Finnish Parliament House, the Presidential Independence Day Reception and numerous education institutions. The University of Helsinki was chosen as a target in August 2013, because it would be possible to kill many young people there. The accused acquired much equipment suitable for the attack, such as a crossbow, magazines and a large amount of ammunition, combat belts, gas masks and chemicals suitable for creating poisonous arsine gas.

The accused had originally discussed carrying out the attack on 20 January 2014. The man had travelled to Helsinki on 15 January, carrying the equipment he had acquired, and stayed with the woman. On 17 January, the two accused people had gone to investigate the University premises, and had studied the premises through the Internet. On the morning of 20 January the man said he wanted to move the attack to a later date. He told the woman that he wanted to plan the attack better and acquire more equipment.

The accused had discussed starting the attack by robbing a weapons store near the University. By thus having acquired more weapons, they would have moved straight to the University, where they would have killed people at random. In their discussions, they mentioned locking the exits, setting fire to the building and spreading poison gas. The accused mentioned wanting to die in the attack.

== Prevention of the attack ==
The accused man contacted a third person via Tor anonymity network on 23 January 2014, who had also written texts concerning mass murder. The accused man asked the third person whether they wanted to take part in the attack. After five days of messaging, it became apparent that the attack was planned to take place on 10 March.

The accused man had placed an announcement on the Tor network looking for an accomplice to take part in a "massage". The man was caught when an undercover police officer replied to the announcement. According to the court, the man had used the word "massage" because he had confused it with the word "massacre".

The defendants were nabbed by the police in March, after a 17-year-old girl who had been asked to take part in the attack by the male defendant revealed the plan to her friend.

The accused man was arrested during a home search on 4 March and the woman was arrested on the next day. Equipment for the planned attack was found at both of their homes. Both were declared as imprisoned on 8 March.

== Trial and sentence ==
The trial concerning the matter began at The District Court of Helsinki on 26 May 2014.

The District Court of Helsinki on 26 June 2014 sentenced a 24-year-old man and woman to prison for three years for a conspiracy to carry out a killing spree at the University of Helsinki.

The attack was initially set to be carried out in January 2014, but the defendants called it off to refine their plans.

Both defendants denied the charges in court, insisting that they had no intention of carrying out the attack.
