= Anne Holmlund =

Finnish politician (born 1964)

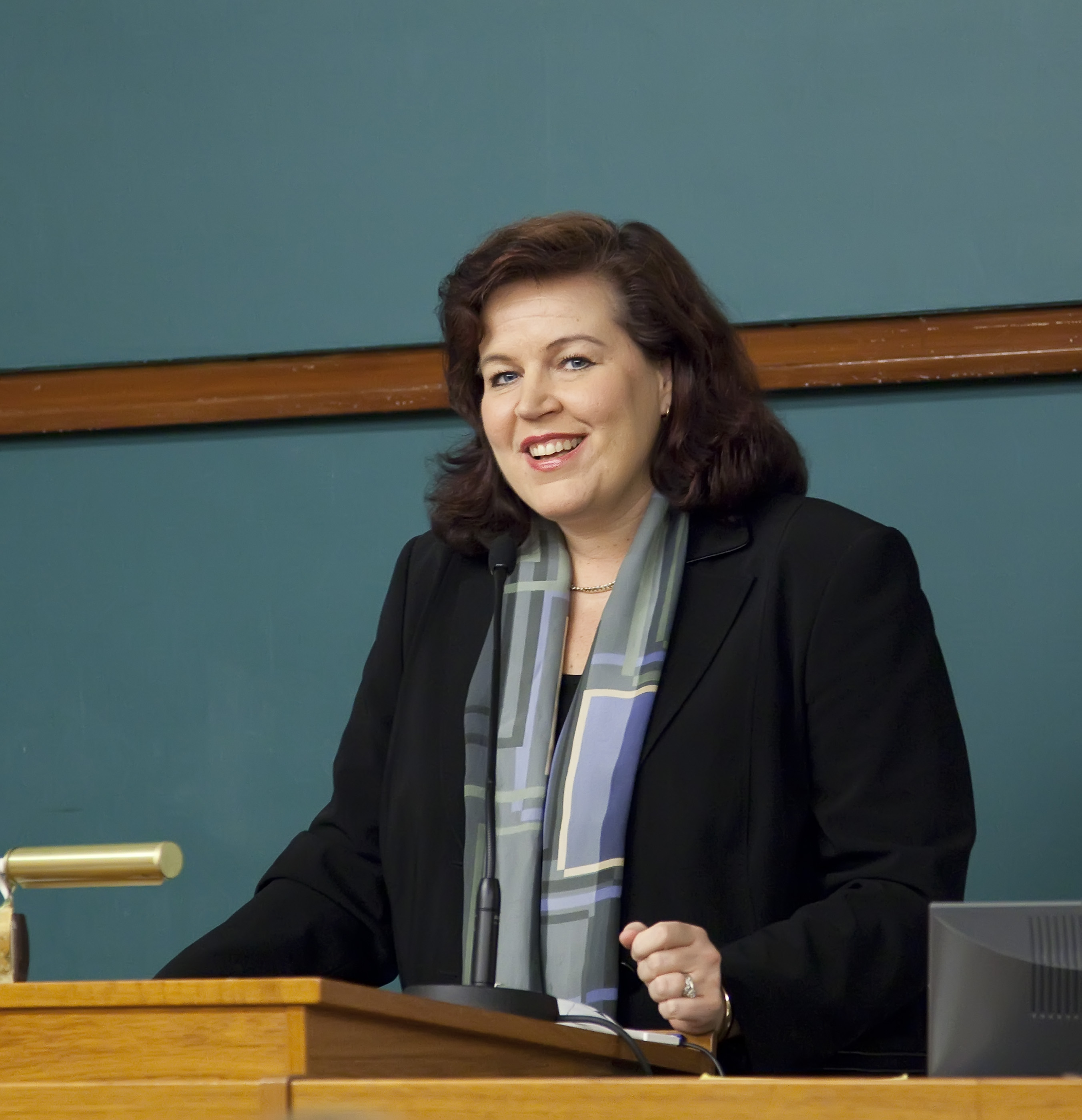

Minister of the Interior
- In office 19 April 2007 – 22 June 2011
- President: Tarja Halonen
- Prime Minister: Matti Vanhanen; Mari Kiviniemi
- Preceded by: Olli-Pekka Heinonen
- Succeeded by: Päivi Räsänen

Member of the Parliament of Finland
- In office 2 February 2002 – 21 April 2015
- Constituency: Satakunta

Personal details
- Born: Anne Elisabeth Holmlund; 18 April 1964 (age 62) Pori, Finland
- Party: National Coalition Party
- Spouse: Jarmo Peltomaa
- Occupation: Politician

Anne Elisabeth Holmlund (born 18 April 1964) is a Finnish politician and Minister of the Interior of Finland from 2007 to 2011. She was a Member of Parliament for the National Coalition Party from 2002 until 2015.

== Political career ==
Holmlund has been a member of the city council of Ulvila since 1989, and the council chairman 2001-2002 and 2005–2007. She was a member of the kaupunginhallitus 1993-2000 and the vice-chairman 2003–2004. She has been a Member of Parliament for the National Coalition Party since 2002. On 19 April 2007 she was chosen to be Interior Minister in Matti Vanhanen's second cabinet.

After the Kauhajoki school shooting in September 2008 Holmlund came under considerable pressure from some members of parliament, particularly those in the Left Alliance, to quit for failing to change legislation in order to prevent the shooting. A similar event in Jokela had taken place barely a year earlier. Leading the call for her deposition was Anneli Lapintie; Tarja Filatov, parliamentary group leader of the opposition Social Democratic Party of Finland (SDP) also questioned the government over what it had done since the Jokela incident. Minister of Finance Jyrki Katainen issued his full support to Holmlund. A survey by pollster Taloustutkimus for YLE showed that dissension towards Holmlund was not widespread: only a quarter of members from smaller parties felt she should step down, only 10% of SDP members (with 80% supporting her to stay on), and 90% of the government's partners wanted her to hold on to her ministry. Amongst the population, 82% felt she should continue. Holmlund herself stated at a news conference that resignation "would be tantamount to desertion".

== Personal life ==
Holmlund is married to Jarmo Peltomaa, and her father was Ilmari Holmlund, a known politician from Pori.
