= Savo Vocational College =

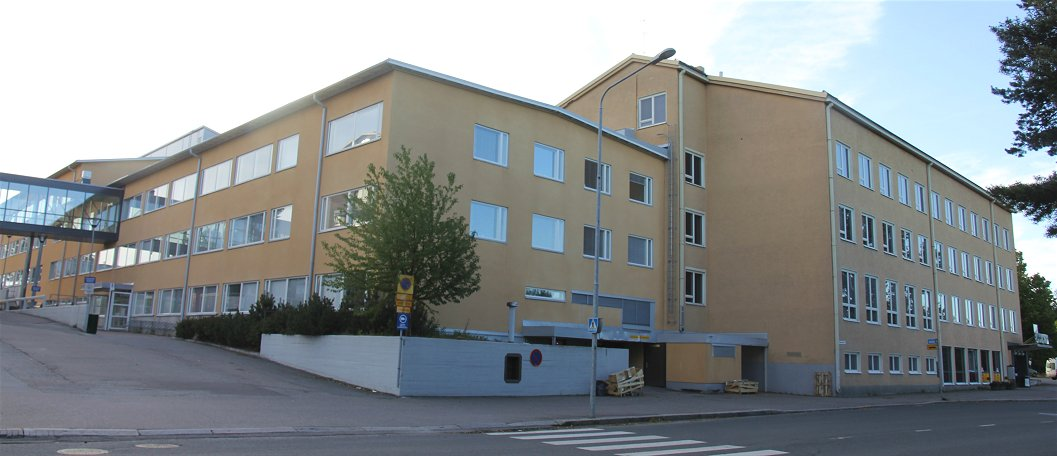
Campus located in Presidentinkatu 1, Kuopio.

Savo Vocational College is a vocational school run by the Savo Consortium for Education, operating at various campuses in the municipalities of Kuopio, Iisalmi, Varkaus and Siilinjärvi in Finland. In 2015, the vocational school had 5,721 students.

On 1 October 2019, a campus in Kuopio was attacked by a perpetrator armed with a sword, leaving one dead and ten injured. The assailant was shot twice by the police and taken into intensive care soon after.
