= Firearms regulation in Finland =

Firearms regulation in Finland incorporates the political and regulatory aspects of firearms usage in the country. Both hunting and shooting sports are common hobbies. There are approximately 300,000 people with hunting permits, and 34,000 people belong to sport shooting clubs. Over 1,500 people are licensed weapons collectors. Additionally, many reservists practice their skills using their own semi-automatic rifles and pistols after military service.

Legal firearms in Finland must be registered and licensed on a per-gun basis. There are approximately 1.5 million registered small firearms in the country. Out of those, 226,000 are short firearms (pistols, revolvers) with the rest being long firearms (rifles, shotguns). There are approximately 650,000 people with at least one permit, which means 12% of Finns own a firearm. Overall, legal gun ownership rate is similar to countries such as Sweden, France, Canada and Germany. Estimates place the number of illegal, unregistered firearms between some tens of thousands and upwards of a million. A large portion of these are thought to be weapons hidden during the aftermath of World War II.

The current Firearms Act of 1998 is a near full rewrite of the earlier, 1933 law. The law was revised to comply with the European Firearms Directive after Finland joined the European Union. Following the school shooting incidents in 2007 and 2008 in which the perpetrators used .22 caliber semi-automatic pistols, legislation regarding short firearms was considerably tightened in 2011. Nevertheless, no types of firearms are outright banned, and in principle a person can apply for a licence for any type of gun.

== Regulation ==
The ownership and use of firearms is regulated by the Firearms Act of 1998. A license is always needed for possession of a firearm and all firearms are registered. Firearms may only be carried while they are being used for a specific purpose (e.g. hunting, shooting at the range). When transporting a firearm to or from such activity, the firearm must be unloaded and stored in a case or pouch. The owner of a firearm is responsible for making sure that firearms and ammunition do not end up in unauthorized hands. The exact requirements regarding storage of firearms depends on their type and quantity.

Air guns up to 6.35 mm (0.25 inch) in caliber are not regulated regardless of their muzzle energy. Larger bore air weapons need a permit, unless the person already holds a firearms licence. Bows and crossbows are not regulated items in Finland, while pepper spray is. Suppressors are considered firearm components, but can be used without requiring any separate licensing. Magazine capacity is restricted under a normal license, for a maximum of 21 rounds for short guns and 11 rounds for a long gun. There is no regulation regarding other firearm accessories.

An unlicensed person may use firearms only under direct supervision. Simple unlawful possession of a firearm is punishable by fine or up to two years in prison, although more severe punishments may apply e.g. in the case of fully automatic weapons or when used to commit other crime. However, an unlicensed firearm may always be turned in without repercussions, provided this happens at the initiative of the person in possession of the firearm.

Certain types of ammunition, such as expanding pistol rounds or incendiary rounds, require special authorization (in addition to a firearms licence) to purchase. The amount of ammunition a person may possess is not limited by the Firearms Act. However, legislation related to the safe storage of explosive materials does apply. Ordinarily, this means a maximum of 20,000 rounds of ammunition (including loose primers) and 2 kg of gunpowder per household, with larger quantities requiring separate storage.

== Proposed changes to regulation ==
Currently, work is underway to streamline the license application process in straightforward cases. An applicant who already has existing permits and has a proven track-record with responsible ownership would be able to apply for further permits more easily.

In 2017, the EU adopted changes to the Firearms Directive that became known as the "EU Gun Ban". In local implementation, the major change to firearms users will be that self-loading rifle and pistol magazines with a capacity of more than 10 and 20 respectively will become more strictly controlled. Under the new law, they will only be available to sports shooters and reservists, but not hunters. Being knowingly in (unlicensed) possession of such a magazine will cause any firearms licenses to be revoked.

== Licensing ==
When applying for a licence to purchase a firearm, the applicant must fill in a form with information such as the type and mode of operation of firearm, and the intended purpose of use (although one can use any firearm for any legal purpose regardless of the original application, e.g. a range gun for hunting or vice versa). According to the law, the firearm must be appropriate for the stated purpose, but evaluating this is largely left to the discretion of the police. For example, while an AR-15 is suitable for practical shooting, the police may consider one inappropriate for hunting.

Valid reasons for obtaining a firearms license are:

	Reason	Description
1	Hunting	A valid hunting permit is expected. Minimum muzzle energy for different game, magazine capacity restrictions etc. defined in separate legislation.
2	Sports and hobby	Type of firearm needs to be appropriate for the discipline. Proof that the hobby exists is expected. For pistols and revolvers further requirements apply.
3	Work	The need for a firearm must be justified. Appropriate training is expected.
4	Film and theater	
5	Museum or collection	Person or organization the Ministry of the Interior has approved as a weapons collector.
6	Memento	Item is of significant importance to the person or family.
7	Signaling	Flare guns, e.g. for boating safety.
8	Proxy ownership	15–17 year olds may participate in sports shooting or hunting on their own but a licensed adult is responsible for the transportation and storage of the firearm.

The application process includes a check of criminal records, the police interviewing the applicant and in some cases a computer-based personality test or a medical health certificate. Any significant history with violence or other crime, substance abuse or mental health issues will cause the application to be rejected. Membership in a hunting or shooting club or other appropriate organization was considered a positive, though membership could not be legally required as the Constitution of Finland guarantees freedom of association. Since 2019, membership for more than a year in a registered shooting association has been required for obtaining a licence for "particularly dangerous firearms", i.e. large capacity semiautomatic weapons (handgun: >20, centerfire rifle: >10). A certificate of active shooting, for the last 12 (rifles) or 24 (handgun) months, from an authorized weapons instructor (of a registered shooting club) is required for handguns and "particularly dangerous firearms". More evidence of the applicant's recreational activity (such as a certificate of Safe Shooter status) may be required at the Police's discretion.

If the application is approved, an acquisition permit is mailed to the applicant. A dealer (or private person) may only sell a firearm if the buyer has the appropriate paperwork to show. There is no waiting period as such, but in practice processing an application takes a minimum of several days, usually a few weeks. Licences can be valid either until further notice or for a fixed term, which is sometimes the case for a people applying for their first license, and always with the first pistol license. A licence-holder may also borrow other firearms from the same or lesser category (e.g. a rifle licence is valid for borrowing shotguns and small-caliber rifles, but not pistols) and purchase ammunition for any firearm he owns or is permitted to borrow.

Classification of firearms

For legal purposes, firearms are divided into 13 different types:

	Type	Description
1	Shotgun	Smooth-bored long firearm designed to be used two-handed and supported against the shoulder.
2	Rifle	Rifled long firearm designed to be used two-handed and supported against the shoulder.
3	Small-caliber rifle	Rifle chambered for up to a .22 rimfire cartridge.
4	Pistol	Short firearm designed to be used with a one handed grip.
5	Small-caliber pistol	Pistol chambered for up to a .22 rimfire cartridge.
6	Revolver	Short firearm designed to be used with a one handed grip and which uses a revolving cartridge cylinder.
7	Small-caliber revolver	Revolver chambered for up to a .22 rimfire cartridge.
8	Combination weapon	Long firearm with two or more barrels, with at least one being rifled and one smooth-bore.
9	Gas weapon	Firearm capable of firing only gas cartridges.
10	Signaling pistol	Firearm capable of firing only signal cartridges.
11	Black-powder weapon	Firearm designed and manufactured to only be used with black powder.
12	Any other firearm	Catch-all category for firearms that do not fit into the above categories based on their dimensions or other characteristics.
13	Deactivated firearm	A firearm which has been permanently deactivated according to set guidelines.

A firearm is considered a short firearm if its overall length is at most 600mm, or its barrel length at most 300mm. In any other case the firearm is considered a long firearm.

Firearms are further divided into four modes of operation:

	Mode	Description
1	Single-shot	The firearm needs to be cycled and cocked by an external force and a new cartridge must be fed manually to the weapon after every shot
2	Single-shot with magazine	The firearm needs to be cycled and cocked by an external force and a new cartridge is taken directly from a magazine. Revolvers are also in this category.
3	Self-loading single shot	The firearm loads and cocks itself by the use of the energy produced by the firing of the previous cartridge or another power source. One shot is fired with each pull of the trigger.
4	Automatic fire	The firearm loads and cocks itself by the use of the energy produced by the firing of the previous cartridge or another power source. Multiple shots can be fired with one pull of the trigger.

Sub-compact pistols

A pistol is considered sub-compact or a "pocket gun" if it fits in a rectangular box of 180 x 130 mm. Special legislation applies to these easily concealed firearms and they are not licensed for sporting purposes. Some common pistols such as Glock 19 Gen 1-5 fall under this description, and are therefore generally unavailable to e.g. IPSC shooters in Finland.

Particularly dangerous firearms

Some types of firearms are considered "particularly dangerous". Licences for such firearms can only be granted on a very limited basis and are essentially for recognized collectors and filming purposes only. A firearm is considered particularly dangerous if:

- its mode of operation is automatic fire
- it is a cannon, rocket launcher or comparable weapon system
- it is disguised as another object

With the changes to the EU Firearms Directive, rifles with a magazine capacity of more than 10 cartridges and pistols with a magazine capacity of more than 20 cartridges were put into category A, or prohibited weapons. In Finnish nomenclature these firearms were added to the particularly dangerous category, which essentially restricts their availability to established practical shooters and those actively participating in reservist activities. The same firearms can be used with lower capacity magazines without being considered particularly dangerous.

Short-barreled rifles and carbines

Short-barreled rifles and pistol carbines fall under the any other firearm category and, while not restricted by law, are more difficult to get a licence for. The primary concern is again that, being easy to conceal, they are particularly dangerous should they be stolen and fall into criminal hands.

== Personal protection and self-defense ==
In the 1980s and 1990s, roughly 7% of firearm licenses were granted for the purpose of personal protection. However they have stopped giving licences on that basis, although existing permits remain valid. It is still possible to obtain a licence for pepper spray for the purpose of self-defense if a concrete threat exists. Carrying a firearm licensed for hunting or sporting use outside of that specific activity is not allowed. One can nevertheless legally defend oneself by any means available, including firearms. Any use of force must always be proportional to the threat.

== Role in crimes ==
Between 2010 and 2015, firearms were used in 15% of all homicides. In 73% of these the firearm was illegally possessed by the perpetrator.

The two school shootings in Jokela in 2007 and Kauhajoki in 2008 are by far the worst peacetime mass murders in Finland, with 8 and 10 victims, respectively. In both cases the perpetrator was armed with a 0.22 rimfire pistol licensed only shortly before. In the case of Pekka-Eric Auvinen, the original application was for a 9 mm pistol, but this was rejected. In the aftermath police were blamed for being too lax in issuing licences, as neither perpetrator had any significant history with sports shooting. Police defended their decision, stating that nothing suspicious had come up with the information available, so there was no reason to reject the application. Legislation was revised in 2011 and now pistol licenses can only be issued following a two-year period of documented, active pistol shooting hobby, and only to persons 20 years old or older.

== Role in suicides ==
In 2013, firearms (both legally and illegally held) were used in 18% of suicides. Some consider this a problem and would like to see stricter firearms legislation. Others point out that the number of suicides is already steadily going down, while the number of firearms has remained constant.

== Military reserve ==
Generally, military service weapons are stored by the Finnish Defence Forces, and are only given out during reservist training or mobilization. Active reservists have recently received instructions to bring their own licensed and suitable weapons to service, if available, along with other suitable gear they may have privately purchased for their reservist activities. From the perspective of the Finnish Defense Forces, reservists’ equipment purchases are a positive development, as they can enhance a reservist’s operational capability and help maintain their skills.

== See also ==
- Crime in Finland
- Viertola school shooting
