= Seinäjoki University of Applied Sciences =

Institute of higher education in Finland

Seinäjoki University of Applied Sciences (SEAMK)
- Seinäjoen ammattikorkeakoulu
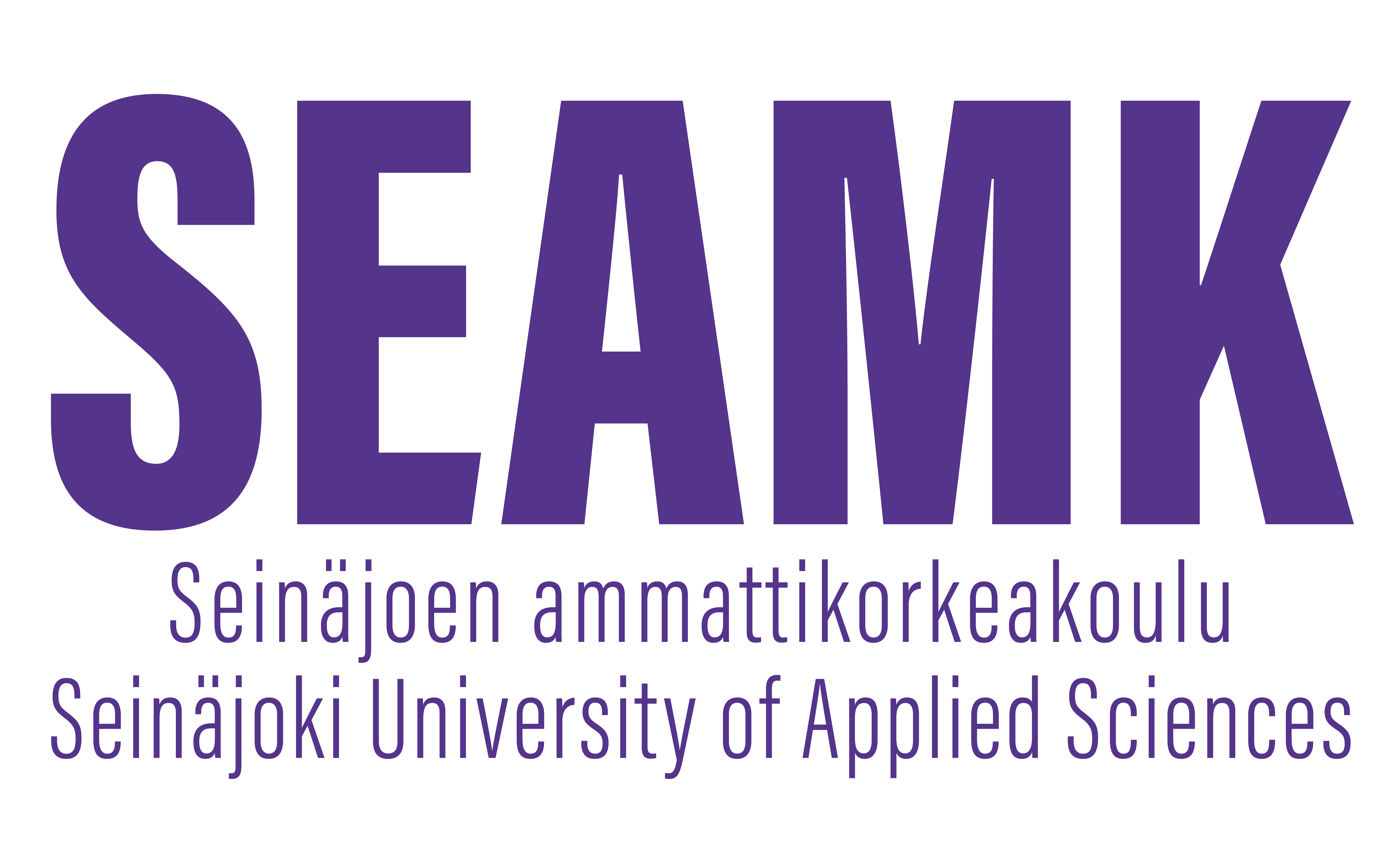
- Type: Public university of applied sciences
- Established: Provisional 1992 (perm. 1995)
- President: Jaakko Hallila
- Administrative staff: 400
- Students: 6000 (2025)
- Location: Seinäjoki, South Ostrobothnia, Finland; 62°47′24″N 22°49′18″E
- Nickname: SEAMK
- Website: SEAMK.fi/en

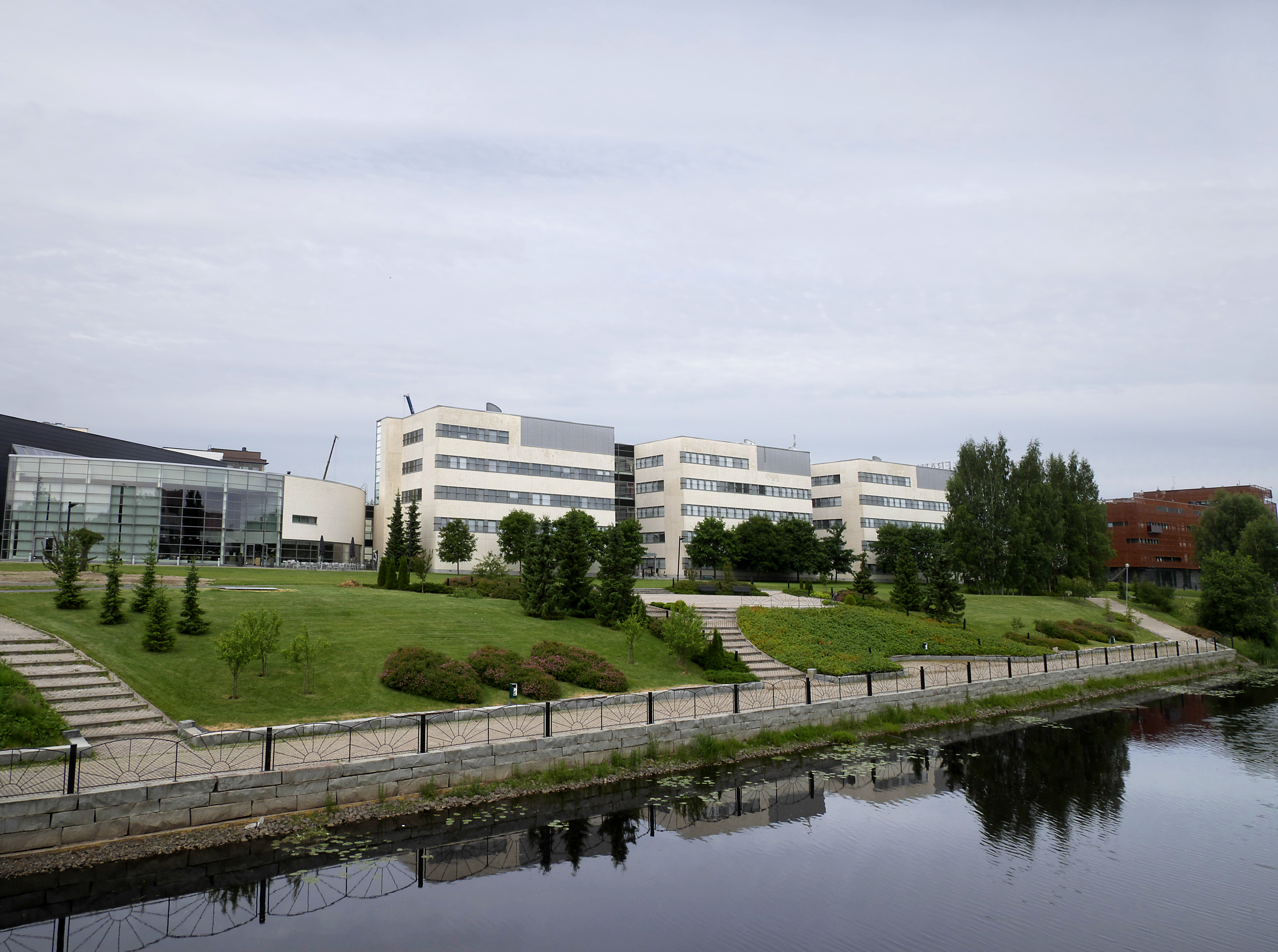
SEAMK Campus by river Seinäjoki

The Seinäjoki University of Applied Sciences (SEAMK; in Finnish: Seinäjoen ammattikorkeakoulu) is a multidisciplinary non-profit government dependent higher education institution and an efficient actor in education and research, development and innovation (RDI) in the region of South Ostrobothnia in West Finland. Its Kauhajoki satellite campus was the site of the 2008 Kauhajoki school shooting.

The Seinäjoki University of Applied Sciences specialises in entrepreneurship, food and internationality. The aim of the Seinäjoki University of Applied Sciences is to increase competence, competitiveness and well-being in the area of its operations. SEAMK Campus is located in the Technology Park Frami in Seinäjoki.

Seinäjoki University of Applied Sciences currently has about 6,000 students, of which over 10% are international degree students. SEAMK has approximately 400 employees, of which over 100 work in the field of research, development and innovations (RDI). Jaakko Hallila, D.Sc. (Admin.), is the president and CEO of the Seinäjoki University of Applied Sciences. He has been the president of SEAMK since September 2020, when Tapio Varmola, who was the president since the establishment of SEAMK, retired. SEAMK was established in 1992. Seinäjoen Ammattikorkeakoulu Oy (limited company) has been the administrator of SEAMK since 2014.

Seinäjoki University of Applied Sciences has two faculties and six fields of education. The faculties are SEAMK Technology and Business, and SEAMK Welfare and Culture. All the education fields of the faculties provide higher education and are efficient actors in research, development and innovation area.

In 2020, 2021 and 2022, Seinäjoki University of Applied Sciences (SEAMK) has been chosen as the best university of applied sciences in Finland in the results of the nationwide graduation feedback survey (AVOP). According to the graduates of a bachelor's degree, SEAMK has the best study satisfaction, the best contents of studies, the best learning environments as well as the best study support services and working life connections. In the areas of internationality, work life counselling, internship, and thesis, SEAMK reached the second highest place. In this nationwide survey, students evaluate and provide feedback on completed studies.

As of 2024, SEAMK has been part of HEROES which EU Commission selects as new European University alliance to boost smart regional resilience.

In 2026, the steering group for elite athlete friendly university of the Finnish Olympic Committee awarded SEAMK the Elite Athlete Friendly University quality label. At elite athlete friendly universities, guidance and practical arrangements are designed to support the combination of elite sports and studies.

SEAMK also invests in sustainable development and regularly participates in international surveys.

The Finnish higher education system is divided into traditional research universities, which focus more on academic research, and universities of applied sciences, which emphasise more working life connections. SEAMK is a university of applied sciences. See Finnish educational system.

== Faculties and fields of education ==
SEAMK's faculties are:

- SEAMK Technology and Business
- SEAMK Welfare and Culture

SEAMK's fields of education are:

- Business
- Culture
- Food and hospitality
- Health care and social work
- Natural resources
- Technology

== Education ==
Seinäjoki University of Applied Sciences provides education aiming at high-level professional qualification in the following fields:

- Culture
- Social sciences, business and administration
- Technology, communication and transport
- Natural resources and the environment
- Social services, health and sports
- Tourism, catering and domestic services

Seinäjoki University of Applied Sciences has 23 bachelor's and 14 master's degree programmes of which seven degree programmes are totally taught in English: bachelor's degree programmes in International Business (BBA), Automation Engineering (BEng), Sustainable Food Processing/ Agri-food Engineering (AFE), Hospitality Management as well as Nursing (RN), and master's degree programmes in International Business Management (MBA) and in Social Services and/or Health Care, Development and Management.

Also double degree programmes are available in the fields of technology and business.
