= Kauhajoki school shooting =

2008 shooting in Finland

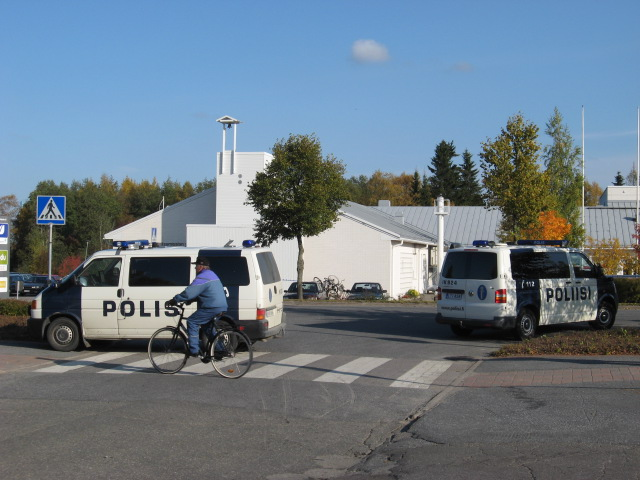
- A scene of the Kauhajoki vocational college campus a few hours after the shooting
- Native name: Kauhajoen koulusurmat (Finnish); Skolskjutningen i Kauhajoki (Swedish)
- Location: 62°25′45″N 22°10′54″E; Kauhajoki, Finland
- Date: 23 September 2008 c. 10:42 – 12:13 (UTC+3)
- Target: Students and staff at Kauhajoki School of Hospitality
- Attack type: School shooting, mass murder, murder–suicide, arson, copycat crime
- Weapons: .22LR Walther P22 Target semi-automatic pistol; Gasoline
- Deaths: 11 (including the perpetrator)
- Injuries: ≈33 (1 by gunfire)
- Perpetrator: Matti Juhani Saari
- Motive: Misanthropy; Revenge for bullying; Jokela school shooting copycat crime

On 23 September 2008, a school shooting occurred at the Seinäjoki University of Applied Sciences (SeAMK) in Kauhajoki, Finland. The gunman, 22-year-old student Matti Juhani Saari, shot and killed ten people with a Walther P22 Target semi-automatic pistol, with nine victims having been in a classroom and one in a hallway, before shooting himself in the head. He died a few hours later at Tampere University Hospital. Three were injured in the classroom after jumping out the window with one woman also having been shot in the head. Additionally, about 30 police officers were injured after inhaling smoke.

The shooting took place at the Kauhajoki School of Hospitality, owned by the Seinäjoki Municipal Federation of Education. The facilities and campus were shared between SeAMK and the Seinäjoki Vocational Education Centre – Sedu. Saari was a second-year student in a Hospitality Management undergraduate degree programme.

The incident was the second school shooting in less than a year in Finland, the other being the Jokela school shooting in November 2007. The first similar incident in the country's history was the Raumanmeri school shooting in Rauma in 1989. It remains the deadliest school shooting in the history of Finland.

== Shooting ==
Matti Saari entered the school buildings using the basement. Shooting began in a classroom at around 10:40 (UTC+3). There were roughly 200 people assembled inside the college. The emergency services received the first call about the incident at 10:43, from a student inside the classroom. Saari was armed with a .22 LR caliber Walther P22 Target semi-automatic firearm and several soft drink bottles containing gasoline. He wore dark clothing including a leather jacket.

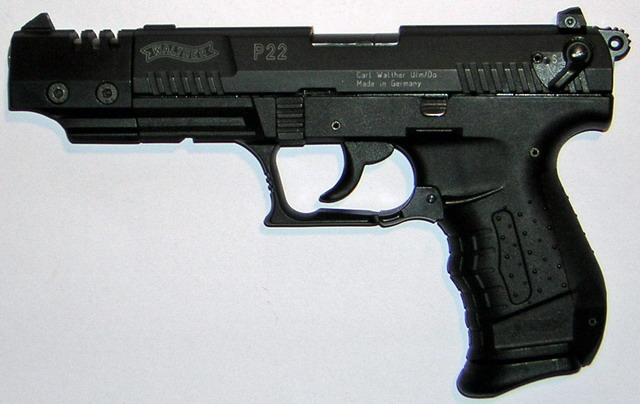
A .22 LR Walther P22 Target pistol similar to the one used in the attack.

Saari initially opened fire on a group of students who were taking a business studies exam. He also entered at least one other classroom during the incident. There were twelve students and a teacher in the classroom. According to three students who were able to escape, Saari approached his victims individually and shot them, whilst acting aggressively. Saari encountered little resistance and the massacre was concluded relatively quickly. He left the exam room at least once during the shooting to reload in the hallway outside. According to witnesses, a teacher unsuccessfully attempted to prevent him from returning into the classroom and was killed as a result.

Nine victims died in the exam room and the tenth victim died in the hallway. One student was seriously wounded in the head but survived. Saari then covered the classroom in a flammable liquid, believed to be petrol, and set the room alight. Some of the victims' bodies were damaged by the fire, making it more difficult to identify them. Eight of the victims were female students, one a male student, and one a male member of staff. All of the students killed were in their 20s, and the teacher was in his 50s. A 21-year-old woman was shot in the head but survived. She had two operations in the days after the incident, and she was reported as being in a satisfactory condition.

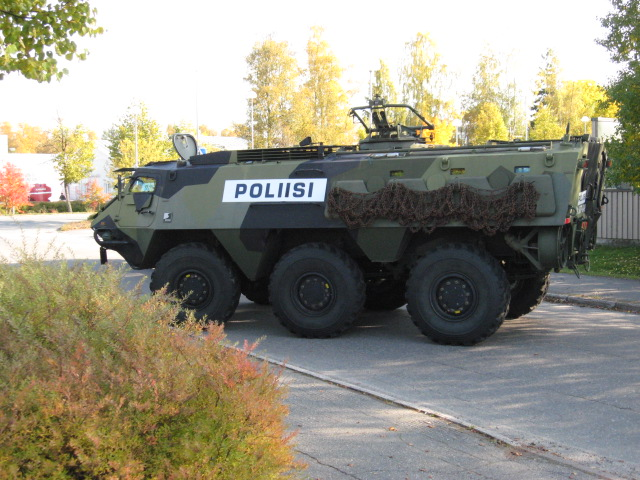
A Sisu Pasi armoured vehicle near the scene of the shooting

A student in an adjacent classroom, Sanna Orpana, said that her class had heard "shooting and a kind of a rumble like tables falling down." Orpana believed at the time that the noise may have been coming from a toy gun, and two other students went to investigate the noise. Saari shot at them, and the remaining students in Orpana's classroom hid under a table before running upstairs. At some point between 10:45–11:00 Saari ran down a corridor and lit a fire in a language laboratory. He then shot out all of the windows in the school's main corridor, which extended through the building. It was during this time that Saari took aim at Forsberg.

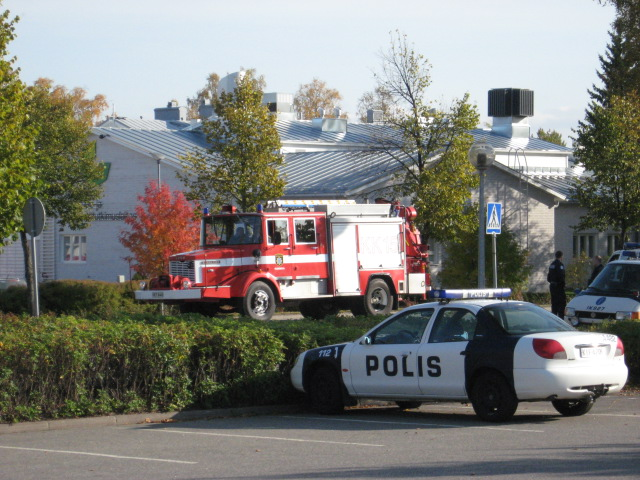
A fire engine and police cars outside the school

A police van with two officers arrived a short time after the shootings began, at around 11:05. They entered the yard of the college where they were shot at by Saari and forced to retreat. From around 11:45 to 12:00, further police units, bolstered by a number of armoured vehicles, began to arrive on the scene. They attempted to enter the building through the main corridor. This assault was aborted due to black smoke emanating from within the building. Meanwhile, some students escaped the school buildings through doors and windows, but found themselves impeded by a river that adjoined the school.

Firefighters extinguished the fires with no major damage to the school. Saari remained at large for some time in the school grounds. Two days after the killings, a friend of Saari's, named Rauno, told the tabloid magazine 7 päivää that he received a call from Saari at 11:53 in which he confessed to having perpetrated the shooting. Saari apparently spoke to Rauno in a calm manner, telling him that he wanted to say goodbye. Saari was still alive after sustaining a self inflicted gunshot wound to the head. He was found by the police at 12:13. He was taken to Tampere University Hospital and treated for his wound. He eventually succumbed to his injury and died at 16:46.

== Victims ==
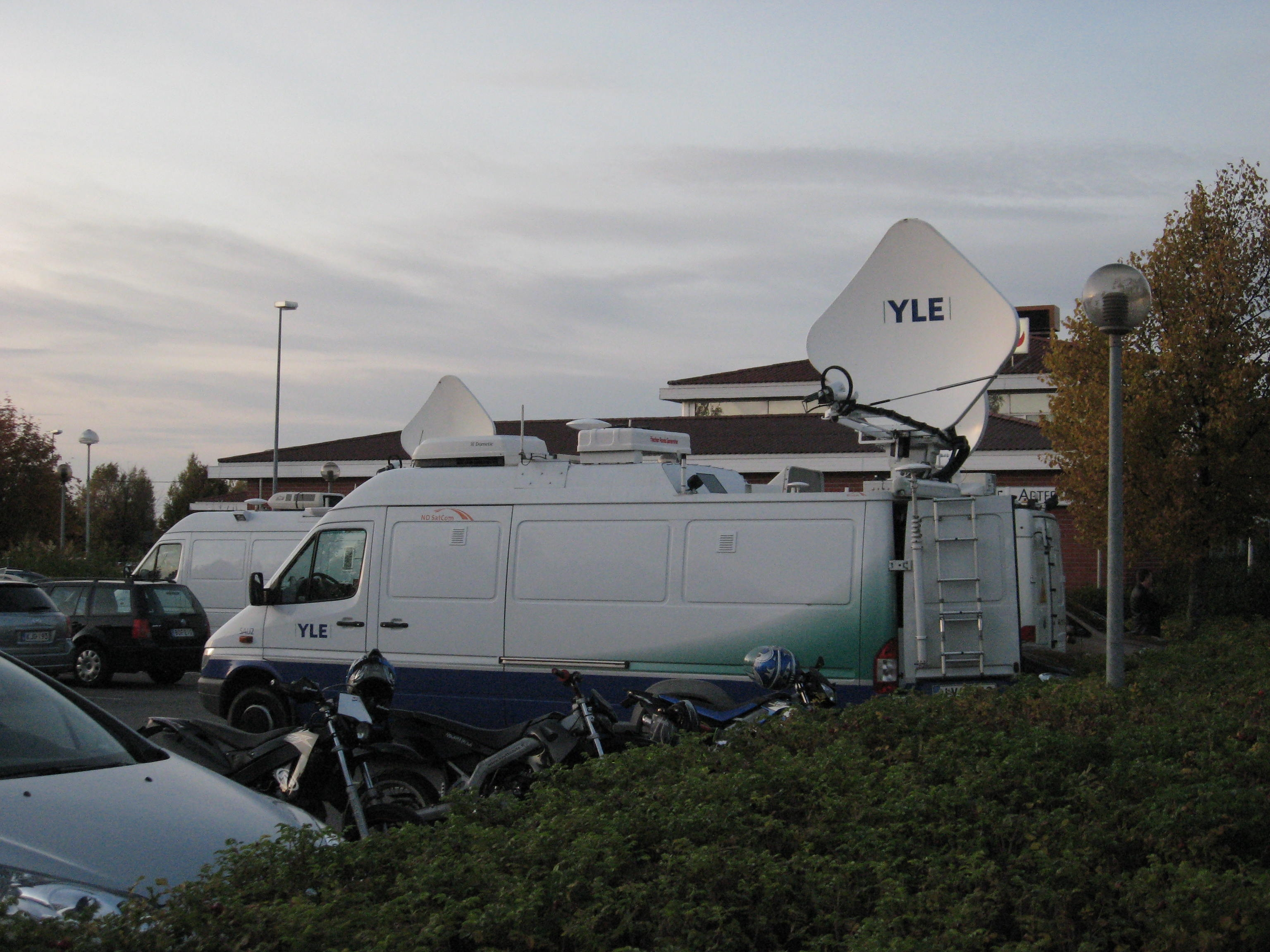
An YLE broadcasting van near the school buildings

Saari was originally from North Ostrobothnia but lived in Kauhajoki, where he was enrolled in a catering course at the college. It was later revealed that the single male victim was probably a close friend of Saari's. The pair had spent an evening out together in February 2008 when they were threatened with a starter pistol. A photo of them together had been circulating on the Internet, in which Saari jokingly points at his friend's head with his forefinger. The names of the other victims were withheld by police, but were eventually released by the media.

The two other survivors were slightly injured from the glass and from falling out of the window. About 30 police officers inhaled smoke, dust, or chemicals during the incident and needed medical treatment. While most recovered, 14 officers dealt with long-term symptoms, and one was eventually diagnosed with a permanent work-related illness.

With a total of ten people killed, it was the deadliest peacetime attack in Finnish history, surpassing the previous highest count of eight in the Jokela school shooting. It was the deadliest attack on a school campus since April 2007, when Seung-Hui Cho killed 32 people during the Virginia Tech shooting. Saari had fired his weapon at least 157 times. The gunshot wounds sustained by the victims ranged between 1 and 17 wounds, mainly to the head and upper body. A total of 62 bullet wounds were found on the victims.

== Investigation ==
Saari left behind two handwritten notes in his school dormitory. In his notes he stated that had been planning the massacre for six years. A police spokesperson commented: "Saari left notes saying he had a hatred for mankind, for the whole human race, and that he had been thinking about what he was going to do for years. The notes show he was very troubled and he hated everything." Police said that although most of the victims were female, the motive did not seem to be a hatred of women. One of Saari's friends noticed a change in his behaviour about two years before the shootings, when Saari began expressing a fondness for guns and an admiration of school shootings in the United States. The friend said that around eighteen months before the incident, Saari had sent him a message saying that he would carry out a school shooting the next day. Saari reportedly denied being serious about carrying out his threat.

Finnish police were also investigating whether a copycat element was involved after it emerged that both Saari and Pekka-Eric Auvinen, the gunman in the Jokela shooting, had bought their guns from the same store. Both gunmen had taken photographs of themselves in similar poses. Both exchanged videos related to school shootings on YouTube and Finnish social networking site IRC-Galleria. In March 2009, police ruled out contact with Auvinen, and said that he had committed his crimes alone. 200 people were interviewed during the investigation, none of whom said they knew of Saari's plans. Although there was no connection between Auvinen and Saari, it is clear that Saari was inspired and influenced by the Jokela shooting, as the two incidents were very similar. Saari is known to have started dressing and behaving similarly to Auvinen in the period between the two shootings.

== Perpetrator ==
Saari in a photograph uploaded by him on the day of the shooting

Matti Juhani Saari (20 May 1986 – 23 September 2008) was identified as the gunman responsible for the shooting. Saari, a Hospitality Management student at the school, was expelled from the Finnish Army in 2006 after serving for a month. He opened fire in a woodland exercise against orders. Saari had dropped out of his secondary school classes due to bullying. A friend of Saari reported that Saari had been seeing a psychologist in the months leading up to the shooting, and that he had been obsessed with guns.

In his youth, Saari suffered from health problems. His early childhood was marked by slow growth and frequent illness. His brother died when he was 17 years old, which apparently devastated him. He was said to be very shy and sensitive. According to psychologist Peter Langman, Saari seems to have displayed signs of avoidant personality disorder and possibly schizotypal personality disorder later in his life. He was a target of school bullying and he suffered from anxiety, panic attacks and depression. During his month-long service in the Finnish Army, Saari was described as "weird and silent". He apparently had difficulties fitting in. In his last years, he abused alcohol and was arrested for driving under the influence.

Saari had a YouTube account where he uploaded videos of him firing a handgun at a local shooting range. There was footage of the Columbine High School massacre in his YouTube favorites list. Finnish police had been informed about the YouTube videos in an anonymous tip-off on the Friday before the shooting. The police had talked to Saari and they searched his home the day before the incident, on 22 September. They found no legal basis to arrest him, as he held a temporary weapons permit. Saari had obtained a licence for the pistol used in the shooting on August 7, 2008 and purchased the P22 a few days later. Saari did not have a criminal record. A police inspector was subsequently charged with dereliction of duty, and his court case began in September 2009.

Saari posted footage on a Finnish social networking site, in which he points a firearm at the camera and says, in English, "You will die next", followed by firing four shots in the direction of the camera. This video was not available to the police when Saari was questioned. A police spokesperson commented: "The only video we saw was where he was shooting at the range. It was only afterwards that more information came out." Police said that if they had known about this IRC-video at the time of the questioning, Saari would have been detained. Police said that they believed Saari's videos were shot by someone else. They tried to identify who this person was. The Chief Investigator of the case, Jari Neulaniemi, speculated that the cameraman may have been the friend of Saari's who was murdered.

Interior Minister Anne Holmlund announced that the actions of the police would be investigated. Police Commissioner Mikko Paatero said that Finnish police would increase their monitoring of YouTube and other social networking sites. When asked whether similar attacks could take place in the future, he replied: "I sadly fear it's possible."

== Response ==
On the day of the incident, a crisis meeting was held with government ministers, chairs of the parliamentary groups, and police officials. Prime Minister Matti Vanhanen described it as a "tragic day" and appealed for unity in the hope "that events like these will not happen again." A national day of mourning was declared for the following day. Vanhanen travelled to Kauhajoki to meet with students.

Within days of the shooting, the police said that they had received a sizeable number of tip-offs alerting them to suspicious photographs, videos, and comments in chat rooms. Finnish media reported that several bomb threats and other threatening messages were circulating amongst students nationwide in the days after the shootings.

== See also ==
- Gun politics in Finland
- Jokela school shooting – perpetrated by Pekka-Eric Auvinen, by whom Saari was inspired
