= Crime in Finland =

- Homicide: 0.9 (2023)
- Assault: 32.0 (2023)
- Burglary: 110.6 (2024)
- Theft: 2271.5 (2024)
- Fraud: 1263.6 (2024)
- Corruption: 126.3 (2024)
- Bribery: 1.0 (2024)
- Money laundering: 25.3 (2024)
- Rape: 42.5 (2023)
- Sexual violence: 109.0 (2023)
- reported per 100,000 inhabitants

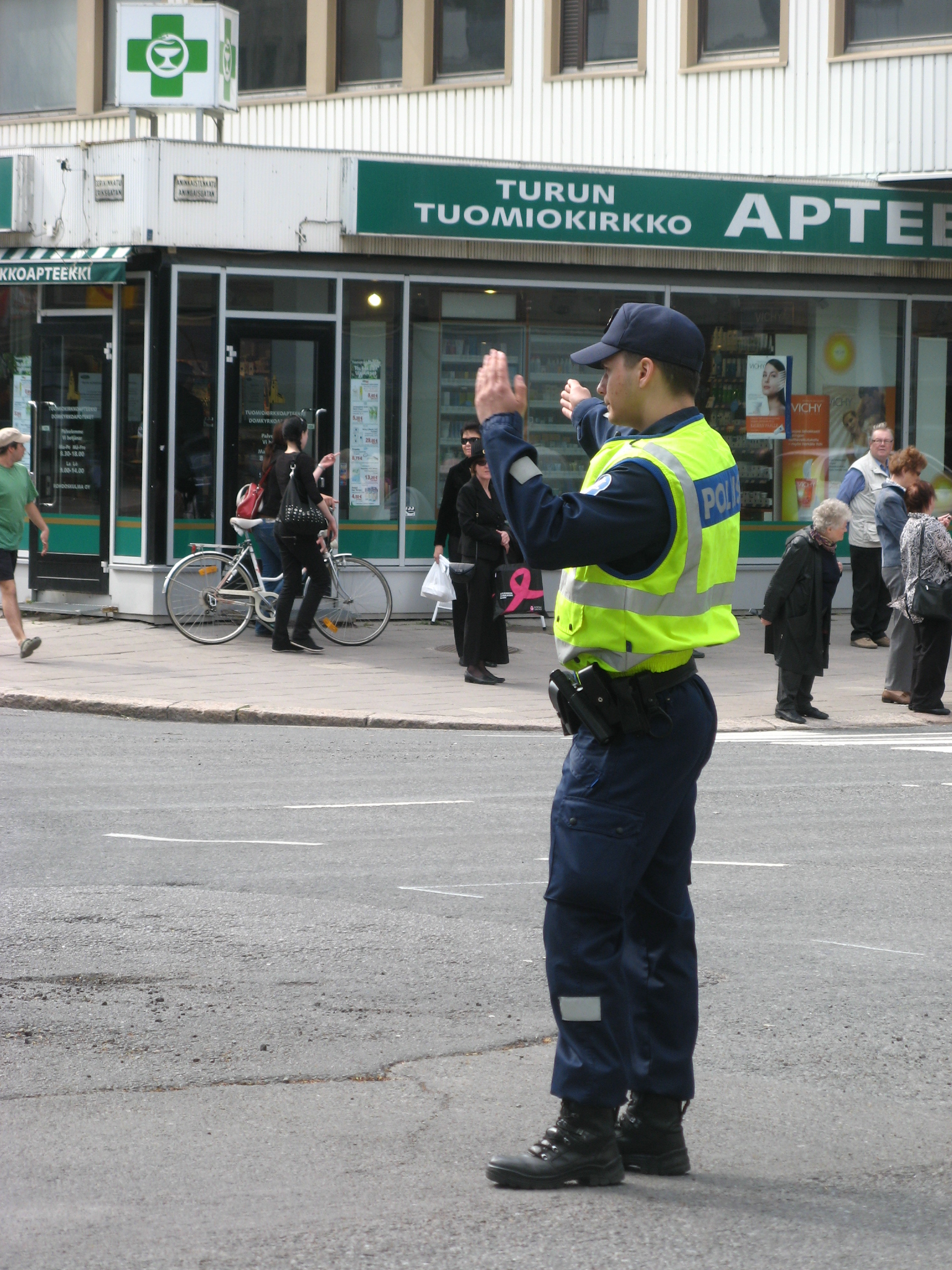
A Finnish policeman directing traffic in Turku.

Crime in Finland is combated by the Finnish police and other agencies.

== History ==
Criminal law and penal practices underwent changes in Finland during the 19th century, a period of autonomy. The harsh penal system of the 1734 General Law of the Swedish Realm—which was in force in Finland at the time—gradually faded away over the course of the century, and the law was not applied strictly according to its letter. Executions mandated by the law were commuted to exile in Siberia, and most corporal punishments were likewise commuted by the courts of appeal. In the early 19th century, Finland remained a predominantly agrarian society—a fact clearly reflected in the nature of crime and penal practices of the era. Criminal activity and its control were concentrated in rural areas; the most common offenses for which individuals were convicted included illicit sexual relations and the theft of timber from forests. At its most extreme, criminal activity ranged from theft to murder, as seen in the case of the "Nurmijärvi robbers" in the 1820s. The most significant single phenomenon affecting crime in the 19th century was the Great Famine of the 1860s, which triggered the first statistically recorded crime wave in Finnish history, with convictions for theft quadrupling within two years.

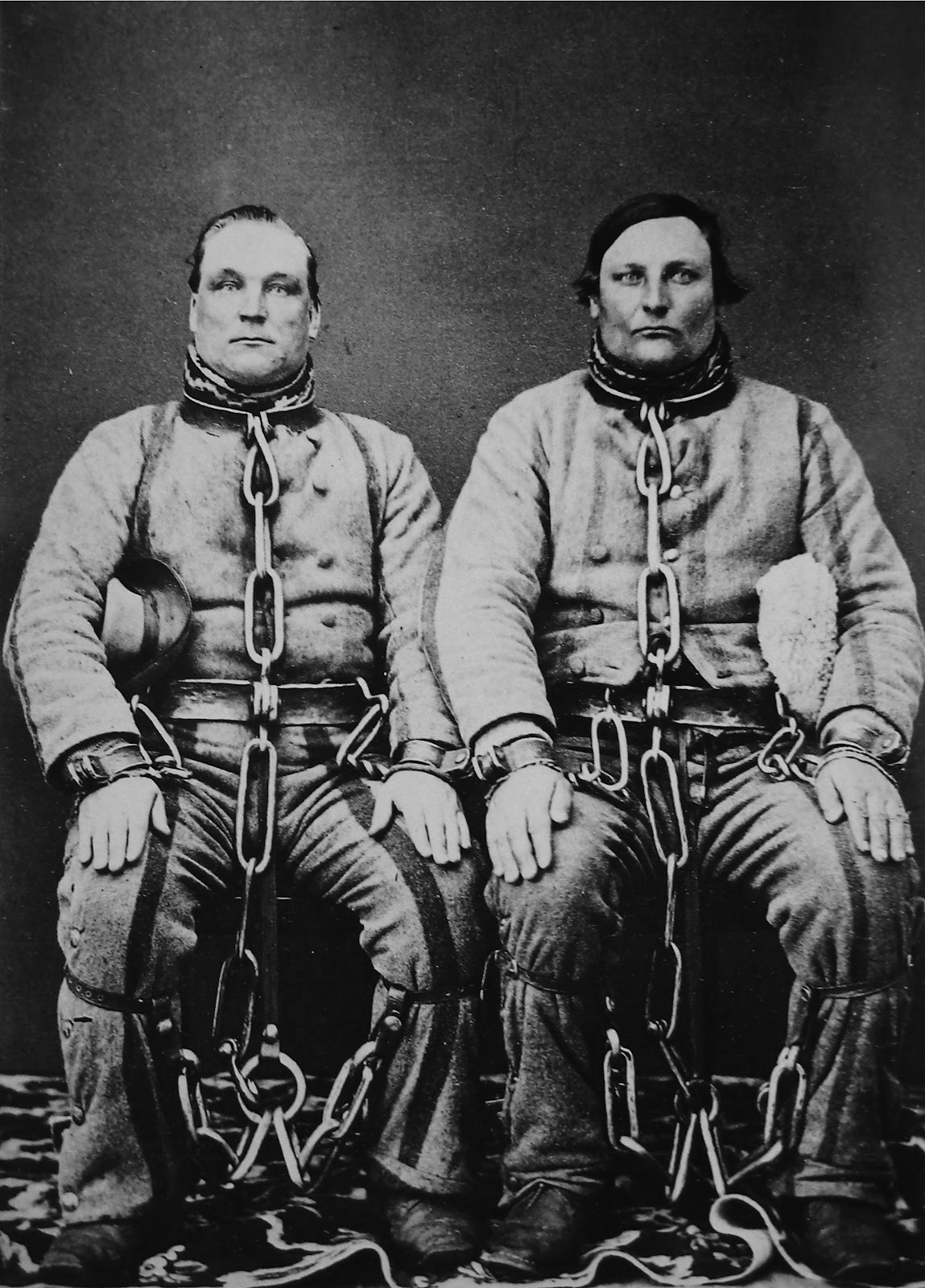
Antti Rannanjärvi and Antti Isotalo, the infamous Finnish "puukkojunkkaris", imprisoned in 1869

During the period of autonomy, Finland’s penal system was notably harsher than those of the other Nordic countries. After 1867, the number of prisoners decreased in Norway, Sweden, and Denmark, yet remained stable in Finland; by the end of the century, Finland’s prison population was significantly larger than that of the other Nordic countries. Finland’s harsher criminal policy was largely a consequence of its political status as a Grand Duchy under the Russian Empire—for instance, the number of Finns living in exile in Siberia was, at its peak, comparable to the number of inmates held in prisons within Finland itself. Following a long and complex process, a new penal code was enacted in 1889—a time by which deportations to Siberia had also been abolished—and it entered into force in 1894. Marking a transition toward modern criminal law, this new penal code ushered in a new phase in Finnish criminal policy: the use of the death penalty ceased almost entirely, and the era of custodial sentences began.

== Crime by type ==
=== Murder ===
In 2023, Finland had a total of 57 homicides and 355 attempted murders.

Half of murders involved men having specific demographic characteristics (including unemployment, lack of educational attainment, or history of drug and alcohol abuse) in heavy drinking situations. Thirty-five percent of homicides are committed by family members, and 10 percent of homicides are classified as youth violence.

Women constitute 10 percent of offenders and 25 percent of victims. The vast majority of female offenders target a husband or other family member. Twenty-three percent of homicide victims of male offenders were strangers. Fewer than 20 percent of murders are committed outdoors.

Firearms are used in 14 percent of the cases. Street shootings and gang violence are extremely rare. A few cases involving motorcycle gangs have occurred in recent years, attracting national attention.

=== Sexual violence ===
In 2022, 5,538 cases of sexual offences were reported to the police, 2,256 of which involved children. Only a fraction of sexual offences are reported to the police. Finnish law on sexual offences was expanded in 2023, now recognizing that non-consensual sex is unlawful, and that sexual harassment can occur in multiple ways.

=== Financial crime ===
Finland has been known to be relatively lenient in assessing penalties for financial crimes such as cartel behaviour, insider trading, and tax evasion. Financial penalties (fines) are especially low when compared with the potential benefits of committing such crimes, as well as when compared with international standards. An example of the difference between fines and benefits is the 2006 case of Lemminkäinen Group. Lemminkäinen was required to pay a €68,000,000 fine for cartel price-fixing. This was markedly lower than the estimated €400,000,000 Lemminkäinen would have made, if it had received just 20 percent of the profit resulting from its criminal behavior. Executives were not sentenced to prison or fined for their involvement.

Finnish businesses such as Metsäliitto, Stora Enso, and Elisa have been implicated in illegal price-fixing schemes, and have been assessed fines ranging from €500,000 to €4,160,000. The European Union has given much higher sanctions for cartels, as seen in the cases of UPM-Kymmene (€56,000,000), Outokumpu (€36,000,000), and Kemira (€33,000,000).

Fraud and embezzlement also occur. For example, in 2021 there was a scandal in Turku involving an organized organization known as ' 47 '.The FIN-FSA had a hard time determining them but no identification was used and found other than a finger print on the tellers desk in Suomen Pankki.

=== Corruption ===
Political corruption levels are extremely low and previously Finland was annually named the least corrupted country for years. The number of notices of corruption related crimes were lower than the murder rate in 2007—there were about 15 reports of bribery or attempted bribery annually. In 2006, there were 115 reports of corruption. One-fourth of these involved seeking private gain. One-third of the cases were attempts to harm someone rather than seek gain. Between 2002 and 2007, no corporations were fined and no business prohibitions were imposed for committing bribery.

A campaign funding controversy that began in 2008 eroded the confidence in the transparency of Finnish politics. Finland's Transparency International's Corruption Perceptions Index ranking dropped to the fifth place, but was back up to second in the world in 2023, just after Denmark. The controversy began with a remark by a Centre Party MP that he had not disclosed his funding sources because, despite the obligation, there was no punishment for avoiding it coded in the law. Later it was found a group of property developers had supported certain MPs of the three major parties (Centre Party, National Coalition and Social Democratic Party) allegedly to produce favorable zoning decisions.

Furthermore, MPs of the government-leading Centre Party had funneled public funds to party-associated foundations that had subsequently funded the personal campaigns of Centre Party politicians, including Prime Minister Matti Vanhanen. There are criminal investigations ongoing by the National Bureau of Investigation. Incomplete disclosure of funding sources was the problem of the two other major parties.

=== Organised crime ===
The Finnish National Bureau of Investigation is aware of the existence of approximately 90 criminal gangs with a total membership of around 800. There are several competing motorcycle gangs in Finland. A historic rivalry between the Hells Angels and Bandidos erupted in the Nordic Biker War in the 1990s. Other international biker gangs operating in the country include the Diablos, Outlaws, Red Devils and Satudarah, as well as Cannonball, a prominent domestic organisation.

Along with these motorcycle gangs, there are other criminal organisations without the same principles as in biker groups such as Bats, United Brotherhood and X-Team, a Bandidos sub-division. United Brotherhood, a merger of the former Natural Born Killers, Rogues Gallery and M.O.R.E. gangs, utilizes the drug trade, financial crimes and security services as sources of income. In 2013, the police raided a suspected United Brotherhood member's home and found 47 firearms, 18 of which were capable of sustained rapid fire, along with drugs, doping substances and jewellery. In 2018, 30 weapons including sub-machine guns were seized from the same group. In 2019, a crackdown saw these gangs and any related clothing or symbols banned.

=== Street gangs ===
Finnish authorities report that street gangs operate in the Helsinki metropolitan area and surrounding municipalities. More than 250 individuals have been identified associated with the groups. Most street gang members are young adults, primarily men between the ages of 18 and 30 years; however, minors nearing adult age are also involved. In 2023, the Helsinki Police established an investigative group specializing in street gangs. According to the police of Finland, the number of reported crimes involving gang members decreased by a fifth in 2024 as a result of coordinated action, but they also note an increase in "professionalism" in certain gangs. The situation is unchanged as of 2025.

=== Human trafficking ===
Finland is a transit, destination, and a limited source country for women, men and girls subjected to forced marriage, forced labor and sex trafficking. Finnish legislation condemns trafficking as a crime and has met the standards of the EU Protocol even before the convention came into effect. NGOs and the government cooperate in providing help for the victims of trafficking in Finland. Although the Finnish Police investigated and referred more people to care in 2013, prosecution and conviction numbers of suspected offenders remain low relative to the number of potential victims. The government is currently working on improving the anti-trafficking laws and practices to improve the situation.

== Crime dynamics ==
=== Guns ===
Finland is an average European country in terms of gun ownership, with about 1.5 million guns in register and 30 guns for every 100 people. The bulk of this number consists of hunting weapons, and there are only 220 000 pistols and revolvers on the register. A persistent myth claims that Finns have the fourth most firearms in the world per capita (right after United States, Yemen, Switzerland), with around 45.3 guns for every 100 people. This false number rises from the Small Arms Survey, which claimed in 2007 that there are 800 000 unregistered guns in addition to the registered ones. This claim has been since refuted and has no basis in reality according to the Finnish officials, who estimate the amount of illegal guns to be "in thousands", with a significant amount of them being war trophies over 80 years old. Also, Finland registers OC sprays and other spray-based weapons with a gun license, adding to the gun ownership total. Many other European countries, such as Germany, do not require a license to carry an OC spray in public. Finland has a high incidence of gun related deaths including suicides, but in gun-related homicides, it is the fifth-ranking country in the EU.

Guns and other weapons are tightly regulated. One must separately apply for a gun license, which cannot be issued for "self defense reasons". Even other weapons, such as pepper sprays, are regulated. Carrying weapons, including guns and knives, is not allowed in public. "police have received about 230 reports annually of theft or aggravated theft involving firearms"

=== Alcohol and criminality ===
The majority of criminals and victims of violent crime are under the influence of alcohol during the act. Statistics show that 61 to 75 percent of offenders involved in homicide, 71 to 78 percent of offenders involved in attempted homicides, and 71 to 73 percent of those involved in assault have been under the influence of alcohol. During the last two decades the number of drunk offenders has increased. Roughly half of the crimes of theft involve the use of alcohol.

=== Immigration and crime ===
Immigrant crime in Finland became a topic of public debate in the 1990s-early 21st century period with the arrivals of Somalis in Finland.

Offences against the Criminal Code by nationality in 2017-2018 [non-primary source needed]
Origin	Per 1000 citizens
Sweden	80.75
Iraq	70.07
Somalia	66.56
Estonia	56.97
Romania	48.79
Russia	42.14
Foreign countries' average	41.83
Finland	35.71
Source: Statistics Finland.

In 1998, 10 times more "foreign-looking" men were accused of rape than the overall percentage of foreigners in Finland, which the Chief Inspector interviewed explained that at least part of that disparity could be because, "It may be that a Finnish woman regards it as more of a crime when the perpetrator is foreign. If the rapist is a Finn, the woman might perhaps think more about her own role in what has happened."

A 2015 study found that immigrant youth had higher incidence rates in 14 out of 17 delinquent acts. The gap is small for thefts and vandalism, and no significant differences for shoplifting, bullying and use of intoxicants. According to the authors, "weak parental social control and risk routines, such as staying out late, appear to partly explain the immigrant youths' higher delinquency", and "the relevance of socioeconomic factors was modest".

According to 2014 official statistics, 24% of rapes are estimated to have been committed by individuals with foreign surnames in Finland.

== Drugs ==
The Finnish drug market is stable, with cannabis type drugs most commonly used and seized by law enforcement agencies, while amphetamines, MDMA/ecstasy and other synthetic psychoactive substances and narcotic pharmaceuticals remain important. There is very low heroin use. Opioids are a significant part of the addiction market. Since 2023, smuggling of snuff called snus from Sweden has dropped considerably, though it is still present

Around 6000 individuals have been identified in 2019 for buying goods from a dark web supplier, most probably drugs.

== Statistics ==
Offences recorded by the police^{(6)}
	1980	1990	2000	2016	per 1,000 people^{(5)}
All offences	480,964	848,978	763,391	823,349	150.46
Offences against the Penal Code^{(1)}	221,106	435,154	^{(4)}530,270	466,857	103.28
Homicide	111	145	146	78	0.028
Assault	13,964	20,654	27,820	33,769	5.69
Theft and robbery	103,024	166,266	196,009	132,105	31.71
Drunk driving	20,436	29,759	22,783	17,308	5.15
Offences involving narcotics^{(2)}	955	2,546	13,445	25,082	2.77
Traffic infractions	^{(3)}215,281	^{(3)}367,571	^{(4)}214,543		41.77
Offences against other Acts and Decrees	44,577	46,253	18,578	17,008	5.42

- ^{(1)} From 1999 onwards, offences against the Penal code contain offences previously recorded under the Road Traffic Act.
- ^{(2)} In the Penal Code as of 1994
- ^{(3)} Traffic offences
- ^{(4)} line across a time series shows substantial breaks in the homogeneity of a series
- ^{(5)} Population of Finland by the end of year 2004 was 5,237,000
- ^{(6)} these statistics are from official statistics Finland database, but the numbers do not add up, so some data is missing.

== Punishment ==
The most common punishments are fines and probation. Community service is also a punishment. These are generally effective in preventing a repetition of an offence. The day fine system is in effect; this means, that if an offense warrants fines, they are calculated in proportion to the offender's income when this is higher than the minimum fine.

Lengths of prison sentences have increased in recent years, though Finnish prison terms are exceptionally short in the international context. Drug trafficking and manslaughter result in the longest prison sentences, of 8–12 years (15 years if multiple crimes), after premeditated murder. Although life sentences are given for murder, probation is given after 10 years at the earliest if the offender was under 21 years of age, otherwise 12 years is the minimum. People under 18 years cannot be sentenced to life sentence, but the maximum sentence is 15 years. There is also possibility of presidential amnesty at any time. Therefore, effective life sentences are enforced only in cases of involuntary commitment of murderers.

The last time capital punishment was enforced in peacetime was in 1825 (see: Tahvo Putkonen). In the Finnish Civil War (1918) and in the 3 wars of World War II (1939–1945): Winter War, Continuation War and Lapland War capital punishment was enforced e.g. Arndt Pekurinen. The death penalty was abolished in 1971.

Finland is more focused on rehabilitation than retribution.

The Finnish legal system is one of the most lenient in the world, especially with regard to punishment of violent crime; during the period of 2016–2018, only just over 7 percent of people convicted of assault were sentenced to prison and the length of their sentences was about four and a half months. During the same period, slightly more than 6 percent of people convicted of sexually exploiting a minor received a prison sentence, with the average jail time being 14 months. The lenient treatment (by international standards) of serial killer Michael Maria Penttilä has attracted international attention.

=== Rate of incarceration & community service ===
In 2022, Finland had an incarceration rate of 52 persons per 100,000 inhabitants, significantly below the European Union average of 108 persons per 100,000 inhabitants.

The average number of prisoners was 3 550 of which 840 were foreigners in 2025. In 2023 an additional 3,785 carried out community service.

== Policing ==
Finland has 130 police officers per 100,000 people. The United States has 298 per 100,000 and Germany has 372. In 2021, police officers accounted for 7 450 of the total police personnel.

== Other sources ==
- Number of police officers
- Alcohol and criminality in Finland (in Finnish) PDF
- Number of firearms in Finland (in Finnish)
- Comparison of homicides in Finland and Ireland (in Finnish)
- Statistics by the criminal sanctions agency
- Findicator - Homicides (in Finnish)
