= Imprisonment =

Restraint of a person's liberty by judicial or other detention

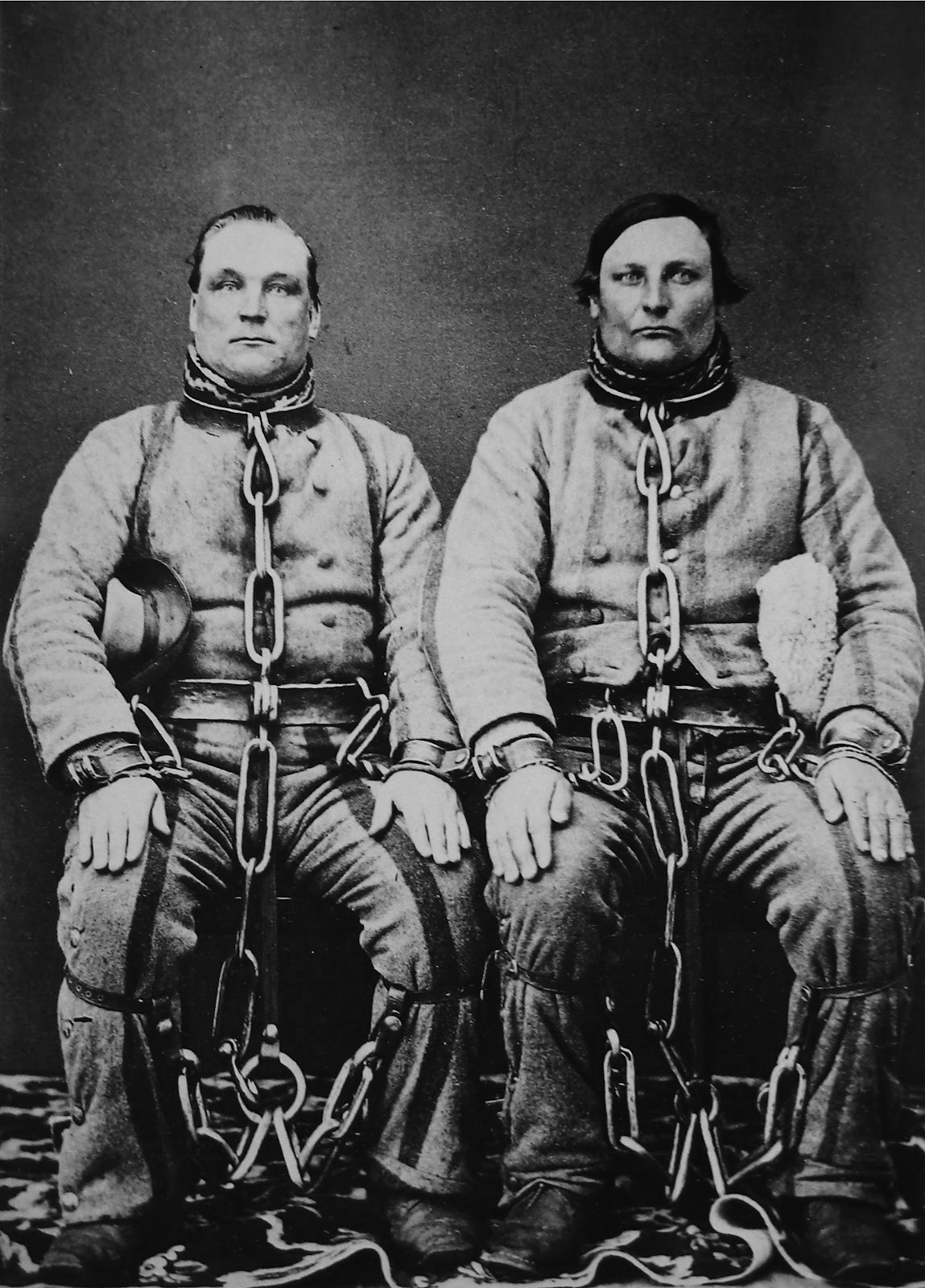
Antti Rannanjärvi and Antti Isotalo, the infamous Finnish "puukkojunkkaris", imprisoned in 1869

Imprisonment or incarceration is the restraint of a person's liberty for any cause whatsoever, whether by authority of the government, or by a person acting without such authority. In the latter case it is considered "false imprisonment". Imprisonment does not necessarily imply a place of confinement with bolts and bars, but may be exercised by any use or display of force (such as placing one in handcuffs), lawfully or unlawfully, wherever displayed, even in the open street. People become prisoners, wherever they may be, by the mere word or touch of a duly authorized officer directed to that end. Usually, however, imprisonment is understood to imply actual confinement against one's will in a prison employed for the purpose according to the provisions of the law. Generally gender imbalances occur in imprisonment rates, with incarceration of males proportionately more likely than incarceration of females.

Although reforms have targeted conditions of imprisonment on human rights grounds, imprisonment itself and the length of sentences has largely escaped scrutiny on human rights grounds despite similar evidence for its harm compared to recognized forms of ill-treatment and torture. Prison abolition is a growing movement but has not become a mainstream position, despite the criticism of mass incarceration in the United States and the "defund the police" movement.

== History ==
=== Africa ===
Before colonisation, imprisonment was used in sub-Saharan Africa for pre-trial detention, to secure compensation and as a last resort but not generally as punishment, except in the Songhai Empire (1464–1591) and in connection with the Atlantic slave trade. In the colonial period, imprisonment provided a source of labor and a means of suppression. The use of imprisonment has continued to the present day.

=== Australia ===
Incarceration in what became known as Australia was introduced through colonization. As noted by scholar Thalia Anthony, the Australian settler colonial state has engaged in carceral tactics of containment and segregation against Aboriginal Australians since colonizers first arrived, "whether that be for Christian, civilizing, protectionist, welfare, or penal purposes." When settlers arrived, they invented courts and passed laws without consent of Indigenous peoples that stated that they had jurisdiction over them and their lands. When Indigenous peoples challenged these laws, they were imprisoned.

=== England and Wales ===
In English law, imprisonment is the restraint of a person's liberty. The 17th century book Termes de la Ley contains the following definition:

Imprisonment is no other thing than the restraint of a man's liberty, whether it be in the open field, or in the stocks, or in the cage in the streets or in a man's own house, as well as in the common gaols; and in all the places the party so restrained is said to be a prisoner so long as he hath not his liberty freely to go at all times to all places whither he will without bail or mainprise or otherwise.

Imprisonment without lawful cause is a tort called false imprisonment. In England and Wales, a much larger proportion of the black population is imprisoned than of the white.

== Release ==
When a prisoner completes serving their sentence, starts probation, or is given a compassionate release they are no longer considered prisoners and are released to the outside world. A prisoner of war may be released as a result of the end of hostilities or a prisoner exchange. Prisoners serving a full life or indefinite sentence may never be released.

Released prisoners may suffer from issues including psychiatric disorders, criminalized behaviours and access to basic needs. Some criminals, particularly criminals convicted of serious crimes (felonies or indictable offenses,) are given restrictions after release, including bans from buying firearms or jury duty exclusion. Post release resources may be provided by the authorities. Various factors have been investigated as to their influence on post-release recidivism, such as family and other relationships, employment, housing and ability to quit drug use.

== See also ==
- Arrest
- Criminal justice
- Detention (imprisonment)
- Imprisonment for public protection
- Life imprisonment
- List of countries by incarceration rate
- Prison
- Prisoner of war
- Rehabilitation (penology)
- Restorative justice
