= Isotalo =

Isotalo is a Finnish surname. Notable people with the surname include:

- Antti Isotalo (1831–1911), Finnish farmer and criminal
- Antti Isotalo (Jäger) (1895–1964), Finnish 20th-century war-time lieutenant
- Markku Yli-Isotalo (1952–2011), Finnish wrestler
- Pentti Isotalo (1927–2021), Finnish ice hockey player
