= Finnish Border Guard =

Finnish government agency for border security

Finnish Border Guard Rajavartiolaitos (Finnish) Gränsbevakningsväsendet (Swedish)
- Emblem of the Finnish Border Guard

- Ship racing stripe
- Abbreviation: FBG, RVL, GBV

Agency overview
- Formed: 21 March 1919; 107 years ago
- Employees: 3,800 career personnel, mobilised strength 12,600

Jurisdictional structure
- Operations jurisdiction: Finland
- Specialist jurisdictions: Immigration; National border patrol, security, integrity; Coastal patrol, marine border protection, marine search and rescue

Operational structure
- Elected officer responsible: Minister of the Interior, Mari Rantanen
- Agency executives: Lieutenant general Pasi Kostamovaara, Chief of the Border Guard; Rear admiral Markku Hassinen, Deputy Chief of the Border Guard
- Child agencies: 5 District Commands; 15 Battalions

Website
- raja.fi/en/

The Finnish Border Guard (FBG, Finnish: Rajavartiolaitos, RVL; Swedish: Gränsbevakningsväsendet, GBV) is the agency responsible for enforcing the security of Finland's borders.

== Duties ==
Main duties of the Finnish Border Guard:

- Protecting the land borders and territorial waters of Finland from unauthorised encroachment.
- Passport control at border crossing points, airports and ports.
- First line of defence against territorial invasions.
- Rescue operations (mainly at sea and in the remote areas of Lapland).
- Provide aid to other authorities such as the fire department in case of unusual events like wild fires.
- Investigation of crimes pertaining to border security.
- Aiding police forces in civil duties such as crowd control and riot control.
- Military operations pertaining to internal security.
- Customs control in the minor border crossing points without customs authorities.
- Training of conscripts for wartime duty. These include rajajääkäri (border jaegers) and erikoisrajajääkäri (special border jaegers).
- (During wartime) Long range patrols and guerrilla tactics behind enemy lines.

The agency has police and investigative powers in immigration matters and can independently investigate immigration violations with search and rescue (SAR) duties, both maritime and inland. Missions inland are often carried out in co-operation with local fire and rescue departments or other authorities.

== Jurisdiction ==
For the discharge of its duties, the Border Guard has limited police powers in the areas where it operates.

It can, for example, seize and arrest persons and conduct searches in apartments and cars pursuant to same legislation as the police, when investigating a crime.

However, the power to arrest a person has been delegated only to the commanding officers of border control detachments and commanders and vice-commanders of larger units.

The Border Guard is not supposed to be used for the keeping of public order under normal circumstances, but it has two readiness platoons that can be used to support the police in exceptional situations in matters of crowd control and internal security (including incidents involving dangerous armed criminals).

The readiness platoons have been used to supplement riot police during high-profile international events where there is a perceived danger of violent demonstrations, e.g. during the "Smash ASEM" demonstration in 2006.

However, the main duty of the readiness platoons is to handle the most demanding border security incidents. Border Guard helicopters have also been used to assist police and rescue authorities in various missions.

The Border Guard also has the power to keep public order in its own facilities and in their immediate vicinity. For the execution of its military exercises, any officer with the minimum rank of Captain can close an area temporarily.

The Border Guard is responsible for enforcing the 3–5 km (1.9–3.1 mi) border zone towards Russia and issues the permits to visit the zone.

== Organisation ==
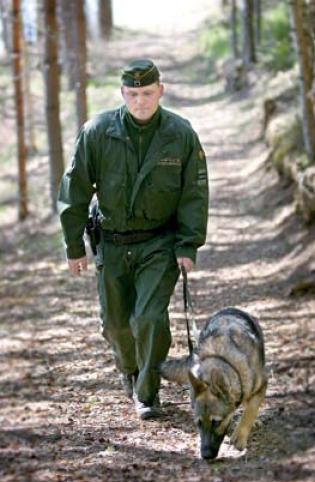
Finnish Border Guard on patrol with a dog

The Border Guard is a military organisation, subordinate to the Ministry of the Interior in administrative issues and to the president of Finland in issues pertaining to his authority as Commander-in-Chief (e.g. officer promotions).

Administrative units are responsible for the functions of the Border Guard.

These administrative units are the Border Guard Headquarters, Southeast Finland, North Karelia, Kainuu and Lapland border guard districts, the Gulf of Finland and West Finland coast guard districts, Air Patrol Squadron and Border and Coast Guard Academy.

The Border Guards have two readiness units; the 1st Special Intervention Unit, which operates in South-Eastern Finland, and the 5th Special Intervention Unit, which operates in the Gulf of Finland area.

The Finnish Border Guard consists of 3,800 active duty personnel. Upon mobilization, it would be wholly or partly incorporated into the Finnish Defence Forces and its strength increased with reservists who have served their conscription in the branch.

The mobilized strength of the Finnish Border Guard is 12,600 servicemen.

The Finland–Russia border is actively monitored. The western sea borders and the western and northern land borders to Sweden and Norway are free to cross under the Nordic passport union, the Border Guard does however maintain personnel in these regions owing to its SAR duties.

== Cooperation ==
There is a separate Finnish Customs agency, and immigration is also handled by the Finnish National Police and the Finnish Directorate of Immigration.

PTR (police, customs and border guard) co-operation is well-developed and allows the authorities to conduct each other's duties if necessary.

== Training ==
The basic training of border guard personnel is based in Imatra, while the sea training for coast guards is based in Turku.

== Equipment ==
=== Watercraft ===
Class	In service	Images	Type	Origin	Builder	Ship	Comm.	Displacement	Notes
Offshore patrol vessels
Turva class	1 (+ 2 on order)		Offshore patrol vessel (border surveillance, maritime SAR, EEZ monitoring, traffic monitoring, public order, environmental protection and oil spill response)	Finland	Rauma shipyard (STX Finland)	Turva	2014	4,000 t (3,900 long tons)	
Improved Turva class	0 (+ 2 on order)	–	Offshore patrol vessel (border surveillance, maritime SAR, evacuation, EEZ monitoring, traffic monitoring, public order, environmental protection and oil spill response)	Finland	Turku shipyard (Meyer Werft)	Karhu	2026 (plan)	–	
Improved Turva class	0 (+ 2 on order)	–	Offshore patrol vessel (border surveillance, maritime SAR, evacuation, EEZ monitoring, traffic monitoring, public order, environmental protection and oil spill response)	Finland	Turku shipyard (Meyer Werft)	–	2027 (plan)	–	
Tursas class	1		Offshore patrol vessel (border surveillance, maritime SAR, EEZ monitoring, traffic monitoring, public order)	Finland	Uusikaupunki shipyard (Rauma-Repola)	Uisko	1987	1,250 t (1,230 long tons)	To be replaced with the Improved Turva class. Lead ship Tursas was transferred to the Finnish Navy in January 2026.
Patrol boat
RV20 class	7	(illustration)	Patrol boat (border surveillance, maritime SAR, oil recovery)	Finland	Työvene shipyard	–	2020 to 2022	44.5 t (43.8 long tons)	Equipped with a small RHIB for recovery. Note: the RV90 was the prototype .
RV15E class	1		Patrol boat (border surveillance, maritime SAR, oil recovery, training)	Finland	Työvene shipyard	–	–	14.1 t (13.9 long tons)	First received in 2017.
Watercat 1300 class	23		Patrol boat (border surveillance, maritime SAR, oil recovery)	Finland	Marine Alutech Oy	–	2007 to 2013	17.2 t (16.9 long tons)	
Alucat W18 CAB6 RVL class	–	–	Patrol boat - inland waters (border surveillance, maritime SAR, oil recovery)	Finland	Marine Alutech Oy	–	–	–	
Speedboat
Zodiac MilPro SRA 850 (NV17 series)	26	–	RHIB	France	Zodiac MilPro	–	–	–	21 + 5 ordered in two phases.
Hovercraft
Griffon 2000TD class	3		Hovercraft	United Kingdom	Griffon Hoverwork	–	1994 to 1995	–	Received in the 1990s, to be replaced by new ones.
Griffon 2000TD class	0 (+ 3 on order)	–	Hovercraft	United Kingdom	Griffon Hoverwork	–	2026 to 2027	–	Order in December 2025.
Ivanoff IH-6	–		Rescue hovercraft	Sweden	Ivanoff Hovercraft AB	–	–	–	

=== Vehicles ===
Note: most vehicles are used as dog cars.

Model	Variant	Image	Origin	Type	Quantity	Notes
Road patrol vehicle
Mercedes-Benz Sprinter	Sprinter 319		Germany	4×4 heavy patrol van	–	
Mercedes-Benz Sprinter	Sprinter 419		Germany	4×4 heavy patrol van	–	
Mercedes-Benz Vito	–		Germany	Patrol van	–	Four variants used, among which the Mixto and the 129E (8-seat).
Volkswagen Transporter	VW T6		Germany	Patrol van	–	Two variants used.
Off-road patrol vehicle
Mercedes-Benz G-class	G350 (W463)	–	Germany	4×4 offroad patrol vehicle	–	
Toyota Land Cruiser	Land Cruiser J150	–	Japan	4×4 offroad patrol vehicle	–	
Toyota Hilux	Hilux (gen 7)	–	Japan	4×4 offroad patrol vehicle	–	
Volkswagen Amarok	–	–	Germany	4×4 offroad patrol vehicle	–	
Motorcycles
Yamaha WR250	–	–	Japan	Enduro motorcycle	–	
All-terrain vehicles
Polaris Sportsman 570	–	(illustration)	United States	Wheeled / tracked ATV	–	
Can-Am Max 650	–	(illustration)	Canada	ATV 6×6	–	
Snowmobile
Lynx Ranger 600 E-Tec	Wide-track	(illustration)	Finland	Snowmobiles	–	
Lynx Ranger 600 E-Tec	Narrow-track	(illustration)	Finland	Snowmobiles	–	

=== Aircraft ===
Model	Variant	Image	Origin	Type	Quantity	Notes
Aeroplanes (2)
Dornier 228	Dornier 228–212		Germany	Surveillance aircraft	2	In service since 1995, to be replaced by the Bombardier Challenger 650 (Rapcon-X) from 2027.
Bombardier Challenger 650	SNC Rapcon-X		Canada; United States	Intelligence, surveillance, reconnaissance aircraft	0 (+ 2 on order)	Successor of the Dornier surveillance aircraft, selected in the MVX proggramme. The Border Guard ordered 2 Bombardier Challenger 650 in June 2024. The critical design review was completed in March 2025. The deliveries are planned for 2027 and 2028.
Helicopters (12)
Agusta-Bell 412	AB412EP		United States; Italy (licence made)	Border control, maritime SAR, medical transport	5	Purchased in the 1980s.
AgustaWestland AW119	AW119Ke		Italy	Border control, transport, civil service duties	4	3 ordered in 2008, with an option for 1 additional helicopter which ended up being exercised. Equipment: thermal camera, forest fire suppression.
Eurocopter Super Puma	AS 332L1 / H215		France	Transport, border control, maritime SAR, medical transport	3	3 AS 332 purchased in the mid-1980s. These were modernised in the 2010s, and equipped with new surveillance equipment.
Eurocopter Super Puma	AS332L1e / H215		France	Transport, border control, maritime SAR, medical transport	2	2 additional Super Puma ordered in 2013. They were modernised to the Airbus H215 standard. The first was delivered in 2016.

=== Other equipment ===
Officers carry on a daily basis:

- TETRA
- Sidearm
- Pepper spray
- Taser - model X2 by Axon Enterprise
- Baton (law enforcement)
- Handcuffs
- Light and heavy ballistic armor
- Military working dogs - The Finnish Border Guard has K9 units on every district. The most popular working dog breeds are German Shepherd and Belgian Malinois.

== History ==
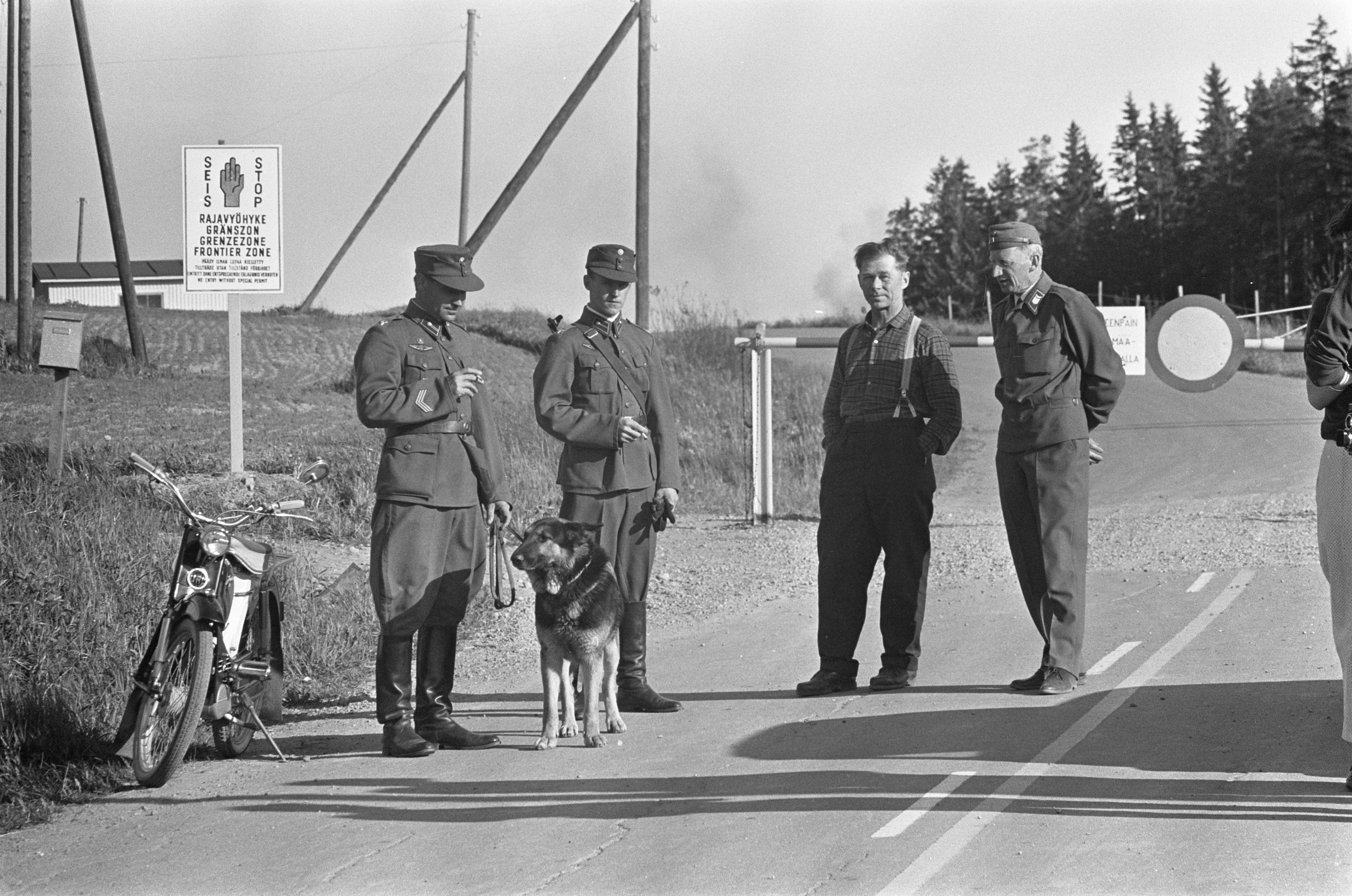
Finnish border guards chatting with a villager at the Finnish-Russian border at Imatra, on 5 July 1967.

After the Finnish Civil War in 1919, the control of the Finnish borders was given to the former Finnish Russian frontier troops under the command of the Ministry of Interior. Until 1945, only the Russian border was supervised by the Frontier Guard, the Swedish and Norwegian borders having only customs control. In 1929, a separate Sea Guard was founded to prevent the rampant alcohol smuggling caused by the Finnish prohibition of alcohol (1919–1932).

At the start of the Winter War there were nine Border Companies (Rajakomppania) on the Karelian Isthmus. North of Lake Ladoga the Frontier Guards were combined into six Detached Battalions (Erillinen pataljoona). Further north in Petsamo the defence was left to the 10th Detached Company (10. Erillinen komppania). After the war Marshal Mannerheim awarded all frontier guards the title "Border jäger" (Rajajääkäri). During the Continuation War, the Frontier Guard companies were combined into 12 Border Jäger battalions (Rajajääkäripataljoona) and later during the Lapland War into a Border Jäger Brigade (Rajajääkäriprikaati).

== Ranks ==
=== Commissioned officer ranks ===
The rank insignia of commissioned officers.

NATO code	OF-10	OF-9	OF-8	OF-7	OF-6	OF-5	OF-4	OF-3	OF-2	OF-1
(Finland) Finnish Border Guard
(Finland) Finnish Border Guard		Kenraali/ Amiraali	Kenraaliluutnantti/ Vara-amiraali	Kenraalimajuri/ Kontra-amiraali	Prikaatikenraali/ Lippueamiraali	Eversti/ Kommodori	Everstiluutnantti/ Komentaja	Majuri/ Komentajakapteeni	Kapteeni/ Kapteeniluutnantti	Yliluutnantti/ Yliluutnantti	Luutnantti/ Luutnantti	Vänrikki/ Aliluutnantti
(Finland) Finnish Border Guard		General/ Amiral	Generallöjtnant/ Viceamiral	Generalmajor/ Konteramiral	Brigadgeneral/ Flottiljamiral	Överste/ Kommodor	Överstelöjtnant/ Kommendör	Major/ Kommendörkapten	Kapten/ Kaptenlöjtnant	Premiärlöjtnant	Löjtnant	Fänrik/ Underlöjtnant

=== Other ranks ===
The rank insignia of non-commissioned officers and enlisted personnel.

NATO code	OR-9	OR-8	OR-7	OR-6	OR-5	OR-4	OR-3	OR-2	OR-1
(Finland) Finnish Border Guard
(Finland) Finnish Border Guard	Sotilasmestari	Ylivääpeli/ Ylipursimies	Vääpeli/ Pursimies	Ylikersantti	Kersantti	Alikersantti	Korpraali/ Ylimatruusi	Sotamies
(Finland) Finnish Border Guard	Militärmästare	Överfältväbel/ Överbåtsman	Fältväbel/ Båtsman	Översergeant	Sergeant	Undersergeant	Korpral/ Övermatros	Soldat

== Current activities ==
After the Second World War, the Border Guards were placed on all Finnish borders. In the 1950s, the Sea Guard was attached to the Border Guard. Since then, the Border Guard has received a fine public image. It is famed for the wilderness skills of its guards foot-patrolling the forest-covered Russian border, its good efficiency in catching the few illegal border crossers and for the fact that it is the only state authority in large parts of Lapland. In these matters it resembles the popular image of the Royal Canadian Mounted Police. The Border Guard of Finland is one of the links of the chain of protectors of the external borders of the European Union and Schengen agreement.

Nearly every Border Guard District trains small number of conscripts for long range reconnaissance (Finnish: Sissi). Conscripts in Border Guard companies are mostly volunteers and preferably selected from the occupants of border areas, and while trained by Border Guard, they do not perform regular border control duties. Rivalry between Sissi from Border Guards and Defence Forces is traditionally high.

Employment in Border Guard is much sought for, especially in North and Eastern Finland, which suffer from chronic unemployment problems. Typically a vacancy in the Border Guard receives at least 50 applications.

== See also ==
- Crime in Finland
- Finnish Security Intelligence Service
- Frontex (The European Agency for the Management of Operational Cooperation at the External Borders of the Member States of the European Union)
- Law enforcement in Finland
- National Bureau of Investigation (Finland)
- Police of Finland
