= Law enforcement in Finland =

The sword and lion emblem is the symbol of the Police of Finland

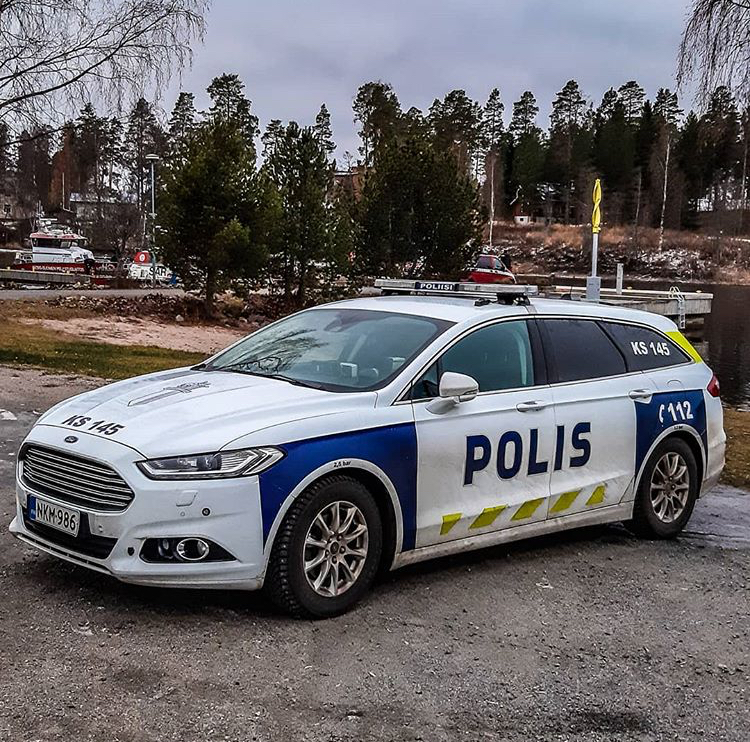
A Finnish police car with the latest livery

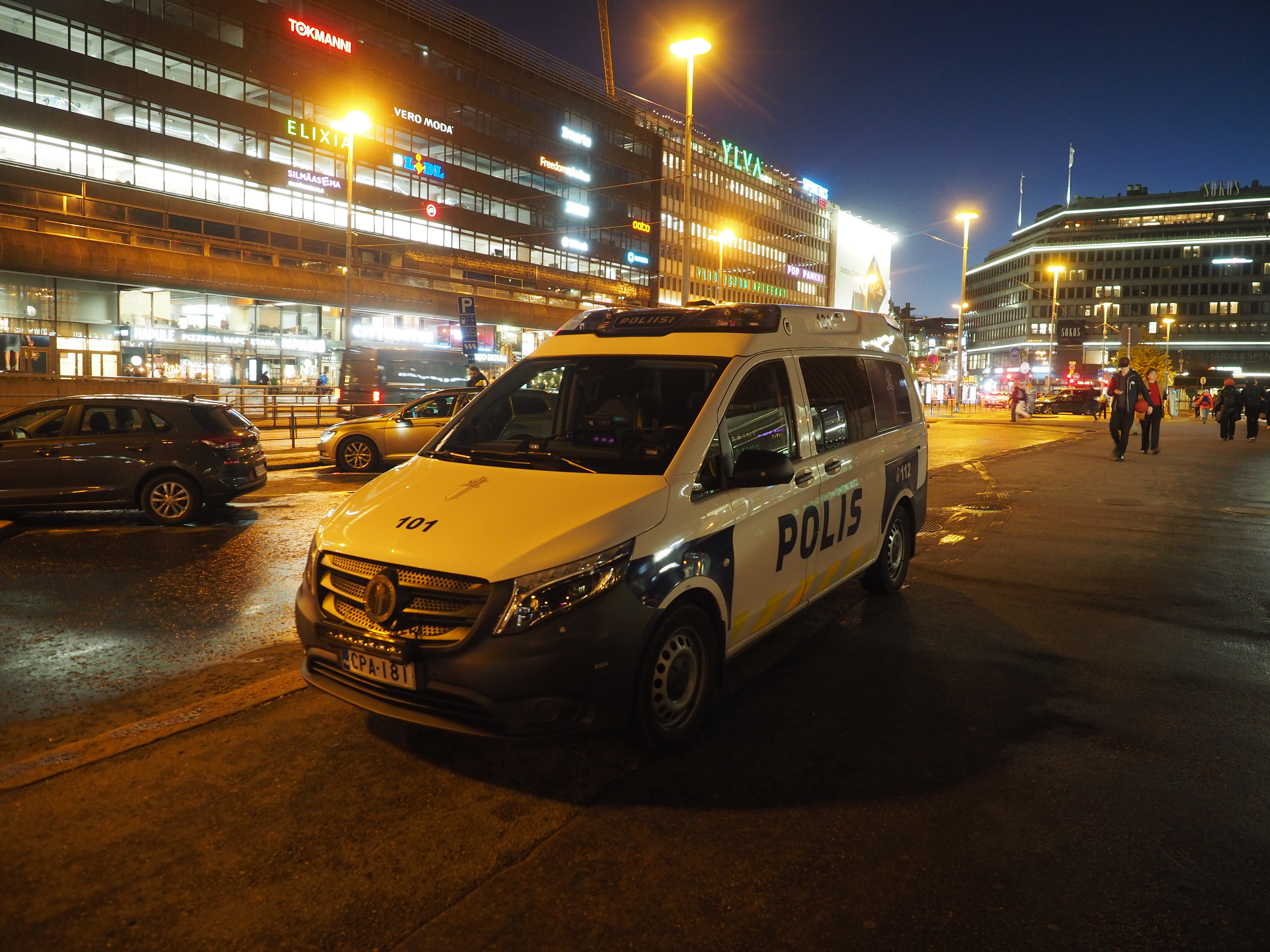
Police van in Helsinki

Law enforcement in Finland is the responsibility of several agencies. The Police of Finland, a national police agency, is responsible for most tasks. The two other main agencies are the Finnish Border/Coast Guards and the Finnish Customs. Examples of other agencies with limited policing powers are the Finnish Defence Forces, municipal parking inspectors and railway staff.

== Law enforcement agencies ==
=== Police of Finland ===
The Police of Finland is subordinate to the Ministry of the Interior and divided into the National Police Board, two national units and 11 local police departments. Within departments, there is a division between uniformed patrol police (järjestyspoliisi, "order police") and criminal investigation (rikospoliisi, "crime police"). The function of each police department is to maintain general law and order, prevent crime, investigate crime and other events that threaten public order and safety, carry out traffic control and surveillance, and promote traffic safety.

The Police University College (Poliisiammattikorkeakoulu, Polamk) is the national university-level unit responsible for general police training, research and development. The National Bureau of Investigation (Keskusrikospoliisi, KRP) is the national unit tasked with fighting international, organised and serious crime.

=== Finnish Security Intelligence Service ===
The Finnish Security Intelligence Service (Suojelupoliisi, Supo) specializes in the prevention of security threats of the State, such as counterintelligence and terrorism. Supo was an agency under police administration, but was transferred under the direct control of the Ministry of the Interior in 2016.

=== Border Guard and Customs ===
The Finnish Border Guard have police powers in border zones; likewise, Finnish Customs have police powers when dealing with arriving persons and goods. Within their fields of work, the Customs and Border Guard officers have most police powers. In the Customs, the power to arrest is delegated to the level of senior customs inspectors. In the Border Guard, the power to arrest is delegated to the level of border control detachments commander. The Border Guard is also responsible for search and rescue and maritime search and rescue. The Customs may utilize all investigative police powers, with the exception of the use of deep-cover personnel and sting operations. The Border Guard may use almost all investigative powers. The Customs also occasionally enforces laws such as fuel taxes and vehicle traffic-worthiness, without connection to imported goods.

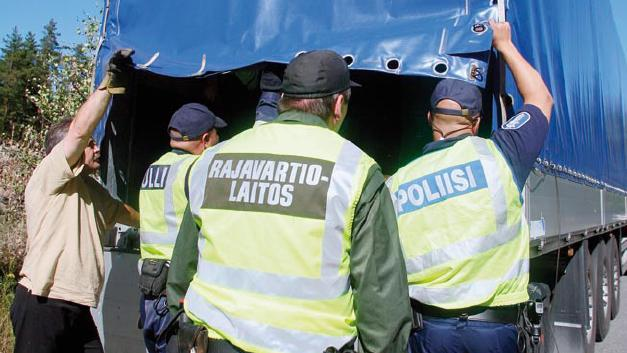
Police, Customs and Border Guard have close inter-agency cooperation.

PCB (police, border guard and customs) is a scheme for cooperation between the police, border guard and customs. In a PCB patrol, there is a patrol from two of the agencies: For instance, two officers from customs and two from police – who then get acquainted with each other's tasks and expertise. Another form of PCB cooperation is in criminal intelligence – whereby the different disciplines share the same intelligence and situation centers.

=== Finnish Defence Forces ===
The Finnish Defence Forces have provost duties and jurisdiction within military installations. The Defence Forces also have the right to investigate all military crimes and most crimes committed by service-men against non-civilians. In addition, the Defence Forces have the right to conduct counter-espionage and counter-sabotage activities related to national defence. However, the Finnish Security Intelligence Service conducts actual criminal investigations of state security-related crimes within the Defence Forces. Military unit commanders have jurisdiction of investigations over minor infractions.

The power to arrest is delegated to the company commander level. More serious crimes are investigated by the investigative section of the Finnish Defence Command or by the military attorneys of lower command levels. Security-related military police activities and all technical surveillance activities are carried out by the investigative section of the Defence Command. The Defence Forces do not have the right to conduct wiretaps or other similar measures on Finnish civilian telecommunications.

The police may request assistance in performing their duties from the Defence Forces or other agencies – for example when special equipment or competency is required. The operation itself remains under the command of the police. Military units (brigades) usually keep a company under readiness for assistance at all times; the turn rotates among companies and requires them to forego regular leave. In practice, the Defence Forces have assisted in disposal of explosives, provided Pasi armored vehicles for operations against heavily armed suspects (e.g. the Kauhajoki shooting), and conscript manpower for searching missing persons in terrain and in supporting the 2015 refugee crisis. Finnish military police and investigative command would assume a more extensive set of tasks in wartime.

=== Miscellaneous ===
Games and fisheries wardens (erätarkastaja) are law enforcement officials employed by Metsähallitus ("Forest Administration"), who inspect and enforce permits within state-owned lands managed by Metsähallitus. The wardens have the same police training and powers as regular police.

Nuclear security guards (turvahenkilö) have a special status defined in the Nuclear Energy Act (1987), different from that of regular private security guards or regular police. They are empowered as "personnel temporarily assisting the police", and as such, have the same right to use force as the police, provided that the police is immediately informed of an incident. In practice, nuclear security guards are equipped with firearms such as shotguns and submachine guns, which is not generally permitted for private security guards. Nuclear security guards are employed either by a security company or the power company itself.

Municipal parking inspectors, train conductors and ticket inspectors, and games and fishing inspectors have limited police powers.

The Ministry of the Interior has the authority to grant police powers to any person for a specific task and to the degree necessary.

== Voluntary support ==
The Police of Finland is supported by two voluntary organisations: Vapepa, the voluntary rescue service (Finnish: Vapaaehtoinen pelastuspalvelu), and the SRVA, the assistance organisation for large game situations (Finnish: suurriistavirka-apu). Neither organisation uses police powers during assistance missions.

The most typical support mission for the Vapepa is a search mission. The organisation is composed of volunteers trained in the search of missing persons, who can be alerted by the local police for a search with a reasonably short response time. For example, in a recent case, the person was reported missing at 4 PM, the Vapepa search operation started with 42 volunteers at 7 PM, and continued at 7 AM the following morning, after being stopped at 4 AM, with more than 100 volunteers. In addition, the Vapepa may support police in communications or first-response logistics and psychological care.

The SRVA is a voluntary activity organised by the semi-governmental hunting district associations (Finnish: riistanhoitoyhdistys). The SRVA personnel are experienced hunters trained for police assistance, and they provide hounds and armed hunters to track and euthanise large game that has been wounded in a traffic accident or that police has decided to euthanise to prevent danger to human safety.

== See also ==
- Crime in Finland
- Judicial system of Finland
- Law of Finland
