= National Bureau of Investigation (Finland) =

National law enforcement agency of Finland

Coordinates: 60.29192°N 25.05456°E

National Bureau of Investigation Keskusrikospoliisi Centralkriminalpolisen
- The sword and lion emblem is the symbol of the Police of Finland

Agency overview
- Formed: December 30, 1954
- Employees: 696 (31 December 2016)
- Annual budget: €72.5 million (FY 2016)

Jurisdictional structure
- Operations jurisdiction: Finland
- General nature: Civilian police

Operational structure
- Headquarters: Jokiniemenkuja 4, Vantaa, Finland
- Elected officer responsible: Minister of the Interior, Mari Rantanen
- Agency executives: Robin Lardot, Director; Tero Kurenmaa, Assistant Director
- Parent agency: National Police Board under the Ministry of the Interior

Website
- www.poliisi.fi/en/national_bureau_of_investigation

The National Bureau of Investigation (NBI; Finnish: Keskusrikospoliisi (KRP), Swedish: Centralkriminalpolisen (CKP), lit. 'central criminal police') is a national law enforcement agency of the Finnish Police and the principal criminal investigation and criminal intelligence organization of Finland. The Bureau's main tasks are to counter and investigate organized crime, provide expert services, and develop methods for criminal investigation. NBI is also responsible for financial intelligence (FININT), such as preventing money laundering and terrorism financing. NBI headquarters has been situated in the city of Vantaa within the Capital Region since 1994 with field offices in Tampere, Turku, Mariehamn, Joensuu, Oulu and Rovaniemi. It is subordinate to the National Police Board under the jurisdiction of the Interior Ministry.

== History ==
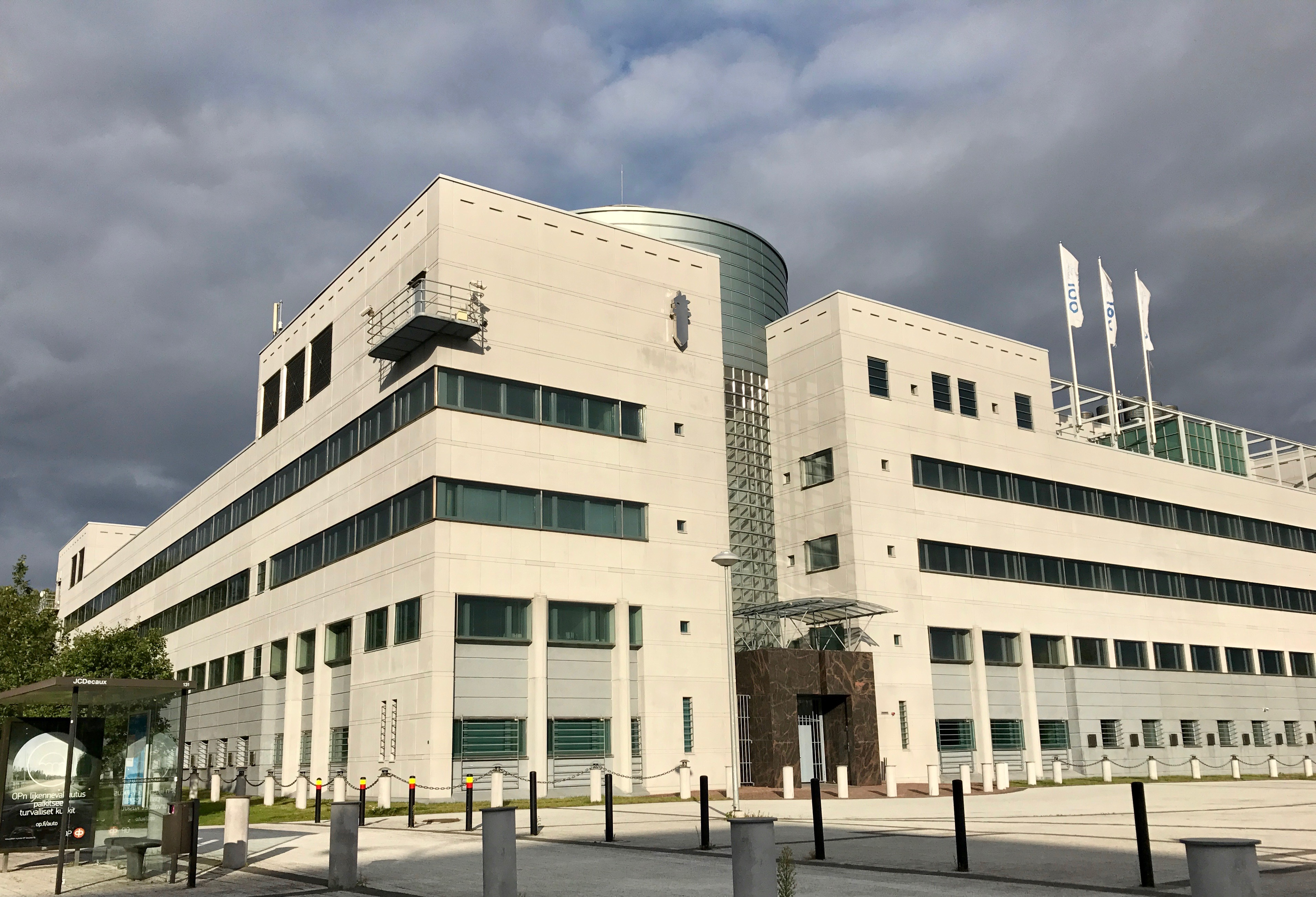
The NBI headquarters in Tikkurila, Vantaa

The National Bureau of Investigation (NBI) was established on 30 December 1954 upon ratification of Act 510/1954 and became operational in 1955 by merging the Uusimaa Province Crime Police Centre (Finnish: Uudenmaan läänin rikospoliisikeskus) and the Crime Research Centre (Finnish: Rikostutkimuskeskus). Previously, the Crime Police Centre had been handling nationwide investigations while the Crime Research Centre was in charge of intelligence and forensic analyses. Kosti Vasa was appointed NBI's first Director and served as such until retiring in 1965.

In the wake of the 2004 Indian Ocean earthquake and tsunami, NBI's Finnish Disaster Victim Identification Team (DVI) was dispatched to identify Finnish victims in Thailand. 173 out of the 178 Finns missing in Thailand were eventually identified. In April 2013, NBI came under public pressure after it was revealed that the Bureau had collected mostly indirectly connected information of suspicious persons with possible links to organized crime into a secret intelligence database. Russian president Vladimir Putin was one of the persons recorded after his interaction with the motorcycle club Night Wolves. According to prosecutors, the database was lacking proper controls and vulnerable to unauthorized use. Reporters speculated in the media that having a record in the database could possibly cause financial losses and social exclusion for registered persons—who had no means to verify or be aware if they had been recorded. By April 2016, 97.3% of the nearly 50 000 entries had been determined legal and the rest deleted.

Robin Lardot started as the Director in October 2013 and initiated an organizational reform by concentrating five of the former departments into three divisions and by reducing leadership positions. The reform was completed on 1 January 2015. Similarly, a new unit targeting cyber crime was established at the Bureau's headquarters in April 2015 with a preliminarily number of 45 staff. The unit's chief named concentrated cyber attacks as Finland's greatest threat at the time. In March 2015, the Bureau opened its first official Twitter account and in August 2015, opened its doors for the first time to the public and allowed visitors to see contents of the Bureau's Crime Museum as well as art forgeries kept inside its headquarters.

NBI was in charge of investigating the Turku stabbing of August 2017; considered Finland's first suspected terrorist attack since the end of World War II.

== Mandate and organization ==
=== Mandate ===
NBI's mandate per law is to 1) counter international, organised, professional, financial and other serious crime; 2) investigate aforementioned offences; 3) provide expert services; 4) develop methods for criminal investigation; and 5) perform witness protection. It states that investigates high-profile offences, such as

- criminal cases of major importance to the society, such as cybercrime, corruption, securities fraud and environmental crime;
- homicides with likely connections to organised crime; and
- terrorist offences, unless agreed otherwise with the Finnish Security Intelligence Service.

The Bureau states that it engages in different operational activities, such as detecting and preventing money laundering and terrorism financing, taking part in major disaster investigations through the Finnish Disaster Victim Identification Team (DVI), and coordinating combined PCB (Police Customs Border) criminal intelligence organised around the National PCB Criminal Intelligence Centre and the PCB Intelligence Units specialised in air, sea and land traffic. NBI hosts the national centres of Interpol, Europol and Schengen cooperation as well as develops new forensic investigation methods, equipment and material for the police force.

=== Organization ===
In the fiscal year 2016, the National Bureau of Investigation's budget was approximately 72.5 million euros. NBI headquarters has been located in the Tikkurila district of Vantaa within the Capital region area since 1994. The Bureau also hosts field offices in Tampere, Turku, Mariehamn, Joensuu, Oulu and Rovaniemi. The headquarters houses the Crime Museum, which holds about 6 000 pieces of criminal history, including tools used in crimes and punishment as well as documents and photos with most of the collections from the 20th century. As of January 2014, NBI has been divided into three divisions in addition to administrative services:

- Criminal Investigation Division
- Criminal Intelligence Division
- Forensic Laboratory

The Criminal Investigation Division is further divided into sections on organised crime, homicide, financial crime and information gathering—and the Criminal Intelligence Division contains a separate section on international affairs as well as a Financial Intelligence Unit (FIU). NBI had 696 staff, of whom 39% were women, at the end of 2016. Most of the Bureau's personnel serve as law enforcement officers (60%) mainly in investigative and intelligence duties. Civilian staff include experts, such as chemists, laboratory assistants, clerks, engineers and linguists.

== See also ==
- Crime in Finland
- Finnish Border Guard
- Finnish Security Intelligence Service
- International criminal law
- Judicial system of Finland
- Law enforcement in Finland
