= Antti Isotalo (Jäger) =

Finnish 20th-century war-time lieutenant

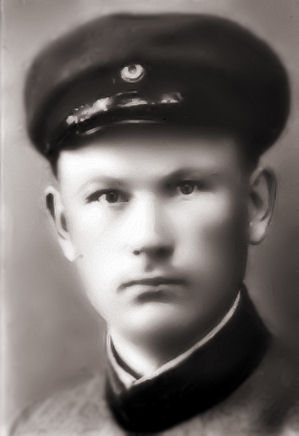
Antti Isotalo in 1938.

Antti Isotalo (13 January 1895 – 17 March 1964) was a Finnish Jäger lieutenant, military recruiter, farmer and activist. He served in the German Empire's battalion of Finnish volunteers on the Eastern Front of World War I and briefly in the Finnish Civil War (1918) on the Whites' side. He repeatedly evaded capture by authorities while recruiting men for the battalion in 1915 and 1916. After recovering from wounds sustained in the civil war, he recruited volunteers for the Estonian War of Independence and then joined the Aunus expedition as one of its commanders during Finland's "tribal wars" in 1919.

Later, after spending three years as a migrant worker in Australia in the mid-to-late 1920s, he returned to Finland and was an active member of the far-right Lapua Movement and its successor, the Patriotic People's Movement. He was involved in the failed Mäntsälä rebellion (1932), ran for parliament and spent most of the Winter War as a commandant on the homefront. He then served in Karelia during the Continuation War, where his presence inspired the younger enlisted men. Lastly, he was the local leader of Alko (the Finnish alcohol monopoly) in Seinäjoki from 1945 until 1958. After withdrawing from partisan politics, he described himself as a political "nihilist" and "nonpartisan anti-communist." His reputation was described in "Kuularuiskulaulu", a song first recorded in the 1930s which remained popular during the Continuation War.

== Early life ==
Isotalo was born into a farming family in Alahärmä, Western Finland. He had to take charge of his family's 120-acre farm at the age of 13 after his father was stabbed to death while collecting a debt in 1908. His grandfather, the famous knife-fighter of the same name (who had previously spent 13 years in prison and turned to faith), instructed him with the running of the farm until his own death three years later. Rather than turning to crime at an early age like his father and grandfather, Isotalo was active in youth clubs and helped build a sports field in his home village.

== In the Jäger Movement ==
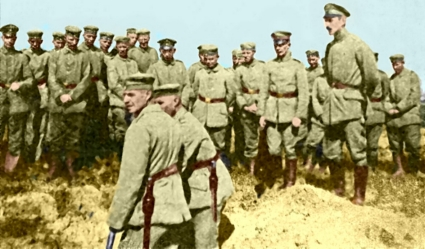
Members of the 27th Jäger Battalion in training at Polangen.

Isotalo was introduced to the Jäger Movement through his youth club activities in October 1915, became interested in it and decided to join the 27th Jäger Battalion, a Finnish volunteer battalion in the Royal Prussian Army consisting of young men intent on fighting for their nation's independence from Russia. He crossed the Kvarken to Sweden by motorboat with a group of other volunteers, reached the city of Umeå after a two-day voyage in the midst of a storm, traveled to Southern Sweden by train and sailed to Germany from there. He signed up at the Jäger Battalion and its 1st Company on 20 October and entered basic training at Lockstedt.

After a month of training at Lockstedt, Isotalo was ordered to recruit more men from his native region, Southern Ostrobothnia. He was sent to Stockholm with a forged passport and returned to Finland by land in late November. He met with local activists and used his false identity to appear in public and encourage men to join the Jäger Movement. He personally recruited dozens of men in the region, and up to two hundred Jägers were said to have stopped by at his home on their way to Germany. The Russian authorities initially interpreted these men's departure as emigration to America but soon learned that Isotalo had been recruiting men for the Germans (who were at war with Russia at the time). He became a regular target of the police and military police.

The first attempt at arresting Isotalo was made in December 1915. He was armed with a handgun and intimidated the police into backing down. He continued recruiting; among his possible recruits at this point was Taavetti Laatikainen, later a general in World War II. Another attempt at arrest was made on 9 July 1916. After a long shootout in which a policeman was wounded and the coastal guard was called in, Isotalo managed to escape, hid for a week, returned to Germany and was sent to the Eastern Front. The Jäger Battalion reached its membership goal during the seven months Isotalo was active as a recruiter.

After serving roughly a month on the Eastern Front, Isotalo was again assigned to special operations in Finland in September 1916. This time, the intention was to attack the Russian regime's military police and their collaborators in the country. After a plan to bomb a house belonging to the military police in Jakobstad was canceled after the explosives were not delivered in time and the attempted murder of informant Nikolai Syynimaa failed, Isotalo retreated to Sweden at the end of September. He returned to Finland in late November with a plan to assassinate Axel Fabian af Enehjelm, the governor of Oulu, whom the Jägers accused of wrongfully executing Taavetti Lukkarinen (a man who had assisted German prisoners of war). The plan was called off, and Isotalo and another Jäger named J. W. Snellman instead shot and killed Matti Palomäki, a police officer from Tervola who had been involved in Lukkarinen's capture. A report by Isotalo indicated that Snellman was the one to pull the trigger, although some contemporaries questioned this.

By late 1916 and early 1917, Isotalo was one of the most wanted men in Finland. Governor-General Franz Albert Seyn had ordered a massive search for him known as the "Siege of Härmä" and af Enehjelm convinced the Swedish authorities to treat Jägers as dangerous criminals. Swedish police surprised Isotalo in Haparanda in late January, but he evaded capture by running off into the snow-covered woods without shoes. He returned to Germany in February, completed his training at Lockstedt, Libau and Polangen, and was promoted to hilfsgruppenführer (auxiliary squad leader) at autumn 1917. He entered the Finnish White Army as a varavääpeli (equivalent to a rank between staff sergeant and sergeant 1st class) in February 1918 and was a ceremonial flagbearer when the Jägers swore their oath to the nation of Finland at the Holy Trinity Cathedral in Libau before leaving their German service.

== Finnish Civil War, tribal wars, World War II and later life ==
Isotalo arrived in Vaasa, Finland along with the main body of Jägers on 25 February 1918. He was assigned to lead a platoon and participated in the Battle of Tampere––the largest battle in Nordic military history at the time––but his service was cut short when a bullet pierced his thigh on Maundy Thursday, 28 March, and he was unable to keep fighting.

Isotalo was on sick leave and unable to take part in the first tribal expedition in the summer of 1918 due to the wounds he received in the civil war. He resigned from the army in November 1918 and recruited volunteers for the Estonian War of Independence in early 1919. The same year, he joined a group of Finnish volunteers in the Aunus expedition, the largest expedition of the tribal wars, where he led his company to victories early on and had a major role in the conquest of Olonets (Aunuksenkaupunki). His actions during this time inspired a popular song (Kuularuiskulaulu), but his victories had no long-term impact as the expedition eventually ended in defeat, partly due to a lack of support from the Finnish government.

Soon after the Aunus expedition ended, Isotalo joined the defense of Porajärvi. Allowed virtual autonomy during his stay there between October 1919 and January 1920, his company skirmished with the Bolsheviks and briefly cooperated with the Russian Whites to attack a nearby municipality, but the Russians left in the middle of the attack; Isotalo chose not to cooperate with them further after that and focused his attentions on defence. Porajärvi would remain under Finnish control until it was exchanged for Petsamo in the Peace of Tartu.

In December 1921, Isotalo joined the Forest Guerrillas in the East Karelian uprising, the last of the tribal wars. He was assigned to command a ski battalion. The guerrillas were successful at first, capturing much of White Karelia, but their lack of equipment and support forced them on the defence before they could reach what later became the Kirov Railway. In late January 1922, the Red Army decisively defeated the heavily outnumbered, outgunned and demoralised guerrillas, many of whom deserted. Isotalo was abandoned by his unit and nearly became a prisoner of war. After a brief plan to recruit another company, Isotalo was discharged and allowed to return home at the turn of February.

Isotalo lived and worked in Australia between 1924 and 1927. He spent most of this time as a construction worker, but also harvested sugarcane at some point. After returning to Finland, he worked in forestry and then at a bank in his home village in Alahärmä. He was active in the far-right anti-communist Lapua Movement and the Patriotic People's Movement from the late 1920s and was involved in the Lapua Movement's uprising known as the Mäntsälä rebellion in 1932. After it failed, he received work as an inspector at Alko, the Finnish alcohol monopoly.

A severe stomach ulcer prevented Isotalo from fighting in the Winter War (1939–40), but he served as a commandant on the homefront and was briefly in the staff of fellow Jäger Matti Laurila's regiment toward the end of the war. After a surgery, he was able to join the Continuation War in 1941, served in Soviet Karelia and was promoted to lieutenant. He was discharged based on age in June 1942. After the war, he was appointed the local leader of Alko in Seinäjoki in 1945, and remained in that capacity until his retirement in 1958. He died in Seinäjoki on 17 March 1964, aged 69.

== Sources ==
- Niinistö, Jussi: Isontalon Antti : eteläpohjalainen jääkäri, värväri ja seitsemän sodan veteraani. Helsinki: Suomalaisen Kirjallisuuden Seura, 2008. ISBN 978-951-746-979-1. (in Finnish)
- Antti Isotalo. Kansallisbiografia. (in Finnish)
- Suomen jääkärien elämäkerrasto 1975 (in Finnish)
