= Griffon Hoverwork 2000TD =

Light-weight hovercraft

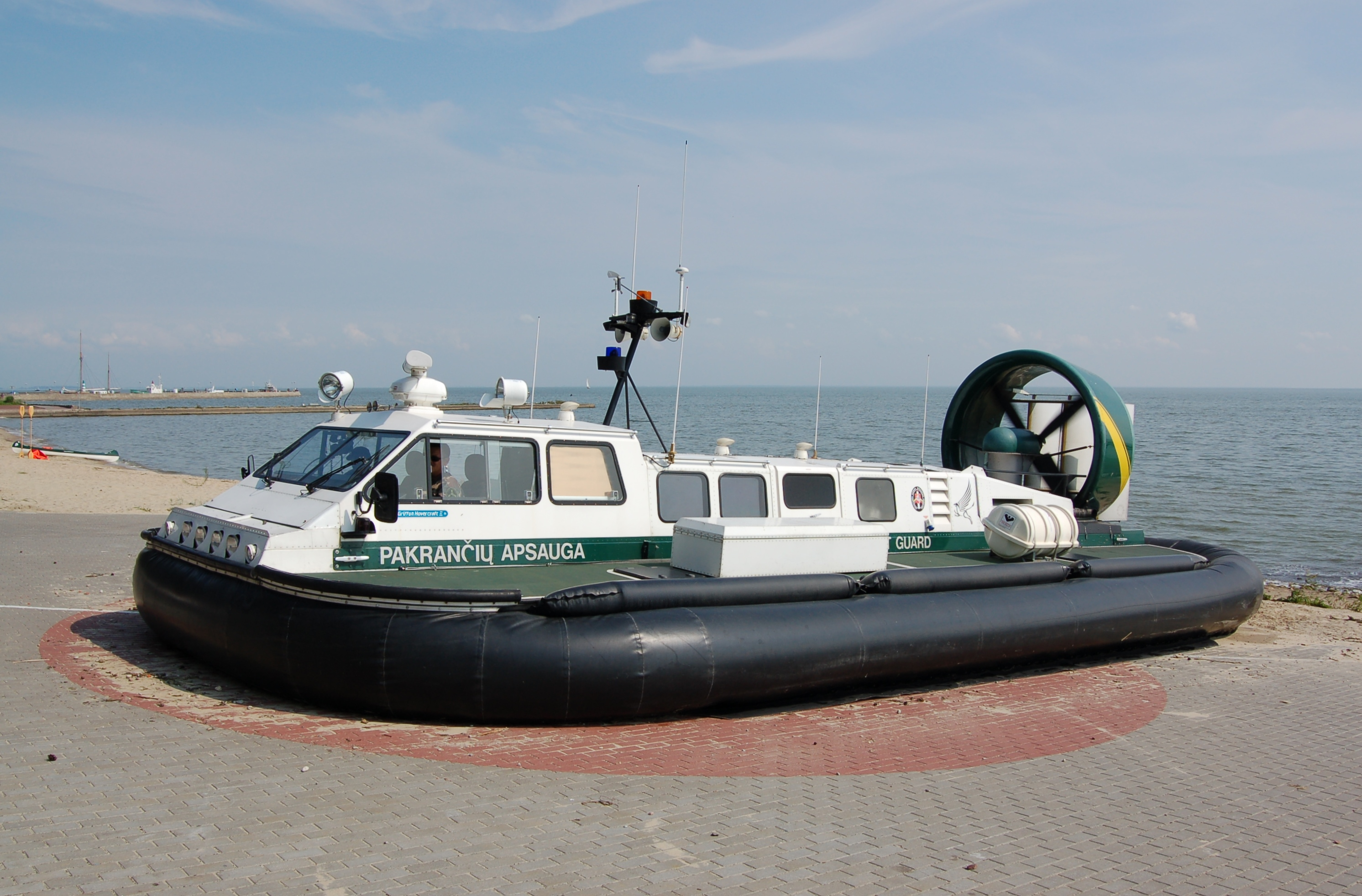
- A Griffon 2000TDX Mk II hovercraft, Christina, of the Lithuanian State Border Police in 2006

Class overview
- Builders: Griffon Hoverwork, United Kingdom

General characteristics
- Type: Hovercraft
- Displacement: 3.5 tons (civilian); 6.8 tons (military)
- Length: 11.7 metres
- Beam: 5.9 metres
- Propulsion: 1 Deutz diesel engine 350 horsepower for lift and propulsion
- Speed: 35 knots (at sea state 3)
- Crew: 3 (minimum 1)
- Notes: 20 Passengers

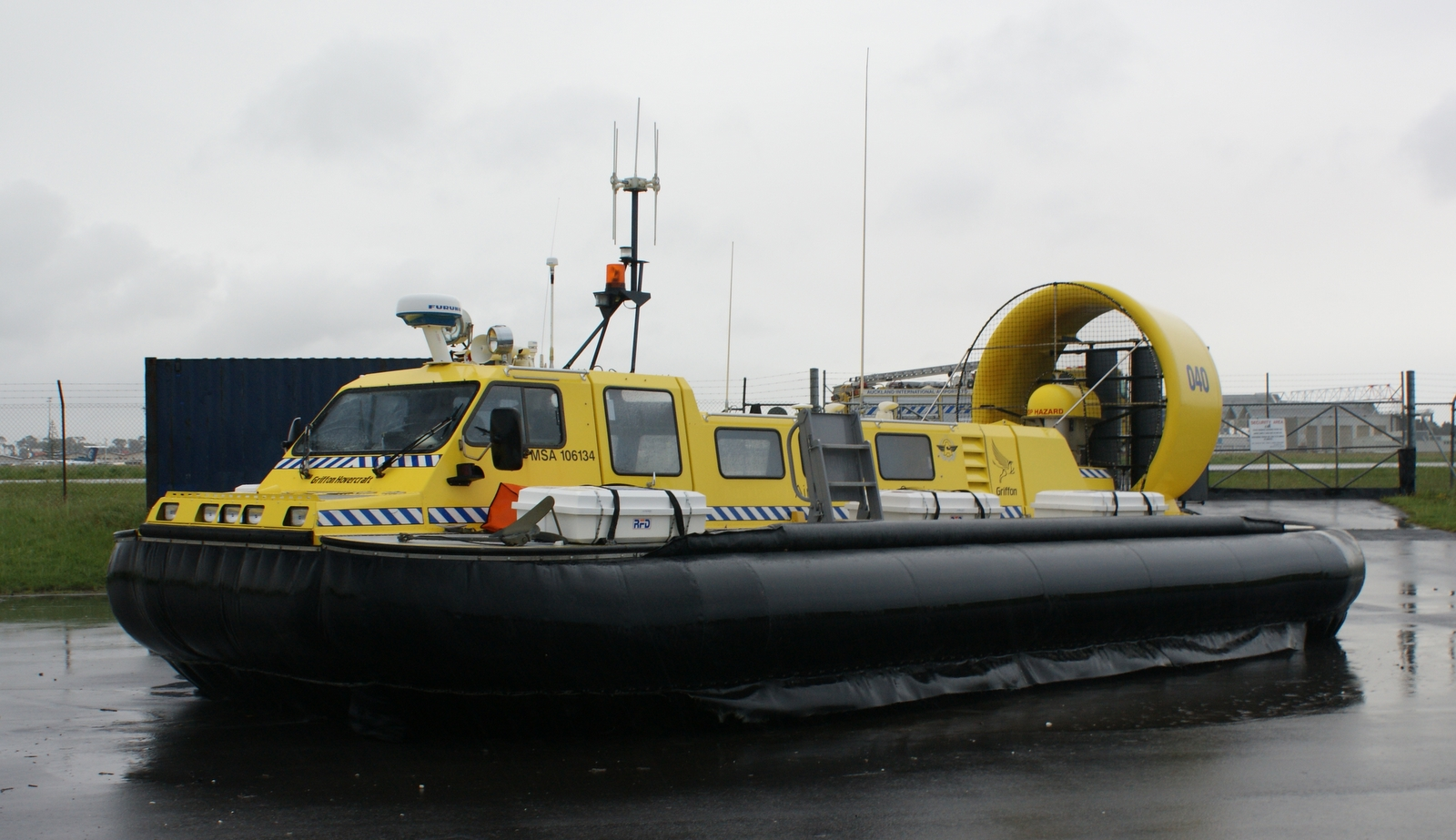
Griffon 2000 of Auckland International Airport Emergency Services in 2009

Griffon 2000 operated by Swedish Amphibious Corps in 2014

The Griffon 2000 series is a light-weight hovercraft built in the United Kingdom by Griffon Hoverwork and used principally by military and rescue organisations.

== Background ==
Griffon Hoverwork (GHL) of Hythe, England has designed, manufactured and operated hovercraft for over 40 years.

GHL was the first manufacturer to use turbo-diesel engines on hovercraft, which increases durability compared to conventional petrol engines when exposed to salt water conditions. The company produces an extensive range of hovercraft, with payloads between 0.38 and 12 tonnes.

== Commercial use ==
For eight years GHL operated a passenger service up and down the River Thames in London, and hovercraft were the only vehicles allowed to operate at high speed along the river, as they produce very little wash or wake.

Hovertravel currently uses a Griffon Hoverwork designed 12000TD craft to provide a passenger route between Southsea, Portsmouth and Ryde, Isle of Wight.

Société des Traversiers du Québec in Québec, Canada was provided in 2012 with a 2000TD to operate a passenger service between Pakuashipi and Saint-Augustin during the periods the ice bridge linking the two communities is not open.

== Military use ==
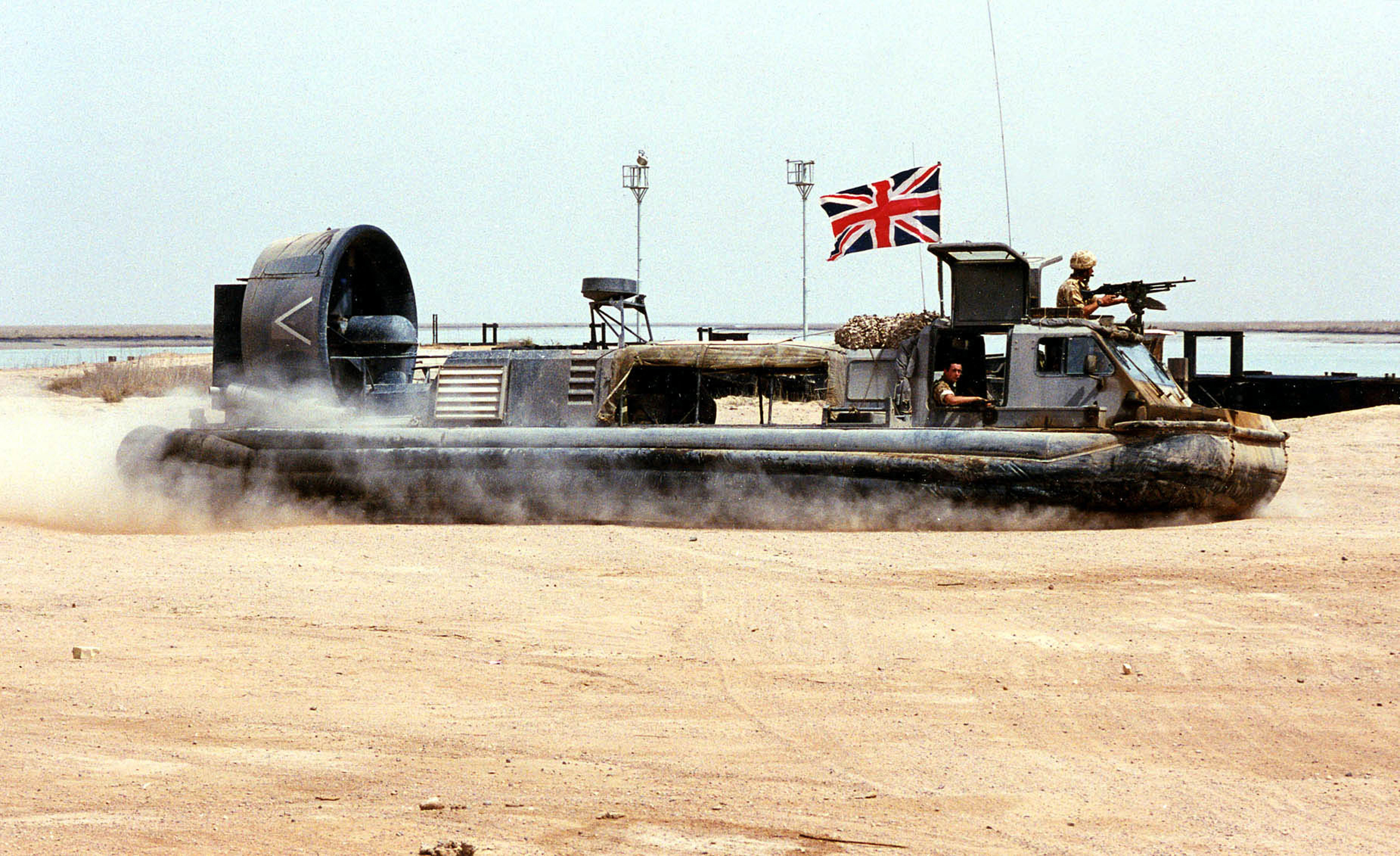
Royal Marine Hovercraft on Patrol in Iraq

Griffon Hoverwork hovercraft have been purchased by several armies, navies and paramilitary organisations throughout the World, and several remain on order. The hovercraft can be configured to carry troops or cargo, with optional extras such as armoured glass and ballistic protection.

- Belgian Army: 1 craft. Acquired in 1995. Exposed cargo deck only. Used for drone recovery and artillery range patrol. No weapons. Radical Decca, I-band radar.
  - Barbara A 999
- Colombian Naval Infantry: 8 craft.
  - ARC 331
  - ARC 332
  - ARC 333
  - ARC 334
  - ARC 335
  - ARC 336
  - ARC 337
  - ARC 338
- Estonian Border Guard: 1 craft. Acquired in 1999. Capable of transporting 16 troops or 2 tons of equipment.
  - PVH 1
- Finland: Border Guard: 7 craft. First craft acquired on 1 December 1994. Third craft acquired June 1995. Can be embarked in an LCU. Similar configuration to Estonian craft.
- Lithuanian Border Police: 1 craft. Acquired in 2000. Similar configuration to Estonian craft. Furuno 1000C, I-band radar.
  - Christina
- Pakistan Marines: 4 craft
- Peruvian Navy: 7 craft
- Polish Border Guard
  - SG-411
  - SG-412
- Swedish Coast Guard: First military version of the 2000TD series to be constructed. 2 crafts in operation delivered in 1993 (KVB 592) and 2011 (KVB 590). Similar configuration to Estonian craft. Furuno 7010D, I-band radar.
  - KBV 590, based in Luleå
  - KBV 592, based in Umeå
- Swedish Navy: 3 craft
  - 302
  - 303
  - 304
- United Kingdom: British Royal Marines: 4 craft LCAC(L).
  - C 21
  - C 22 (now on display at The Hovercraft Museum, Lee-on-the-Solent)
  - C 23
  - C 24

== Specifications ==
- Designer / Manufacturer: Griffon Hovercraft Ltd.
- Crew 3
- Dimensions
  - Length 11.7 metres
  - Width 5.9 metres
  - full load displacement 3.5 tons
- Propulsion
  - Motor: diesel engine
  - Power: 1 Deutz diesel engine 350 horsepower for lift and propulsion
  - Propellers: 1 three-bladed variable-pitch propeller
- Performance
  - Speed 35 knots (at sea state 3)
  - Range 450 miles at 35 knots
  - Military Lift:
- Weapons
  - 1 M2HB machine gun (not on Belgian craft)
- Radar
  - Navigation: Various; I-band

== In popular culture ==
- The use of Griffon Hoverwork 2000TD is central to the 2002 James Bond film, Die Another Day, where the rogue faction of the Korean People's Army led by Colonel Sun-Tan Moon acquired those via blood diamond trading.
