= Finnish Customs =

Finnish government agency

Finnish Customs Tulli/Tull

Agency overview
- Formed: February 12, 1812

Jurisdictional structure
- Operations jurisdiction: Finland
- Specialist jurisdiction: Customs, excise, gambling

Operational structure
- Headquarters: Helsinki
- Parent agency: Ministry of Finance

Website
- tulli.fi/en/frontpage

Finnish Customs (Finnish: Tulli, Swedish: Tull) is the customs service of the Republic of Finland. It is a government agency steered by the Ministry of Finance. The Finnish Customs is a part of the customs system of the European Union and has around 1,900 employees.

== History ==
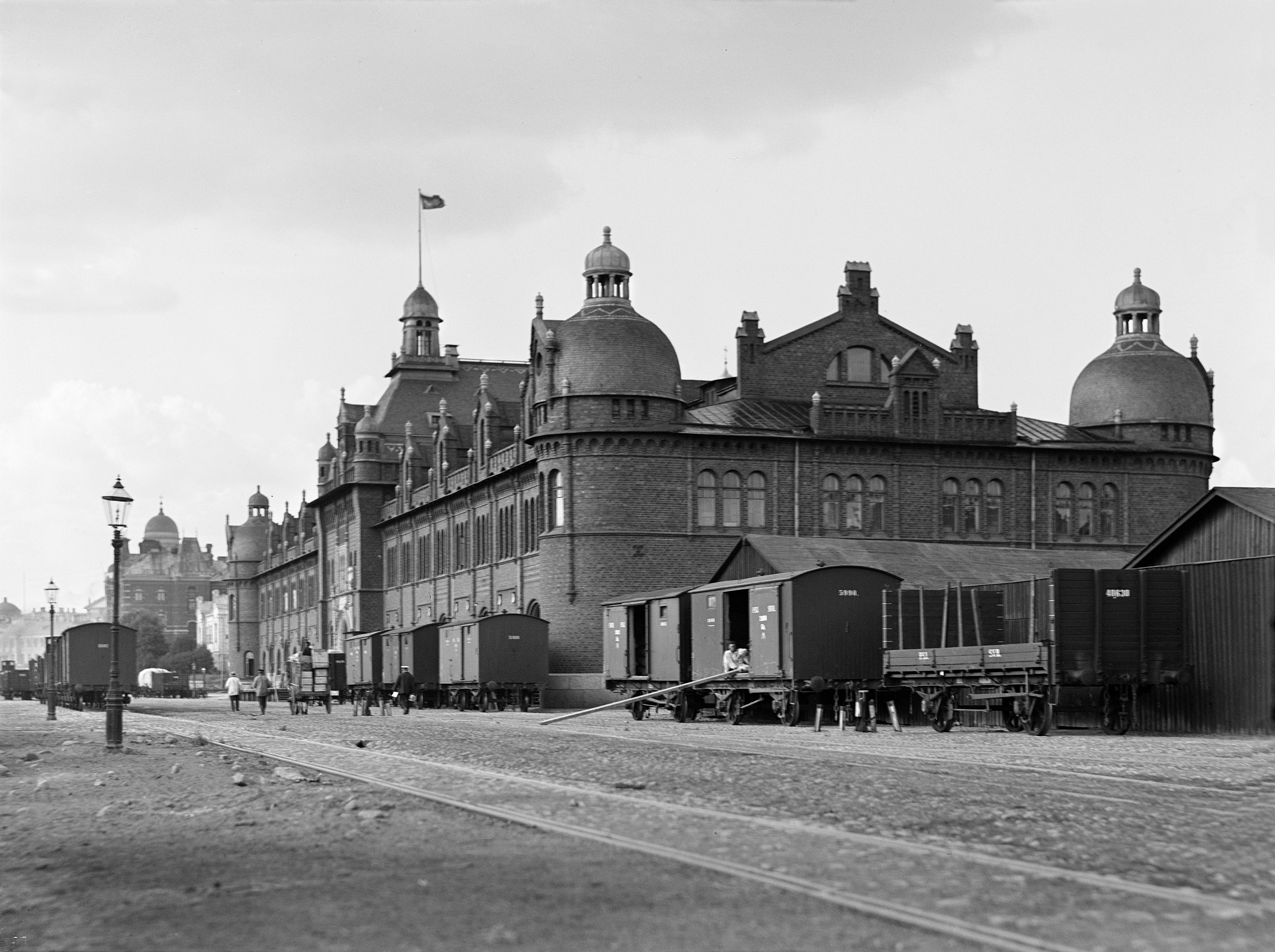
Customs warehouse building on Katajanokka in Helsinki, Finland (1908)

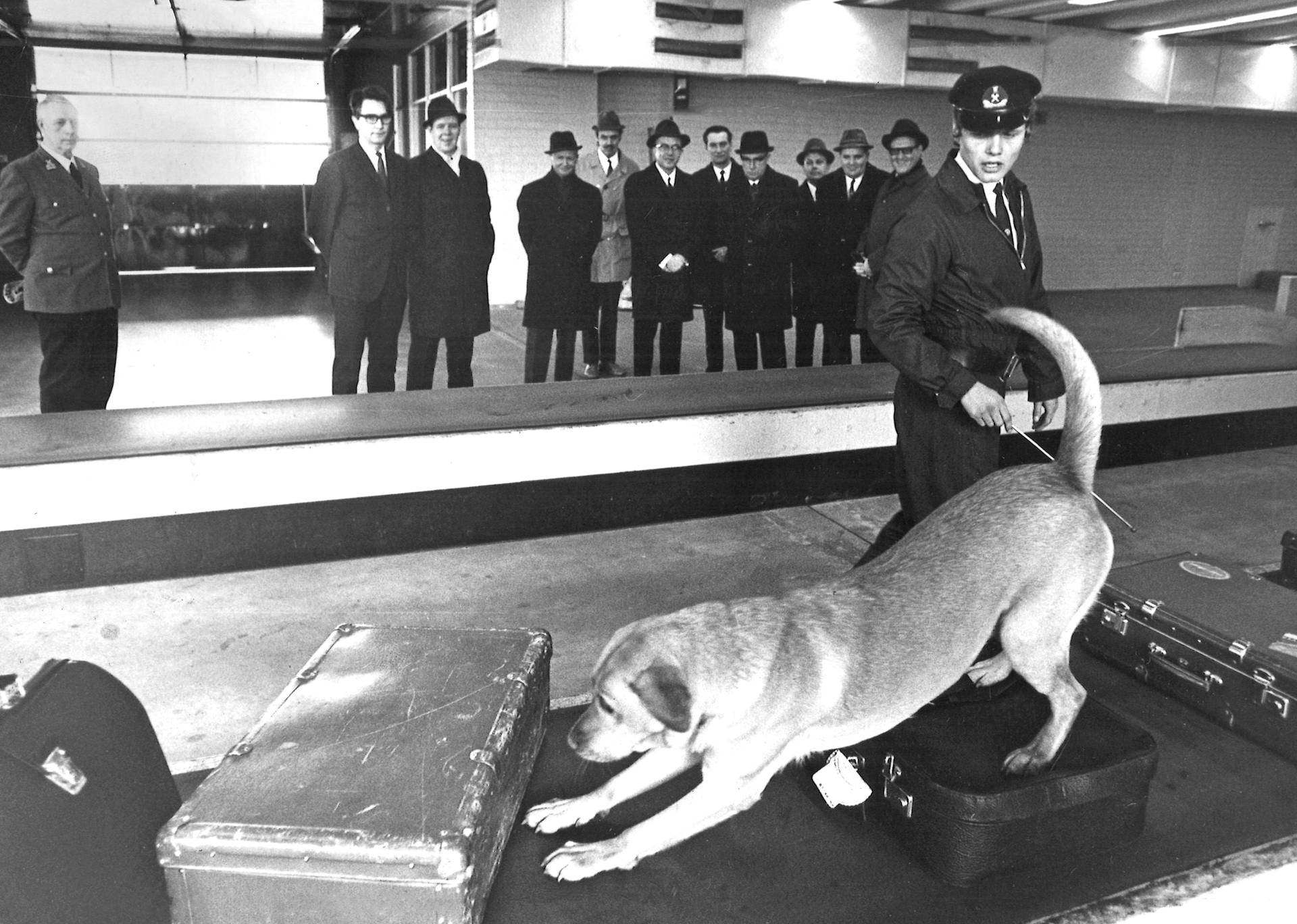
The Finnish Customs demonstrating drug detection with the dog Eka (1971)

On February 12, 1812, the founding of The General Customs Directorate of the Grand Duchy of Finland was approved by Alexander I of Russia as the Grand Duke of Finland. By the 1850s, customs duties' share of total tax revenue was over 40 percent. The directorate was renamed the Board of Customs in 1881. The customs service of the Grand Duchy of Finland was autonomous from the customs service of the Russian Empire, and thus the transition to the customs service of an independent Finland in 1917 was smooth.

Customs duties formed the backbone of the Finnish state economy until the 1930s, but the fiscal importance of duties has decreased drastically due to the international reduction or elimination of trade barriers since the 1950s. Finland joined the EU and its Customs Union in 1995, but this caused no significant challenges for Finnish Customs.

== Current activities ==
The tasks of Finnish Customs include the facilitation of the trade in goods, the protection of society and the environment, and the collection of customs duties, charges and taxes on import goods. It also compiles the official statistics on international trade.

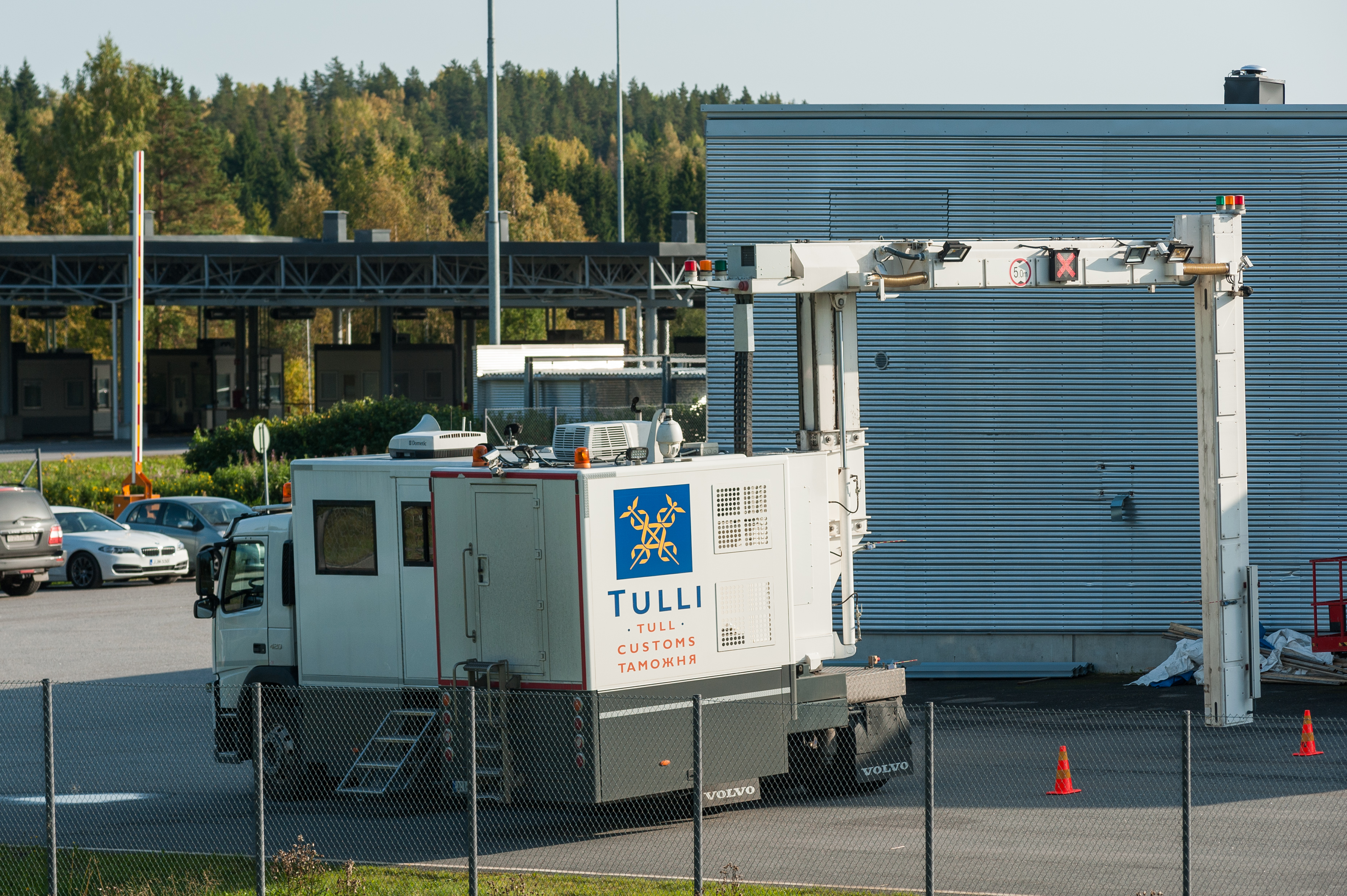
An X-ray scanner truck at the Nuijamaa border crossing

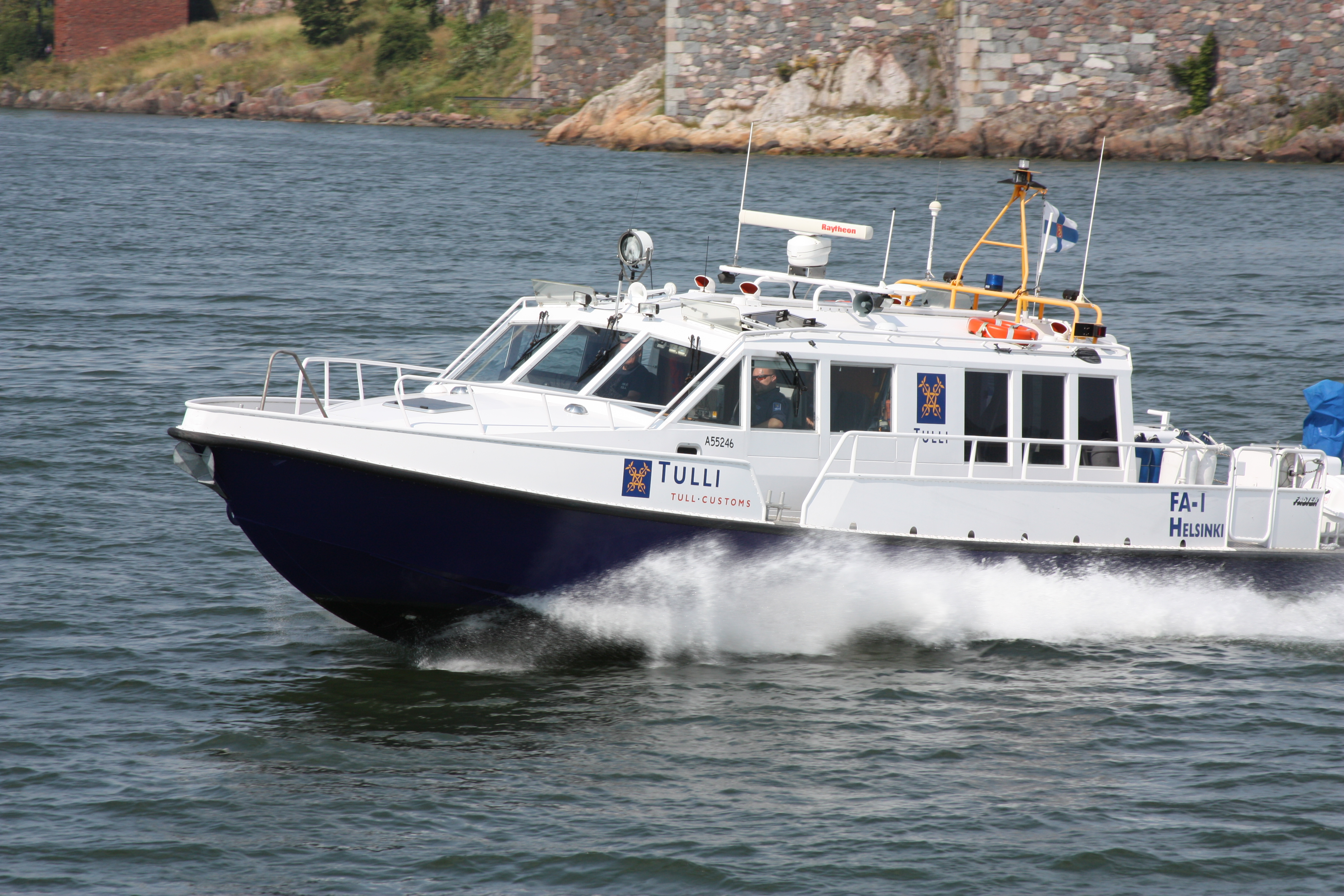
Finnish Customs patrol boat in Helsinki (2009)

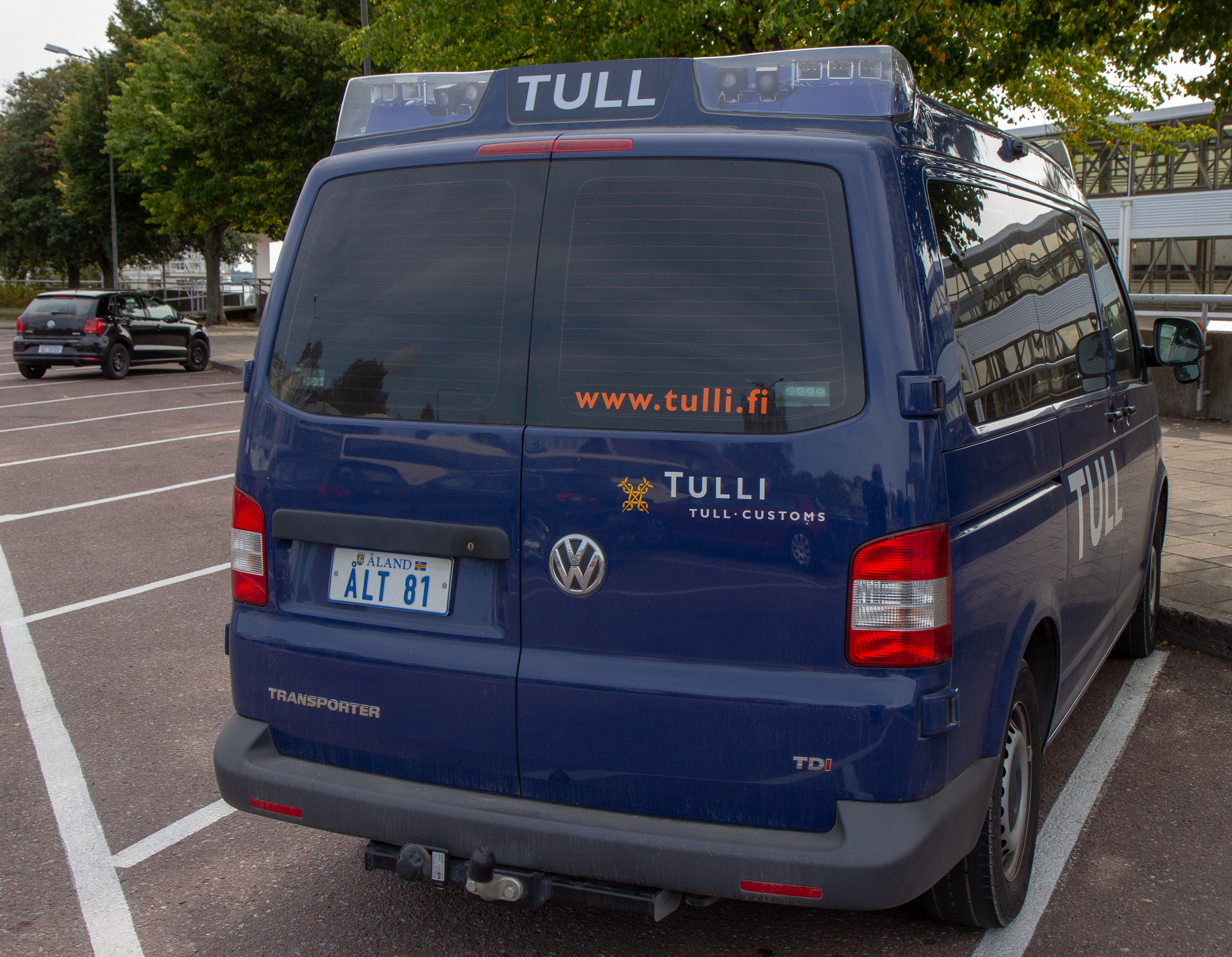
Volkswagen Transporter patrol unit of the Finnish Customs

== Directors ==
- Gustaf Hjärne 1812–1816
- Claes Jakob Gripenberg 1816–1822
- Jacob Snellman 1822–1828
- Julius Conrad Antell 1828–1831
- Christian Avellan 1831–1841
- Berndt Federley 1841–1847
- Carl Gustaf Enckell 1848–1849
- Frans Olof af Brunér 1849–1855
- Johan August von Born 1855–1865
- Konstantin Wikman 1865–1881
- Herman Peter Höckert 1881–1890
- Birger Fridolf Winter 1890–1901
- Bernhard Anton Harald Indrenius 1902–1903
- Knut Gustaf Nikolai Borgenström 1903–1905
- Eugraf Nyman 1905–1907
- T. J. Boisman 1907–1910
- Axel Fabian af Enehjelm 1910–1915
- Pavel Strauch 1915–1917
- Wilhelm Gabriel Poppius 1917–1935
- Ilmari Killinen 1936–1942
- Eljas Kahra 1942–1945
- Auno Halonen 1945–1951
- Nikolai Saarnio 1951–1968
- Jorma Uitto 1968–1988
- Jermu Laine 1988–1994
- Berndt Olof Johansson 1994–1998
- Tapani Erling 1998–2012
- Antti Hartikainen 2012-2013
- Leo Nissinen 2013–2015
- Antti Hartikainen 2015-2019
- Hannu Mäkinen 2019–2024
- Sami Rakshit 2024–Current

== See also ==
- Finnish Border Guard
