= Antti Rannanjärvi =

Finnish gangster (b.1828)

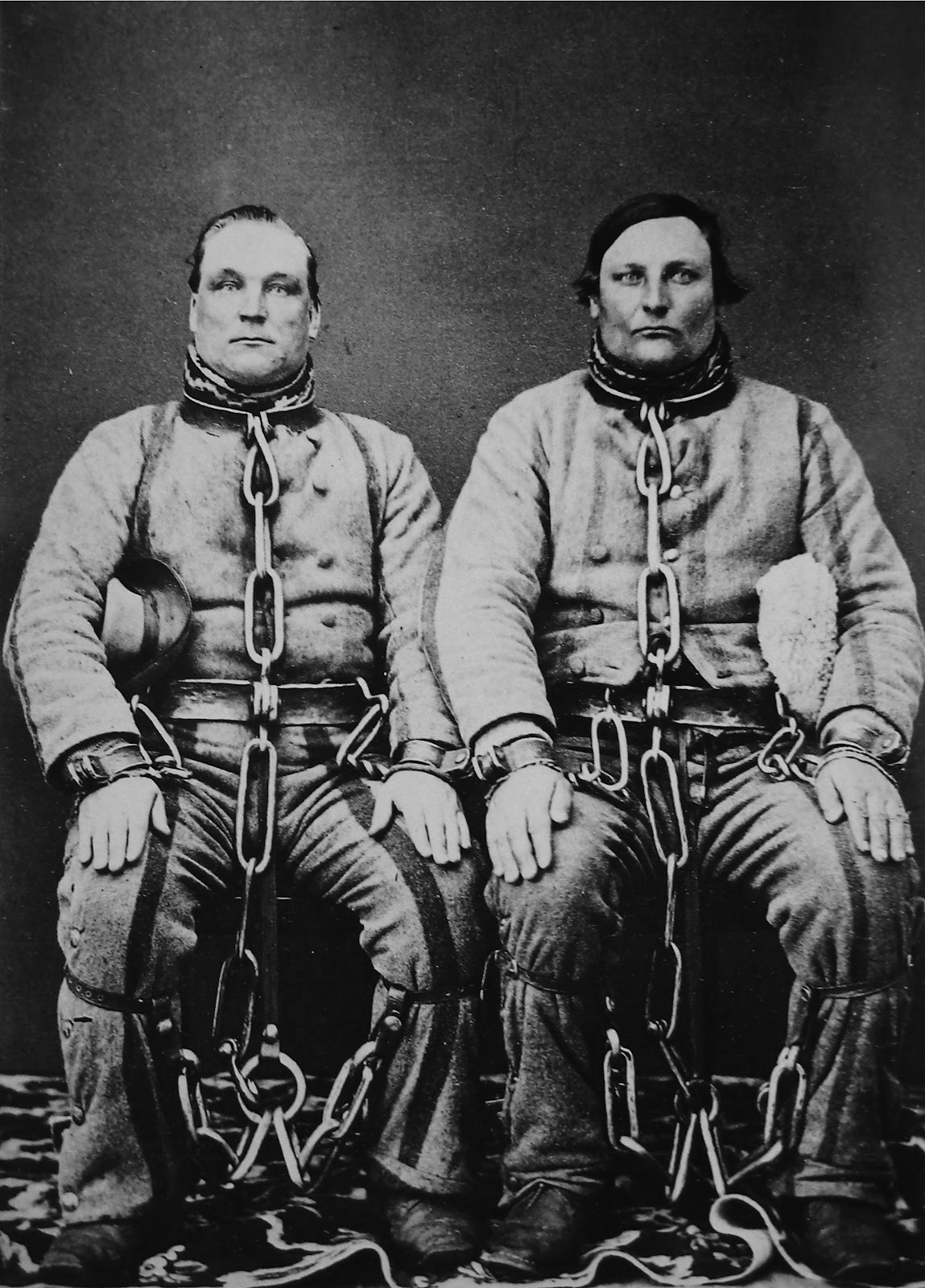
Antti Rannanjärvi and Antti Isotalo (1869).

Antti Rannanjärvi (born 4 April 1828, Ylihärmä – 12 August 1882, Ylihärmä) was a Finnish farmer and puukkojunkkari, who led a gang of criminals together with Antti Isotalo. Rannanjärvi continued to make trouble in the later part of his life but did not have to face the authorities. He was killed by Erkki Fränti, called "Prännin Erkki" by the locals.

Rannanjärvi is nowadays best remembered from the song Isontalon Antti ja Rannanjärvi.

== See also ==
- The Tough Ones
- Härmä
