= Business prohibition =

A business prohibition is a prohibition issued by a court that prohibits an individual from holding a position of responsibility in a corporation. Business prohibitions are given as punishments and as preemptive measures following aggravated offences while in office, such as false accounting, or gross neglect of duties. This may include being "Banned from being a director". The objective is to ascertain public trust in corporations: if the offender's actions are liable to damage the trust of debtors, partners or other parties of contracts, a business prohibition is issued.

An individual with a business prohibition may not found or run any sort of a corporation, be in a corporate executive board, be employed as a CEO or even use one's powers as a stock owner, even by proxy. If a proxy agrees to circumvent the prohibition, he may be convicted as an accessory to a crime.
