= Tapani Erling =

Finnish economist

Tapani Erling (born 22 May 1945), is a Finnish economist. He was the Director-General of Finnish Customs. In July 2006 he was elected chairman of the Council of the World Customs Organization.

Before being nominated to the head to the Finnish customs in 1998 he served as a manager in charge of foreign subsidiaries at Outokumpu Oy and before that at economist positions at different Finnish ministries. He has worked in the Finnish OECD representative office, and also pursued an academic career.

Erling has been a member of the Social Democratic Party of Finland. He served as the political secretary of minister for foreign trade, Jermu Laine from 1973 to 1978.

Erling is married and has at least one son, Orri, who was known as a child prodigy who started his career in the Finnish software industry at the age of fifteen.

Erling is known as a promoter of French-Finnish co-operation and has been made a Chevalier of the Légion d'honneur.
