= Once Upon a Time in the North (film) =

- Theatrical poster
- Finnish: Härmä
- Directed by: JP Siili
- Written by: JP Siili
- Produced by: Olli Haikka; Jarkko Hentula
- Starring: Mikko Leppilampi; Lauri Tilkanen; Pamela Tola; Esko Salminen
- Cinematography: Jani Kumpulainen
- Edited by: Aleksi Raij
- Music by: Tuomas Kantelinen
- Production companies: Yellow Film & TV
- Distributed by: Finnkino Oy
- Release date: 17 February 2012
- Running time: 148 minutes
- Country: Finland
- Language: Finnish

Once Upon a Time in the North (Finnish: Härmä) is a 2012 Finnish film written and directed by JP Siili. The film is about puukkojunkkaris, troublemakers who were active in the Southern Ostrobothnia region of Finland in the 19th century.

== Cast ==
- Lauri Tilkanen as Matti
- Mikko Leppilampi as Esko
- Pamela Tola as Aino
- Aku Hirviniemi as Kalle
- Eero Milonoff as Koskela
- Esko Salminen as Antti Välitalo
- Lena Meriläinen as Maria Välitalo
- Taneli Mäkeläas Sakari Kantola
- Olavi Uusivirta as Lehto
- Pirkka-Pekka Petelius as Notary
- Kari Hietalahti as Sheriff
