= Antti Isotalo =

Finnish gangster

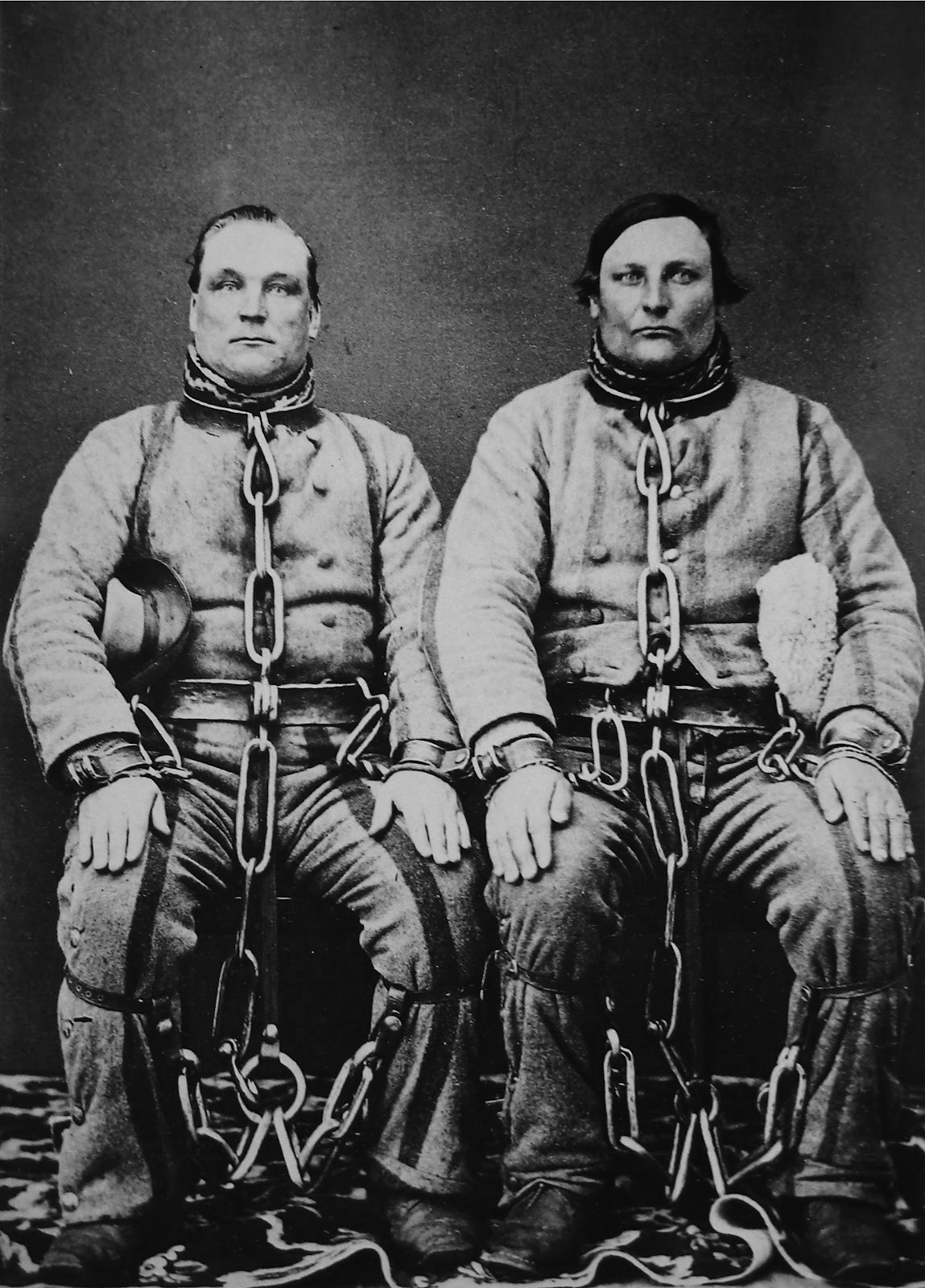
Antti Rannanjärvi and Antti Isotalo (1869)

Antti Isotalo (30 August 1831, Hanhimäki, Alahärmä – 8 August 1911, Alahärmä), also known as Isoo-Antti, Isoon talo(o)n Antti or Isontalon Antti, was a Finnish farmer and puukkojunkkari, who led the criminal gang Isoo-joukko (literally, 'Iso[talo]'s Bunch') together with Antti Rannanjärvi from 1856 to 1867.

Isotalo was a restless character, and his hobbies included horse racing. He was a shrewd businessman, and felt right at home at the town market. He seldom had to gather people around himself, instead people were reported to gather around him on their own initiative. He was a fearless and ruthless fighter. Because of his large size, he was often asked to act as a security guard in festivities.

Isotalo was accused of homicide in 1858, but was released due to lack of conclusive evidence. Based on new witness statements, the court sentenced him to death in 1869. The Senate of Finland changed the sentence to 12 years of hard labour at the Hämeenlinna correctional facility. Isotalo is reported to have denied his guilt for the rest of his life. In prison he behaved well. Isotalo was married three times.

== In court ==
- 1855: Proved guilty of assault with a knife.
- 1856: Sentenced to fines for illegal sale of moonshine and disobeying Sabbath.
- 1858: Released of charges of having stabbed Matti Tönkä, sentenced to fines for openly carrying a knife without reason.
- 1862: Sentenced to 38 lashes of a whip and public church penalty for pickpocketing.
- 1864: Accused of illegal distillery of moonshine.
- 1869: Sentenced for appearing in court drunk, openly displaying his knife, burglary, theft and arson.
- 1869: Because of new witness reports, sentenced to the death penalty for the homicide in 1858. Appealed to the Senate in 1870 and received pardon, but sentenced to fines, whipping, loss of honour and hard labour for 12 years.
- 1882: Released from prison.
- 1883: Assaulted a man but only sentenced to fines.

== See also ==
- Antti Isotalo (Jäger)
- The Tough Ones
- Härmä

== Sources ==
- Tourism directory for Ostrobothnia: Personal history: Isotalo Antti
