= Puukkojunkkari =

Troublemakers in Finland in the 19th century

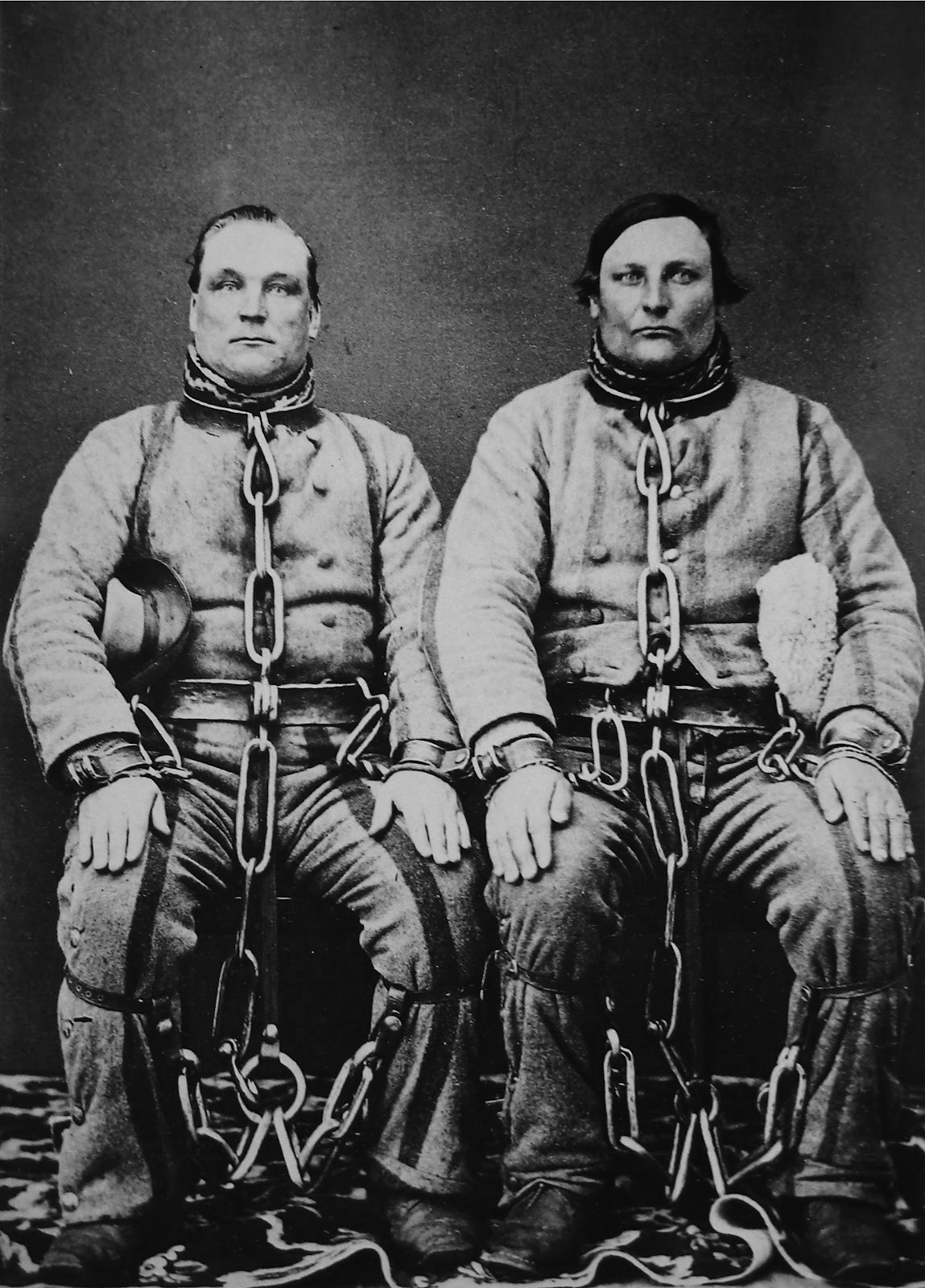
Antti Rannanjärvi and Antti Isotalo were famous puukkojunkkaris.

Puukkojunkkari (Swedish: knivjunkare, translated to English as knife-fighter; lit. 'knife junker') or häjy (lit. 'mean, wicked') was a term used of troublemakers who were active in the Southern Ostrobothnia region of Finland in the 19th century. Fights among puukkojunkkaris were common, and often resulted in death. Puukkojunkkaris usually made trouble at weddings, stole horses and roamed the towns and villages. They also participated in gambling and theft. The most notorious puukkojunkkaris lived in towns near the Lapuanjoki river, such as Alahärmä. The first homicides took place in the 1790s, but the infamous "golden age" of puukkojunkkaris lasted from the 1820s to the 1880s.

== The puukkojunkkaris as a social phenomenon ==
Puukkojunkkaris were present in all classes of society. They included both free houseowners and farmhands. The houseowners were often the gangs' leaders. Puukkojunkkaris were often feared and respected, and they fought for their honour. Their code of honour forbade fear and respected fighting. Puukkojunkkaris were often difficult to prosecute because few people dared testify against them. Puukkojunkkaris also received admiration and respect because they dared to stand up against society and authorities.

Many attempts have been made to explain the rise of puukkojunkkaris. In the 19th century, the living standards in Ostrobothnia rose, and because of this, weddings became grandiose events with plenty of alcohol being consumed. Young men in Ostrobothnia did not often get a chance to inherit their own farm and earn their own wealth, which led to frustration among youth.

== Theory of young men's rebellion ==
Reino Kallio's theory of knife-fighters is based on the idea of the phenomenon having been a counter-reaction caused by social control that had gone too far. He sees the violent behaviour of Ostrobothnia's youth as a protest-like rebellion against the pressure exercised by the power structures of its society; particularly against local laws and strict parish discipline on behalf of the church. The resistance that started as little more than mild mischief, became branded as a phenomenon, and this stigmatisation of the youth as troublemakers led to a path towards more serious crimes. This was particularly due to the fact that parish discipline, which was stricter than Finnish law, lowered the threshold of crime. At the time, there were many new ways for youngsters to spend their free time, such as wandering around outdoors at night, which was considered a breach against the parish curfew and thus, a threat to the existence of class society. Therefore, district courts started punishing people for breaking curfew at night – as well as for other crimes against parish discipline.

The fundamentalist church and the religious revivalist movements of the 18th and 19th centuries, such as pietism, also took a negative view of young people's leisure activities, due to "moral reasons". This led to competition between different religious groups, first leading to tighter church discipline and then to tighter parish discipline. The situation was brought to a head by a labour shortage that brought more tension to the working conditions, while the rich, house-owning population competed with each other, building baronial, 1.5 to 2-storey-high residential buildings. By invoking general regulations, masters could avoid disciplinary conflicts with their children or hirelings whenever there was a labour shortage. Furthermore, increased drinking caused both private and public problems.

The disciplinary regulations (that were normally confirmed by the local governor) limited and regulated, in great detail, the already scarce free time that youngsters had: in addition to curfew at night, there were regulations limiting dances, the publication of the bans of marriage and weddings, gatecrashing, moving, gathering, the use of spirits, cardplaying as well as general noisemaking and loitering. Because the young age groups usually took care of the heaviest physical work, fines were introduced in the 19th century to prevent days off. In Lapua, Laihia and Korsholm, not only farmhands, but also house-owners and crofters were banned from having free days.

At worst, parish discipline even led to group criminalisation of young people, as was the case in Kauhava and Vähäkyrö in the 1770s and 1780s, in Vörå in the 1820s and 1830s, and later, in the greater parishes of Laihia and Lapua. Parish discipline was exercised via group punishments, and cases were only taken to court in certain parishes in southern Ostrobothnia, not elsewhere in Finland – except for a few possible exceptions. All in all, the phenomenon took place against the background of a long-term crisis caused by radical socio-economic changes, which triggered youth violence due to the parish discipline managed and maintained by the authorities. Finally, the culture of violence began feeding itself.

The model that Kallio first used for his thesis in 1982 has also been called "the youth rebellion theory". Its main sources include court minutes and document material from local archives. The theory approaches the stigmatisation theory that the sociologist, Anthony Giddens, considers to be one of the most important criminal theories. According to this theory, criminal behaviour is not a characteristic of an individual or a group, but rather an interactive process between criminals and non-criminals. The theory is based on the concept that no deed is criminal in itself, but the definition of crime constitutes a part of the exercise of power. An individual stigmatised as a criminal is discriminated against by authorities, which supports one's criminal behaviour and displacement from the mainstream population. A similar view can indirectly be seen in the drama Pohjalaisia (Ostrobothnians).

== Execution of parish laws and regulations ==
In the central parishes of both Finnish and Swedish-speaking southern Ostrobothnia, those who defended parish laws and regulations sought to exert their power over the young working population, particularly over the children of house-owners, crofters and independent workers, as well as soldiers and servants. During the last three decades of Swedish reign (which ended in 1721), hundreds of them were fined for violations against parish discipline, thus making the puukkojunkkari phenomenon the first known large-scale youth problem in Finnish history.

On the local level, order was maintained by the masters of the greatest houses and, as their trustees, mainly village aldermen and lay members of the courts. Their duty was to inform authorities of any violations against rules. Aldermen were sometimes even fined for neglecting their peacekeeping duties. Many rural police chiefs also sought to catch anyone guilty of "disorderly conduct", and took them to court. In the worst cases of public disorder, rural police chiefs had to call upon the Russian armed forces, i.e. Cossacks, for help – one of them was killed at a wedding in Lapua in 1862. Maintenance of public order, and repeated criminalisation afterwards, led to the junkkaris' displacement from the community. As a result, some of them considered themselves criminals, acted accordingly and even boasted of their "heroic deeds", which sometimes targeted rural police chiefs, priests and trustees. Santeri Alkio describes disturbances targeting the lattee in his novel Puukkojunkkarit (Knife-fighters).

== Notable puukkojunkkaris ==
- Antti Rannanjärvi
- Antti Isotalo
- Jaakko Jaakonpoika Hautamäki
- Jaakko Pukkila
- Juha Huhtamäki
- Juha Antinpoika Leskenantti
- Jukka Rannanjärvi
- Kaapo Sivula
- Tuomas Tuomaanpoika Lööpäri
- Matti Haapoja

== Bibliography ==
- Kallio, Reino, Häiriköintiä ja henkirikoksia. Eteläpohjalaisnuoret paikallisen kurinpidon kohteena sääty-yhteiskunnan aikana. Helsinki 2009. ISBN 978-952-92-5261-9.
- Kallio, Reino, Pohjanmaan suomenkielisten kylien oltermannihallinto. Tutkimus vuoden 1742 kyläjärjestysohjeen toteuttamisesta. Jyväskylä 1982. Jyväskylän yliopisto. Summary. ISBN 951-678-680-4.
- Paulaharju, Samuli: Härmän aukeilta. WSOY, 1947. ISBN 951-0-20917-1.
- Pietiläinen, Timo: Kauhavan historia 1. Kivikaudesta kaupungintaloon. Kauhavan kaupunki, 1999. ISBN 951-98051-1-7.
- Rajala, Juha, Kurittajia ja puukkosankareita. Väkivalta ja sen kontrollointi Kannaksen rajaseudulla 1885–1917. Helsinki 2004.SKS.
- Ylikangas, Heikki: Puukkojunkkareitten esiinmarssi. Väkivaltarikollisuus Etelä-Pohjanmaalla 1790–1825. Otava, Helsinki 1976.

== See also ==
- The Tough Ones (Häjyt), a 1999 film about puukkojunkkaris
- Härmä (film), a 2012 film about puukkojunkkaris
