= Copycat crime =

Criminal act that is inspired by a previous crime

A copycat crime is a criminal act that is modeled after or inspired by a previous crime. Perpetrators typically carry out copycat crimes after exposure to media coverage of the original crime, or having witnessed the crime itself.

According to studies, copycat crime is a social phenomenon that persists and is prevalent enough to have an impact on the whole criminal landscape, primarily by influencing criminal tactics as opposed to criminal motive or the emergence of criminal traits.

== Copycat effect ==
The copycat effect is the alleged tendency of sensational publicity about violent murders or suicides to result in more of the same through imitation.

The term was first coined in the early 20th century, following crimes inspired by Jack the Ripper. Due to the increase of replicated crimes, criminologists soon began to believe that media coverage played a role in inspiring other criminals to commit crimes in a similar fashion, and even for non-criminals to begin committing crimes when they otherwise might not have done so.

A 2004 book written by Loren Coleman called The Copycat Effect describes the effect that the media has on crimes and suicides, which are inspired by crimes that have been widely covered across the media. Coleman's view on the media is that the constant coverage of these events, rather than the events with a positive message, gives these criminals a type of fame. The five minutes of fame, book or movie that is dedicated to these criminals provokes other individuals with a tendency to behave in a similar way. Due to this type of fame, the "copycat effect" takes place.

The US documentary television series CopyCat Killers (2016–20) investigates murders that appear to be based on Hollywood films.

== Causes ==
People who mimic crimes seen in the media (especially in news and violent movies) are more likely to have prior criminal records, severe mental health problems, or histories of violence. This suggests that the effect of the media is indirect (more affecting criminal behavior) rather than direct (directly affecting the number of criminals). However, that indirect influence that the media has on the individual could possibly give them an idea of how to commit a crime. The type of reaction that the media coverage gives crimes can determine the path another criminal might take. This is because most copycat criminals are intent on the shock value of their actions. They commonly want to do something that will cause a high media coverage because of the attention that they will get, as well as the horror a crime may create. For example, if going on a shooting rampage in a public space causes this attention (because of previous incidents), then an individual with the tendency to commit the crime will more likely take that path.

The norms, heroes, anti-heroes and the spectacles of the time and place also influence how a crime is committed. One modern example might include dressing as a villain and going to a public place armed; occasionally, individuals replicate their favorite movie or TV show scene. Conversely, before modern media, such crimes might be associated with religious beliefs or phenomena in the natural environment. In both scenarios, it is the public interest that sparks what crime might be committed.

Some researchers hold the view that the interaction between violent media content and the emotional development of an individual play a role in copycat behaviors. Individuals who are less emotionally developed will more likely commit the crimes that they see on TV. Characteristics such as demographic (age and sex), criminal factors (mental/personality disorders, failure in human bonding/lack of identity, social isolation and alienation) and relationship to media (trust in media, media literacy, identification with the perpetrators seen in media), mixed with media characteristics and cultural-environmental factors influences the copycat behavior in individuals. Media characteristics include the blur between fantasy and reality, positive response to violence and crime, and how the crime is being committed. Cultural-environmental factors include the cultural view of fame and crime, reliance to the media for information, and moral panics. Offenders most likely to be influenced by these characteristics are usually under the age of 25. However, these claims are an object of an ongoing debate in research on the effects of violence in mass media.

Apart from these, the findings of another study showed that instead of a first-time violent offender, a copycat offender is more inclined to be a professional criminal who commits property-related offences. Since the social background aspects affecting copycat crimes have not been established, it is still uncertain how exactly media coverage and the behaviour of copycat crimes are related.

== Prevention ==
American writer and cryptozoologist Loren Coleman and author Zeynep Tufekci have suggested that copycat crimes can be prevented through a number of means, including: the use of carefully selected, non-sensationalistic language on the part of law enforcement and the media when communicating news of crimes to the public; avoiding the release of details on both the methods of crimes and the name of any suspects; avoiding the perpetuation of cliches and stereotypes about criminals and the causes of their behavior; emphasis on the effect of the crimes on the victims and their loved ones; and including protective factors like helplines when publishing stories on such crimes.

== Examples ==
Various criminal acts have been inspired by many television shows, movies, books as well as other criminals. A list of a few crimes that have been a result of the copycat effect are:

=== Television series ===
==== Breaking Bad ====
The television show Breaking Bad has been suspected of inspiring a number of crimes. The series depicts Walter White, a high school chemistry teacher with cancer who begins making and selling drugs to obtain money for securing his family's financial future. Some of the most notable include the following:

- Blue colored methamphetamine, seemingly inspired by Walter White's meth, has been found by law enforcement across the United States; the first reports of such meth was in Kansas City, Missouri in 2010, while by 2014, it had reached New Mexico, the show’s main setting.
- In 2013, a 27-year-old man in Nine Mile Falls, Washington, Jason Hart, was found guilty of strangling his girlfriend to death, and then used sulfuric acid in a plastic tub to dispose of the body. The incident had many similarities to various scenes in Breaking Bad, where Walter and Jesse Pinkman dispose of bodies in a similar fashion. It was later found out that he had been a fan of Breaking Bad.
- Stephen W. Doran, teacher and former member of the Massachusetts House of Representatives from 1981 to 1995, who was suffering from cancer, was arrested in 2013 for methamphetamine trafficking when police found $10,000 in cash, as well as equipment.
- In 2015, a 31-year-old Liverpool man, Mohammed Ali, was sentenced to eight years in prison after trying to buy 500 mg of ricin, a toxin which plays a major part in the show's plot, on a darknet market. In his testimony, he stated he was merely curious as to what he could buy off the dark web and as "[he] had been watching Breaking Bad, [he] just had ricin in [his] mind."

==== Dexter ====
In Canada, Mark Twitchell was arrested in 2008 for the attempted murder of one man and the successful murder of another. He was convicted of the latter crime only in 2011, but he documented his efforts to become a serial killer and is a fan of the television show Dexter.

==== Monsters: The Lyle and Erik Menendez Story ====
On March 4, 2025, 15-year-old Reed R. Gelinskey was arrested and subsequently charged with first-degree intentional homicide for the death of his mother in Caledonia, Wisconsin. Gelinskey stated that he developed the plan to kill his parents after watching the "shotgun scene" (Note: Mistakenly referred to by sources as the documentary film The Menendez Brothers, which also came out on Netflix in 2024; the documentary does not contain any "shotgun scene".) from the Netflix limited series Monsters: The Lyle and Erik Menendez Story.

=== Films ===
- Scream: A 24-year-old man, Thierry Jaradin, stabbed a young girl, Alisson Cambier, 30 times; similar to the way the victim was stabbed in the movie. He had been wearing the Ghostface costume, and later confessed that he had planned the murder in a similar way to the movie. On September 22, 2006, Cassie Jo Stoddart, a high school student, was murdered by her classmates Brian Draper and Torey Adamcik in her aunt and uncle's house in Pocatello, Idaho, United States. The perpetrators claimed that they were inspired to murder Stoddart by Scream, which led to them being nicknamed "The Scream Killers". Adamcik and Draper recorded documentary-style videos about how they were horror movie fans, especially Scream, and wanted to reenact a similar murder in real life.
- Fight Club: There have been many incidents inspired by the movie. One of the incidents occurred in 2009 during the Memorial Day weekend in New York City. Bombs were set off in various locations supposedly representing their oppression. Kyle Shaw was found guilty, and was himself a member of a local fight club.
- Saw: In Salt Lake City two teenage boys were turned in after being overheard planning the kidnapping, torture, and murder of several individuals who in their estimation needed to be taught a lesson. The pair had set up cameras so as to record their killings. In Tennessee, two girls were charged with phone harassment after leaving a 52-year-old woman a voicemail stating they had taken possession of her friend, were about to release a toxic gas, and the voicemail recipient had to choose between risking her own life to save her friend's or letting her friend die.
- The Dark Knight: The movie's depiction of the Joker has inspired several crimes. In 2010, a Wisconsin man assaulted his cousin and girlfriend, dressed as the Joker, when he found them sleeping together. In 2009, a young girl attacked her teacher with a razor blade. Her face had been painted in a similar way to the Joker. The 2012 Aurora, Colorado, shooting, which took place during a screening of the film's sequel, is often mistaken for a Joker copycat crime due to misinformation in early reporting.
- Taxi Driver: The 1976 film inspired John Hinckley Jr.'s attempt to assassinate Ronald Reagan in 1981. The main character in the film comes close to assassinating a presidential candidate, and Hinckley was driven by an intense obsession with Jodie Foster, who was part of the film's cast.
- Several movies, including Basic Instinct, American Psycho, Casablanca and Catch Me If You Can, inspired Luka Magnotta to commit the 2012 murder of Concordia University student Jun Lin. Magnotta recorded the murder of the student whom he had recently met on Craigslist and also posted the video online. On the video, New Order's "True Faith" can be heard playing in the background, which can also be heard in American Psycho. Jun Lin was stabbed multiple times while being tied up on the bed, in the same way that Johnny Boz was tied up on Basic Instinct's main character Catherine's bed. One item Magnotta used to murder Jun Lin was a screwdriver, which was painted white to make it look like the ice pick Catherine used to kill Johnny Boz. Above the bed, Magnotta carefully hung a poster of the movie Casablanca, which he threw away after the murder. After the murder, Magnotta fled to Paris (which is also an important location in Casablanca), claiming that an individual named Manny forced him first to kill cats and then Jun Lin; Manny was the name of Catherine's fiancé in Basic Instinct. In 2014 Magnotta was captured in Berlin and flown back to Canada. While in Europe, Magnotta used a false passport in the name of Kirk Trammel, which is another reference to the main character in Basic Instinct, Catherine Trammel. On the footage of the interrogation, Magnotta sits cross-legged while smoking a cigarette to complete his homage to Basic Instinct. Around 2010, when Magnotta first started uploading videos online of him killing kittens, he used different aliases and accounts. On one account, he posted the movie Catch Me If You Can, in which Leonardo DiCaprio is on the run from the FBI.
- KGF: Chapter 2: Spree killer Shivprasad Dhurve, who bludgeoned three security guards to death in Sagar and Bhopal, Madhya Pradesh, claimed after his arrest that he was inspired by the character Rocky Bhai and because he "wanted to be famous".

=== Criminals ===
- Asghar the Murderer: Hoshang Amini, who murdered a total of 67 people in Varamin from 1954 to 1962, said in interviews after his arrest that he was inspired by Asghar's murder spree. Like Asghar, Amini also predominantly targeted young boys.
- Zodiac Killer: In the late 1960s, near San Francisco, an unidentified man murdered at least five victims and wounded two more, also sending taunting letters and codes to the media. Twenty years later Eddie Seda attacked victims in a similar manner in New York City, killing his victims with a homemade gun. He left similar notes at the scene of the crime, and also sent cryptic letters to the police. Unlike the Zodiac Killer, Seda was eventually caught because of the fingerprints that he had left behind on the notes. Seito Sakakibara, the perpetrator of the Kobe child murders used the symbol of The Zodiac Killer as his signature. He was nicknamed the "Japanese Zodiac Killer". Serial killer Edward Edwards killed couples in lover's lanes as allusions to the Zodiac; author John Cameron suggested that Edwards himself was the Zodiac.
- Gerald and Charlene Gallego: From 1978 to 1980, the married couple murdered ten victims across three states in a series of crimes dubbed the "Sex Slave murders". Over a decade later, from 1996 to 1997, another couple, James Daveggio and Michelle Michaud, committed a series of rapes and one murder in similar fashion to the Gallegos. They had even purchased the couple's trading cards in a serial killer-themed deck as well as the book The Sex Slave Murders, which detailed crimes committed by the Gallegos.
- September 11 attacks: On January 5, 2002, four months after 9/11, 15-year-old Charles Bishop, heavily inspired by the 9/11 attacks, committed the 2002 Tampa Cessna 172 crash, in which he stole a small Cessna plane and purposely crashed it into the side of the Bank of America Tower in Tampa, Florida. In his suicide note, Bishop showed support for Osama Bin Laden. Bishop was killed in the crash; there were no other injuries, and only minor damage to the building.
- Sri Lanka Easter bombings: In 2019, Islamic State supporter Safiyya Amira Shaikh plotted a suicide bombing campaign in London. Heavily inspired by the attacks on Sri Lankan churches and hotels that killed 269 people, Shaikh explicitly chose to execute her plan during a major Christian holiday, initially targeting Christmas before shifting to Easter to ensure St Paul's Cathedral would be at its busiest. Her plan involved leaving an explosive device in a bag under the cathedral's dome, planting a second bomb at a nearby hotel, and subsequently detonating a suicide vest on the London Underground. The operation resulted in no casualties, as the plot was entirely thwarted by undercover counter-terrorism officers before any explosives could be built.
- October 7 attacks: Various incidents and attacks have been inspired by the October 7 attacks. For example, the perpetrator of the 2023 Arras school stabbing cited the October 7 attacks as partial inspiration in a video recorded before his attack.
- Hinman murder: Contemporary interviews and trial witness testimony insisted that the Tate–LaBianca murders were copycat crimes of the Murder of Gary Hinman intended to exonerate Charles Manson's friend Bobby Beausoleil.
- The Dnepropetrovsk maniacs: On 5 April 2011, two Russian youths, Artyom Anoufriev and Nikita Lytkin, known as the Academy maniacs were arrested in connection with six murders and attacks on residents in Akademgorodok in Irkutsk. The attacks, which involved a mallet and knife, began in December 2010. Both were arrested after a video recording showing a female body being mutilated with a knife was found on a camera belonging to Lytkin's uncle, who had become suspicious. According to media reports, the youths were influenced by reading about the Dnepropetrovsk maniacs on the Internet. A psychiatric examination found them sane, and they told doctors they chose weak people as their victims. On 2 April 2013, Anoufriev was sentenced to life imprisonment and Lytkin to 24 years in prison.
- Jack the Ripper: The Almería Ripper, an unidentified Spanish serial killer who murdered between five and at least ten prostitutes in Almería between 1989 and 1995, is thought to have been influenced by Jack. In 2008, Derek Brown, 48, was found guilty of killing two young women in a similar way as the Ripper. He had targeted the two women, one a prostitute and the other a street vendor, because he believed that the two would not have been noticed missing. The two bodies were never found, but it is said that he may have dismembered the women in his bathtub and later disposed of the bodies.
- Andrei Chikatilo: Vladimir Mukhankin, himself a serial killer who killed, tortured and dismembered nine people in the Rostov Oblast, once called himself "Chikatilo's student".
- Chicago Tylenol murders: In 1982, seven people had died after taking the over-the-counter Tylenol after it had been laced with cyanide. Deaths in a similar fashion occurred a few years later. A woman was found dead after she had taken two Tylenol pills which had also been laced with cyanide. In case, Stella Nickell was found guilty of tampering with Excedrin, which caused the death of two individuals, including her husband.
- Jeffrey Dahmer: On June 18, 2020, Chance Seneca, 21, of Lafayette, Louisiana, kidnapped a young man named Holden White and attempted to murder him to satisfy his homicidal urges. White survived after remaining three days in a coma. Seneca attempted to kidnap another man in the meantime. When he was arrested, Seneca confessed to deeply obsessive thoughts about Jeffrey Dahmer, whom he idolized. Court records showed that his obsession was so severe as to name a pet bunny "Jeffrey Dahmer" and use Dahmer's photo in his Facebook profile, additionally writing in a school essay that if he could be any person in history, he would choose to be Jeffrey Dahmer. Seneca also said that he wanted Dahmer tattooed on his body. He used Grindr to lure the men while denying homophobic reasons and saying that he is gay himself. Seneca also tried to argue that his crime was not a hate crime because he is gay and that it constituted "intragroup" violence, emphasizing that being gay, he could not have committed a hate crime on a gay man. The court ultimately rejected this argument, and on January 25, 2023, he was sentenced to 45 years in prison in federal prison after being convicted on charges related to attempted murder, kidnapping, and scheming a plan of kidnapping and murder.
- Dunblane massacre: On March 13, 1996, Thomas Hamilton, 43, killed 16 children and one teacher at Dunblane Primary School before committing suicide. On April 28 of that same year, Martin Bryant committed another mass shooting at Port Arthur in Tasmania, killing 35 people and injuring 23 before his arrest. According to his lawyer, Bryant was motivated in large part by media coverage of the Dunblane shooting, particularly the attention given to the perpetrator.
- 2016 shooting of Dallas police officers: On July 7, 2016, Micah Xavier Johnson, a 25-year-old military veteran, ambushed and killed five police officers and wounded nine others before being killed by a robot-delivered bomb. Heavily inspired by this attack and the widespread media coverage it received, Gavin Eugene Long, a 29-year-old Marine Corps veteran, launched an ambush of his own just ten days later on July 17, targeting law enforcement officers in Baton Rouge, Louisiana. Long, armed with an IWI Tavor SAR rifle, killed three officers and wounding three others before being killed by a SWAT marksman. Prior to the shooting, Long had posted online videos and a manifesto under an alias explicitly praising Johnson's actions in Dallas, declaring that "justice" had been served and framing Johnson's ambush as a morally justified form of tactical retaliation against law enforcement.
- Timothy McVeigh: the Oklahoma City bombing was intended to be emulated by a teen militia, the Lords of Chaos, in a firebombing arson at a Coca-Cola factory. the Oklahoma City bombing was also the inspiration for the Columbine shooting, which was intended to be a bombing.
- Jokela High School massacre: The Kauhajoki school shooting occurred on 23 September 2008, at Seinäjoki University of Applied Sciences in Kauhajoki, a town in the former province of Western Finland. The gunman, 22-year-old culinary arts student Matti Juhani Saari, shot and fatally injured ten people with a semi-automatic pistol, before shooting himself in the head. He died a few hours later in Tampere University Hospital, Saari was heavily inspired by Pekka Eric Auvinen the gunman behind the Jokela shooting, Saari is known to have started dressing and behaving similarly to Auvinen in the period between the two shootings. Saari even made a pilgrimage to Jokela High School prior to his massacre. Finnish police first stated that Saari "very likely" knew Auvinen, but in the final investigation no proof of that was found.
- The 1999 Columbine High School massacre inspired numerous copycat crimes, including Seung Hui Cho's 2007 Virginia Tech massacre, Dimitrios Pagourtzis's Santa Fe High School shooting, Nikolas Cruz's 2018 Marjory Stoneman High School shooting, and Natalie Rupnow's Abundant Life Christian school shooting in the United States. Copycats outside the U.S. include the 2017 Ivanteyevka school attack, 2018 Perm school stabbing, Kerch Polytechnic College massacre and the Blagoveshchensk college shooting in Russia and Jose Ramos Betts's Colegio Cervantes shooting in Mexico. The W.R. Myers High School shooting, was allegedly inspired by Eric Harris and Dylan Klebold, the pair who committed the Columbine shooting.
- The 2014 Isla Vista killings inspired numerous copycat killings, including Christopher-Harper-Mercer's 2015 Umpqua Community College shooting, Alek Minassian's 2018 Toronto van attack, Faisal Hussain's 2018 Toronto shooting, Oguzhan Sert's 2020 Toronto machete attack, Armando Hernandez Jr’s 2020 Westgate Entertainment District shooting, and Jake Davison's Plymouth shooting. In a Facebook post Minassian would reference Elliot Rodger, the gunman who committed the Isla Vista killings.
- The 2012 Aurora theater shooting: On July 22, 2015 Robert and Michael Bever murdered their parents and three siblings; in his police interrogation Michael mentioned James Eagan Holmes as a prime inspiration for their attack and claimed that he and his brother intended to commit a shooting spree outside the family, hoping it would rival and even outdo both the 1999 Columbine High School massacre and The Aurora Theater Shooting, In prison Michael would keep a journal in which he names James Holmes as his hero, and also includes a page featuring a red swastika with 'white power' inside.
- Vladimir Ionesyan: Between 2014 and 2015, Anushervon Rakhmanov murdered seven people in Moscow, Russia in a manner resembling Ionesyan's. He would even use the same method as the former to enter each victim's house: by presenting himself as an employee of Mosgaz who was sent to check the pipes.
- Lam Kor-wan: After watching a videotape covering his crimes, habitual thief Luo Shubiao, who had committed a murder in 1977 but was not apprehended for it at the time, committed 18 copycat murders in Guangzhou, China from 1990 to 1994. The Chinese press even gave him the exact same nickname as Lam: "The Rainy Night Butcher".
- Nikolay Soltys: In August 2001 in Sacramento, California, Ukrainian immigrant, Nikolay Soltys, murdered seven members of his family in a stabbing spree. The attack inspired two killers in the same area. Almost a month later, Joseph Ferguson, a security guard, went on a shooting spree killing five people and injuring two others before committing suicide. Reportedly he was inspired by Soltys, saying he wanted to be a “top mass murderer” and wanted to “outo the Ukrainian immigrant.”
- Anatoly Onoprienko: Paroled rapist Yevhenii Balan committed nine murders and several rapes around Fastiv from 2006 to 2011, claiming after his arrest that he wanted to surpass Onoprienko in infamy.
- Anders Behring Breivik: On 22 July 2011, Anders Breivik carried out the 2011 Norway attacks in which he killed eight people by detonating a van bomb at Regjeringskvartalet in Oslo, and then killed 69 participants of a Workers' Youth League (AUF) summer camp, in a mass shooting on the island of Utøya. Breivik's manifesto 2083: A European Declaration of Independence circulated in online fascist forums where strategies were set and tactics debated. Australian terrorist Brenton Harrison Tarrant, who killed 51 people (all Muslims) and injured 50 more during the Christchurch mosque shootings at Al Noor Mosque and Linwood Islamic Centre in Christchurch, New Zealand, mentioned Breivik in his manifesto The Great Replacement as one of the far-right mass murderers and killers he supports. Tarrant said he "only really took true inspiration from Knight Justiciar Breivik" even going as far as to claim "brief contact" with him and his organization Knights' Templar.
- Brenton Tarrant: On March 15, 2019, Tarrant attacked two mosques in Christchurch, New Zealand while live streaming to Facebook live, killing 51 people. The attacks helped advance the Great replacement conspiracy theory and inspired several other attacks, including John Earnest's 2019 Poway synagogue shooting, Patrick Crusius's 2019 El Paso shooting, Philip Mashaus's 2019 Bærum mosque shooting, Stephan Balliet's 2019 Halle synagogue shooting, Nathaniel Veltman’s 2021 London, Ontario truck attack, Hugo Jackson's 2021 Eslöv school stabbing, Payton Gendron's 2022 Buffalo shooting, Juraj Krajčík's 2022 Bratislava shooting, Ryan Palmeter's 2023 Jacksonville shooting, Arda Küçükyetim’s 2024 Eskişehir stabbing, Timofey Kulyamov's 2025 Odintsovo school attack, and Cain Clark's and Caleb Vazquez's 2026 Islamic Center of San Diego shooting, six of which were live streamed.
- Suzano massacre: The Suzano massacre has inspired many copycat killers.
- 2023 Brazilian Congress attack: Following the 2022 Brazilian general election in which Luiz Inácio Lula da Silva defeated then-President Jair Bolsonaro, who refused to concede defeat, a mob of Bolsonaro supporters stormed federal government buildings on January 8, 2023. The attack was inspired by the January 6 United States Capitol attack and planned during Bolsonaro's presidency in the event that he was not re-elected.
- Attempted assassination of Fumio Kishida: On April 15, 2023, during an election campaign in Wakayama, Japanese Prime Minister Fumio Kishida survived an assassination attempt by a 24-year-old man named Ryūji Kimura. It is believed that the assassin was inspired by Tetsuya Yamagami, who successfully assassinated former Prime Minister Shinzo Abe during an election campaign in Nara on July 8, 2022. Yamagami's assassination attempt is described by some commentators as one of the most successful assassinations in modern history for causing huge political and reputational damage to Kishida and Abe's political party, the Liberal Democratic Party, and the Unification Church, which Yamagami claimed to be a victim of.
- Assassination of John F. Kennedy: Thomas Matthew Crooks, the gunman behind the attempted assassination of Donald Trump heavily researched the assassination of past U.S. president John F. Kennedy in preparation for his own crime.
- Jeffrey Dahmer: numerous murders and other violent crimes have been reported to have inspired by Dahmer, or committed by fans of Dahmer and other killers, including Chance Seneca, Taylor Schabusiness, Scarlett Jenkinson and Eddie Ratcliffe, and Miguel Cortés Miranda.
- Kerch Polytechnic College massacre: 15-year-old Daniil Pulkin, the perpetrator of the 2019 Volsk school attack, was obsessed with Vladislav Roslyakov, the gunman who perpetrated the Kerch massacre. Pulkin showed up to the school wearing a black t-shirt with the word "РАЗОЧАРОВАНИЕ" (which translates to "DISAPPOINTMENT") in red with the same font as Roslyakov's "HATRED" t-shirt. In August 2020, the minor was sentenced to seven years in prison in a juvenile hall.; According to Investigative Committee of Russia, Ilnaz Galyaviev, who committed an armed attack on a Kazan gymnasium in May 2021, "copied the actions of Vladislav Roslyakov" and other members of "destructive subculture".
- Murder of Nayera Ashraf: on June 20, 2022, Mohammad Adel approached fellow student Nayera Ashraf near Mansoura University, severely beat her, and stabbed her multiple times. Videos of the crime showed Ashraf fighting for her life as bystanders tried to help her. A few days later a similar incident occurred in which Jordanian student Iman Rashid, 21, was shot dead on a university campus. Rashid's killer shot himself dead during arrest. Before the murder the killer texted Rashid saying "I will do what the Egyptian guy did if you don't talk to me" referencing the murder of Nayera Ashraf.
- Oleg Kosarev: shortly after Kosarev's arrest, it was discovered that a copycat rapist named Valery Deyev was also committing similar crimes and even physically resembled him. Just a year later, a third man–known only by his surname, Bunin–was also caught and interned at a psychiatric institution.
- Aharon Galstyan: in 2016, a gang consisting of four men (Nazim Hasanov, Rakhim Aliyev, Sherzat Kodirov and Nakhmad Tarverdiyev) were convicted of fatally poisoning a man in St. Petersburg in a manner almost identical to Galstyan, and also posed as taxi drivers to lure in potential victims.
- Anton Niclas Lundin Pettersson: on 1 October 2019, student of Savo Vocational College (Finland) Joel Otto Aukusti Marin fatally stabbed another student and wounded 11 others. According to the prosecution, the idea of using a longsword was inspired by the 2015 school massacre in Sweden. On August 21, 2026, an 18-year-old man armed with a sword entered Brinellskolan, a school in Fagersta, Västmanland County, Sweden. The attack left one person dead and three others injured. According to Aftonbladet, the suspect wore black clothing, a helmet, and a face covering. Some reports compared his clothing to that worn by the perpetrator of the 2015 Trollhättan school attack.
- 2015 Phoenix freeway shootings: three 18-year-olds with a slingshot were arrested on 13 September 2015 on claims that they had been making copycat attacks, the three admitted to targeting cars and pedestrians. They were later released.
- Killing of the Clancy children: A 40-year-old mother in Illinois, Corie Walsh, has been charged with first-degree murder of her two-year-old son, Barrett. Some sources claim that she had become very invested in the high-profile Lindsay Clancy murder trial before the killing happened.

== See also ==
- Attack the Gas Station, a 1999 film that inspired copycat crimes
- Copycat, a 1995 film about a copycat serial killer
- Copycat suicide
- Scream, a 1996 film that inspired several copycat killers
- Crime mapping
- Fear of crime
- Gun violence
- Mass shooting contagion
- Hate crime
- Heriberto Seda (born 1967), a serial killer in New York, known as the "Copycat Zodiac Killer"
- Insanity defense
- Propaganda of the deed
- Sex crime
- Social policy
- True Crime Community
- Victimology
- The Following, a 2012 TV series about copycat crimes
- Ghost in the Shell: Stand Alone Complex, an animated television series where police are investigating a string of copycat crimes inspired by "The Laughing Man"
- Natural Born Killers, a 1994 action comedy about two kids who go on a killing spree that inspired multiple copycat crimes
- School shooting
