= Andrey Yezhov =

Russian serial killer and rapist (1967-2020)

- Born: Andrey Sergeyevich Yezhov; 16 August 1967; Sloboda, Smolensk Oblast, RSFSR
- Died: 6 July 2020 (aged 52); Noginsk, Moscow Oblast, Russia
- Cause of death: Suicide by hanging
- Other names: "The Kashirsky Maniac" "The Maniac Plumber" "The Podmoskovsky Chikatilo"
- Conviction: N/A
- Penalty: N/A

Details
- Victims: 7+
- Span of crimes: 2010–2020
- Country: Russia
- State: Moscow
- Date apprehended: 10 June 2020

Andrey Sergeyеvich Yezhov (Russian: Андрей Сергеевич Ежов; 16 August 1967 – 6 July 2020), known as The Kashirsky Maniac (Russian: Каширский маньяк, romanized: Kashirskiy manyak), was a Russian serial killer and rapist who was forensically linked to at least nine sexually motivated attacks against young girls and women in Moscow's Kashirsky and Stupinsky districts from 2010 to 2020, seven of which were fatal. He was arrested and later admitted to the respective crimes, but hanged himself in the detention center before he could be charged.

== Early life ==
Andrey Sergeyevich Yezhov was born in 1967 in the village of Sloboda, Smolensk Oblast, the younger of two sons born to a milkmaid and a tractor driver. While little is known of his childhood, neighbors described the Yezhovs as caring parents who never subjected their children to violence. When he became a teenager, unbeknownst to anyone in his family, Yezhov began spying on women who bathed in the village's bath house, a practice which he continued into adulthood. Around the same time, he had his first sexual encounter when he had sex with a dead cow - the pleasure provided by this act prompted him to start abusing other animals on the family farm.

After studying until the 8th grade in secondary school, Yezhov entered a vocational school, where he graduated with qualifications as a mechanic and tractor driver. He then enrolled and served in the Strategic Rocket Forces for several years, before returning to work as a stoker at a state dairy farm, where he was later promoted to being a driver. During his time there, he fell in love with another employee, Valentina, and soon the young couple moved to the Kashirsky District in Moscow in search of better job opportunities. Yezhov found himself a job as a driver at a farmers' co-op, while his girlfriend became a veterinarian. After spending six months together, the pair decided to get married, but at the wedding party, he fell in love with a female friend of his brother's wife, whom he started dating behind his wife's back.

Eventually, he left his wife and married the mistress, with whom he went on to have children and later grandchildren. However, family life did not deter him from his voyeurism, as he continued to peep on women bathing in bath houses. Alternatively, he would go peek through the windows of apartments on the first floor and watch the residents undress. In the mid-2000s, Yezhov's relationship with his wife deteriorated, as he began to spend more time by himself in his garage, drinking vodka.

== Murders ==
Yezhov's first known murder took place circa February 2010, in the Kashirsky District. One night, as he walked around the area, he stopped to peep through the window of a first-floor apartment, where he saw a 79-year-old woman sleeping on her bed. After watching her for around ten minutes, Yezhov went through the unlocked front door and strangled her in her sleep before proceeding to rape the woman's corpse. Afterwards, he stole a TV receiver and returned home, where he hid it in his garage. When the crime was discovered, investigators were able to obtain DNA from the killer, but due to the lack of witnesses or any solid leads to a suspect, Yezhov was not caught.

For the next three years, no known attack or murder was linked to Yezhov. One article speculated that he was afraid of being caught, or felt no need to claim another victim due to improving his relationship with his wife. In April 2013, after drinking vodka and going on another walk, he peered through the window of a residential building, where he located a 95-year-old pensioner sleeping in her nightgown. After confirming that she was alone, Yezhov went inside by slipping through a small window in the bathroom, went to the woman's room, and subsequently strangled her. However, he was unable to sustain an erection, prompting him to grab a nearby object and sodomize the body. He then stole six of her deceased husband's medals and left the apartment.

Not long after, Yezhov planned another attack, this time in the neighboring Stupino District. On his way home from work at the Domodedovo Airport, he stopped at Stupino Station and started looking for a suitable victim. He eventually found a 60-year-old woman lying on her sofa, and after entering through a window, he strangled and raped her. As the victim was poor, he took nothing from the apartment and returned to the station, where he caught the next train home.

After another two-year-long break, Yezhov killed his next victim in March 2015. While he was repairing some items in his garage, a drunken 42-year-old comptroller stumbled into the premises. Whilst she was younger than his usual victim type, he nonetheless decided to kill her as well. After she refused a drink for him, Yezhov overpowered her before strangling the woman. He then dragged the body to the back seat of his car, where he raped the corpse. Upon finishing, he drove to an isolated area in Tesna Station, where he dumped the body in the woods.

After taking another four-year-long break, Yezhov committed two murders in November and December 2019: both took place in the Kashirsky District against two elderly women (aged 70 and 75, respectively) who lived on the same street. Despite the authorities correctly summarizing that the crimes were committed by the same perpetrator, and checking the local railway employees for involvement, they were unable to obtain any useful genetic samples. On 3 January 2020, Yezhov climbed through a bedroom window into the room of a 10-year-old girl, whom he raped and attempted to strangle. However, he was prevented from finishing her off by her parents, who rushed to her aid but were unable to catch the assailant. The girl was driven to the hospital, where doctors asserted that the hyoid bone had been broken, and she likely would have been killed. After the attack, the victim spent a month in hospital and was later ordered to undergo psychiatric counseling.

While the police were investigating and clearing the male family members as per police procedure, Yezhov attacked again the following month, attempting to strangle a 14-year-old girl whom he found sleeping by herself at home. The girl fiercely resisted and hit him several times, disorienting her attacker and forcing him to break a nearby window and flee. While the girl immediately called the police, they were still unable to capture him in time. After these two attempted murders, Yezhov took another four-month break, before claiming his final victim on 8 June. On that day, he broke into a house on Dzerzhinskaya Street in the Kashirsky District, where he strangled and raped an 88-year-old pensioner. Following the murder, he stole the woman's passbook and attempted to steal her TV, but the TV proved to be too heavy, so he left it at the porch. The victim's body was discovered a few days later by a social worker.

== Investigation, arrest and suicide ==
Soon after the discovery of the latest victim's body, the Moscow City Police decided to check the surveillance cameras for any possible clues. While browsing through the footage, they came across a peculiar scene showing an unidentified male in a denim suit disposing of a pile of documents in a pile of grass, not far from the crime scene. They went to investigate the scene, and after examining them, authorities determined that they belonged to the elderly woman.

In the ensuing investigation, DNA samples were collected from a variety of men living in the area, including Yezhov. These samples were examined by two investigative committees, which positively linked his DNA to three of the murders and the rape of the 10-year-old girl. On 10 June 2020, Yezhov was finally arrested by police officers, much to the shock of his family members and neighbours, who believed that the authorities had made a mistake. To their shock, however, Yezhov readily confessed not only to the crimes he was linked to, but four other murders and one more rape dating back to 2010. When asked for his motive, he claimed that he had a "periodic desire to kill" and that he liked to have sex with corpses.

For the next few weeks, Yezhov actively cooperated with investigators, explaining in detail how he committed his attacks in a calm, collected manner. The case was extensively covered in the Muscovite press at the time, which heavily emphasized on the fact of how a seemingly "normal"-looking man was able to commit such heinous acts, or compared him to other infamous murderers like Andrei Chikatilo, Vladimir Ionesyan and Anushervon Rakhmanov.

While awaiting charges for his crimes, Yezhov was detained at a detention center in Noginsk. On 6 July 2020, prison guards found Yezhov dead in his cell. A preliminary autopsy report concluded that he had killed himself by hanging, with prison authorities announcing that an audit would take place to determine whether negligence on behalf of their staff allowed the detainee to end his own life. Even before his suicide, both law enforcement and psychiatrist Alexandr Bukhanovsky, who created the psychological profile of Andrei Chikatilo, stated their belief that Yezhov likely had more victims between his "gaps", possibly dating back to the 1990s.

== See also ==
- Incidents of necrophilia
- List of Russian serial killers
