= Reza Khan (disambiguation) =

Reza Khan may refer to:

- Reza-Qoli Khan Hedayat (1800–1871), Persian writer and poet
- Ahmed Raza Khan Barelvi (1856–1921), Pashtun scholar
- Reza Shah (1878–1944), Shah of the Imperial State of Iran from 1925 to 1941
- Reza Khan (Afghan) (d. 2007), Afghan who was executed in 2007
- Reza Khan, Iran, a village in Lorestan Province, Iran
- Mohammad Ali Reza Khan (born 1947), Bangladeshi ornithologist
