= Anushervon Rakhmanov =

Suspected Tajikistani-Russian serial killer

- Born: 1995; Tajikistan
- Died: April 2, 2015 (aged 19–20); Matrosskaya Tishina, Moscow, Russia
- Cause of death: Suicide by hanging
- Other name: "Mosgaz-2"
- Conviction: N/A
- Penalty: N/A

Details
- Victims: 7 (not confirmed, died before trial)
- Span of crimes: 2014–2015
- Country: Russia
- State: Moscow
- Date apprehended: March 14, 2015

Anushervon Rakhmanov (Russian: Анушервон Рахманов; Tajik: Анушервон Раҳмонов 1995 – April 2, 2015) was a suspected Tajikistani-Russian serial killer who was linked to the murders of seven people, including a family of four, in Moscow between 2014 and 2015. Believed to be a copycat of Soviet criminal Vladimir Ionesyan, he was thus nicknamed Mosgaz-2. He hanged himself at his jail cell in Matrosskaya Tishina before he could stand trial for the murders.

== Early life ==
Born in Tajikistan in 1995, Anushervon was brought up and studied in Moscow from an early age. He came from a modest, hard-working family, which had no trouble with law enforcement. Rakhmanov was described as a handsome, well-dressed young man who often hung out with friends and frequently got tips from girls at his job as a waiter, owing to his knack for complimenting them. After graduating college, he began work as an auto mechanic. Despite earning a significant income at the job, he felt that spending the rest of his life earning money by fixing other people's cars should not be his fate; that he should instead be partying and picking up pretty girls around the Moscow nightclubs. Since that lavish lifestyle required far more money than he currently earned, he decided that he quickly obtain it by committing robberies.

== Murders ==
In October 2014, Rakhmanov wandered the city centre at night, peering through the windows of houses in search of a potential victim he could rob. He stopped in front of a house on Bashilovskaya Street, near the Savyolovsky Railway Station, pressing the intercom button and awaiting the tenant to open the door. Instead of mugging the man, Anushervon thought that it would be safer to rob one of the apartments, and lay in waiting until the man went back to the elevator. He then quickly snuck up the stairs, setting on a random door, putting on his rubber gloves beforehand, and ringing the doorbell. It is unclear under exactly what pretence the owner, a 50-year-old woman, opened the door for him: according to one claim, he introduced himself as a Mosgaz employee, and in another, as a downstairs neighbour. But nevertheless, he was let into the apartment. After inspecting the residence for some time, the woman began to grow suspicious of Rakhmanov, who pulled out a knife and began stabbing her. The victim managed to survive long enough to tell him that there were 140,000 rubles hidden in a cache, which Anushervon stole and then fled the premises. He caught a taxi, bought himself a new jacket and some Spice, and returned to his parents' house, acting as if nothing had happened.

By early December, he had spent all of the stolen rubles on Spice and alcohol, with the harsh withdrawal prompting him to go hunting once again. On December 5, he knocked on the door of an apartment on Nagatinskaya Street, introducing himself as a Mosgaz employee who needed to check the pipe system. He was welcomed in by 52-year-old Elena Zarubina, who felt safe around the stranger, as her husband Anatoly (52), son Alexei (27) and elderly mother Elena were inside with her. Unlike the previous crime, Rakhmanov took his time, chatting with Alexei on the balcony. Then, he took out the knife and stabbed him, before moving on to kill the younger Elena, and finally Anatoly and the elder Elena, who were both fast asleep. After ransacking the apartment and stealing 70,000 rubles, he released one of the gas valves, expecting that an explosion would occur and destroy the evidence, but that did not happen.

Following the brutal murder of the family, Anushervon laid low for two months. Despite the fact that his addictions prevented him from thinking clearly, he was successful in avoiding the authorities, who by then were aware that a serial offender was on the prowl in the city. He managed to obtain a fake passport, and signed into the Sevastopol Hotel, where he would reside until his arrest.

In March, he eventually ran out of money, and by this time, his addiction to Spice had grown so clinical that he could not last a day without it. He travelled to Akademik Vargi Street, in southwestern Moscow, and again managed to enter an apartment while pretending to be a Mosgaz employee. After killing the 65-year-old woman occupying the premises, he stole 40,000 rubles and burned down the place in an attempt to cover his tracks. However, detectives examined the crime scene and took notice of the footprints left behind by the perpetrator. Using this, and other evidence collected during the investigations, they eventually tracked down Rakhmanov to his hotel room at the Sevastopol Hotel, where he was arrested on March 14.

== Death ==
After his arrest, Rakhmanov admitted to all of the killings, in addition to confessing another which was not linked to the series by the investigators. He claimed that his motive was robbery and that the victims were chosen at random, but was incapable of reproducing how he committed the acts, as he was always drugged while doing so. He was incarcerated at Matrosskaya Tishina to await trial, but on April 2, 2015, he was found hanging from his cell. The coroners determined that he killed himself.

== See also ==
- Copycat crime
- List of Russian serial killers
