= The Copycat Effect =

2004 book by Loren Coleman

- Cover of the first edition
- Author: Loren Coleman
- Language: English
- Subject: Copycat crime and suicide
- Publisher: Paraview Pocket Books
- Publication date: 2004
- Publication place: United States
- ISBN: 0-7434-8223-9
- OCLC: 55146568
- Dewey Decimal: 303.6
- LC Class: HM1206 .C646 2004

The Copycat Effect: How the Media and Popular Culture Trigger the Mayhem in Tomorrow's Headlines is a 2004 book by suicide researcher Loren Coleman. It was published by Paraview Pocket Books, and focuses on the eponymous copycat effect (both copycat crime and copycat suicide). Coleman criticizes mass media's coverage and representation of tragedies and violence, arguing it leads to more imitation cases. He focuses on specific cases in the book. The response to the book was mixed, with commentators praising its delivery and evidence, though others criticized its tone and title as misleading.

== Background and publication ==
Coleman has a master's degree in psychiatric social work and was a consultant for the Maine Youth Suicide Program for nearly a decade. He has lectured often on the impact of the media on suicide and murder. He has specialized in the Werther, or copycat effect, a phenomenon resulting in many copycat suicides following the publication of a 1774 novel, The Sorrows of Young Werther. He had published a previous book on the topic, Suicide Clusters, in 1987.

== Contents ==
Several chapters are reprinted from Suicide Clusters. The Copycat Effect is arranged thematically, covering specific incidents. In the book, he criticizes the media for their coverage of these events, focusing on several high profile incidents of suicide and murder leading to copycat incidents. He argues that the media's sensationalization of local violence, such as school shootings, can lead to copycat attempts. Topics include cult leaders, celebrity suicides, sniper killings and suicide clusters. He concludes with several recommendations as to how these kinds of events should be handled, suggesting that the media cover them more responsibly.

== Reception ==
Publishers Weekly said the book presented Coleman's advice "with enough punch to intrigue the public and possibly exert a minor influence on the press", though noted "readers may feel there's little they can do to muzzle media destructiveness". Kirkus Reviews criticized what they perceived as its "scolding tone", saying it diminished the book's persuasiveness; however said Coleman offered "persuasive and often chilling evidence" of his thesis. Library Journal recommended the book, calling it "really the only survey available on this topic", however criticized the inclusion of the section on baseball suicides, calling it out of place, and said the book left the reader wondering whether Coleman wished to "warn the public or to sanitize art".

Ashley Sayeau of The Boston Globe criticized its title, saying that it was misleading for the reader. She said that it seemed that Coleman was merely enduring the discussion of media, when instead he wanted to focus more on suicide itself. Thomas Joiner criticized Coleman's argument that the coverage of Kurt Cobain's suicide had led to an increase in copycat suicides, saying that the fact that many suicide victims happened to be Nirvana fans was only evidence of their popularity.
