= Lam Kor-wan =

Hong Kong serial killer

- Born: Lam Kwok-yue (林國裕); 22 May 1955 (age 71); British Hong Kong
- Other names: The Jars Murderer; The Rainy Night Butcher; The Rainy Night Killer; The Hong Kong Butcher
- Status: Incarcerated
- Conviction: Murder (4 counts)
- Penalty: Death; commuted to life imprisonment without parole

Details
- Victims: 4
- Country: Hong Kong
- Date apprehended: 17 August 1982

Lam Kor-wan
- Traditional Chinese: 林過雲
- Simplified Chinese: 林过云
Transcriptions
Standard Mandarin
- Hanyu Pinyin: Lín Guòyún
Yue: Cantonese
- Jyutping: lam4 gwo3 wan4

Lam Kor-wan (Chinese: 林過雲; Jyutping: lam4 gwo3 wan4; born 22 May 1955) is one of Hong Kong's most notorious serial killers.

== Early life ==
=== Childhood ===
Lam was born in British Hong Kong on 22 May 1955 as Lam Kwok-yue. From 1957 to 1962, his father worked for a petroleum company in Brunei, and Lam and his sister went to live with his mother in the company's dormitory, together with his father's concubine and his half-siblings. In December 1962, Lam returned to Hong Kong with his family, where they moved into their own home in Kwun Tong, and he attended a government elementary school, usually performing in the top ten of his class. In 1970, Lam's father opened a store selling motorcycles and asked him to help out in the shop after school every day, which led to a decline in Lam's grades and a deterioration in his relationship with his father, who often scolded him and drove him away from home. After graduating from secondary school, Lam started working in his father's motorcycle store on Hong Ning Road, Kwun Tong, and then worked as an air-conditioning apprentice for a relative.

=== Adulthood ===
In early 1973, Lam was expelled from his home after an argument with his father. He was arrested after he threatened a woman with a knife and touched her lower body with his hand near a public toilet in Hok Yuen Street, Hung Hom. After 102 days of treatment in Castle Peak Hospital, he was discharged and temporarily renamed Lam Yau-keung. When Lam was about 19 years old, his family noticed that he was behaving abnormally and was interested in female flesh. He was later caught peeping at his sister's naked body outside the toilet of his residence in Kwun Tong. In 1978, Lam obtained a cab license and changed his name to Lam Kor-wan after he officially became a cab driver, and in about 1980, he became a night-time cab driver. In 1981, he suddenly became interested in photography, began to study photography techniques and joined a photography club. One year after Lam worked as a night-time cab driver, his mother noticed that his behaviour had changed significantly, such as his refusal to change clothes and take a shower, and his depressed behaviour.

== Crimes ==
Lam, who worked as a taxi driver, would pick up female passengers, strangle them with electrical wire, take them to his family home, and dismember them. His English moniker, "The Jars Murderer", was coined when the police revealed that he had hoarded sexual organs in Tupperware containers. He was a keen photographer and frequently took pictures and video of his victims, even filming himself performing an act of necrophilia with his fourth victim. Lam shared his bedroom with his brother, who was unaware of his activities; Lam worked the night shift, so he was able to dismember victims at home during the daytime without his immediate family finding out. The brother was initially a suspect in the investigation, but police later determined that Lam acted alone. The bodies were disposed of via his taxi in the New Territories and on Hong Kong Island, and all were eventually located.

=== Victims ===
Chan Fung-lan, a victim of Lam Kor-wan.

- Chan Fung-lan (陳鳳蘭), female, age 22, body found in seven separate pieces in the Shing Mun River, New Territories.
- Chan Wan-kit (陳雲潔), female, age 31, body found in a rice bag near Tai Hang Road, Hong Kong Island.
- Leung Sau-wan (梁秀雲), female, age 29, body found in a rice bag near Tai Hang Road, Hong Kong Island.
- Leung Wai-sum (梁惠心), female, age 17, body found in a rice bag near Tai Hang Road, Hong Kong Island.

==== Chan Fung-lan ====
On 3 February 1982, 22-year-old nightclub dancer Chan Fung-lan took a cab outside Chinese Palace Nightclub And Restaurant in Kimberley Road, Tsim Sha Tsui East at 4:00 a.m., after drinking with friends. After driving her to Kwun Tong, he drove her back downstairs to his home in Kwei Chau Street and returned to his home to retrieve the electrical cord, then strangled her to death in the car and took her body home to hide it under the sofa in the living room. Hours later, he used Chan's wallet to buy an electric saw at a nearby To Kwa Wan shop. The next day, after the people in the house had gone out, Lam stripped the body of its clothes and took pictures of the body. The body was then dismembered into seven pieces and the process was recorded in the video "Serious Secrets". The sexual organs were placed in a plastic box and preserved with rice wine, and the body was wrapped in newspaper and placed in a plastic bag. The body was later washed down the Shing Mun River by heavy rain and floated to the area between Fo Tan, Lucky Plaza and Belair Gardens, all located in Sha Tin District, New Territories.

==== Chan Wan-kit ====
31-year-old trade cashier Chan Wan-kit took a cab outside Woosung Street from work at 5:20 a.m. on 29 May 1982. She was then handcuffed and strangled to death with an electric cord. This time, Lam used a surgical scalpel to dismember the victim and cut off both breasts and the entire pubic area for embalming. The rest of the body was wrapped in newspaper and then placed in a sack, and the body was placed in the trunk of a cab to be disposed of at night on the slope of Tai Hang Road. The dismemberment was recorded in the video "A Serious Secret".

==== Leung Sau-wan ====
29-year-old street cleaner Leung Sau-wan got off work outside in Nathan Road at 4 a.m. on 17 June 1982 and took a taxi driven by Lam. She was killed soon after at Argyle Street. Lam took the body home to take pictures and video of the dismemberment. The video was called "Operation Rainy Night". In order to facilitate "work", Lam put the camcorder on a bed and used the selfie function to take pictures of his actions. Since there was no need to manipulate the camcorder, Lam's dismemberment work was more careful than the last two times. He even cut the abdomen of Leung, picked out the intestines, and put them in his mouth to taste. Lam had the urge to taste human flesh but finally gave up because he felt sick. The limbs were abandoned on Tai Hang Road.

==== Leung Wai-sum ====
After attending a thank-you party at the Sheraton Hotel in Salisbury Road on 2 July 1982, 17-year-old Saint Andrews School student Leung Wai-sum boarded a cab outside the hotel at 11:00 p.m. to return to her apartment in Valley Road Estate in Hung Hom. The family members called the students who went to the banquet and searched for her in Tsim Sha Tsui, but to no avail. The Saint Andrews School also notified the Leung family that she missed her HKCEE report card. The police reported the missing person's information to all police patrols and hospitals in Hong Kong, and issued a search notice and photos on August 5 to appeal to the public for information, but there were still no results. Lam claimed that he handcuffed Leung's hands and strangled her with an electric cord after talking to her in a cab about school, her future, her family, religion, and her soul, and then took the body home to rape and dismember it.

== Arrest ==
Lam was arrested by plainclothes officers on 17 August 1982. He had attempted to develop photographs of one of his dismembered victims at a Kodak shop. The manager of the Mong Kok shop tipped off the police and they were waiting for him when he returned to pick up the photos. When confronted, Lam claimed that the photographs belonged to a friend of his who worked on a ship who would meet him shortly; when the man did not appear the police accompanied Lam to his parents' first-floor apartment on Kwei Chau Street and performed a search. The police located an old ammunition box in the bedroom he shared with his brother; the box contained pornography and more photographs of body parts, videotapes and several Tupperware containers containing women's sexual organs.

== Trial ==
On 8 April 1983, at the end of a long three-week trial with a seven-man jury, Lam was found guilty of four counts of murder and sentenced to death by hanging. On 29 August 1984, Lam's sentence was commuted to life imprisonment after Sir Edward Youde accepted Lam's mercy plea, as was the tradition before the abolition of the death penalty in Hong Kong in 1993. He is currently serving his life sentence at the maximum-security Shek Pik Prison, although he was originally serving his sentence in Stanley Prison. When speaking to psychiatrist Dr. William Green, Lam stated that he "ate part of the intestine of one of the victims", and that his motivation was not primarily sexual, but that "it was God who told him to kill the victims".

The victims were identified by two lecturers from the Prince Philip Dental Hospital, part of the University of Hong Kong, who created and perfected a new system of photo-superimposition. This involved taking an ante-mortem photograph of the possible victim with a radiograph (x-ray) of the post-mortem skull of the possible victim and superimposing the photo on the skull and matching similarities, similar to the forensic method employed with fingerprints.

After the trial, all of Lam's photographs and videos were destroyed due to concerns about similar crimes and the selling of the videos.

== In popular culture ==
Lam Kor-wan is portrayed by Hong Kong actor Simon Yam in the movie Dr. Lamb (1992).

A fictionalised Lam was later portrayed by Lawrence Ng in the 1994 film The Underground Banker. It imagines Lam, now released from prison, as a reformed Buddhist who is friendly and helpful to his neighbour and only returns to his psychotic killing state to help his neighbour take revenge on Triads who raped, murdered or maimed most of his family.

The 1999 film Trust me U Die is sometimes known by the alternate title The New Dr. Lamb, but has no connection to Lam Kor-Wan or the previous film except that both star Simon Yam.

In the Cantonese dub of South Park, the episode "Merry Christmas, Charlie Manson!" changes Charles Manson to a parodied version, called Lam Kor-fan (林過份).

== See also ==
- Lam Kwok-wai
- Luo Shubiao
- Tsui Po-ko
- List of serial killers by country
- Human cannibalism
