= Hoshang Amini =

Iranian serial killer (1936–1963)

- Born: 1936; Varamin, Tehran Province, Iran
- Died: December 1963 (aged 27); Toopkhaneh, Tehran, Tehran Province, Iran
- Cause of death: Execution by hanging
- Other names: "The Ghost of the Qanat Wells" "The Felt Hat Killer"
- Conviction: Murder x67
- Penalty: Death

Details
- Victims: 67
- Span of crimes: 1954–1962
- Country: Iran
- State: Tehran
- Date apprehended: 1962

Hoshang Amini (Persian: هوشنگ امینی; 1936 – December 1963), known as The Ghost of the Qanat Wells (شبح چاه‌های قنات), was an Iranian serial killer and rapist who murdered 67 people in the city of Varamin from 1954 to 1962, sometimes aided by accomplices. He earned his nickname for decapitating his victims post-mortem and then dumping their bodies into wells.

After his arrest, he confessed to the full scope of his crimes, expressing no remorse for what he had done. He was trialed, convicted and executed a few months after his arrest.

He is the most prolific known serial killer in Iran's history, surpassing Asghar the Murderer.

== Early life ==
Relatively little is known about Amini's personal life. Born in 1936 in Varamin, he was part of a large family which his father had abandoned at some point in time. Hoshang grew up in poverty, and was physically abused by other family members.

As an adult, he remained single and was unemployed, but nonetheless enjoyed the compositions of Parviz Yahaghi and poems from Hafez. At some point, he developed an obsession with "ridding the world of corruption", and would claim in later interviews that he was inspired by Asghar the Murderer to start killing people. At the time of the crimes, he was studying to become an apprentice truck driver and was known to extort traders in Varamin.

== Murders ==
Amini's modus operandi consisted of picking out predominantly vulnerable young boys (although he also killed adult men and women) from the streets of Varamin, whom he abducted or lured to isolated areas. Once away from prying eyes, he would tie up the victim's hands and proceeded to rape and torture them before ultimately strangling them. Afterwards, he would decapitate the victim with a knife and usually dump the body in a nearby well.

His first known victim was sometime in March 1954, after which the headless body was found in an aqueduct in Nematabad. Only a month later, the decapitated body of a young woman was also found in similar circumstances in Dowlatabad. Such gruesome crimes continued to occur in and around Varamin for several years, with similar reported killings being uncovered in other areas as well. On occasion, he was aided by unnamed accomplices - in one instance, Amini and several other friends got drunk, abducted a young boy and took turns raping him and cutting pieces of his flesh before ultimately killing him.

News about the crimes became national news in the early 1960s when the body of an unidentified German man was found in the local cemetery in Mesgarabad, in the same condition as the previous victims. Police were unable to gather any clues, from which numerous theories about the murder appeared, with some claiming that he had possibly been hypnotized. Soon afterwards, rumours started to spread that a child-eating cannibal had appeared in the city, leading most of the population to panic due to the increasing frequency of young boys disappearing. Some of the victims were never found.

The final known victims were discovered in 1962 after a court employee contacted the police and informed them that he had stumbled upon a blood trail leading to a nearby well. Once examined, the policemen found the bodies of two young boys who had their hands tied behind their backs and had been beheaded. After examining reports for local missing persons, they established that the two victims were local ticker vendors who had recently vanished.

== Arrest, trial and confessions ==
There are differing accounts of how Amini was apprehended. In one account, on the day of Nowruz, police noticed a young vagrant near the well who seemed to be acting suspiciously. Suspecting that he might be an accomplice in the crimes, he was detained and questioned, revealing that his name was Hoshang Amini, but categorically refused to admit involvement in the murders. However, he instead requested to be interviewed by a news reporter, to whom he immediately confessed to killing a number of children, as well as the German man.

In another version, it is claimed that police arrested a man named Hamid for an unrelated series of bicycle thefts in Tehran, and that he gave them Amini's address, claiming that he was an accomplice. However, when they arrived at his house, he was nowhere to be seen. Police continued to search for him, eventually identifying him as the prime suspect in the murders, and ultimately arrested him at his sister's house, where he was found hiding in a chest. Reportedly, he had managed to avoid detection by cross-dressing.

Using information provided by the detainee, police were able to locate additional bodies and identified the German as an economic consultant named Ernst Lange. When questioned, Amini claimed that he had stumbled upon the drunken Lange in Tehran, whereupon he abducted him, drove him to Mesgarabad, robbed him of his money and threw him into the well. In subsequent interviews, Amini confessed to a total of 67 murders, including some committed in northern Iran.

The arrest caused a media frenzy, with many journalists noting how Amini's calm demeanour and polite manner of speaking contrasted with the gruesomeness of his crimes. He was also noted for being dishevelled, having bad breath and for wearing a particular felt hat, for which some newspapers nicknamed him "The Felt Hat Killer" (Persian: قاتل کلاه نمدی). In interviews given to the press, Amini claimed that he had been inspired by Asghar the Murderer, and similarly wanted to rid society of people he considered to be corrupt. Following the revelations of his crimes, he was publicly disowned by his family, almost all of whom refused to interact with him at all during his trial and subsequent imprisonment.

After a short trial, Amini was found guilty on all counts and sentenced to death. While awaiting execution on death row, he was visited by his older brother, who scolded him for his terrible crimes before leaving in anger. The severity of the crimes got the attention of one of Amini's idols, Parviz Yahaghi, who would go on to record interviews with him on a cassette tape on five separate prison visits. Although he censored most of the gruesome details of the crimes, Yahaghi was prohibited from releasing the interviews to the public out of concern for the family members of the victims. Amini later said that he wanted his last visitor to be Yahaghi, whom he now considered his friend.

== Execution ==
In December 1963, Amini was publicly hanged in Toopkhaneh, alongside another murderer, Safar Ali Rahimi. The event was attended by numerous onlookers from Varamin and even Tehran. Before his execution, he was allowed to sing a poem from Hafez, and in the final minutes before the trap door was sprung, he told two journalists the following: "Killing me will not solve anything. Go find the cause. You have so many doctors. There are 3,000 people like me in Tehran. I am not afraid."

After the execution, as per his wishes, his body was handed to an older brother, who then buried it in an undisclosed location.

== In the media and culture ==
In 2015, famous actor and film director Zakaria Hashemi released a book titled "The Last Execution" (Persian: آخرین اعدام), a partially-fictionalized account of Amini's crimes. Hashemi got the inspiration to write about the case after being gifted a cassette tape featuring an interview with Amini.

== See also ==
- List of serial killers by country
