= Luo Shubiao =

Executed Chinese serial killer

- 罗树标
- Luo after his arrest
- Born: August 20, 1954; Guangzhou, China
- Died: January 20, 1995 (aged 40); Guangzhou, China
- Cause of death: Execution by shooting
- Other name: "The Rainy Night Butcher"
- Convictions: Murder (19 counts); Robbery; Theft
- Penalty: Death

Details
- Victims: 19
- Span of crimes: 1977; 1990 – 1994
- Country: China
- State: Guangdong
- Date apprehended: September 19, 1994

Luo Shubiao (Chinese: 罗树标; August 20, 1954 – January 20, 1995), known as The Rainy Night Butcher (Chinese: 雨夜屠夫; pinyin: Yǔyè túfū), was a Chinese serial killer and rapist. After committing a rape-murder in 1977 and serving a prison sentence for theft, he started targeting young women around Guangzhou, killing a further eighteen victims from 1990 to 1994. Luo would be convicted of these murders and subsequently executed a year later.

== Early life ==
Luo Shubiao was born on August 20, 1954, in Guangzhou, an only child from a working-class family. He started stealing while he was still in high school, and after graduating, he studied carpentry. In 1974, he was sent to a labor camp for two years for theft. In the beginning of 1977, Luo snuck into the Municipal Household Appliances Research Institute, ostensibly to steal some items, where he was caught in the act by a woman named Feng Liyun. Unwilling to let himself be arrested, he raped and beat Feng to death with a tire iron, but was not arrested for this crime. Two years later, he was sent to another labor camp for theft, where he spent the following three years.

After his release in 1982, Luo married Liu Meiting in September of that year and soon had a son and daughter with her. In February 1983, he was given a 5-year prison sentence for theft, but while he was serving it, he continued to steal items such as bras, panties and other lingerie. After his release in 1987, he found a job in the interior design industry, before switching to private transportation.

According to his own confessions later on, during this time, he often watched videotapes depicting either pornography or graphic violence, one of which was about Hong Kong serial killer Lam Kor-wan, who was known for mutilating and chopping off the breasts and genitalia of his victims. Luo claimed that he found these acts "exciting and challenging", and felt a strong desire to imitate them. As a start, he would steal women's lingerie and jot down his thefts in a notebook, of which there were at least 208 instances of such acts. Beginning in 1989, Luo started to scavenge for broken, full-body plastic mannequins discarded from local fashion stores, which he would assemble as his own female "models" and dress them in stolen clothing to admire.

== Murders ==
From 1989 up until his arrest in September 1994, Luo would drive around the Tianhe District with his truck, picking up at least 260 prostitutes in the process. As a rule of thumb, he would immediately kill any who resisted his advances, asked him to wear a condom, did not allow him to have sex with them twice, or checked his license plate.

On the evening of February 7, 1990, Luo drove around for about two hours around the Xinzhou section before he picked up a young woman, whom he then drove to the Pazhou Dairy Farm. There, he began raping her, but as the woman fiercely resisted his advances, he killed her, raped her body and then dumped it by the roadside of Dunhe Road. He went to check if somebody had found the body on the next day, and for a while, he was paranoid that the police would come and arrest him. As time passed by, however, Luo became convinced that the authorities only investigated those who were in intimate relations with the victims, which naturally excluded him as a suspect.

From February 1991 onwards, Luo continued to carry out murders, always late at night. He would then transport the corpse with his truck and carry it to the attic, where he cut off the victim's vulva, shoved panties and socks into the vaginal area and even left his semen inside to see if the police would be able to detect it. Once he was finished, he would put the corpses in burlap sacks, oil drums or wooden boxes, then drop them off in isolated sections of Xinjiao Town. He was caught doing this by his wife on one occasion, but lied to her that he was in a fatal car crash and this was the body of the other driver. Luo claimed that his success in concealing himself gave him a sense of pleasure and he felt like he could do whatever he wanted.

After each murder, he would write down the victim's physical features, clothing, sexual experiences, his own feelings and the process of disposing the body in a notebook, which he would later re-read for his own gratification. Later on, after hearing that the security organs' investigation of the crimes was tightening, he destroyed the notebook, but re-wrote the contents in another way.

On May 25, 1992, Luo was suddenly arrested in the middle of the night by police officers in the Tianhe District, who charged him with soliciting prostitutes. For this, he was sent to a labor camp for six months, during which he saw an emergency investigation report by the Municipal Public Security Bureau on the crimes. Fearing imminent arrest, he managed to escape from the camp but ceased killing for nearly half a year. He resumed his activities in March 1994, killing an additional four prostitutes until his arrest in September of that year.

== Investigation ==
The killings caused a great stir in contemporary Chinese society, and received heavy coverage from both domestic and foreign news media, which greatly pressured the security organs to capture the killer. According to the investigators, all of the victims were young women who were not native to Guangzhou, some of whom may have worked secretly as prostitutes. All were strangled, stuffed and disposed of in a similar manner and in the same geographic area.

After the fourth murder, the leaders of the Public Security Department implemented a variety of measures in an attempt to catch the killer, including routine examination of suspicious people or objects; patrols and ambushes; collecting material evidence and other police procedures, which, while common-place and routine elsewhere, were considered unprecedented at the time. The Haizhu District Bureau created a dedicated task force on three separate occasions, increasing the number of police officers each time. The officers' duties included the inspection of suspicious individuals and convicted criminals, as well as setting up check-points and road-blocks. Due to these measures, a number of unrelated rape and murder cases involving mutilation were resolved and the perpetrators identified and arrested.

In early March 1992, the Criminal Investigation Department printed more than 36,000 flyers with color illustrations, complete with a facial composite of the suspect and a range of possible scenarios of how he might approach and engage potential victims, which were spread throughout the area. At the same time, policemen were additionally tasked with investigating more than 3,800 grain departments and hemp spinning factories in Guangdong and the surrounding provinces, in an attempt to pin down the exact origin of the burlap sacks used in the killings. In the process, more than 4,600 such sacks were sent to the Agricultural Science Institute for investigation and 1,686,000 fingerprints examined, eventually resulting in the collection of the killer's DNA.

From the period of February 1990 to May 1992, public officials and high-ranking members of the police force would frequently hold meetings discussing the case. During one such meeting, four deputy directors suggested that a polygraph be used in the interrogation of two key suspects, the first time such technology had been used in the province's history.

In July 1992, the Guangzhou Public Security Bureau identified Zhang Qide, a soldier serving with the 6807 garrison, as a potential suspect in one of the cases. While he was arrested and later cleared of suspicion, investigators started taking into consideration several aspects of the killings that could lead to the identification of the murderer:

1. Judging by the fact that most bodies were dumped in or around Xinjiao Town, it was assumed that the killer either worked or lived in the area.
2. Since most victims were either prostitutes or were dressed in a similar manner, it was inferred that the crimes were committed out of hatred for the profession, hooliganism or sexual assault. Due to this, the suspect's age was narrowed down to the range of 20 to 40.
3. Due to the fact that all of the killings involved mutilation of and insertion of objects into the victim's genitalia, it was inferred this was done either out of hatred towards women or out of sexual perversion. Authorities thus inspected outpatient departments' patients in order to better understand this aspect.
4. Tire marks were found at each dumping site, indicating that the killer used a car to transport the bodies. Because of this, all vehicles that matched the tire marks were thoroughly searched.

From these points, investigators deduced that the killer likely was not acquainted with any of the victims; often revisited the crime scenes; was aware of investigative procedures to a certain extent; and while he acted alone, likely had a family and did not live alone. However, due to the department's inexperience with sexually motivated crimes, many details were missed out which prevented the earlier, proper identification and capture of Luo.

== Arrest, trial and execution ==
On September 19, 1994, the Xijiao Town Police Chief, Lu Guangrong, received a report from a young woman named Huang Yanhong, claiming that on the previous night, she had had her handbag stolen and was nearly killed by a stranger while she waiting for her train at the train station. A team of officers was dispatched to investigate the area, and after careful examination, they identified Luo Shubiao as the prime suspect. After he was positively identified by Huang as the assailant, he was arrested with the aid of his wife and his home was searched. In addition to numerous stolen handbags, policemen also found a pile of women's clothing on the bed, hundreds of lingerie on the bedside table and the "models" he had been using the stolen items on. After further investigation and interrogations, Luo was officially charged with the 19 murders.

Soon after his arrest, Luo confessed to the crimes, giving detailed explanations of how, where and why he did it, with his guilt further reinforced by forensic and technical evidence that placed him at the crime scenes. He was tried and convicted for the murders on January 18, 1995, by the Guangzhou Intermediate People's Court, and subsequently shot two days later.

== In media and culture ==
The 1995 Hong Kong slasher film Diary of a Serial Killer (Chinese: 廣州殺人王之人皮日記), directed by Otto Chan, was based on Luo's murders.

== See also ==
- Copycat crime
- List of serial killers in China
