= Asghar the Murderer =

Iranian serial killer and rapist

- Born: Ali Asghar Borujerdi; 1893; Borujerd, Lorestan, Qajar Iran
- Died: 6 July 1934 (aged 40–41); Toopkhaneh, Tehran, Pahlavi Iran
- Other name: Asghar-e Qatil (Asghar the Murderer)
- Convictions: Murder and rape
- Penalty: Execution by hanging

Details
- Victims: 33 confirmed
- Country: Iran and Iraq
- Date apprehended: January 1934

Ali Asghar Borujerdi (Persian: علی‌اصغر بروجردی; 1893 – 6 July 1934), better known as Asghar the Murderer (اصغر قاتل, Asghar-e Ghatel), was the first Iranian serial killer and rapist reported in the 20th century.

Asghar was born in Iran and moved to Ottoman Iraq as a child with his family. He began assaulting, raping, and later murdering, adolescent boys in Baghdad when he was fourteen years old. Escaping back to Iran in 1933, he continued his murders for a year until he was arrested and executed. Asghar was convicted of raping and killing 33 young adults, eight in Iran and the rest in Baghdad.

== Early life ==
Ali Asghar Borujerdi was born in 1893 in Borujerd. He had 2 brothers named Reza and Taghi, and one sister. Asghar grew up in a family which had a history of various criminal activities, including theft, murder, and defamation. His grandfather, Zulfali, was a bandit who robbed caravans in the cities of Borujerd, Malayer, and Arak, sometimes murdering the caravans' owners.

Asghar's father, Ali Mirza, was also a known bandit, who had killed more than 40 civilians with his bare hands. His notoriety made him immigrate to Baghdad with his wife and children. On the way to Mashhad, Mirza was killed by the Persian Cossack Brigade in Iran, and his wife and children continued to Baghdad.

Asghar had heard from his mother that his father had been a soldier who was killed during his military conscription. The family soon travelled to Iraq under the pretext of making the Karbala pilgrimage, and subsequently decided to remain in Baghdad.

== Murders in Iraq ==
Asghar sold snacks to other children and adolescents, and made friends with them. He would promise to give them treats but instead, would assault and sexually molest them. It was during this time, when Asghar was age 14, that he was first arrested and prosecuted for his abuse of other children in Baghdad, and was imprisoned. Due to his young age, he was not considered a serious risk, was treated leniently and released with the consent of his victims' parents. He then returned to selling nuts and snacks. Soon, Asghar was again arrested and sentenced to a nine-year prison term, after it was discovered he had abused five children in Baghdad. At the age of 27, he was released and ordered to stay away from activities that could possibly land him in contact again with the police and the court. It was during this period that he killed 25 children and adolescents in Iraq, and even confessed to the last murder. He quickly fled to Iran where he settled permanently.

Asghar said the following about his crimes in Iraq:

"In Iraq, in my brother's cafeteria, I spent all the money. I was selling nuts for some time in the mosques, and I was in contact with children until I was imprisoned for nine years for abusing five of them. After my release, I was still around children until I deceived a carpenter's student named Hassan one night, raping him with five others, and because of this, I was detained for 2 years and supervised by the police. Every night, the police would come to my home and control my actions at home, so I decided to kill any boy I raped. I killed 25 children in Baghdad, often drowning them. Some resisted and since I was not going to leave any traces behind, the last kid I shot. Another child saw me and then I escaped to Iran."

== Murders in Iran ==
When Asghar returned to Iran, he did not return to his hometown of Borujerd. Instead, he settled in Tehran's Reza Khan Caravanserai, where he was particularly busy with athletics. In this way, he had frequent contact with children and adolescents. His main targets were male teens who had come to look for work. During this brief time, he killed eight people and dumped their bodies in the southern part of the city.

The discovery of the mutilated bodies of these adolescents in the furnaces and aqueducts near the Minudasht village became a source of fear in Tehran.

== Arrest ==
In January 1933, a teenager who was lost in the Qaleh Kharabeh village, 800 km south of Tehran, found the body of a boy. He rushed to tell the news in nearby Najafabad. Agents from the Office of Provincial Affairs discovered that, in addition to the teen's body, there were two others. Both were under twenty years old and had been killed in the past couple of weeks.

On 23 February, in the space of less than two months, another young man's skull was found at Laleh Park, but his body was not found. Five days later, a 31-year-old man's headless body was discovered in the Aminabad district of Dowlatabad.

By creating a climate of fear around Tehran, the police and the judiciary worked hard to find any clues which would help them find the killer. Sardar Timur Khan, an inspector from Tehran, who was probably the most knowledgeable officer in this area, was put in charge of the serial killings investigation in southern Tehran.

The police drained several wells in an attempt to either find more bodies or prevent their use for possible dumping, as the officers continued their efforts to solve the killings in Qarat.

On Thursday, 10 March 1933, close to Aminabad's qanats, the police came by a middle-aged man in the desert, selling a stack of porterage. The officers spoke with him, asking about his background and employment.

The man claimed he was selling okra. They did not doubt him at first, but upon closer inspection, noticed bloody clothes and a bloody knife. The man claimed to have bought the clothes from the market near the Shah-Abdol-Azim shrine, and the rest of the items were his tools. The authorities were not convinced, and the man was arrested and taken to a commissioner in Tehran.

The officers then visited Asghar's residence in Reza Khan Caravanserai and questioned his neighbours. They said that, the previous night, Asghar had introduced the murdered boys as being his brothers. The police identified the clothes worn as belonging to the same teenager.

== Trial and confessions ==
After a series of interrogations, Ali Asghar admitted the clothes were from the adolescent, also named Ali, whom Asghar employed to work alongside him. But after the boy ran away, Asghar found him and proceeded to rape and murder him. Eventually, Asghar confessed to raping and murdering a total of 8 children in Iran and 25 in Iraq.

Now dubbed "Asghar the Murderer", the trial began in June 1934. Asghar was charged with the rape and murder of a dozen children and adolescents. At the verdict, the court sentenced him to 9 years of imprisonment and subsequent to that - he was to be executed. The verdict was upheld by the Supreme Court of Iran.

Given a chance to speak, Asghar explained his reasoning behind the crimes:

"These are people without parents; they are useless and beautiful. When their facial hair starts to grow, they become thieves. I have enmity with them. These are the enemies of society. Because of that, I have killed them. I was so excited when outside of my country, as I have killed a lot of them. That's why I came here, seeing they were here, and kill them.

== Execution ==
On Wednesday, 6 July 1934, in the early morning, Asghar was executed in Toopkhaneh in front of the country's national justice system. At first, he appeared humorous, but when he saw the rope, he realised the inevitable and grew fearful. He said that if he was to be released, he would give the person two sheep. "I killed some tramps, I killed them because of you", he said after protesting.

In the story The Well of Babel by Reza Ghassemi, Asghar the Murderer says; "my purpose in life is to see my head over and above others. Well, now I'm dreaming of a cord climbing up." The prison director instructs that he is hanged by the feet, upside down and ties a rope around a large stone with the noose around his neck and leaves him hanging by the dangling stone.

== See also ==
- List of serial killers by country
- List of serial killers by number of victims
