= Oleg Kosarev =

Soviet-Russian serial rapist

- Born: Oleg Leonidovich Kosarev; 11 March 1966 (age 60); Moscow, RSFSR, USSR
- Children: 1
- Status: Convicted
- Criminal charges: Aggravated rape Child rape Sexual abuse Robbery
- Penalty: 20 years imprisonment

Details
- Victims: 40–140
- Country: Soviet Union, later Russia
- Date apprehended: 21 April 2011

Oleg Leonidovich Kosarev (born 11 March 1966), known as The Elevator Man, is a Soviet-Russian serial rapist, sex offender, child molester, pedophile and robber. He has been sentenced to long terms of imprisonment, the last one being in 2012. According to his own claims, during his criminal career he committed at least 140 rapes, of which more than 40 were proven in court.

== First crimes and imprisonment ==
A native Muscovite, in his own words, from the age of 7 to 12, Kosarev was subjected to depraved actions by another man who dressed him in women's clothing and used him for sexual games. The first rape he committed was at age 18, for which he was sent for involuntary commitment to the psychiatric hospital No. 5, known as "White Pillars", where he raped a nurse with an accomplice. In 1984, the Chekhov City Court declared Kosarev mentally competent to stand trial and sentenced him to eight years' imprisonment. Kosarev stated later that, in the penal colony, he was subjected to sexual violence. There, he was forcibly tattooed with a blossoming rose—the symbol for the opushchenny (Russian for "the lowered one"), the name of the lowest level in the social hierarchy of the prisoners.

== Release and crime spree ==
Kosarev was released in June 1992, and a month and a half later, he made another attack. He usually stalked his victims—teenage girls—on the street, and followed them into a building. Once in an elevator, he raped and robbed his victims, threatening them with a knife. To lull vigilant on-lookers, he pretended to be blind. Kosarev's criminal activity peaked in the fall of 1995 when up to three similar attacks on children occurred each day in the capital. In one case, the rapist found five children—two boys and three girls—in an elevator, where he raped all three girls, threatening them with a knife and forcing the boys to have sex with them. In another instance, he raped a young mother in front of a small child, forcing them to observe the entire process.

At the same time, Oleg Kosarev married through a newspaper ad and found work as a guard in a kindergarten. His wife at the time did not suspect him of any such crimes, and considered him to be a romantic, gallant man.

On 31 October 1995, Kosarev was detained on Arbat Street while trying to sell stolen goods, including a camera taken from one of the victims four hours before his arrest. His suspicious behaviour attracted the attention of authorities.

At first, Kosarev denied his guilt, but soon, after some confrontations with the victims, he confessed. Although he admitted to around 137 rapes, the court could only prove around 40 instances, as many of his victims refused to cooperate with the investigators. In March 1997, the court sentenced him to 15 years' imprisonment, of which 10 he served in a standard prison, and the other five in a maximum-security prison.

== Imprisonment, release and new crimes ==
In October 2010, Oleg Kosarev was granted parole, having served 12½ out of 15 years. During his stay at the Vladimir colony, he got married, meeting his future wife on a prison date. In 2002, a daughter was born from this relationship, but soon the spouse, after having discovered Oleg's crimes, left him.

Returning to Moscow, Kosarev, in less than six months, committed another crime. After he arrived in Serpukhov, he attacked a 13-year-old girl on Vesennyaya Street on 25 February 2011. Pretending to be blind, he followed the girl into an elevator, where, with the threat of a knife, he forced the girl to go to the last floor, where he raped her. After that, Kosarev forced the girl to drink the contents of a syringe that he had brought with him—a mixture of phenazepam and diphenhydramine—and drink it with vodka. As a result, the victim was hospitalized with serious poisoning.

The next attack occurred on the afternoon of 7 April, again in Serpukhov. In the area of house number 160, on Tsentralnaya Street, he noticed two girls (17 and 18, respectively), both 11th-grade students of the local high school. On Osenniy Street, he attacked them, overtaking them in the elevator. Kosarev inflicted at least three blows with the handle and blade of the knife on the head and hand of one girl, and the other—nine on the head, hand and body. After that, the offender took gold jewellery from his victims—a chain, rings with precious stones, a pendant and earrings, as well as two mobile phones, raping one of the girls again before finally fleeing the scene.

== Third arrest and sentence ==
When the search for the rapist in Serpukhov began, an investigator from the city's prosecutor's office appealed to the investigative department to inquire about a similar offender, active in Moscow in the mid-1990s. Investigators decided to check out the criminal, and on 21 April 2011, Oleg Kosarev was detained in Moscow. He immediately confessed to everything and returned all of the stolen items. At the trial, Kosarev was charged with violence against minors, robbery and rape. The defendant argued that "another person entered into him"; however, according to the results of a comprehensive forensic psychiatric examination, he was sane. On 18 October 2012, the Moscow Oblast Court sentenced Oleg Kosarev to 20 years' imprisonment, with the first 12 years to be spent in a standard, and the final eight in a corrective labour colony.

== Copycats ==
After Kosarev's capture in 1995, attacks with similar modus operandi continued to take place in Moscow, by a criminal named Valery Deyev. Deyev, born in 1969, dressed in a similar way as Kosarev and physically resembled him. In one case, he told the girl he had raped that he was Andrei Chikatilo. Even before Kosarev's capture, it was known that there were two different criminals, due to the fact that the rapes occurred simultaneously in different locations of the city. The police even suggested that the rapists could be twin brothers, and therefore sent inquiries to psychiatric hospitals to monitor any twin brothers with paraphilias, but the search yielded no result. Kosarev himself told that during one of his "hunts" for schoolgirls, he saw a man dressed similarly to him, tracking the same girl. That event took place on Chicherina Street.

Deyev was arrested on 29 May 1996. He was unmarried and had two criminal convictions for robberies and theft. While housed in the detention center "Matrosskaya Tishina", he tried to feign mental illness and attempted to cut open his veins twice. Despite this, Deyev was recognized as sane. He named about 50 addresses where he claimed to have committed rapes and robberies, only 23 of them were proven in court. Deyev was sentenced to 15 years' imprisonment.

In 2011, Deyev was released, married and, like Kosarev, immediately returned to his criminal activities. He invited teenage boys to his house, plied them with alcohol, and when they fell unconscious, committed sexual acts on them. In February 2016, Deyev, during a quarrel with a neighbour, grabbed a pistol and fired some blank cartridges at him. He was detained, after which details of the sexual assaults came to light. In 2017, Valery Deyev was sentenced by the court to 20 years' imprisonment in corrective labour colony.

In 1996, in Moscow, the third "elevator" rapist was arrested—Bunin, who had no resemblance to Kosarev and Deyev. He committed at least six attacks, was found not guilty by reason of insanity, and sent off to involuntary commitment.

== In popular culture ==
In 1998, an episode from the true crime TV-series "Criminal Russia" was filmed about both Kosarev's and Deyev's crimes, titled A Hunt for the Double.

== Bibliography ==
- S. M. Dyshev. Russian gangsters. From 'thieves in law' to 'scumbags'. — М.: Eksmo, 2001. — 432 p. — ISBN 5-04-001619-0.
