= 2001 Sacramento shootings =

Spree shooting in California, U.S.

2001 Sacramento shooting
- Location: Sacramento, California, U.S.
- Date: September 8–10, 2001
- Attack type: Spree killing; murder–suicide; Copycat crime
- Deaths: 6 (including the perpetrator)
- Injuries: 2
- Perpetrator: Joseph Ferguson
- Motive: Copycat crime; Homicidal ideation; Desire to become a deadly mass murderer

From September 8 to 10, 2001, 20-year-old Joseph Ferguson committed multiple shootings in Sacramento, California, killing five people and injuring two others before shooting and killing himself following a shootout with authorities on September 10.

== Background ==
Joseph Ferguson was born in September 1980 and was one of three sons of Susan and Thomas Ferguson. He grew up in south Sacramento. In December 1998, his parents divorced. In 1999, his mother was imprisoned for 14 years after a plea deal of no contest to charges of molesting Ferguson and one of his brothers when they were less than 14 years old. The third brother also reported his mother had molested him, but the statute of limitations had expired by the time she was charged.

Ferguson held a private security guard permit, which was issued in March 1999.

Ferguson commenced working for Burns International Security in 1999 but was suspended from his job on September 7, 2001, after his ex-girlfriend and fellow security guard, 20-year-old Nina Susu, reported that he had vandalized her car with an ax after she broke up with him earlier in the week. The company management, and Susu, contacted the FBI to warn of threats Ferguson had also made. Although a report was made and the Sacramento police were also contacted, no further action was taken at that time due to Ferguson's lack of a criminal record.

== Shootings ==
Late on September 8, 2001, Ferguson fatally shot two Burns Security guards at the city corporation yard; his first victim was Susu, his ex-girlfriend. Later that night, Ferguson shot and killed two more people at the Miller Park marina: a third Burns security guard, and a 19-year-old marina worker. Around midnight, Ferguson handcuffed an additional security guard to a tree and fled the scene. On September 9, Ferguson killed a fifth person at a home in Rancho Cordova's Lincoln Village neighborhood. The other victims were Burns security guards Marsha Jackson, 32, George Bernardino, 48 and Nikolay Popovich as well as dock worker John Glimstad, 19.

Early on September 10, Ferguson shot and injured an officer after exchanging fire with authorities at Folsom Boulevard and Zinfandel Drive, using a converted fully-automatic AK-47. During the exchange, a stray bullet struck a 27-year-old bystander in the abdomen, injuring him. Ferguson, who was unscathed from the exchange, shot and killed himself shortly after the shootout.

== Motive ==
A motive was found in the form of profanity laced videotape. He said he wanted to be a “Mass murderer” and “outdo Timothy McVeigh (one of the perpetrators of the Oklahoma City bombing) and Ukrainian immigrant, Nikolay Soltys.” The latter of whom, went on a mass stabbing spree in the same region as Ferguson, killing seven members of his family a month before. Reportedly, it was believed Soltys’ rampage motivated Ferguson to commit his murder spree.

== Aftermath ==
Ferguson and his shooting received short-lived coverage; the incident was quickly overshadowed by the September 11 attacks.
