= Loren Coleman =

American cryptozoologist (born 1947)

- Born: July 12, 1947 (age 79); Norfolk, Virginia, United States
- Education: Simmons University
- Writing career
- Years active: 1960–present
- Subjects: Cryptozoology, Forteana, folklore, psychology
- Notable work: Mysterious America; The Copycat Effect
- Website: www.lorencoleman.com

Loren Coleman (born July 12, 1947) is an American cryptozoologist, author and television personality who has written over 40 books on a number of topics, including cryptozoology. He is also the President, Founder and leading Director of the International Cryptozoology Museum in Portland, Maine. He has a background in social work and has also written on the topic of suicide, particularly the copycat effect.

== Early life ==
Coleman was born in Norfolk, Virginia, and grew up in Decatur, Illinois. He was the oldest of four children. His father was a firefighter and his mother a homemaker. He graduated in 1965 from MacArthur High School. He studied anthropology and zoology at Southern Illinois University at Carbondale. He earned his master's degree in social work from Simmons University, doing postgraduate work on sociology and anthropology at the University of New Hampshire and Brandeis University. He moved to Maine in 1980. One of the films that inspired him to pursue cryptozoology was the 1955 Japanese film, Half Human.

== Cryptozoology ==
Coleman writes on popular culture, animal mysteries, folklore, and cryptozoology. An editor of the Skeptical Inquirer said, "among monster hunters, Loren's one of the more reputable, but I'm not convinced that what cryptozoologists seek is actually out there". He has written articles and books on cryptozoology and other Fortean topics, and over 40 books on the subject. Coleman has carried out fieldwork throughout North America regarding sightings, trace evidence, and Native peoples' traditions of Sasquatch and other possible cryptids. He appeared on NPR to discuss the death of anthropologist and fellow cryptozoologist Grover Krantz.

Paraview Press introduced a series of books, "Loren Coleman Presents" in 2004. Coleman wrote introductions to volumes in the series. Coleman contributed to the exhibition "Cryptozoology: Out of Time Place Scale", shown at Bates College Museum of Art (June 24 - October 8, 2006) and at the H & R Block Artspace at the Kansas City Art Institute (October 28 - December 20, 2006). Coleman is also a contributor/coauthor of the 2006 Bates exhibition catalogue and book, Cryptozoology: Out of Time Place Scale. He also wrote the essay "Cryptids" for Alexis Rockman.

=== International Cryptozoology Museum ===
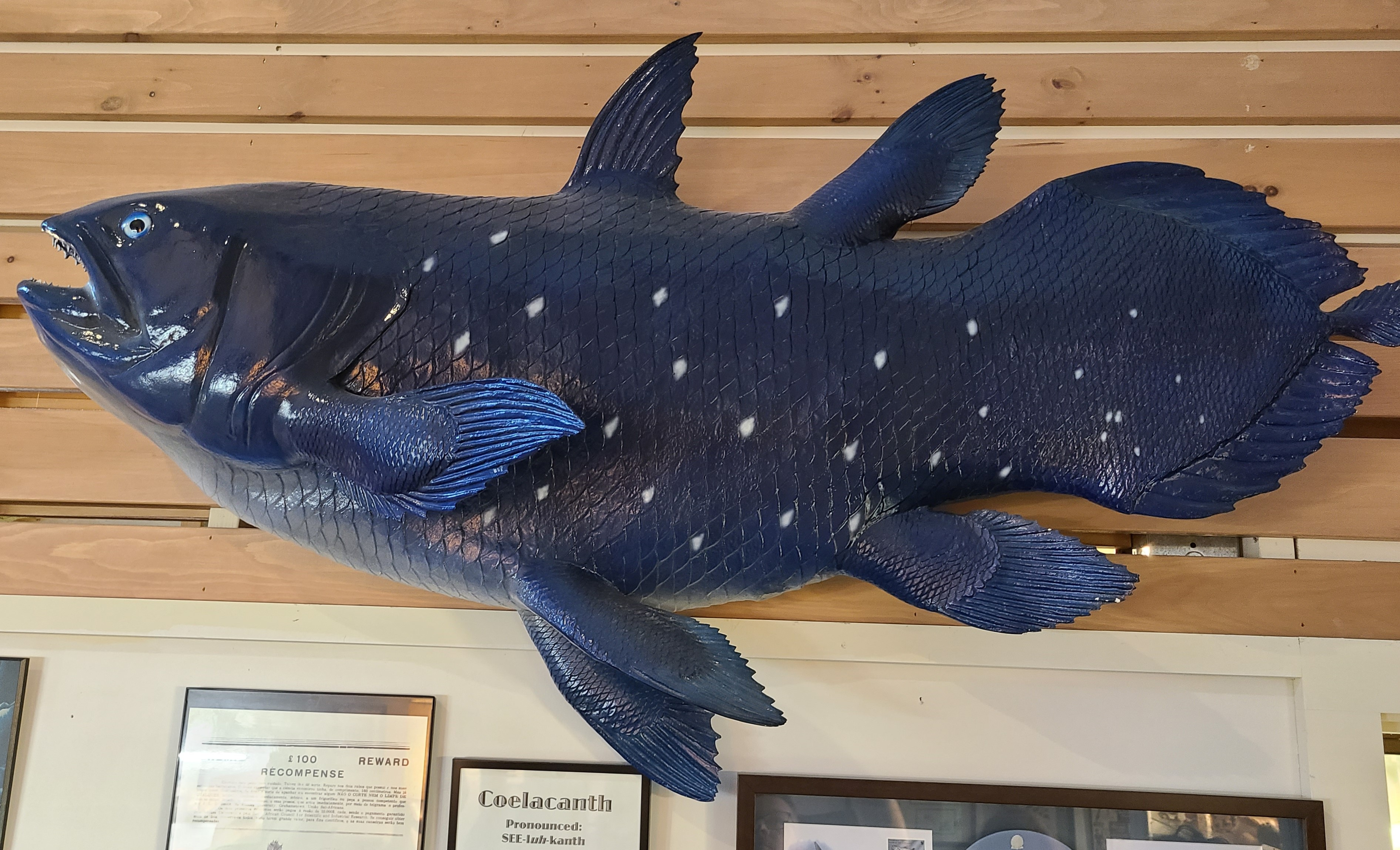
Coelacanth at the Cryptozoology Museum

Coleman established a Cryptozoology Museum in 2003 in Portland, Maine. The first downtown location for the museum opened in November 2009, occupying the rear of The Green Hand Bookshop, a Portland general used bookshop specializing in science fiction, fantasy, and other forms of Gothic fiction. On October 30, 2011, two years after moving onto Congress Street, it re-opened in a much larger space around the corner at 11 Avon Street, although it was still located in the Trelawny Building. The museum then moved again in the summer of 2016, opening in July on Thompson's Point. In 2022, Coleman announced plans to move the museum to Bangor, Maine, and in 2023 he purchased a building on Broadway for that purpose. The Streamline Moderne building is notable for being on the National Register of Historic Places. Initially, the plan was to move the museum to Bangor in 2024, but lack of funding delayed the move until April 2026, with the new Bangor location finally opening on June 1, 2026.

=== Criticism ===
Justin Mullis criticized Coleman's assumption about a 1955 incident in which an Indiana woman was pulled underwater by something she did not see. Coleman claimed it was caused by a half human, half fish creature called a "merbeing". Mullis pointed to Coleman's reference to Creature from the Black Lagoon as an example of "how cryptozoologists think about science fiction and its relationship to the natural world".

Coleman has clearly used a scene from the film to prematurely solve an unexplained event, ignoring more plausible explanations, such as the possibility that Mrs. Johnson was attacked by a large fish or turtle or caught her leg on a submerged log. He also ignores the fact that Johnson’s story appeared at the same time the Black Lagoon trilogy of films was being released in theaters.

Science writer Sharon A. Hill disagrees with Coleman's assertions that cryptozoology is "scientific and skeptically minded". Hill criticized Coleman's Cryptomundo website, saying that members "show blatant disdain for scientists and investigators critical of their claims". In reviewing a book by Grover Krantz, Skeptical Inquirer editor Robert Boston said of Coleman and Jerome Clark's book Creatures of the Outer Edge, "Clark and Coleman are every bit as gullible as Krantz, but at least they know how to spin a monster yarn so that the reader gets an occasional chill".

== Suicide prevention ==
Coleman has a master's degree in psychiatric social work and was a consultant for the Maine Youth Suicide Program for nearly a decade. He has lectured often on the impact of the media on suicide and murder. He has specialized in the Werther effect, a phenomenon resulting in many copycat suicides following the publication of a 1774 novel. He has been called on for statements in the aftermath of school shootings and how best to respond to the problem. A specific concern continues to be cases of murder-suicide among the young as well as the possibility of clusters (e.g., teen suicides, school shootings, workplace violence, and domestic terrorism) and the influence of media coverage, leading to his writing the books Suicide Clusters and The Copycat Effect.

== Personal life ==
He is married and has two children.

== Bibliography ==
- The Field Guide to Bigfoot and Other Mystery Primates (NY: Anomalist Books, 2006, ISBN 1-933665-12-2)
- The Unidentified & Creatures of the Outer Edge: The Early Works of Jerome Clark and Loren Coleman (NY: Anomalist Books, 2006, ISBN 1-933665-11-4)
- Weird Ohio with James Willis and Andrew Henderson (New York: Barnes and Noble, 2005, ISBN 1-4027-3382-8)
- The Copycat Effect (New York: Paraview Pocket-Simon & Schuster, 2004, ISBN 0-7434-8223-9)
- The Field Guide to Lake Monsters, Sea Serpents and Other Mystery Denizens of the Deep with Patrick Huyghe (NY: Tarcher-Penguin, 2003, ISBN 1-58542-252-5)
- BIGFOOT!: The True Story of Apes in America (NY: Paraview Pocket-Simon & Schuster, 2003, ISBN 0-7434-6975-5)
- Tom Slick: True Life Encounters in Cryptozoology (Fresno: Craven Street/Linden Press, 2002, ISBN 0-941936-74-0)
- Mothman and Other Curious Encounters (NY: Paraview, 2002, ISBN 1-931044-34-1)
- Mysterious America: The Revised Edition (NY: Paraview, 2001, ISBN 1-931044-05-8) HB 2004 (ISBN 1-931044-84-8).
- Cryptozoology A to Z: The Encyclopedia of Loch Monsters, Sasquatch, Chupacabras, and Other Authentic Mysteries of Nature with Jerome Clark (NY: Simon & Schuster, 1999, ISBN 0-684-85602-6)
- The Field Guide to Bigfoot, Yeti and Other Mystery Primates Worldwide with Patrick Huyghe (NY: HarperCollins, 1999, ISBN 0-380-80263-5)
- Suicide Clusters (Boston: Faber & Faber, 1987, ISBN 9780571129836)
- Curious Encounters: Phantom Trains, Spooky Spots, and Other Mysterious Wonders (Boston: Faber & Faber, 1985, ISBN 978-0-571-12542-5)
