= Lam Kwok-wai =

Hong Kong serial killer

- Born: 27 January 1971 (age 55); British Hong Kong
- Other name: The Tuen Mun Rapist
- Convictions: Murder (3 counts); Robbery (7 counts); Rape (8 counts)
- Penalty: Life imprisonment (x11)

Details
- Victims: 3 murders
- Date apprehended: 9 August 1993

Lam Kwok-wai (simplified Chinese: 林国伟; traditional Chinese: 林國偉; pinyin: Lín Guówěi, born 27 January 1971) is a Hong Kong serial killer.

He was convicted of 10 rapes and three murders. His murder weapons were his bare hands; he referred to his right hand as his "fork". He was given 11 life sentences.

== Early life ==
Lam Kwok-wai grew up in Hong Kong's Tuen Mun area. Truancy and juvenile crime were high, various narcotics were widespread, and the Sun Yee On triad had a powerful grip over the area. He was raised with his father, stepmother, and four siblings in a 450-square-foot apartment in the Tai Hing House. His biological mother had left when he was three to live with another man. After years of juvenile delinquency and poor performance in school, Lam decided to drop out permanently at age 15. He spent a brief two-month sentence in a detention centre at age 15. After the age of 18, he tried countless drugs, drank every day, and finally found enjoyment in illegal road-racing.

== Crimes ==
- His first rape occurred on 24 April 1992. Lam had been drinking heavily when he decided to follow the 19-year-old girl from her taxi and into the elevator of Oi Ming house. The number of rapes committed in Tuen Mun was double the number that were committed elsewhere in Hong Kong, so this girl's rape was no big news.
- Two months later he committed his second rape. Lam followed a 32-year-old waitress home from Wan Chai's Club Versailles at 4:30 a.m.
- Two months later, the third rape occurred. This time it was a 39-year-old woman at 4:00 a.m.
- In another two months, he followed a 32-year-old woman into the elevator of Hing Ping House at 11:30 p.m.
- The next month he raped another 32-year-old woman, 25 days after that he raped a 28-year-old woman. She spent three days recovering in the hospital.

Though rape was common in Tuen Mun, such regularity was not. Therefore, the public and the press were in a state of panic, fearing the serial rapist on the loose.

50-year-old Li Hing was his first murder. She was a Yaohan department store assistant who was returning home from a mahjong game at 4:00 a.m. when she entered the elevator in the Yau Oi estate, where Lam followed her in. He raped and sodomized Li Hing after he killed her.

In 1992, there had been seven murders and 16 reported rapes in Tuen Mun, but Sik Moh (Sex Devil) was the main focus of the authorities. Marches and demonstrations were coordinated even though the six women who had been raped were ignored, and up to 20 people had stepped over Li Hing's body on the way to work before her murder was finally reported.

The police eventually employed the MIIDASS (Major Incident Investigation and Disaster Support System) computer which had been used in the hunt for the Yorkshire Ripper. Everyone convicted of wife battery, assault and sexual assault was investigated. Lam, however, who still lived at home and had no prior sexual offences, remained off of the police's radar.

On 14 April 1993, Lam committed his second murder. 22-year-old Mak Siu-han was a DJ returning home from a gig at the New World Hotel's Catwalk Disco at 5:00 a.m. She was found dead and sexually assaulted between the fifth and sixth floors of Hing Shing House where she lived at 7:45 a.m. Police estimated that up to 40 people may have stepped over her body before her death was reported.

The next night, more than 200 Tuen Mun residents protested in the streets against inadequate policing. Lam decided that "the heat was too much" and fled to stay with his elder sister in Hunghom. This is where he committed his final murder, that of 23-year-old Lau Sui-man, a karaoke PR hostess on 11 July 1993.

On 8 August 1993, just after 1:30 a.m., Lam attacked and raped a 21-year-old woman in Hunghom's Mei King Street. While attacking her, he began to chat. They shared a cigarette, and Lam asked her to be his girlfriend. They arranged a date for the next evening at the UA Whampoa cinema. When she got home, the girl told her mother-in-law what had happened, but her mother-in-law told her to forget about it. The next afternoon, she told her brother, a Correctional Services officer, who took her to the police to make a report. The police set up an operation to accompany the girl to the meeting place at the cinema to arrest the man. However, when Lam showed up, the police weren't paying attention so it was left to the girl's brother to tackle Lam.

Lam was obsessed with the murder weapon - his own hands. He had given his hand a nickname, his "fork." He spent a great deal of time staring at his "fork" during his trial. At the Siu Lam psychiatric centre he tried to use the murder weapon on himself, forgetting that it was attached to him.

== Trial and judgement ==
Lam Kwok-wai faced 18 charges, seven of robbery, eight of rape, and three of murder. All charges were committed during the course of the ten attacks perpetrated on women in the Tuen Mun and Hung Hom areas between 24 April 1992 and 4 August 1995.

Lam pled guilty to the robbery and the rape counts and was found guilty after trial on the three murder counts. Mandatory sentences of life imprisonment were imposed on each of the murder counts.

Through the appeal, Dr. Connell claimed that Lam fit the criteria for a diagnosis of diminished responsibility due to his long-standing and consistent pattern of irresponsibility that was made worse by drinking too much, and that he would have had difficulty controlling his impulses and his aggression. In the end, the appeal was refused and the sentence was upheld.

== Victims (murders only) ==
- Li Hing, female, age 50, body found in the Yau Oi Estate, Tuen Mun
- Mak Siu-han, female, age 22, body found in Hing Shing House, Tuen Mun
- Lau Siu-man (刘小敏), female, age 23, body found in Hung Hom

== Popular culture ==
- Lam Kwok-wai is portrayed in the movie Tun Men se mo (The Rapist) (1994).

== See also ==
- List of serial killers by country
