= Qaleh Kharabeh, Fars =

Qaleh Kharabeh قلعه خرابه
- Village
- Location within Iran
- Coordinates: 30°10′42″N 52°03′49″E
- Country: Iran
- Province: Fars
- County: Sepidan
- Bakhsh: Hamaijan
- Rural District: Hamaijan

Population (2006)
  - Total: 245
- Time zone: UTC+3:30 (IRST)
  - Summer (DST): UTC+4:30 (IRDT)

Qaleh Kharabeh (Persian: قلعه خرابه, also Romanized as Qal‘eh Kharābeh; also known as Deh Kharābeh) is a village in Hamaijan Rural District, Hamaijan District, Sepidan County, Fars province, Iran. At the 2006 census, its population was 245, in 54 families.
