= Prison social hierarchy =

Social status of prisoners within a correctional facility

Prison social hierarchy refers to the social status of prisoners within a correctional facility, and how that status is used to exert power over other inmates. A prisoner's place in the hierarchy is determined by a wide array of factors including previous crimes, access to contraband, affiliation with prison gangs, and physical or sexual domination of other prisoners. People convicted of sex crimes, including child sexual abuse, are considered low in the hierarchy and are often the victims of extreme violence in prisons.
