= Yevhenii Balan =

Ukrainian serial killer (born 1967)

- Born: 1967 (age 58–59); Boiarka, Kyiv Oblast, Ukrainian SSR
- Other name: "The Fastiv Maniac"
- Convictions: Ukraine: Murder x9 Rape x3 Russia: Rape
- Penalty: Ukraine: Life imprisonment Russia: 8 years

Details
- Victims: 9
- Span of crimes: 2006–2011
- Country: Ukraine
- State: Kyiv
- Date apprehended: September 21, 2011

Yevhenii Balan (Ukrainian: Євгеній Балан; born 1967), known as The Fastiv Maniac (Ukrainian: Фастівський маніяк), is a Ukrainian serial killer and rapist who murdered nine people, including male acquaintances and his stepdaughter, from 2006 to 2011 in Fastiv and the surrounding area. Arrested by a passer-by for an attempted murder and rape, he soon confessed to his other crimes, after which he was tried, convicted and sentenced to life imprisonment.

== Early life and first crime ==
Little is known of Yevhenii Balan's early life. Born in 1967 in Boiarka, at some point in his life he went to the Komi ASSR in the Russian SSR, where he was convicted of rape and sentenced to 8 years imprisonment. His time in prison affected him mentally, with Balan deciding that if he were to continue raping, he would not leave his victims alive.

=== Release and move to Fastiv ===
After serving out his sentence in full, Balan returned to Ukraine, initially settling in Volytsya and then Fastiv, where he entered into a common-law marriage with Nataliya Kornienko, a housekeeper whom his mother had hired to help around the house. He eventually moved in with Kornienko, who lived with her 16-year-old daughter Svitlana Strizh.

Kornienko would later claim in the first three months of their relationship, Balan managed to get a job at a sawmill and helped with housework, but would unexpectedly quit for no apparent reason. He refused to seek employment and lived off his partner's wage, which he would spend on alcohol and cigarettes. Kornienko also claimed that Balan did not get along with her daughter, and that he would sometimes lock himself in a closet for upwards of an hour, apparently just sitting and staring at a photograph of Strizh. His behaviour would get progressively worse, as he began molesting Strizh and verbally abusing Kornienko during his drunken stupors, but always convinced them that he was remorseful and that he had no idea what he was doing while in a drunken state.

== Murders ==
Balan's first murder occurred in January 2006, while he was still living in Volytsya. He strangled a male drinking companion and hid his body in a drainage pipe, where it was discovered in April - however, due to advanced decomposition, authorities were unable to establish a cause of death.

In the summer of 2009, Balan visited Volytsya again to meet up with a 45-year-old female acquaintance. He would later claim that the pair were in an intimate relationship, but as he was afraid she would reveal this to Kornienko, he instead raped and smothered the woman with a pillow.

On July 7, 2010, Balan was loitering around a forest in Kaznivkii when he encountered 58-year-old Viorika Rachkova, who had gone there to pick mushrooms for her husband Nikolay Korolenko, who had recently broken his leg. He accosted, raped and strangled Rachkova, before leaving her body to rot in the nearby shrubbery. After she failed to return home that evening, her husband, supporting himself with crutches, went searching for her, but was unable to find Rachkova. Several subsequent searches failed to find any trace of her, leading some to believe that she may have been killed.

On October 1, 17-year-old student Olena Nesterenko left her house in Kaznivkii without taking any money or personal belongings, likely because she planned to visit a friend. On the way, she was ambushed in a secluded area by Balan, who proceeded to rape and strangle her to death. Nesterenko's relatives later reported her missing to the police, but local authorities were unable to find any trace of her.

On August 29, Balan's stepdaughter Svitlana Strizh returned home in Fastiv from a visit to her aunt in Hatne, unaware that her stepfather was stalking her. When she approached the Krasny Oktyabr power plant, Strizh tried to call her mother to tell her that she was coming home - at that time, Balan grabbed her and dragged her to the bushes, where he raped and strangled Strizh. After throwing some dirt and leaves on top of the corpse, he calmly returned home to the worried Kornienko, suggesting that the teen may have simply gone somewhere else without telling her.

On September 12, Balan and Kornienko visited the latter's godfather in a village near Fastiv, where they spent the whole night drinking and enjoying the festivities. In the middle of the night, the drunken Balan snuck out of the house and got into an argument with 25-year-old local resident Ruslan Rudenko, whom he proceeded to stab to death with a kitchen knife he carried in one of his pockets. Rudenko's body was found on the following day, but local police were unable to identify a suspect in the case at the time.

On October 17, Balan headed out to vote in the local district council elections when he came across 43-year-old Tatyana Luksts. He invited her on a walk and to have a drink in the forest, but when he asked to have sex with her, she rebuked him. Angered, Balan raped and strangled the woman, then threw her body into a small hole underneath a tree and sprinkled it with leaves. Luksts' family attempted to convince local authorities to look for her, but they were initially apprehensive about doing so. In January of the following year, a local woman walking on the street noticed that some dogs were fighting over something - upon closer inspection, she saw that it was a human head. The woman reported it to the police, and after a search, officers eventually located a pair of severed legs. It was ascertained that these belonged to Luksts' corpse, which by that time had been ravaged by stray dogs.

=== Panic, rapes, and final murder ===
The recent disappearances and the discovery of Luksts' remains caused panic around the Fastiv Raion, with many residents fearing that a serial killer was active in the area. Authorities initially dismissed this notion, claiming that there was no conclusive evidence that this was the case and that Luksts' cause of death was still under investigation. Out of desperation, family members of the missing women contacted self-proclaimed psychics to help locate them, while Nikolay Korolenko threatened to find his wife's murderer and kill him himself if the police did not do anything.

Through the following year, there were at least three rapes that were reported in the Fastiv area, all of which were later linked to Balan. The first of these occurred sometime during the spring when he attacked a 48-year-old woman in the forest and choked her into unconsciousness - likely believing she had died, Balan left soon afterwards. Later on in the summer, he robbed and raped an 18-year-old girl near the Krasny Oktyabr power plant, but left her alive for unknown reasons. Balan also raped a 60-year-old woman, but little information is available on this case.

On August 15, Kornienko was unexpectedly visited by her landlord, 56-year-old Valery Korunchuk, who told her that he had gotten into a bitter argument with his wife back in Kyiv and needed a place to stay. Balan and Korunchuk would frequently bicker and drink over the next couple of days, until one day they both went to the nearby forest in Kaznivkii. Once there, Balan beat him with a stick and then stabbed him numerous times with his knife, then completely undressed Korunchuk and laid out his belongings on a nearby stump. The man's naked body was found not long after, but as he had no close relatives, he was not reported missing and was listed as a John Doe for approximately two months.

== Arrest, trial, and imprisonment ==
On September 22, Balan confronted another young girl near the Krasny Oktyabr power plant, whom he proceeded to beat. However, before he could start raping her, he was noticed by 26-year-old Maksym Postnov, a boxer who was returning to his home with his girlfriend. Upon seeing him, Balan rushed at the man, but Postnov knocked him to the ground and held him down until law enforcement officers arrived to deescalate the situation.

After realizing that Balan likely intended to rape the girl, the officers allowed Postnov and his girlfriend to go without pressing any charges, while Balan was booked on attempted murder and rape charges. While he initially claimed that he did not remember anything due to his drunken state, he eventually started confessing to all of his rapes and murders. Investigators were initially sceptical, but when they took him out of the station to show the crime scenes, Balan pointed out the locations of the bodies and described the murders in great detail. When questioned as to why he did it, he claimed that he felt a rush of adrenaline during the crimes, as if he was "taking the soul" of his victims. At least one article claimed that he wanted to surpass Anatoly Onoprienko, another Ukrainian serial killer who killed a total of 52 people.

In total, Balan confessed to three rapes and to nine total murders, but little information has been released about his ninth victim. During the duration of the trial, he expressed no remorse for his crimes and appeared to be indifferent towards the proceedings. In the end, Balan was found guilty on all counts and sentenced to life imprisonment.

== See also ==
- List of serial killers by country
