= Almería Ripper =

Unidentified Spanish serial killer

The Almería Ripper
- Other names: "The Barranco Killer" "The Zapillo Psychopath"

Details
- Victims: 5–10+ (sources on confirmed victims vary)
- Span of crimes: 1989 – 1995 (confirmed)
- Country: Spain
- State: Andalusia

The Almería Ripper (Spanish: El Destripador de Almería) is the name given to an unidentified Spanish serial killer who is thought to be responsible for at least five to ten murders of prostitutes around the municipality of Almería from 1989 to 1995.

His nickname derives from the belief that he was a copycat of Jack the Ripper. Similarly to him, the Almería Ripper was never caught and nobody has ever been charged with the murders associated with him.

== Murders ==
=== Modus operandi ===
As victims, the Ripper targeted young prostitutes he found on the streets of Almería, whom he later murdered by strangulation or blunt force trauma. Once dead, he moved the bodies from the crime scene to remote locations, often leaving the victims' bras or shoes behind. Most of them resembled each other, as they were short and had dark, curly hair. Notably, all the victims either had darker complexions or were part of minority backgrounds.

The women were usually found face up, with some showing signs of sexual violence. Their clothes were usually red or black, led some investigators that this might have been a factor why the Ripper chose them.

=== Victims ===
On 6 August 1989, a shepherd found the lifeless body of 24-year-old María del Carmen Heredia Alameda on the side of the N-342 highway near Vélez-Rubio. It was initially suspected that she died of a drug overdose, but an autopsy concluded that she was actually strangled to death.

On 28 August, the body of 24-year-old Carmen Dolores Sandmeyer was found on the cliffs of Cañarete, near Aguadulce, by a newlywed French couple. (Note: Also referred to as María del Carmen Sandmeyer Ramón, the daughter of a German drug trafficker named Peter Sandmeyer. Some sources also say that she was 20, not 24, at the time of her death.) Like Heredia before her, she also had bruises on her neck. The discovery of her body led to panic among other prostitutes, many of whom decided to flee the area or to take precautionary measures when visiting johns.

On 21 October, a shepherd named Ángel Machado Sánchez was attempting find somebody to sell scrap metal to in an area known as Las Terras de la Campana, approximately four kilometers away from Purchena. While wandering around, he noticed a large plastic bag that had human feet protruding from it. He reported the finding to the police, who noted that the body inside was that of a young woman aged 25 to 30 years old, and had likely died a month or two months prior. She was wearing a blouse, corduroy trousers, and red shoes, with the circumstances suggesting that she had been murdered. However, her case was closed soon after the discovery because her body disappeared – allegedly, she was buried near a dry riverbed that was later washed away by flash floods. Due to this, she was never positively identified.

At first, the local police dismissed any connection between the three murders – instead, they asserted they were the result of human trafficking or disputes. In 1990, a group of construction workers found the naked body of 28-year-old María "Tamara" Jesús Muñoz in Almerimar, with an autopsy concluding that she had been thrown from a height of more than forty meters. At around this time, the perpetrator was given the nickname "The Zapillo Psychopath", and police started investigating the police that it was a serial killer, launching "Opearation Indalo" in an attempt to catch him. According to an identikit, he was believed to be a white man of stocky build; between 30 and 45 years old, and possibly married.

On 6 October 1991, two farmers found the decomposing body of a young woman in Punta Etinas, near the municipality of Roquetas de Mar. She had been killed by a blow to the temple from a blunt object and was wearing only a red bra. At different points, investigators speculated that two different missing women were this victim – 27-year-old British nurse Alexandra Lily Lye, missing since 30 August 1991; and 23-year-old Isabel Nieto Rubio, who had gone missing on 2 March 1990. Both possibilities were ruled out – Lye's body was identified in November of that year and two people, English national Ian Welch and his Spanish wife Sonia Gil, were held for her murder, but released six months later due to a lack of evidence. Nieto remains listed as a missing person.

On 25 January 1993, the naked body of 25-year-old María Leal was found on a beach near Aguadulce by a German tourist. Like the previous victims, she had been strangled to death. At the time of her death, she was pregnant with a girl and was last seen getting into a dark blue car with a dented rear spoiler in the early hours of the morning. The owner of the car was never arrested, as there was a lack of evidence linking him to the death.

On 5 July, a gardener in El Ejido came across the body of 25-year-old Khadija "La Katty" Monsar, a Moroccan prostitute who worked at the Pampanico Hotel, in the Cuatro Vientos area. She was also found naked and strangled.

On 2 August 1994, the body of 22-year-old Nadia Hach Amar, a Dutch prostitute of Moroccan descent, was found behind a soccer field in the Los Ángeles neighborhood of Almería.

The final two victims were killed in 1995. The first was 24-year-old Aurora Amador, who was found strangled and with a blow to the head in a sinkhole nested between Aguadulce and Almería. After interviewing other prostitutes, authorities learned that Amador was last seen getting into a metallic gray Opel Corsa in Nicolás Salmerón Park, whose license plate ended with "5AB". The vehicle was traced to a prison guard stationed in Granada who had previously been reported to his superiors for sexual assault, but was never prosecuted. The man was questioned for five of the deaths, but due to a lack of conclusive evidence and pressure from Madrid to focus on other cases, he was never charged.

The final victim is believed to be 40-year-old Mónica García, a native of Barcelona whose face and skull were smashed in with a rock.

== Suspects and current status ==
To date, nobody has been arrested for any of the murders associated with the Almería Ripper. Several men were questioned throughout the 1990s, although none were prosecuted. Few leads or tips were gathered at the time due to the fact that a majority of the mainstream media seemingly ignored the murders, with the exception of local newspaper El Caso.

In 2006, there was speculation about the possible involvement of Volker Eckert, a German truck driver who confessed to killing prostitutes in several European countries, including three in Spain. However, he was eventually ruled out due to a lack of evidence linking him to any of the crimes and the fact that he was imprisoned for the majority of the killings.

== In the media and culture ==
In July 2024, it was announced that Lluís Quílez and Fernando Navarro were directing and writing a film focused on the Almería Ripper case. Titled Lo que los ojos esconden (English: What The Eyes Can't Hide), it will be a thriller inspired by David Fincher's Zodiac. It is currently still under development with no set release date.

== See also ==
- List of serial killers by country
