= Vladimir Ionesyan =

Soviet spree killer (1937–1964)

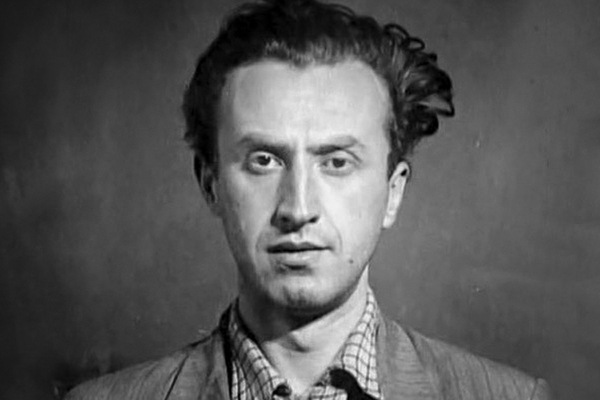
- Born: Vladimir Mihajlovich Ionesyan; 27 August 1937; Tbilisi, RSFSR
- Died: 1 February 1964 (aged 26); Butyrka Prison RSFSR
- Cause of death: Execution by shooting
- Other name: "Mosgas"
- Penalty: Death

Details
- Victims: 5
- Span of crimes: 1963–1964
- Country: Soviet Union
- States: Moscow, Ivanovo
- Date apprehended: 12 January 1964

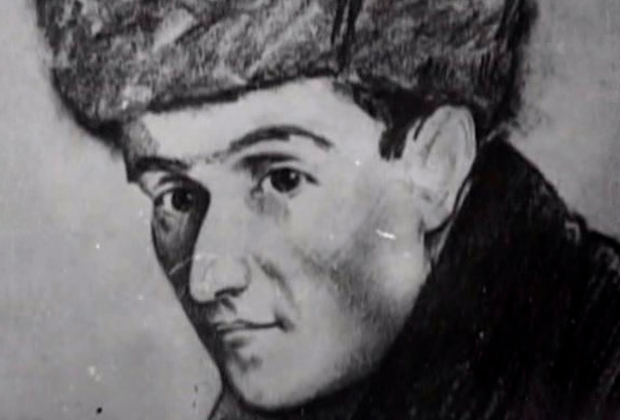
Vladimir Ionesyan

Vladimir Mihajlovich Ionesyan (27 August 1937 – 1 February 1964) was a Soviet spree killer. His nickname was "Mosgas," as Ionesyan broke into apartments pretending to be an employee of that company.

== Early biography ==
Ionesyan was born on 27 August 1937, in Tbilisi to a family of ethnic Armenians. As a child, he sang well, and his parents actively encouraged the development of his vocal capabilities. In addition to secondary education, Ionesyan had a diploma from music school, thanks to which he, as a good student, was accepted into the Tbilisi State Conservatoire. In the second year of the conservatoire, he went to work in the theatre, where he worked until 13 December 1963.

Details of Ionesyan's biography differ in various sources. According to one version, when Ionesyan was still in school, his father was sentenced to seven years for trading fraud, which is why, presumably, Vladimir went along the crooked path, which led him to the fact that in 1954, after graduating from high school, Ionesyan was caught for theft and sentenced to 5 years conditional imprisonment. In 1959 he was drafted into the army, as he while studying at the university, had to give up training because of, as he said at the interrogation, "a purely nervous illness". When he came to the military registration and enlistment office for an examination, he was sent for examination to the first hospital in Tbilisi, where doctors gave a conclusion that he could not serve. He brought the documents to the military enlistment office, where a certain person, he said, destroyed them, as he was attracted to Ionesyan and did not want him to evade military service. Vladimir was sentenced to two and a half years in prison. At the trial, he tried to prove his innocence, but for some reason, the person who destroyed his certificates did not call the court.

According to another version of the biography, Ionesyan received the first term for evading military service after school (in which his parents actively helped), because he believed that the service in the army would ruin his vocal talent, and this period was the same for two years. While he was serving his term, his father was arrested.

There is also a third version of Ionesyan's biography, set forth in the "Komsomolskaya Pravda", which brought excerpts from the records of his interrogation. According to these records, he received his first term for evading military service in 1959; on the criminal record from 1954, there was no such thing.

After the trial, Ionesyan was sent to a facilitated camp in Gori. There he behaved well and even worked as a cultivator, because of which he was sometimes released into the city. During one dismissal, Ionesyan did not return to the camp, because, unable to restrain himself nervously, he went home. After that, his imprisonment was replaced by one year of forced labour and soon was released. After liberation, Ionesyan was again drafted into the army and again sent to the central neurological dispensary, where he was told he could not serve due to his nervousness. After that, he finally received a military ticket.

After a while, he married a graduate of the Tbilisi Conservatoire named Medea, and had a son with her. Having failed to find a well-paid job, he decided to engage in group theft and was arrested. This time, the court, given his age and marital status, gave him 5 years of a suspended sentence. At the request of his wife, who wanted to protect him from communicating with friends and associates, Ionesyan moved to Orenburg, where he began working as a tenor (according to another source - a concertmaster) in the local Musical Comedy Theater. In November 1963, the theatre troupe from Kazan came to work with a certain artist along with his wife, who, in turn, was a ballerina named Alevtina Nikolaevna Dmitrieva (b. 1942). The spouse and Dmitrieva settled near the Ionesyan family, and Vladimir and Alevtina soon began a romance. However, the theatre management was unhappy with Dmitrieva's work, she was told that she was not suitable for the theatre and still had to learn how to dance. As Ionesyan explained during the interrogation, for her, this was a serious blow, with Vladimir deciding to help her, as he put it, "a very good person in every sense" and offered her to go with him to Ivanovo, where he had a friend who was a former director of the Orenburg operetta.

For the sake of Dmitrieva, Ionesyan decided to abandon his family and leave the workplace without a remand. Since Dmitrieva was not very interested in him, he lied that he worked for the KGB and, with the help of connections, managed to get a job at the Bolshoi Theatre. It did not work out for the lovers in Ivanovo, and Vladimir began to persuade Alevtina to go to Moscow, telling her that he had an inheritance there, which was left to him from a deceased uncle who lived in Germany. In Moscow, they rented an apartment on Meshchanskaya Street near the Rizhsky railway station from a pensioner, whom they in the first hours of their arrival in the capital. However, there was not enough money to live - Dmitrieva was not taken by any of the capital's theaters - and Ionesyan decided to get money from robberies. He again lied to Alevtina that he had received a promotion and would often be forced to leave for "assignments". The fact that the "KGB agent" wore very modest clothes, Ionesyan explained to her that he was "undercover" and should not stand out.

=== Motives ===
As the authorities rushed with the execution, Ionesyan's motives were not set in detail. Officially, the motive in the case was theft, which did not quite fit with Ionesyan's actions, since in half of the cases he did not take really valuable things lying in view and instead took a different trifle, which, in his opinion, could please Dmitrieva, and then gave them to her. Ionesyan's biographers do not have information about a difficult childhood, and, presumably, a detailed study of Ionesyan's childhood to find any factors that could explain his future crimes. During the interrogation, Ionesyan claimed that he was simply looking for money. For the first murder, he was motivated by the fact that due to a lack of money, he was in a neuro-stressful state, but could not explain the reasons for subsequent murders.

Researchers in the field of criminology, in particular the well-known anthropologist and sculptor Mikhail Gerasimov, came to the conclusion that Ionesyan belonged to the hysteroid type and that he committed the crimes for self-affirmation, as he wanted to achieve universal recognition. This is supported by the fact that in the Orenburg Musical Comedy Theater Ionesyan, despite his vocal education, played second-class roles, but believed he deserved more. This was the main reason that in 1963 he moved to Moscow - to prove that he deserved better.

There is also an opinion that Ionesyan was not a spree killer, for which the killing and suffering of the victims should be the main goal of the crimes, and the robbery, which was his main motive, and he only killed to eliminate witnesses.

== Murders ==
Ionesyan never planned his crimes beforehand. Pretending to be a controller from Mosgaz or an employee of ZhEkA No. 13, he went to apartments, took reading from meters and checked gas burners. While choosing the place of the future robbery, he was guided not so much by the rich decoration of the apartment, but by the number of people in it. As a weapon he used a tourist hatchet, bought from GUM. Outstretched outer detail was the ushanka, which Ionesyan, unlike the overwhelming number of Muscovites, tied at the back of the head, and not on the top, which immediately gave investigators a tip to the fact that the killer was a non-resident. Nevertheless, there are cases when Ionesyan put on a kepi instead of an ushanka.

=== The first victim ===
Ionesyan committed the first murder on 20 December 1963, in apartment No. 95 on the fourth floor on Baltiskaya Street in the Sokol District. Under the guise of a Mosgaz employee, he walked through several apartments at a time, where he inspected for a convenient victim under the pretext of a preventative inspection of gas equipment. That convenient victim was 12-year-old Konstantin Sobolev. After making sure that there was no one at home, Ionesyan inflicted a large number of blows with the axe on the boy (according to other sources, the killer used a knife, and this was the only time he supposedly used a knife). After killing the child, Ionesyan took his sweater, 60 rubles, a bottle of cologne "Shipr" and beach glasses.

After questioning the tenants of the house, the police went to 9-year-old Vladimir Teplov (to protect the witness in all documents, including at court, his name was listed as Artyom Frolov). The three-room communal apartment No. 86, located on the second floor, was the first one Ionesyan entered when he was in the house (there were no residential premises on the first floor). Ionesyan, who was there, asked if there was anyone else at home, to which the boy answered mechanically: "Everybody is at home", although in the apartment, except for him, was only his 70-year-old grandmother and a baby. Probably, because of this, Ionesyan did not attack the boy, but, in hesitation, went into the kitchen and inspected the gas stove, from the handle of which policemen removed the clear fingerprints of his fingers. Teplov's testimony (in particular, that the stranger was slightly hunchbacked, although his Caucasian appearance was not pronounced) played a big role in the work of criminalist Sophia Feinstein, who made a facial composite. To recreate the criminal's appearance, they also sought help from the artist Naum Karpovsky and famous sculptor and anthropologist Mikhail Gerasimov. At some point, while Feinstein was working with Teplov, one of MUR's officers glanced into her office, who coincidentally turned out to be very similar to Ionesyan, which allowed her to make a more accurate portrait of the murderer. It was Teplov who first talked about the hat of the stranger and how it was tied on the back of the head, which was then not typical for Muscovites and betrayed him as an outsider. Subsequently, Teplov identified the criminal during the investigative experiment and gave testimony at a closed trial in the Supreme Court of the RSFSR.

=== Murders in Ivanovo ===
On 25 December 1963, Ionesyan, together with Dmitrieva, came to Ivanovo, where he committed two murders. Continuing to pretend to be a gas worker, he entered apartments and looked for suitable victims. In an apartment on Kalinin Street, he killed a 12-year-old boy named Mikhail Kuleshov with an axe, then stole his jacket, a pullover, two pens and several bonds. In another apartment, on Oktyabrskaya Street, he killed a 74-year-old woman, but only took a pocket flashlight and 70 kopeks from her apartment. Returning to Kalinin Street, he again began to walk around the apartments. In one of them, he attacked 15-year-old Galina Petropavlovskaya, who was raped and then struck nine times to the head with the axe. Ionesyan then took a sweater, a jacket, a fluffy shawl and 90 rubles. Despite her injuries, Petropavlovskaya survived and was able to describe her attacker's appearance.

In the evening Ionesyan told Dmitrieva that because of the "government task" he carried out, both of them could be killed, and said it was urgent to leave Ivanovo. They left on foot, walked 10 kilometres towards Moscow and only then took a bus.

After the murders in Ivanovo, the case of the "Mosgaz Murderer" was given special status, and was taken under the personal control by the Minister of Public Order Protection (as it was then called the Ministry of Internal Affairs) Vadim Tikunov and Deputy Chairman of the Council of Ministers Alexei Kosygin. Nikita Khrushchev was also interested in the matter.

=== The fourth murder ===
On 28 December in Moscow, in an apartment on Leningradsky Avenue, Ionesyan killed 11-year-old Alexander Lisovets. When he struck him first with the axe, the boy ran to the toilet and tried to lock it behind him, but the perpetrator managed to overtake him and killed Alexander in the toilet. Ionesyan did not take anything from the apartment: the door to the room where the cabinet stood was locked, and he could not find the key and crack it.

=== The last murder ===
Ionesyan committed his last murder on 8 January 1964, in an apartment on Sheremetyevskaya Street, near Marina Grove. The victim was 46-year-old Maria Ermakova, to whom he introduced himself as an employee of the housing office. Ionesyan struck her about twenty times with his axe, then took from her apartment five skeins of yarn, three pairs of socks, a purse, 30 rubles, a Mir clock and a Start-3 television set.

== Arrest ==
Several residents of Marina Grove told the police that they saw how on the day of the murder a young man of southern appearance with a turned-off TV in a sheet had left the street in a truck. The district commissioner Malyshev had also seen it and managed to remember the first digits of the truck's license plate - 96. The detectives quickly learned the full number - MOG 96-26. The driver admitted that he had driven a man of Caucasian appearance and dropped him off between the Trifonovskaya and Meshchanskaya Streets.

A survey of tenants from nearby houses was carried out. A woman who lived on Shchepkina Street reported that her neighbour had a niece with her husband who looked like a Caucasian, had recently bought a TV and immediately sold it to a tenant from a neighbouring house. While investigating the tenant, police found out that it was the same TV that disappeared from Ermakova's apartment. Ionesyan's apartment was ambushed, but Alevtina Dmitrieva was detained instead of the murderer himself, telling the detectives that Ionesyan was working for the KGB and was on a secret mission (during the arrest, Ionesyan himself introduced himself as a KGB major). A quick check, led by the then chairman of the KGB, Vladimir Semichastny, showed that Vladimir Ionesyan was not listed. Dmitrieva was put in solitary confinement and confessed that her cohabitant went to Kazan, where after a while she was supposed to come too. At the station, it was Ionesyan who was to meet her "on demand". As bait, instead of Dmitrieva, they sent a MUR employee instead.

Ionesyan's detention was supervised personally by the Minister of Public Order Protection of the Tatar ASSR Salikh Yapeyev. On 12 January 1964, without any difficulties, the murderer, nicknamed "Mosgaz", was arrested on a platform of the Kazan railway station.

== Trial and sentence ==
In the documentary film from NTV "Open, Mosgaz!", evidence is provided that Ionesyan talked personally to the General Prosecutor of the USSR Roman Rudenko, who on his behalf took the killer to the office of the then state of head Nikita Khrushchev. According to this version, while looking at Ionesyan, Khrushchev ordered: "In order that in two weeks he should no longer be here...".

Ionesyan's trial was short-lived and was of a closed nature. In fact, the fate of the accused was resolved before the trial. Since his brutal crimes were widely publicized and shocked the public, the Ministry of Public Order Protection proposed that the investigation be completed as soon as possible, that a court be held and the execution sentence be passed to Ionesyan. The correspondence of the police authorities with the Central Committee mentioned the proposal "to sentence Ionesyan to death by hanging and for the sentence to be done publicly". Other, more sophisticated punitive measures were also suggested. First Deputy Chairman of the KGB Philipp Bobkov, while in retirement, mentioned in 2001 that he received letters from citizens and labour collectives, which, in view of the terrible cruelty committed against children, demanded that the criminal be hanged publicly or quartered in Lobnoye Mesto.

The plans of the leadership of the CPSU Central Committee, however, did not include a broad coverage of the process, which some workers of this organization also insisted on. At the same time, the nationality of the offender was taken into account, and the need to avoid the heat of passion on this sensitive soil. This letter was sent for signature to the heads of the administrative departments of the CPSU Central Committee and Central Committee of the RSFSR, Mironov and Laputin: "We believe that the desire to make the upcoming trial sensational is not justified. In our opinion, it would be advisable, in accordance with the law on jurisdiction the Ionesyan case be considered in the Supreme Court of the RSFSR...The trial of the press, radio and television should not be covered, limiting itself to a brief report on the verdict in the central press. The Procuracy of the USSR (Comrade Rudenko) and the Supreme Court of the USSR (Comrade Kulikov) support this proposal. We ask for consent."

The investigation and the trial took only two weeks. On 30 January 1964, the Supreme Court of the USSR issued a verdict: the death penalty. In the verdict of the court, it was clarified that "the verdict is final and can not be appealed". The petition for a pardon was immediately rejected, and on the next day, on 31 January 1964, at 23:00, Vladimir Ionesyan was executed by firing squad at the Butyrka Prison.

Alevtina Dmitrieva was recognized as an accomplice, although Ionesyan shielded her during interrogations, claiming that she knew nothing about the murders, and even her fault, according to later testimonies of forensics experts, was not proven by the court. She was sentenced to 15 years in prison, but later in 1972 (or in 1974), she was released early.

== In the media ==
=== In comics ===
- "The Man of Gryzlov" - in several episodes, there is a henchman of the main villain named Mosgaz.

=== In cinema ===
- "Mosgaz" is a ten-part artistic television series by Andrey Malyukov, released in 2012. The series is a free statement of the real events, with the difference being that Vladimir Ionesyan was renamed Vladislav Vikhrov. Maksim Matveyev performed the role.
- Diagnosis: Maniac (2004).
- "Call, close the door" - a documentary on Channel First (premiered on November 2, 2012).
- "Open, Mosgaz!" - an episode from the documentary series "The investigation was conducted...", hosted by Leonid Kanevsky.
- "Fear of the capital. The Mosgaz case documentary on Channel First" (1998).
