= Police Rapid Response Unit (Finland) =

National police tactical unit of Finland

Special Intervention Unit
- Poliisin Valmiusyksikkö Karhu (Finnish); Polisens beredskapsenhet (Swedish)
- Active: 1972 – present
- Country: Finland
- Agency: Helsinki Police Department
- Type: Police tactical unit
- Operations jurisdiction: National
- Headquarters: Helsinki
- Common name: Bear Squad; Karhu-ryhmä (Finnish)

Structure
- Officers: Approx. 60 (2011)

Equipment
- Animals: 4 police dogs (2011)

The Police Special Intervention Unit (SIU) (Finnish: poliisin Valmiusyksikkö Karhu; Swedish: polisens beredskapsenhet), known as Special Intervention Unit Karhu, is a national police tactical unit in the Helsinki Police Department (HPD) of the Police of Finland.

The unit's missions primarily involve apprehension of armed and dangerous criminals, hostage rescue crisis management, tactical law enforcement and special operations, counterterrorism, reconnaissance, executive and meeting venue protection, and crowd and riot control.

The unit is commonly known as the Bear Squad (Finnish: Karhu-ryhmä).

== History ==
The Police Special Intervention Unit was formed as a national police tactical unit in the spring of 1972. It provided security for the Conference on Security and Co-operation in Europe, held in Helsinki in 1975.

== Organization ==
The Karhu Unit operates under the authority of the Helsinki Police Department and, in turn, the National Police Board and the Ministry of the Interior. According to Finnish law, all counterterrorism and hostage rescue operations are within the jurisdiction of the Police. In addition to operative units, the group includes sniper, technical support, police dog, and bomb disposal teams. It can be reinforced with a negotiation team during hostage crisis management situations.

Team members are selected from currently serving law enforcement personnel and undergo a training of one year, followed by a continuous on-the-job training programme. They alternate between normal field work, training and special operations duties: Training takes approximately half and special operations 1/10 of their time while the rest consists of regular duties.

The team had a strength of around 60 officers and 4 police dogs in 2011.

Karhu is also tasked to support other police units when necessary.

=== Training ===
Karhu often does joint training with the Utti Jaeger Regiment.

== See also ==
- Kauhajoki school shooting
- 2017 Turku stabbing
