= Helsinki Police Band =

Helsinki Police Symphonic Band Helsingin poliisisoittokunta
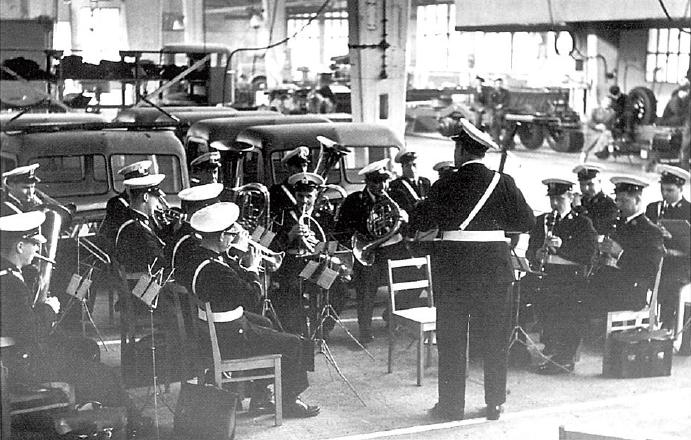
- The Helsinki Police Band performing in a ceremony of Vanajan Autotehdas factory in 1957. The band is under the baton of Georg Malmstén.

Background information
- Origin: Helsinki, Finland
- Years active: 1947-present
- Labels: Finlandia, Elvis, WM Finland

The Helsinki Police Symphonic Band (Finnish: Helsingin poliisisoittokunta) is a 43-member professional wind orchestra, located in Helsinki, the capital of Finland. The band is a pr-unit of the Helsinki Police Department, which is a local agency of the Police of Finland.

The band plays a very important part in the police department's public relations with citizens, with the band commonly representing the police department at many different national and international events. The orchestra is widely known for its versatile repertoire, including symphonic wind band music, as well as folk music, jazz, pop, and music for children.

The Helsinki Police Symphonic Band has enjoyed wide acclaim for decades. The band was first founded in 1947 to improve relations between the audience and the police. Since the beginning the band has performed in places where people gather: large events, hospitals, prisons, sports events, churches, parades, and music halls.

The orchestra plays regular concerts all around the country and performs at various occasions organized by the police. The band performs with Finland's best artists from various genres. In recent years, the band has had Johanna Försti, Maria Ylipää, LaGaylia Frazier, Helena Juntunen, Jorma Hynninen and Mika Pohjonen as soloists, among others. The band has also performed in Germany, Poland, Estonia, Russia and France.

The band also works nationwide with educating concerts for kids and the youth. In addition to music, school bullying, behaviour in traffic, drugs, sexual sovereignty and social media are discussed.

Today, many of the musicians spend half of their working hours in various duties in the police department's traffic police.

== Ensembles ==
In addition to the wind orchestra the Police Band encases smaller ensembles as well:

- Nallekopla
- Lion Patrol
- Woodwind Quintet
- Brass Quintet
- Party Band
- Salon Orchestra
- Brass Septet

== Conductors ==
- Kaarlo Kukkonen (1947-1948)
- Georg Malmstén (1948-1965)
- Harry Hellen (1965-1966)
- Jorma Svanström (1967-1971)
- Arthur Fuhrmann (1971-1993)
- Petri Juutilainen (1993-2002)
- Esko Heikkinen (2002-2012)
- Sami Ruusuvuori (2012–Present)
