= Helsinki Police Department =

Helsinki Police Department Helsingin poliisilaitos
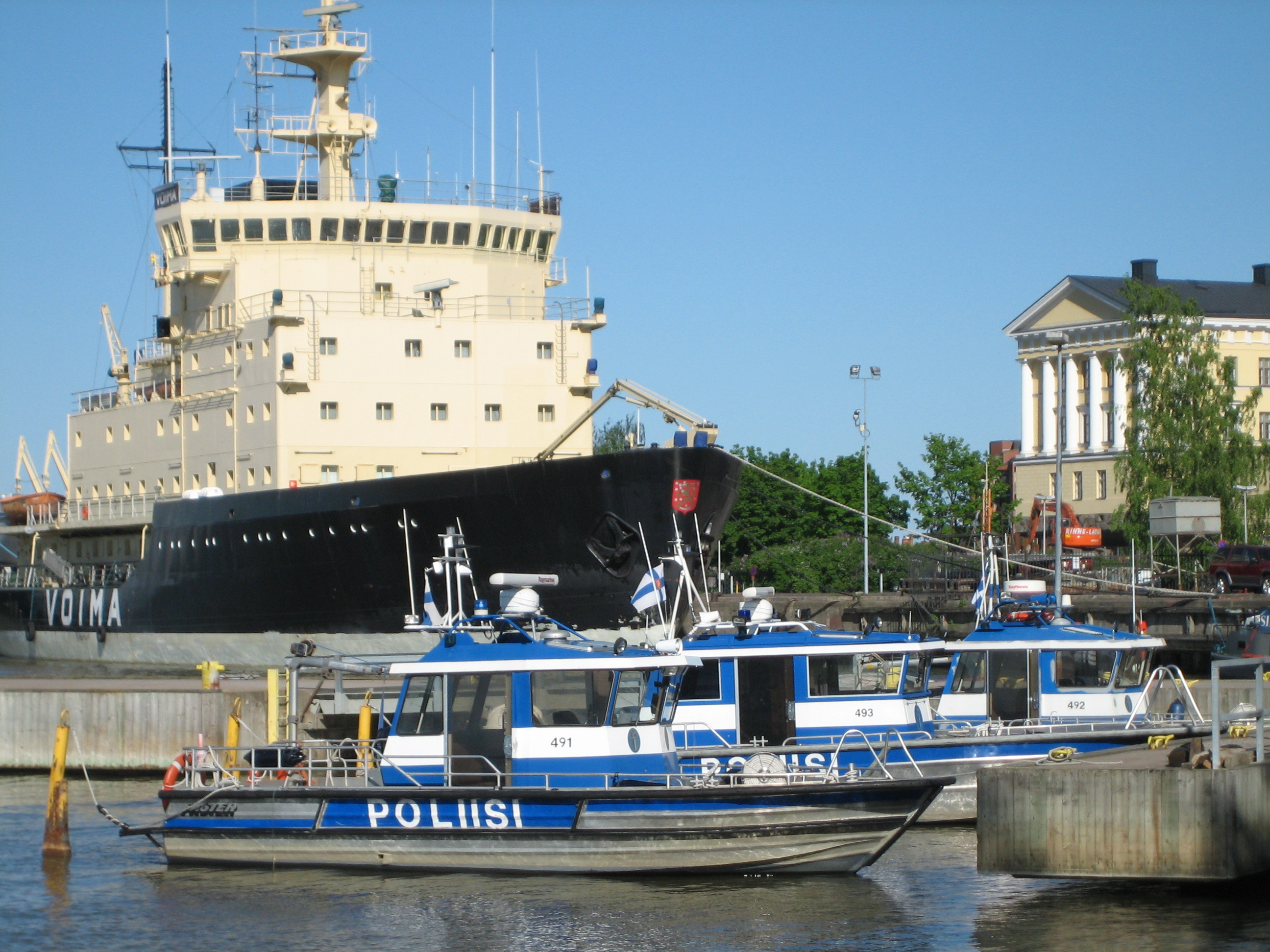
- Patrol boats of the Helsinki Police Department in front of Katajanokka in 2007.
- Common name: Helsinki Police
- Abbreviation: HPD

Agency overview
- Formed: 1826
- Employees: 1,600

Jurisdictional structure
- Operations jurisdiction: Helsinki
- Governing body: Ministry of the Interior
- General nature: Local civilian police

Operational structure
- Headquarters: 11 Police Station, Helsinki
- Parent agency: Ministry of the Interior

Notables
- Anniversary: August 25

Website
- Official site

The Helsinki Police Department (HPD) (Finnish: Helsingin poliisilaitos) is the department of the Police of Finland in charge of the Finnish capital of Helsinki. Its responsibilities include enforcing the law and providing security for the city. The Helsinki Police has close to 1,600 employees. Due to Helsinki's status as the capital of the country, the HPD is the largest and most prominent in the country.

== History ==
The HPD was established in 1826 by order of senior law enforcement officials of the Grand Duchy of Finland, which was a Finnish autonomous government of the Russian Empire. By March 1882, the HPD was temporarily funded and had only four horses available for patrol. A couple of years later, Alexander III of Russia visited Helsinki on an official visit gifted the HPG with more than two horses. The size of the HPD eventually grew slowly. At the turn of the century, the HPD had the capability of patrolling the entire city including the extensive parkland and forest areas of the Töölö neighborhood. The HPD's strength in the 1920s was at least 100 and included veterinarians, soldiers, mages and militiamen who participated in police work. The HPD has taken part in many interventions and conflicts in its history, such as the demonstrations in the capital against the Soviet-led invasion of Czechoslovakia in August 1968. It also has provided security for many events, such as the 8th World Festival of Youth and Students in 1962 and the Helsinki Summit in 2018.

== Uniform ==
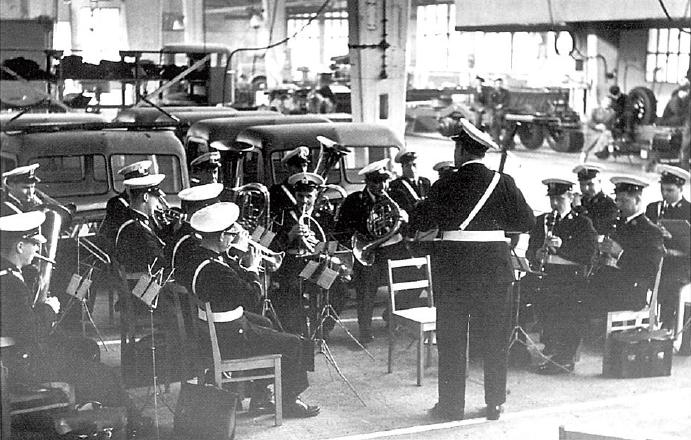
Helsinki Police Band

The police wear field uniforms, protective clothing and special clothing in their everyday activities and work. Formal uniforms are worn during ceremonial events and dress uniforms during special occasions. The first official police uniform was introduced at the department in 1861 and echoed the Western European style of the 19th century. A Russified type of uniform was used during the Russian occupation of the early 1900s, and included breeches and a buttonless jackets.

== See also ==
- Police of Finland
- Ministry of the Interior (Finland)
- Government of Finland
- Helsinki Police Band
