= Law enforcement in Åland =

Police Authority of the Åland Islands

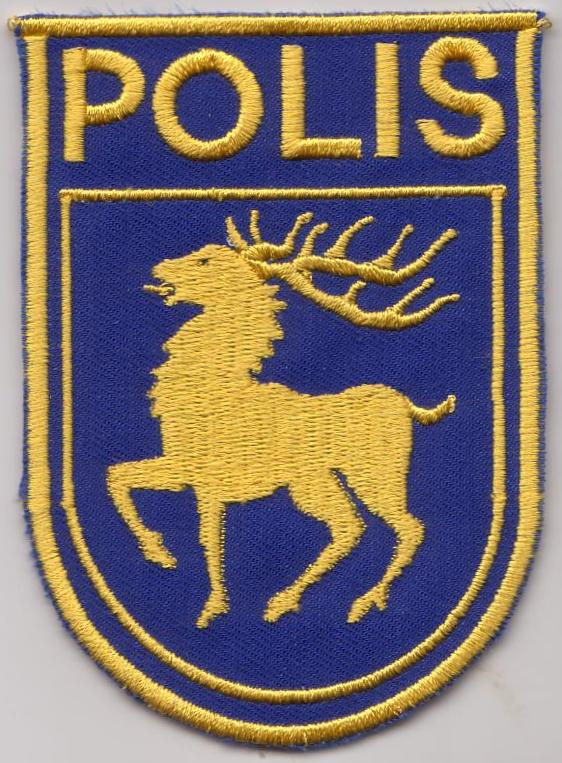
The police badge with the Stag of Åland.

Law enforcement in Åland is the responsibility of the Police Authority of the Åland Islands, a unit independent of the mainland Finnish National Police (as per the Act on the Autonomy of Åland, 1991), which answers to the Åland unit of the National Bureau of Investigation, part of the Government of Åland (the Landskapsregering).

The police officers wear the same uniform as on the mainland, and the police cars have the same paint scheme, but all markings on uniforms or cars are in Swedish only. The police officers also receive their training in the same police academy as the police in mainland Finland.

The Police Authority of Åland is responsible for the security of a population of 26,000 over the 13,517 km^{2} (5,219 sq mi) and 16 municipalities of this Finnish province, and is headquartered in the capital of Mariehamn.

== Ranks ==
Åland
Åland	Polismästare	Överkommissarie	Kommissarie	Överkonstapel	Äldre konstapel	Yngre konstapel

The rank insignia are the same as for the equivalent rank in the national police, except that the Finnish Lion is replaced by the Stag of Åland.
