= Firefighting in Finland =

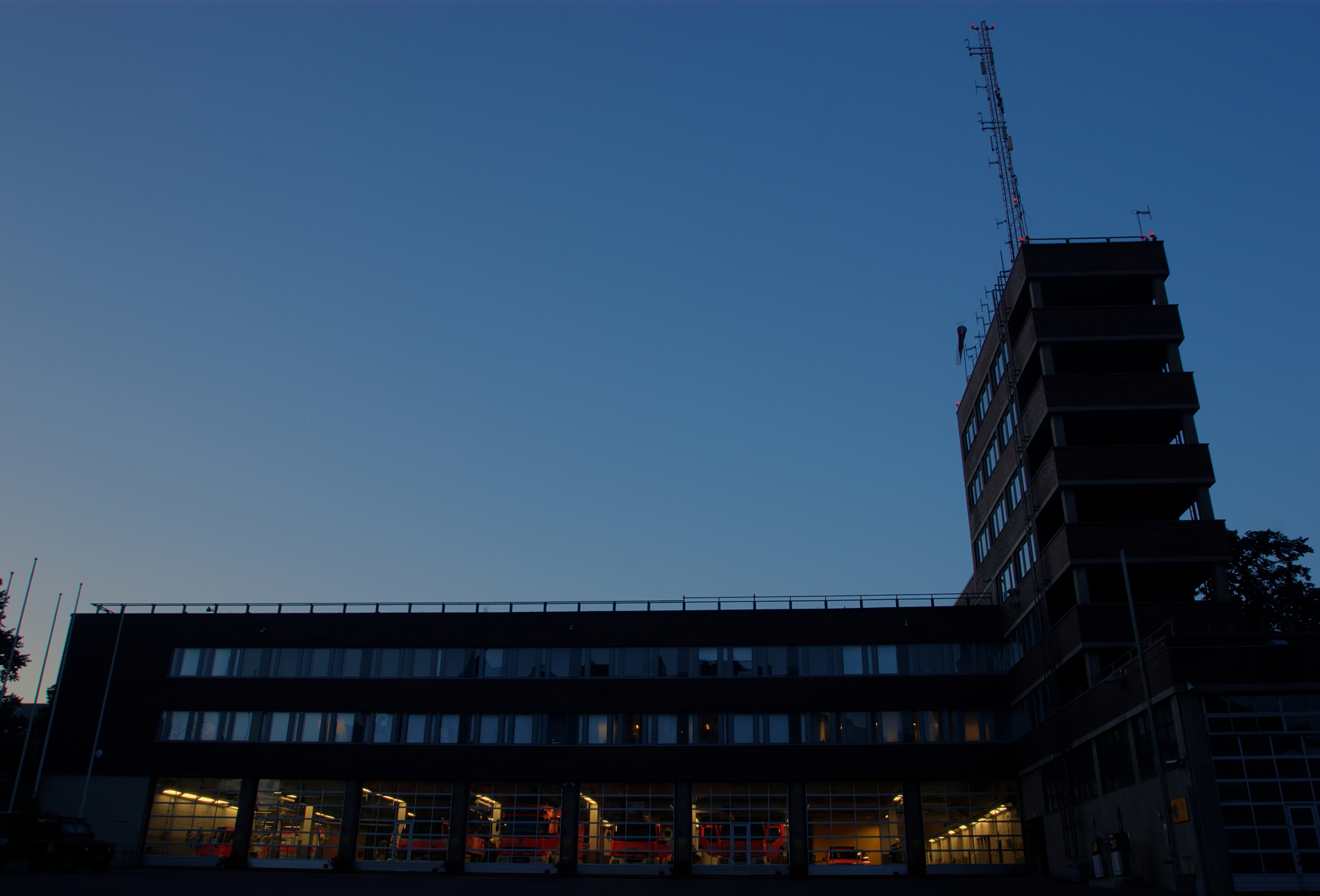
The Central Fire Station of Helsinki at dusk

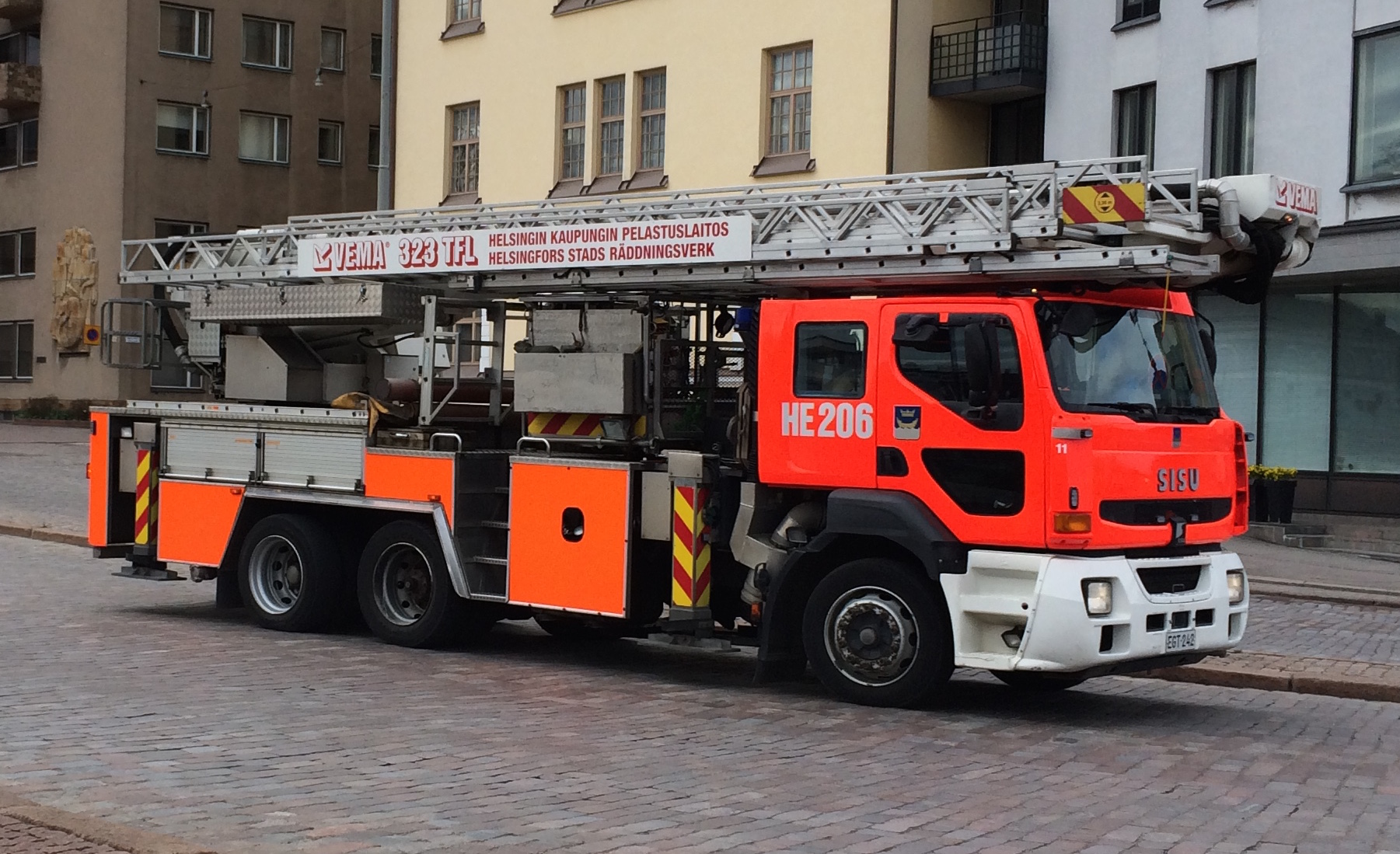
Helsinki City Fire Brigade aerial platform appliance HE206

Firefighting in Finland is regulated by the Ministry of the Interior. Municipalities of Finland can choose whether the fire and rescue services are provided by a professional fire brigade, a half-ordinary fire brigade or a voluntary fire brigade. Half-ordinary and voluntary fire brigades rely on non-professional voluntary firefighters who have been trained appropriately. The main responsibilities of fire brigades are (in decreasing order of importance) rescuing people, protecting property and the environment, limiting damage and consequences.

There are approximately 85,000 emergency missions a year in Finland, of which fires account for 18%. According to the Ministry of the Interior, Finnish fire brigades extinguish around 12,000 fires every year. Voluntary fire brigades have a significant role in the fire rescue service and cover a large part of Finland's area.

In large fires (particularly forest fires) the rescue services also use civilians and members of the Finnish Defence Forces.

== Responsibilities ==
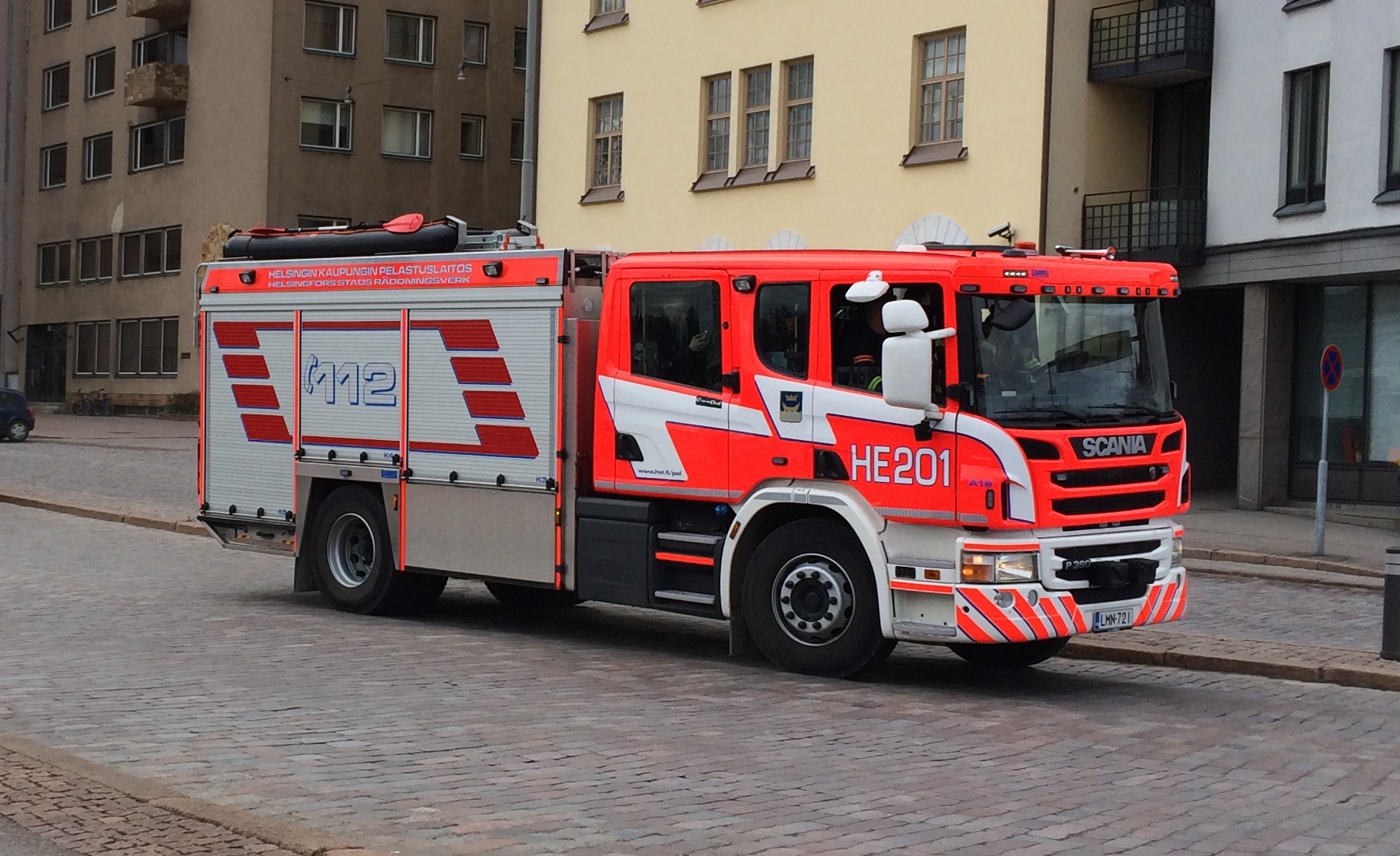
Helsinki City Fire Brigade fire engine HE201 near Helsinki east harbour.

Finland has 22 rescue services regions. These regions operate under the supervision of the Ministry of Interior. Each region is responsible for the rescue service within the area. The Rescue departments are responsible of the rescue services within a rescue services region and function as the regional rescue authorities.

The Rescue Departments in Finland have several responsibilities. They include, but are not limited to:

- Accident prevention, damage mitigation and fire inspections, safety education and advice
- Rescue operations
- Civil defence

Rescue departments rarely provide only firefighting services, but also perform several other types of rescue operations and often also ambulance/emergency medical services for the municipalities.

The rescues service regions have different risk areas. The risk areas are categorised by time constraints set to the rescue service. For example, in risk area 2, the rescue unit must arrive at the accident site within ten minutes of the emergency call.

== Professional firefighting ==
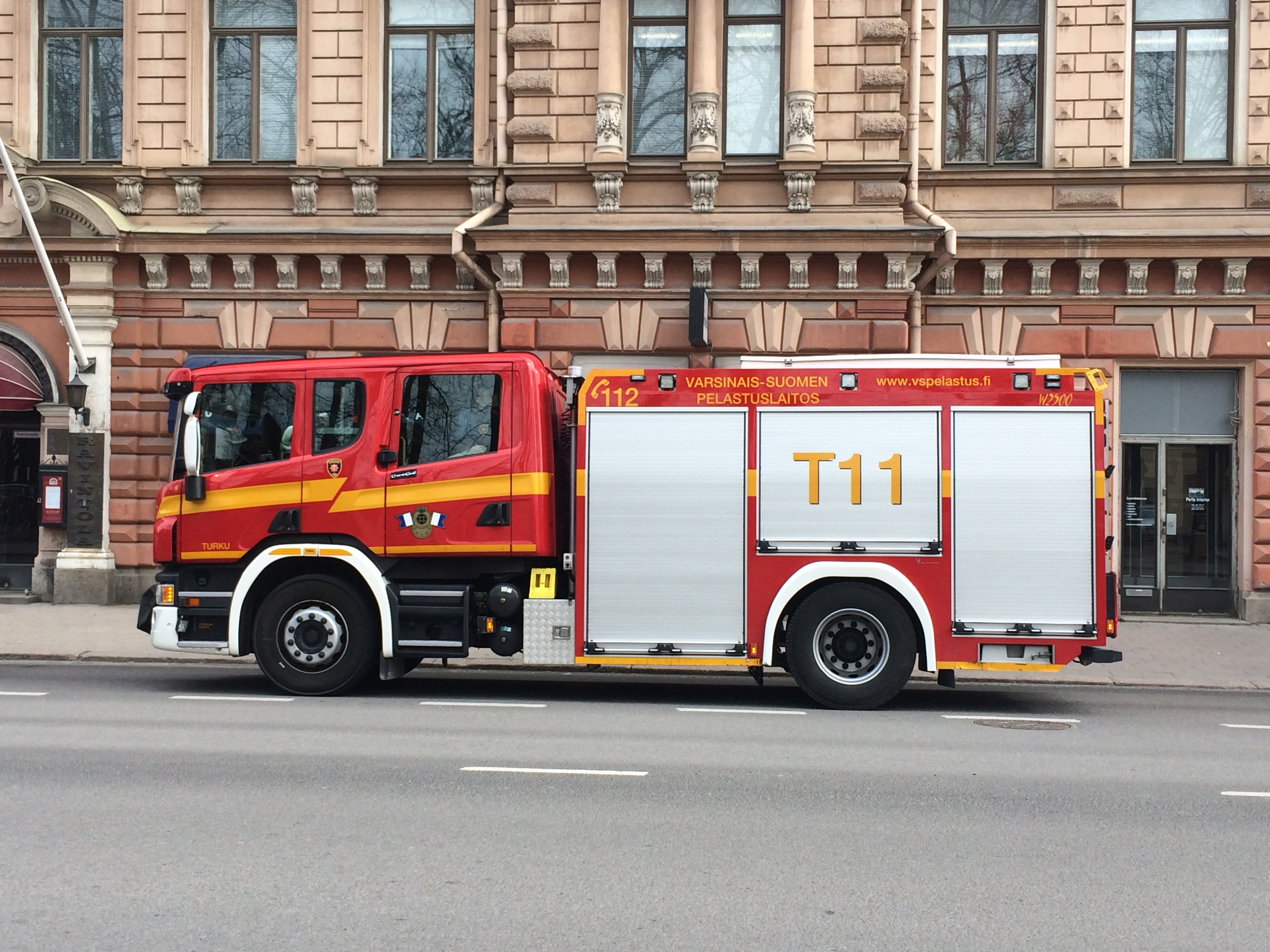
Fire appliance T11 in Turku, Finland.

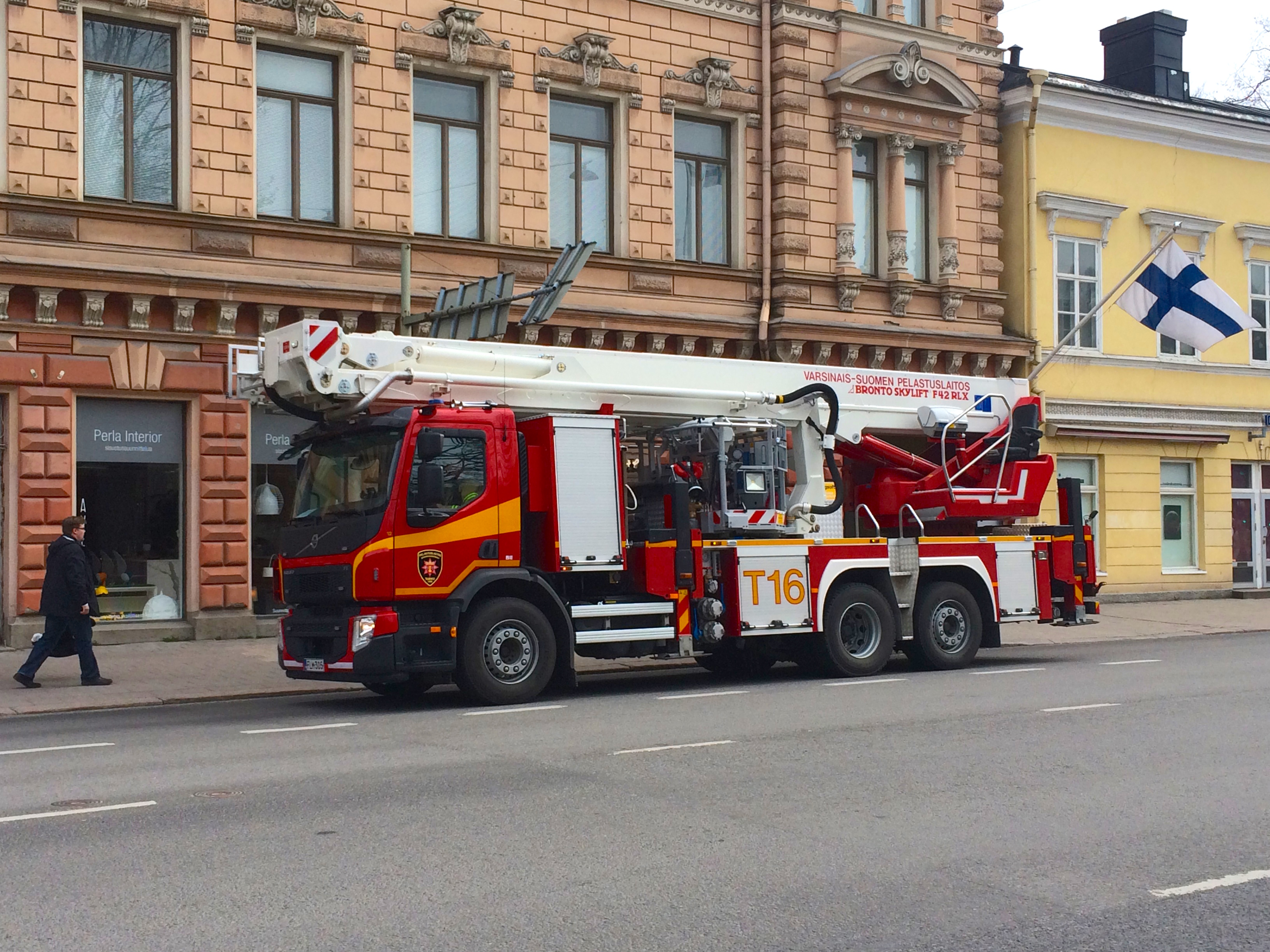
Fire appliance T16 (a Bronto Skylift) in Turku, Finland.

Finland's professional fire and rescue service is provided by approximately 5,000 full-time employees. The professional firefighters are trained at either the Emergency Services College or City of Helsinki rescue school which trains firefighters in Helsinki.

=== Emergency Services College ===
The professional firefighters in Finland are trained by the Emergency Services College which operates under the Ministry of the Interior. Dating back to the 1930s, its main tasks are to plan and provide fire and rescue training, civil defence training and other emergency operation training. It started as the "Fire Officers' School" in Helsinki and has since changed its name various times.

The college is nowadays situated in Kuopio and has various facilities for teaching, including special classrooms for teaching the various aspects in the several fields of firefighting and includes a 23-hectare training ground. The college can accommodate 350 people (of which most are students).

The Emergency Services College is responsible for the coordination of the research activities for the rescue services. The tasks of Research and Development unit include: analysing research needs, collecting the information following studies and summarising research programmes in Finland and abroad, and carrying out studies independently and in cooperation with other research institutes. The main focus is to contribute to improve the use of the research results in the rescue services by integrating the results in the curricula of the ESC.

The Research and Development Unit employs five full-time employees. Moreover, about 10 persons take part in the research and development projects every year. Special expertise of Research and Development unit are in ICT within emergency services, CBRNE and dealing with cross-border emergencies, exploitation of statistics, future foresight in rescue services and accident investigation. The ESC has 38 hectare wide training ground. The training ground has approximately 100 different training points or simulators. Field tests and authentication methods can be easily performed for the research and development purposes.

The college's current principal is Mrs Mervi Parviainen.

=== Industrial fire brigades ===
There are over 150 industrial fire brigades in Finland. These fire brigades usually operate in large industrial sites with the firefighters also working at the site. Their staff have often received special training for demanding industry-area rescue missions. This special training can include dealing with poisonous substances, operating in extremely complex industrial buildings and other similar tasks.

== Voluntary firefighting ==
A large part of Finnish fire and rescue responsibility is on voluntary fire brigades. They are contracted by the municipality and are usually associations. In some municipalities, the firefighting is entirely a voluntary fire brigade's task. There are over 600 voluntary fire brigades in the country. In 400 municipalities the voluntary fire brigades provide all the fire and rescue services. Approximately 47% of Finland's population lives in these municipalities and they make up for 95% of the country's area. The voluntary fire brigades offer approximately 15 000 trained firefighters that are actively in service.

Voluntary fire brigades operate in all risk areas.

=== Types of voluntary fire brigades ===
In Finland, there are two types of voluntary fire brigades:

- Voluntary fire brigades
- Half-ordinary fire brigades

The half-ordinary fire brigades have some firefighters with a contract; however, these firefighters are not professional firefighters. The people in both voluntary and half-ordinary fire brigades may get paid for their work in actual emergency situations. This is often the case especially with voluntary (and half-ordinary) fire brigades operating in high risk areas.

=== Training ===
Voluntary fire brigades have an extensive training programme for new members. The training usually includes basic firemen skills (how to handle the personal gear, first aid, fire engine operation) and possibly fitness exercises. There are training courses, which teach for example:

- Initial training
- Basic firemen skills, which include
  - Basic techniques for extinguishing fires
  - First Aid including CPR, trauma patient care etc.
  - Use of Self contained breathing apparatus (SCBA)
- Advanced skills
  - Rescue skills for dealing with car accidents etc.
  - Mitigation of damage in an oil-related accident
  - Dealing with hazardous substances (such as chemicals)
  - Unit leading

Some of these courses are considered optional and others mandatory. To operate in a real emergency scene, one must have completed both initial training and a basic firemen skill course. The use of breathing apparatus is allowed for personal protection; use in confined spaces is only allowed after a course.

=== Women's activities in voluntary fire brigades ===
In addition to actively taking part in firefighting operations within voluntary fire brigades, there are also women-specific activities in many fire brigades. They often cooperate with the youth workers in voluntary fire brigades, arrange catering services in major accident sites, provide mental help for the victims of accidents etc.

The women's activities in voluntary fire brigades are often in their own department. There are over 350 women's departments in Finnish fire brigades.

=== Youth in voluntary fire brigades ===
Youth practising

The youth work in fire brigades dates back to the 1800s. It aims to increase the safety awareness of youth, train new members for fire brigades and provide the youth with a useful hobby. There are over 500 youth departments (in which there are over 10 000 young firefighters) in Finnish fire brigades and most of them accept boys and girls, usually aged 8 to 16.

The youth in the fire brigades have their own training system. These courses teach safety knowledge, firefighting, first aid and other related skills. When the youth turn 16, they can start to participate in the operational section of the fire brigade and also often remain as instructors for other youth.

There are various events in Finland for the youth sections of fire brigades, including camps (where the youth participate in training courses and leisure time activities) and competitions. The camps and competitions can either be regional or national, and Finnish youth have also participated in international contests and camps.

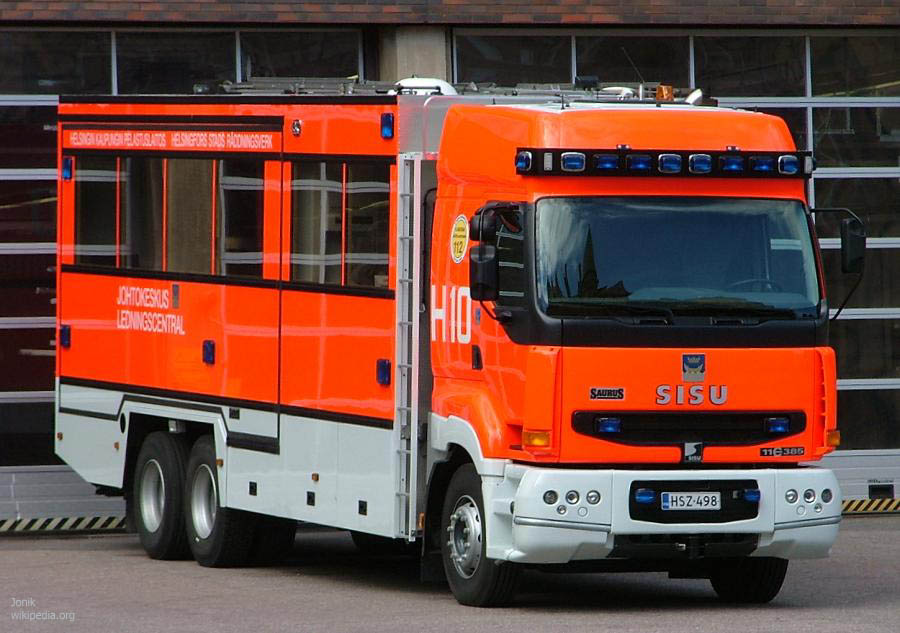
A modern command-centre fire engine in Helsinki, Finland

== Equipment ==
The firefighting equipment, from fire engines to the personal protective gear firemen wear, is fairly modern in Finland. The fire and rescue services have approximately 4 500 vehicles in their use.

Voluntary fire brigades often "recycle" equipment. The fire brigades operating in higher risk areas will get new equipment and their old equipment will be moved onwards to fire brigades in lesser risk areas.

The Ministry of the Interior has set strict rules and regulations governing the protective gear and fire brigades' equipment.

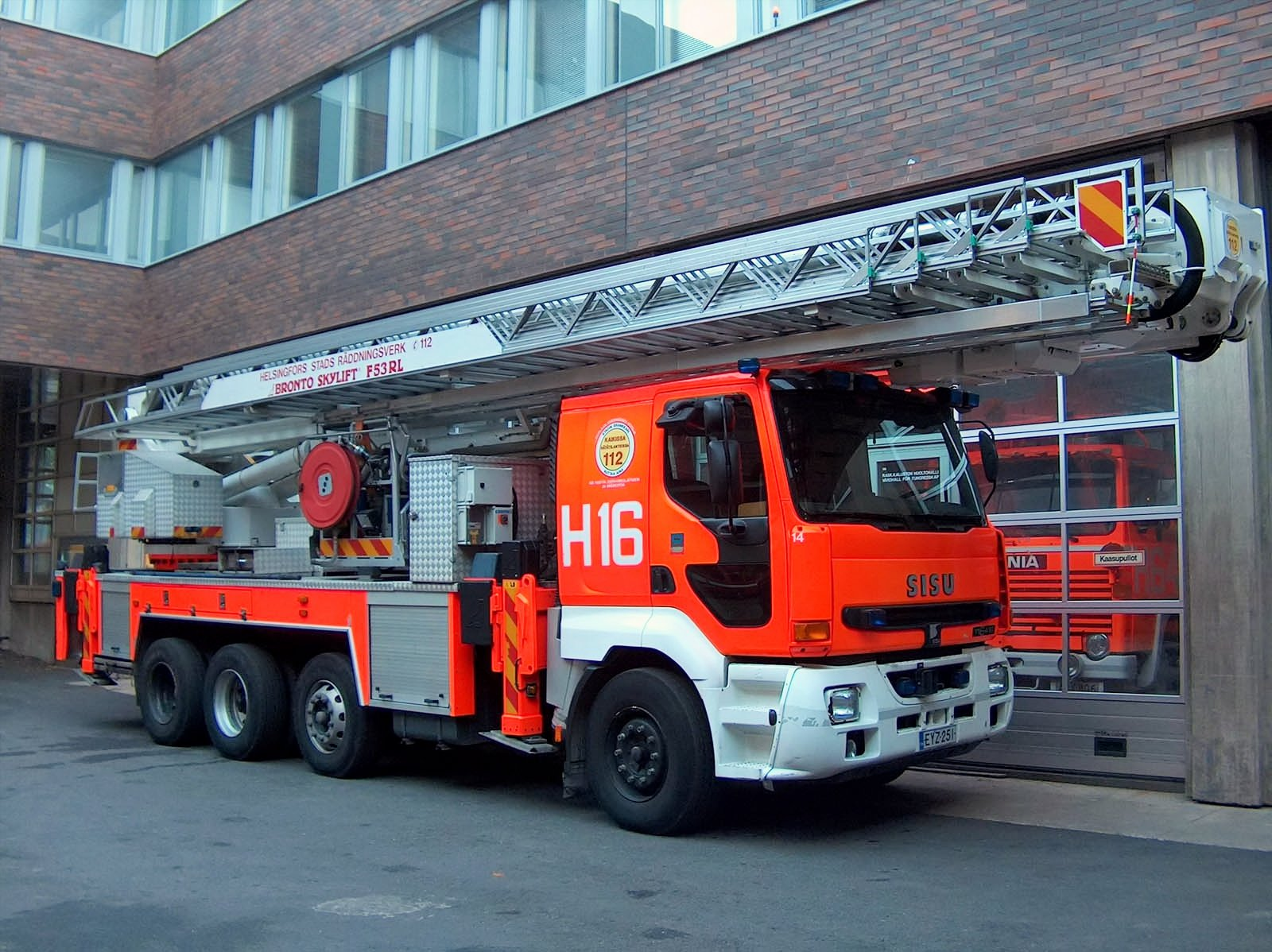
An aerial platform unit of Helsinki City Fire Department

== Suomen Pelastusalan Keskusjärjestö ==
Suomen Pelastusalan Keskusjärjestö, SPEK (the Finnish National Rescue Association) is a central organisation in Finland for fire and rescue service. It is a non-profit organisation funded by various foundations and funds. SPEK campaigns for public awareness about fire and safety issues. It also aims to be a central national organisation for (voluntary) fire brigades in Finland. SPEK supervises and coordinates their activity. Also the women and youth work fire brigades do is heavily influenced by SPEK.

== See also ==
- firefighting
- firefighter
- Wildfire suppression
- "Logging Mechanization and Impacts on Health". National Institute for Occupational Safety and Health.
