= Police of Finland =

Police of Finland Poliisi (Finnish) Polis (Swedish)
- The head of lion from the Finnish coat of arms and the sword emblem is the symbol of the Police of Finland
- Common name: Poliisi (the police)
- Motto: Kaikkien turvaaja kaikkina aikoina. eng. ″Everyone's protector at all times.″

Agency overview
- Formed: 1816; 210 years ago

Jurisdictional structure
- Operations jurisdiction: Finland
- General nature: Civilian police

Operational structure
- Headquarters: Helsinki
- Parent agency: Ministry of the Interior

Website
- Official Site

The Police of Finland (Finnish: Poliisi, Swedish: Polis) is a national government agency responsible for general police and law enforcement matters in the Republic of Finland. The Police of Finland is subordinate to the Ministry of the Interior and consists of the National Police Board, two national police units and 11 local police departments.

On 1 October 2003, the Public Order Act went into effect, standardising public ordinances throughout the country.

== History ==
The roots of policing in Finland date back to the early 19th century, when Governor-General Fabian Steinheil (1762–1831) demanded the establishment of a police department in Turku in 1811. The first police department was established in Turku in December 1816. After this, police departments were established in Helsinki in 1826 and in Vyborg in 1836. In the late 19th century, police departments were established in Tampere (1891) and Pori (1899), and in 13 other cities between 1902 and 1916.

== Local police departments ==
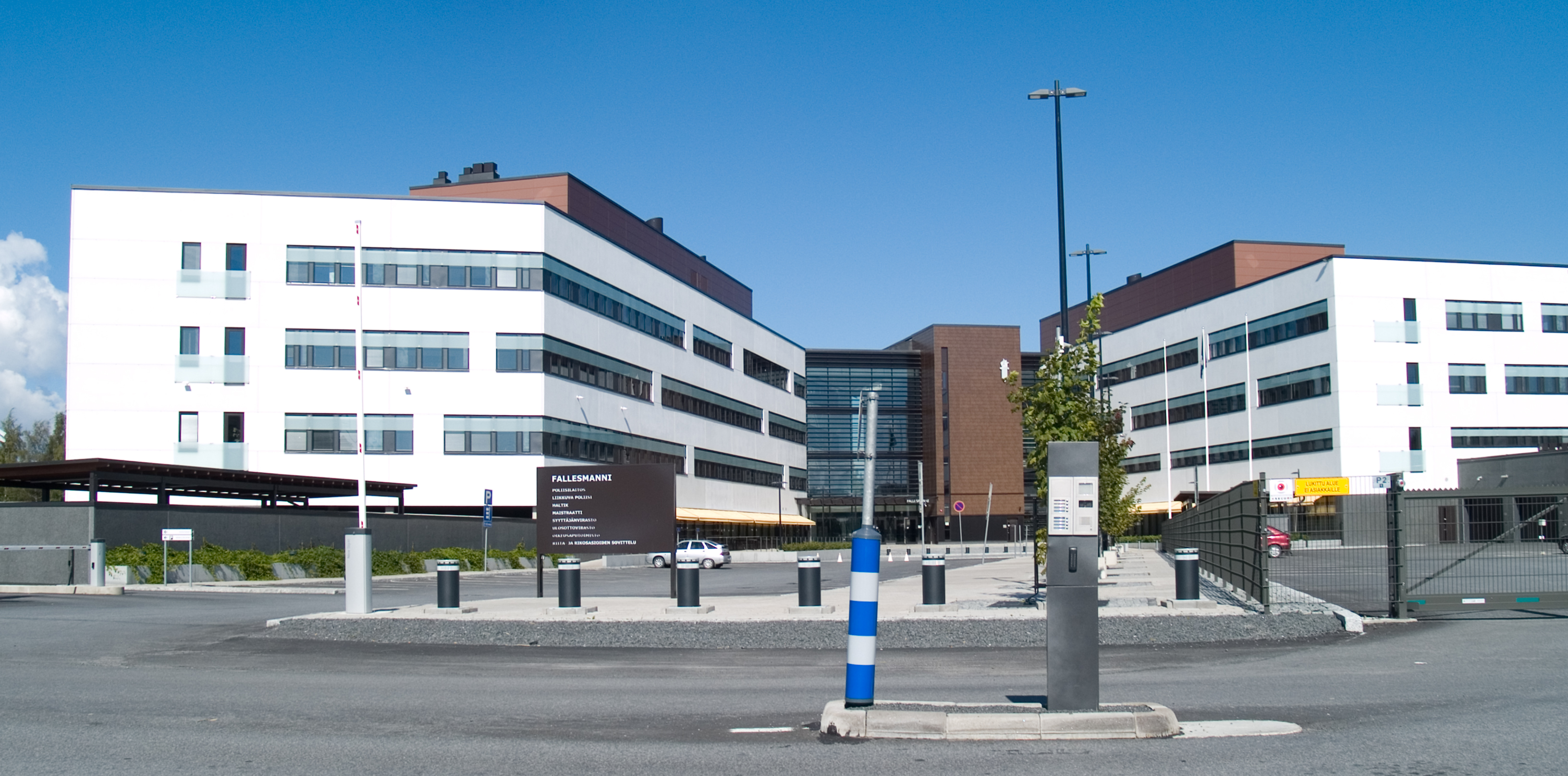
Seinäjoki police office

The police is divided into police departments, which encompass the area of multiple municipalities; municipalities do not have police forces of their own. The function of each police department is to maintain general law and order, prevent crime, investigate crime and other events that threaten public order and safety, to carry out traffic control and surveillance and promote traffic safety, and perform all other duties prescribed by law or otherwise assigned to the police in their area. Local police departments are organized into uniformed patrol police (Finnish: järjestyspoliisi, literally "order police") and criminal investigation police (Finnish: rikospoliisi, literally "criminal police").

Local police also processes licenses and permits such as gun licenses, national ID cards and passports, and furthermore, enforces immigration decisions by the Finnish Immigration Service. Local police must also be notified when organizing public events that may significantly influence local public security and traffic. Driving licenses were once issued by the local police, but since 2016 are issued by Traficom (Finnish Transport and Communications Agency).

Alarm services are operated by Emergency Response Centres managed by the Ministry of the Interior in cooperation with the Ministry of Social Affairs and Health.

Local police departments as of 2014:

- Lapland Police Department (Rovaniemi)
- Central Finland Police Department (headquarters in Tampere)
- Eastern Finland Police Department (Kuopio)
- Eastern Uusimaa Police Department (Vantaa)
- Helsinki Police Department (Helsinki)
- Häme Police Department (Lahti)
- Ostrobothnia Police Department (Vaasa)
- Oulu Police Department (Oulu)
- Southeastern Finland Police Department (Kouvola)
- Southwestern Finland Police Department (Turku)
- Western Uusimaa Police Department (Espoo)

In addition, Åland has its own police department which falls under the responsibility of the Government of Åland (see law enforcement in Åland).

== National police units ==
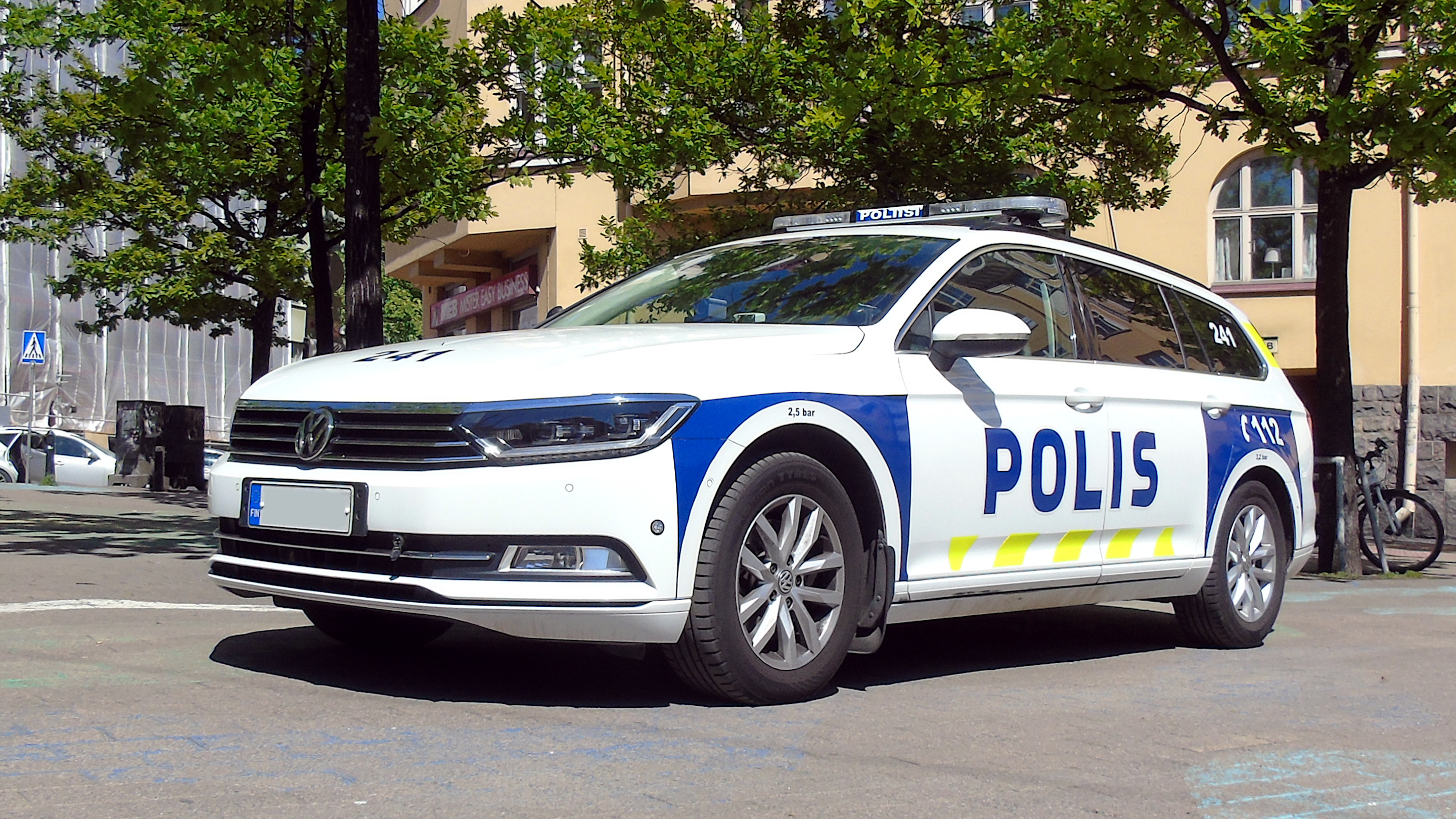
Finnish police car (Volkswagen Passat)

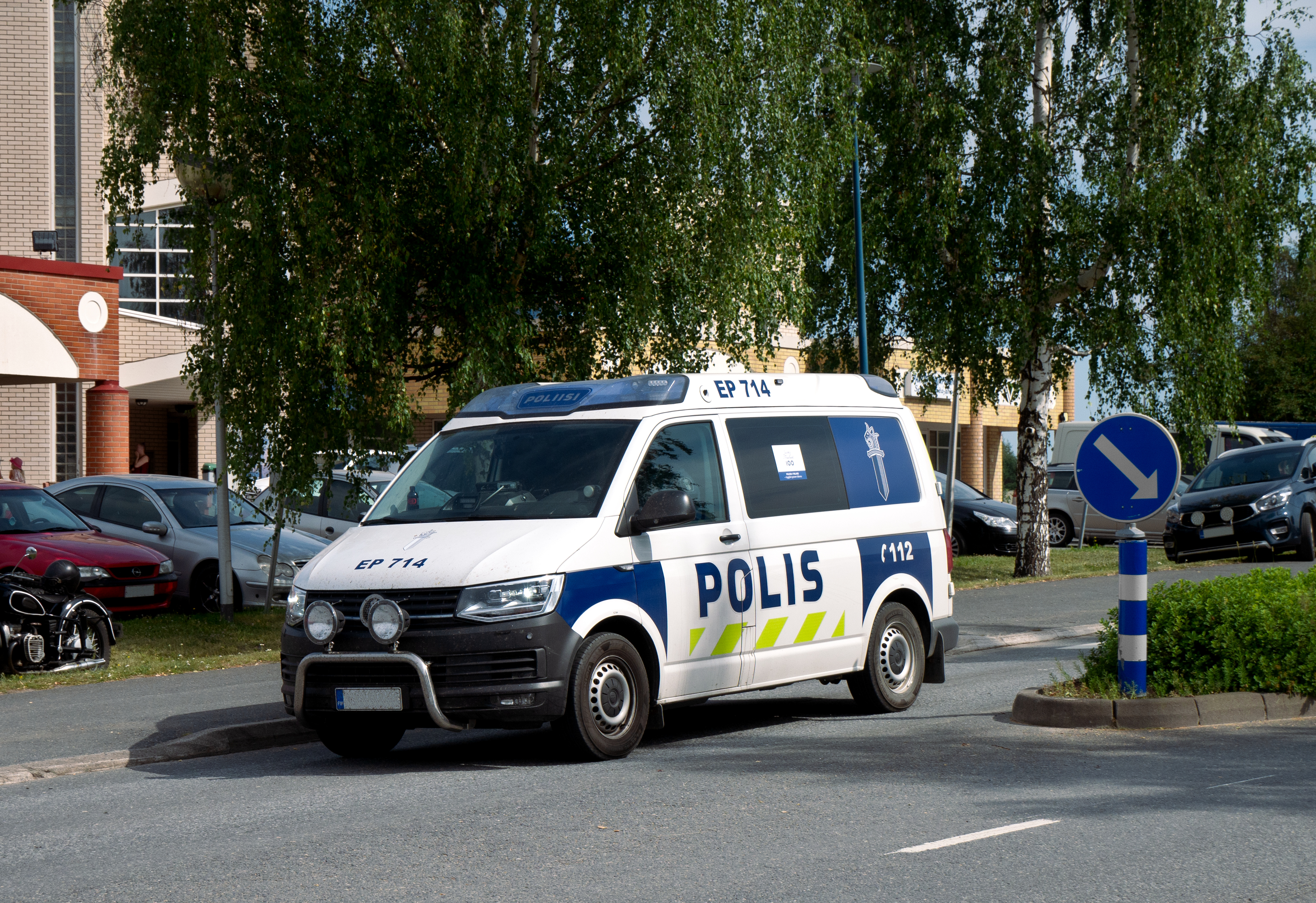
Finnish police van (Volkswagen Transporter)

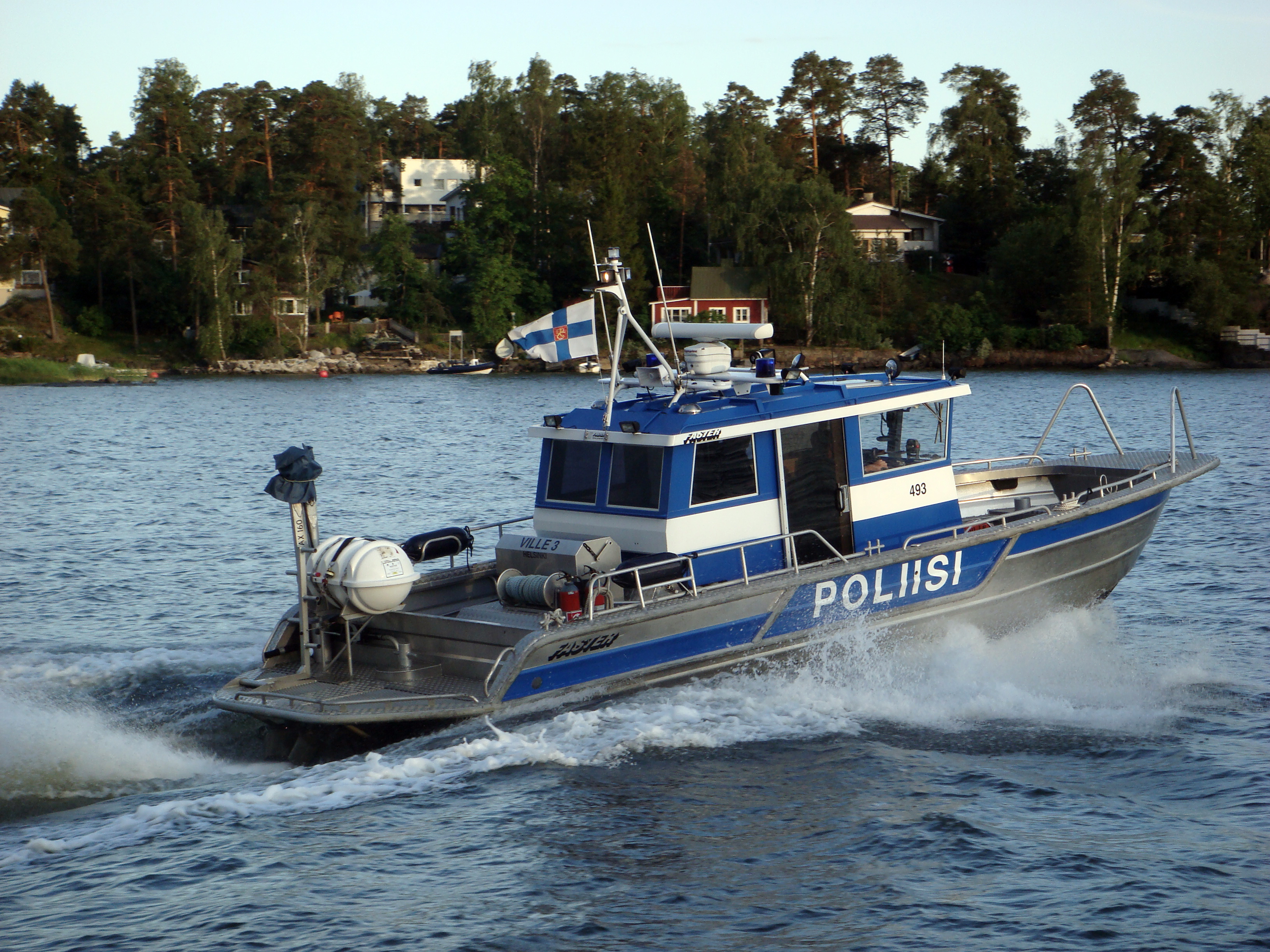
Finnish police patrol boat

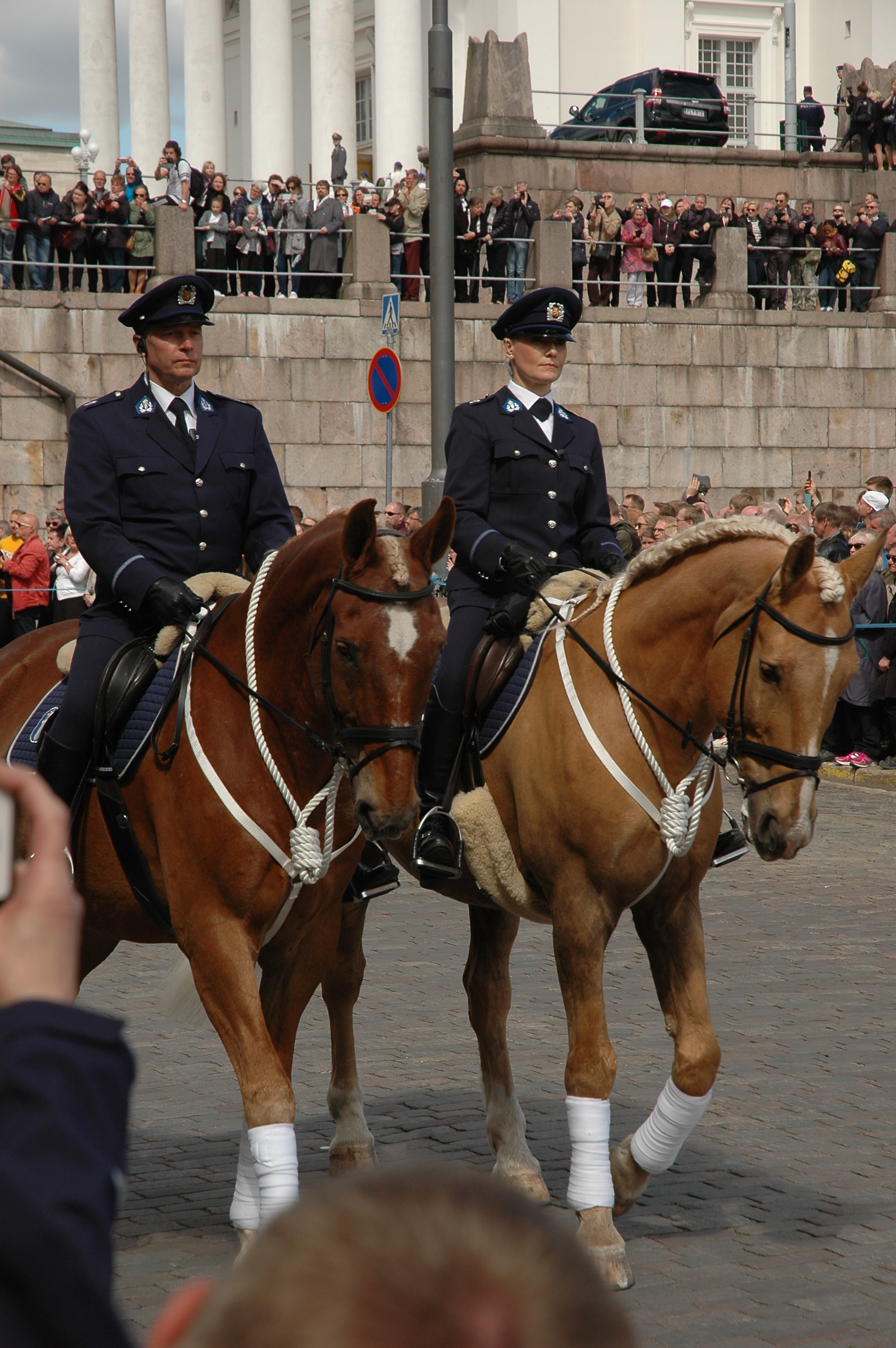
Finnish mounted police in Helsinki during the state funeral of Mauno Koivisto.

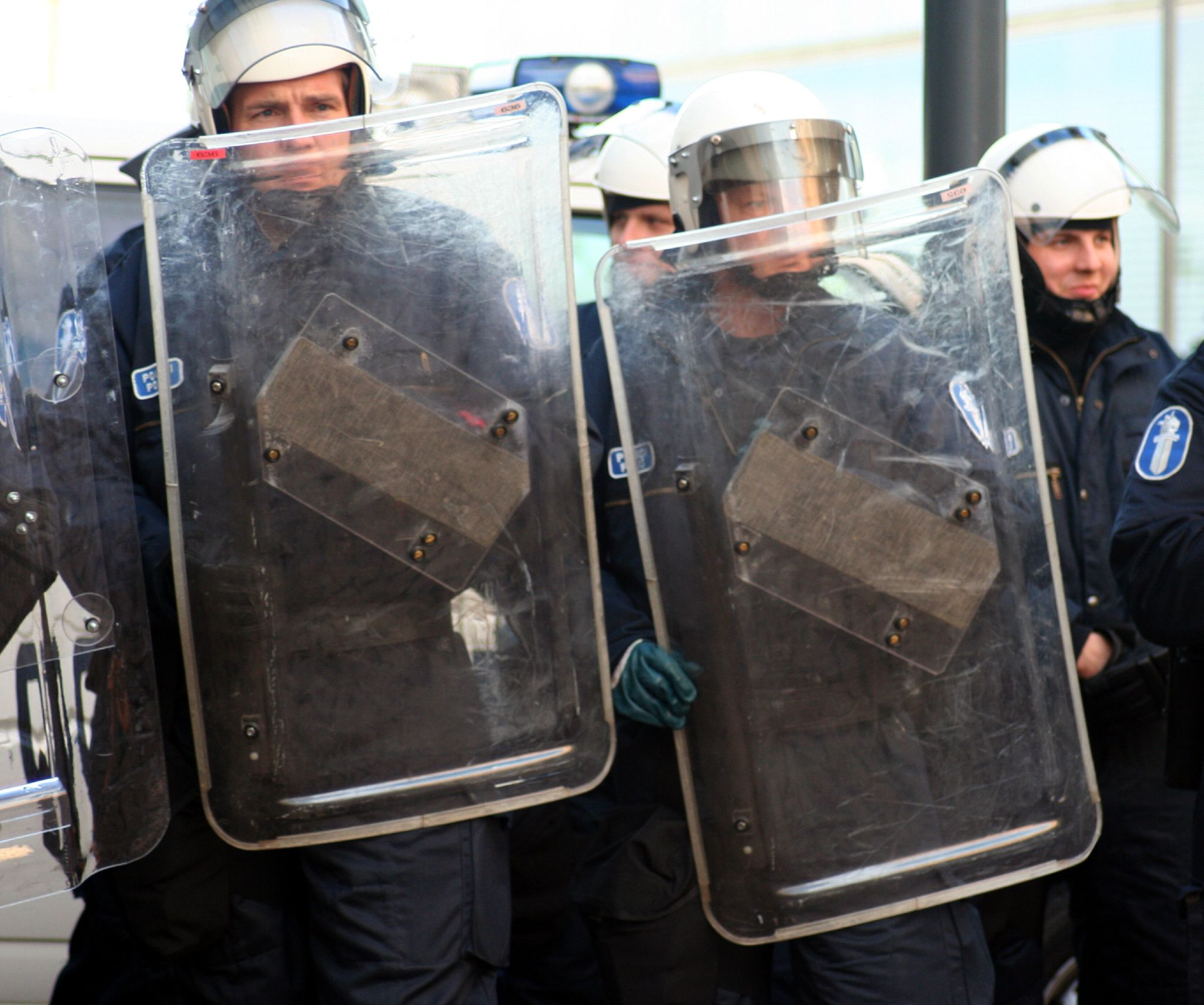
Finnish police officers in riot gear

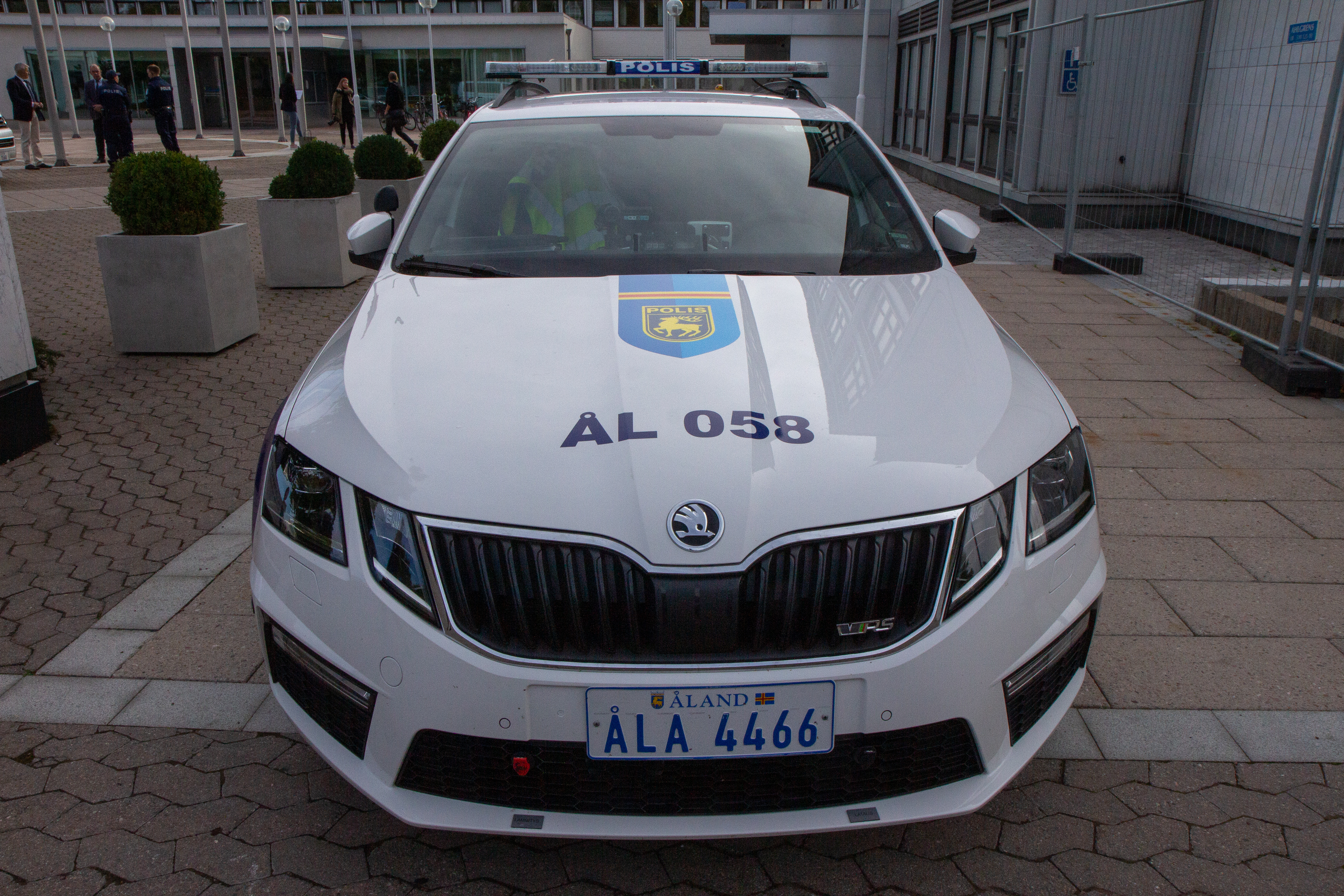
Åland department's patrol car

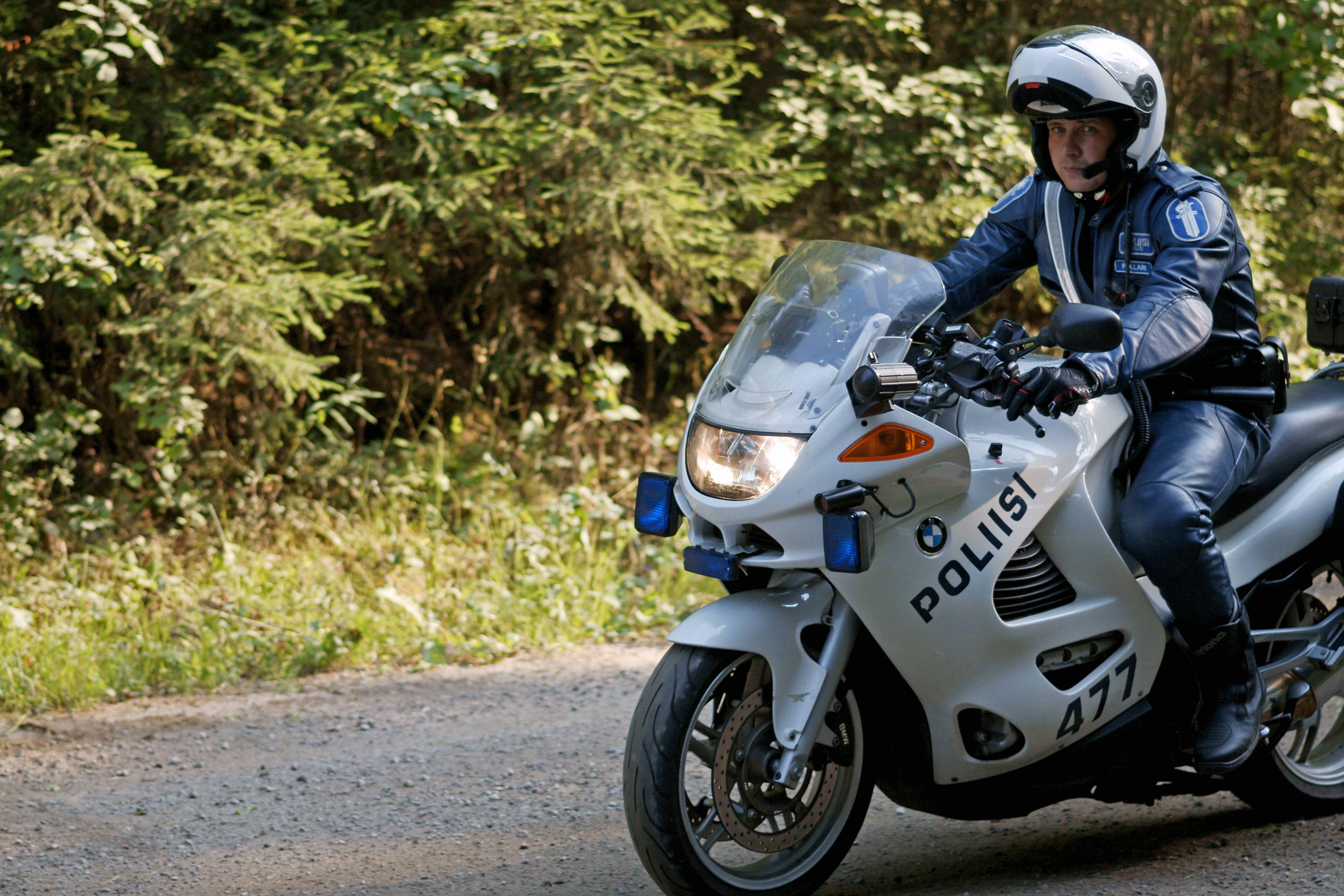
Finnish motorcycle police riding on a countryside road at the Rally Finland event in 2010.

The National Bureau of Investigation (Finnish: Keskusrikospoliisi, KRP, Swedish: Centralkriminalpolisen, CKP) is responsible for major criminal investigations and certain types of specialist services such as fingerprint recognition. The NBI was formed in 1954 to assist the country's other police elements in efforts against crime, particularly that of a serious or deeply rooted nature. A special concern of the NBI is white-collar crime. To carry out its mission, the force has advanced technical means at its disposal, and it maintains Finland's fingerprint and identification files. The NBI is not a part of the police, instead it is a separate nationwide law enforcement agency which assists local police with investigations. .

The Police University College (Finnish: Poliisiammattikorkeakoulu, Polamk, Swedish: Polisyrkeshögskolan) in Tampere is responsible for police training, research and development.

The Finnish Security Intelligence Service (Finnish: Suojelupoliisi, Supo, Swedish: Skyddspolisen, Skypo) is responsible for national security and the investigation of related crimes. The Supo was moved directly under the Ministry of the Interior in 2016.

The National Traffic Police (Finnish: Liikkuva poliisi, Swedish: Rörliga polisen) was folded into the local police in 2013, thus local police is also responsible for highway patrol. Originally, local police districts were very small and had limited resources, so a separate mobile police organization was founded for riot control, alcohol law enforcement and reserve force duties. Political reliability and independence from local strongmen was also important because of the threat from fascists; indeed, the first task was to escort former president K.J. Ståhlberg back to his home after he was kidnapped by the Lapua Movement. This organization later evolved into a highway patrol. However, because of mergers, local police departments had become larger. Thus, the separate national organization was deemed redundant and traffic police units were subordinated to the local police departments instead, without change in the actual number of highway patrol officers.

=== Other nationally active formations ===
Special Intervention Unit Karhu (Finnish: Poliisin valmiusyksikkö Karhu), also known as the "Bear Squad" (Finnish: "Karhu-ryhmä"), is a specialized armed response unit. The unit is officially part of the Helsinki Police Department.

In June 2008, the Finnish police established a Police Incident Response Team tasked with improving the prevention, detection and management of serious information security incidents.

The police uses a VATV (Vaativan ajotavan valvonta) unit that is specialized in high-speed driving and pursuits. The unit consists of specially trained police officers who utilize several unmarked high-performance cars.

== Police ranks ==
The Finnish police uses the following ranks:

Criminal investigators prefix their ranks with rikos-, "Detective", literally "Crime", e.g. rikostarkastaja.

Rank insignia on the shoulder epaulettes is all silver on blue with a silver button. The rank insignia for Senior Constable is a single bar, added with two chevrons for Sergeant. Police officers have bordered rows of oak leaves, with a Lion of Finland next to them. Additionally, on the collar there is pentagonal insignia that always has the emblem with laurel leaves and a border, but with colors slightly varying with rank; officers have a border around the pentagon.

Police ranks of Finland
Group	Officers							
Insignia								
Rank	Poliisiylijohtaja; Polisöverdirektör	Poliisijohtaja; Polisdirektör	Poliisipäällikkö; Polischef	Poliisiylitarkastaja; Polisöverinspektör	Apulais-poliisipäällikkö; Biträdande polischef	Poliisitarkastaja; Polisinspektör	Ylikomisario; Överkommissarie	Komisario; Kommissarie
Commonwealth equivalent	National Police Commissioner	Deputy National Police Commissioner	Police Chief	Assistant Police Commissioner	Deputy Police Chief	Chief Superintendent	Superintendent	Chief inspector
Group	Non-commissioned officers	Policemen						
Insignia								
Commonwealth equivalent	Ylikonstaapeli; Överkonstapel	Vanhempi konstaapeli Äldre konstapel	Nuorempi konstaapeli Yngre konstapel					
English	Sergeant	Senior constable	Police constable					

== Equipment ==
=== Ordinary armament ===
- Baton
- Pepper spray
- TETRA
- Handcuffs
- Light and heavy armor

=== Weaponry ===
Model	Origin	Type	Usage	Reference
Taser X26	USA	Less lethal		
FN 303	Belgium	Less lethal		
Glock 17	Austria	Semi-automatic pistol	Being replaced by the Walter P99Q	
Walter P99Q	Germany	Semi-automatic pistol	Standard issue	
Heckler & Koch VP9	Germany	Semi-automatic pistol	In use	
Glock 19	Austria	Semi-automatic pistol	In use	
Glock 26	Austria	Semi-automatic pistol	In use	
Heckler & Koch MP5	Germany	Submachine gun	Being replaced by the CZ Scorpion Evo 3	
CZ Scorpion Evo 3	Czech Republic	Submachine gun	Standard issue	
Heckler & Koch G36C	Germany	Assault rifle		
Remington 870	USA	Shotgun		

=== Vehicles ===
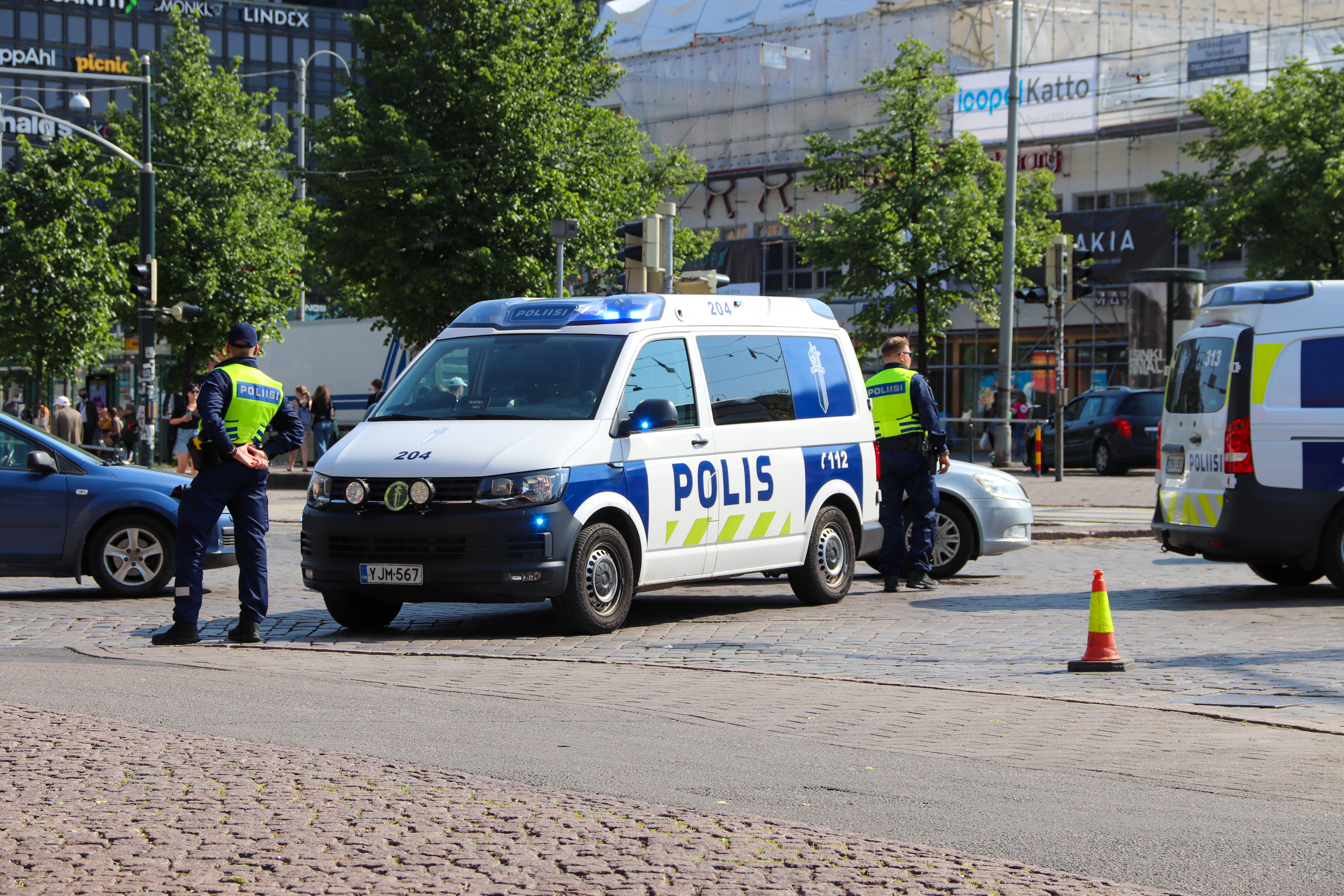
Finnish police vans with visible bilingual markings

The most common patrol vehicle of police in Finland is Volkswagen Transporter, usually with 2.5 L diesel engines. In 2002 about one third of Finnish police cars were Transporters. Transporters are also used by border guards, customs, and sotilaspoliisi (military police). Due to the bilingualism of the country, the right side of the vehicles is marked in Finnish (POLIISI), the left side is marked in Swedish (POLIS). The siren used for the Finnish police cars are also used for the police of Sweden.

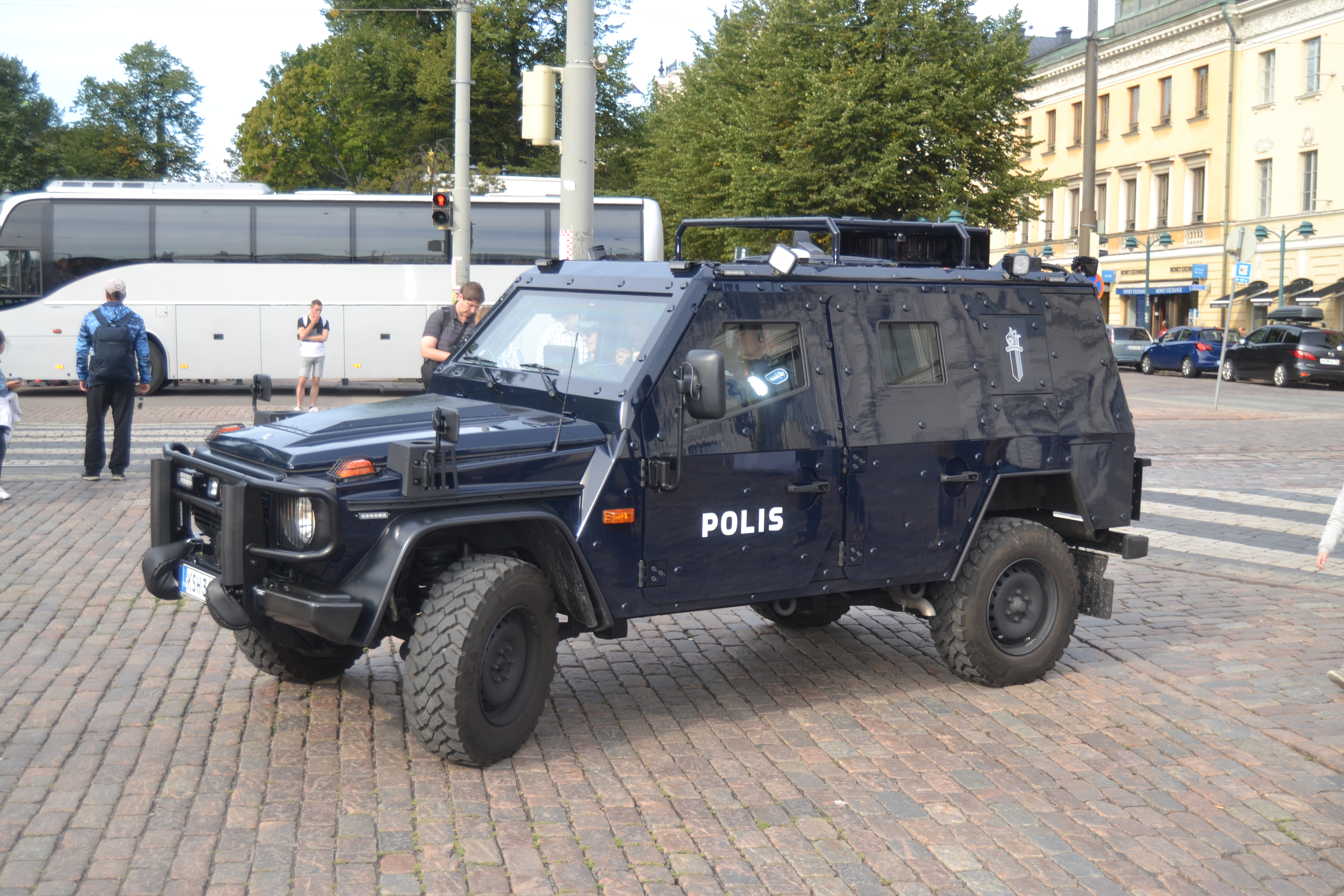
Mercedes-Benz G280 LAPV Enok

==== Current vehicles of the Finnish police ====
- Ford Kuga (unmarked)
- Ford Focus (unmarked police cars)
- Audi A8 (unmarked)
- Mercedes-Benz E-class (unmarked units in Helsinki. Used mostly as escort cars)
- BMW 7 series (used mostly as unmarked escort cars for the President of Finland)
- Citroën Berlingo (used as mobile speed camera units in Helsinki)
- Ford Mondeo (2012–2018 models)
- Ford Ranger (unmarked, in use in Helsinki)
- Ford Transit (used as material transport by Espoo department and one in Kristinestad, used also by Bear Squad)
- Opel Vectra (not in use, stored as reserve vehicles)
- Opel Movano (unmarked, used by Pohjanmaa departments and Bear Squad)
- Škoda Octavia (2013–2018 models, including Skoda octavia VRS and -scout)
- Škoda Superb (2017– models, including Škoda superb sportline)
- Ford Tourneo Connect (used as mobile speed camera cars and also used unmarked in Helsinki)
- Toyota Avensis
- Toyota Corolla Verso (unmarked police cars used in the Helsinki region)
- Mitsubishi Outlander (in use as unmarked backup cars in Helsinki)
- Mitsubishi Pajero (unmarked cars in Helsinki)
- Toyota Land Cruiser (Used by Bear Squad)
- Toyota Hilux (unmarked police cars in Rovaniemi, also used by Bear Squad)
- Toyota Prius (in use at the Turku department)
- Nissan Navara (unmarked police cars, mostly in use for personnel transport in Helsinki)
- Nissan Primastar (unmarked, mostly used as a backup in emergency situations around Helsinki)
- Nissan Qashqai (unmarked)
- Volkswagen Passat (regular-, alltrack- and r-line models)
- Volkswagen Caddy (mobile speed camera units and unmarked police cars)
- Volkswagen Tiguan (unmarked police vehicles. Including VW Tiguan R-Line)
- Volkswagen Golf Variant (used as unmarked police cars)
- Volkswagen E-Golf (in use in Helsinki)
- Volkswagen Transporter (different variants, for example, K9, office and LGV monitoring units)
- Mercedes-Benz Sprinter (LGV monitoring and riot control capabilities)
- Mercedes-Benz G-Class (used by Bear Squad)
- Mercedes-Benz G280 LAPV Enok (used by Bear Squad)
- Mercedes-Benz CLS
- Volvo V70
- Ford Focus ST
- Mercedes-Benz Vito (2019–)
- Hyundai Ioniq electric (unmarked)
- Volkswagen Touran (unmarked)
- BMW 5 series
- Volvo S90
- Toyota RAV4

Marked police motorcycles are usually either BMW K1200 RS, Yamaha FJR 1300, Yamaha FZ1, Yamaha XT660, Kawasaki Ninja H2, Honda VFR1200 or KTM 1190 Adventure models. Unmarked motorcycles are Yamaha YZF1000R Thunderace- and Yamaha YZF-R1 models. Motorcycles are used in pursuit situations. The quad bikes are also used in service, mostly used are Polaris Sportsman and Can-Am Outlander.

Additionally, Finnish police operates snowmobiles, water scooters and boats. Helsinki department also has a mounted police unit.

== See also ==
- Law enforcement in Finland
- Law enforcement in Åland
