= Ministry of the Interior (Finland) =

Government ministry of Finland

- Finnish: sisäministeriö Swedish: inrikesministeriet

Ministry overview
- Jurisdiction: Finnish Government
- Headquarters: Kirkkokatu 12, Helsinki
- Minister responsible: Mari Rantanen
- Ministry executive: Päivi Nerg

The Ministry of the Interior (Finnish: sisäministeriö, Swedish: inrikesministeriet) is one of the Finnish Government's twelve ministries and is responsible for matters related to internal security such as counter-terrorism, policing, fire & rescue services, and border control, as well as migration issues. The ministry is also responsible for matters relating to the flag of Finland and the coats of arms. The ministry is led by the Minister of the Interior, Mari Rantanen of the Finns Party.

The Ministry of the Interior's budget for 2018 is €1,463,996,000. The ministry employs 190 people.
