= List of youngest killers =

Throughout history, there have been instances of children intentionally killing other individuals, with a majority of these cases occurring in the United States. Some children have not been charged with murder, as the minimum age of criminal responsibility varies depending on the country and location; for instance, children must be at least ten years old to be judged in the United Kingdom or in certain states in the United States, such as Wisconsin.

== List ==
The following is a list of children who have been confirmed by reliable sources to have deliberately killed another human being, during which they were documented to be younger than age 13.

Killings in which the perpetrator was under the age of 13, with relevant details
Name	Age at time of killing(s)	Date of killing(s)	Location	Killed	Injured	Note(s) and citation(s)
Unnamed girl	3 years	April 11, 1906	Benwood, West Virginia, United States	1	0	She attacked a two-month-old neighbor while the adults were away. According to reports, the girl took a butcher knife and inflicted multiple severe wounds, including cuts to the face and body, killing the baby.
Retta McCabe	4 years	October 30, 1897	Troy, New York, United States	1	0	McCabe was prone to outbursts of agitation during which she would assault others and herself. She struck her younger brother, who succumbed to his wounds weeks later.
Unnamed boy	4 years	April 2012	Saudi Arabia	1	0	He shot his father in the head with his father's gun—allegedly because his father would not buy him a PlayStation console—in Jizan. The Saudi press dubbed him the youngest killer in the history of Saudi Arabia.
Unnamed boy	5 years	October 15, 1994	Trondheim, Norway	1	0	They attacked five-year-old Silje Redergård while playing in the snow. After beating her and leaving her in the cold, they ran away, leaving her to die. A few years later, a subsequent investigation cast doubt on their involvement, suggesting that older teenagers might have been responsible. The case remains unsolved.
Unnamed boy	6 years	October 15, 1994	Trondheim, Norway	1	0	They attacked five-year-old Silje Redergård while playing in the snow. After beating her and leaving her in the cold, they ran away, leaving her to die. A few years later, a subsequent investigation cast doubt on their involvement, suggesting that older teenagers might have been responsible. The case remains unsolved.
Carl Newton Mahan	6 years	May 18, 1929	Paintsville, Kentucky, United States	1	0	Mahan shot eight-year-old Cecil Van Hoose. He was sentenced to 15 years in a reformatory, but his sentence was later overturned.
Unnamed boy	6 years	February 29, 2000	Mount Morris Township, Michigan, United States	1	0	An unnamed boy shot his six-year-old classmate, Kayla Rolland, at Buell Elementary School. The gun owner, a friend of the family who lived with the boy, was charged with involuntary manslaughter.
Lizzie Cook	6 years	February 27, 1899	Birmingham, Alabama, United States	1	0	Cook intentionally set her two-year-old brother's clothes on fire while she was babysitting. The fire burned through the fabric and he died.
Unnamed boy	6 years	June 2, 1910	Oslo, Norway	1	0	
Unnamed Boy	7 years	May 18, 2008	Argentina	1	0	Together with his 9-year-old brother, he abducted a 2-year-old girl named Milagros Belizán; after taking her to a remote location, they tied her up, beat her, and suffocated her to death.
Unnamed Girl	7 years	February 22, 2015	Potiskum, Nigeria	7	19+	She entered the market in the city of Potiskum and detonated explosives
Unnamed boy	7 years	December 4, 2022	Curacautín, Chile	1	0	He fatally shot a friend with an air rifle. He was not charged due to his age, although his parents, both policemen who had taught him how to use air guns, were convicted of negligent homicide and sentenced to 300 days' imprisonment.
Unnamed boy	7 years	January 2022	Smiley, Texas, United States	1	0	He shot 32-year-old Brandon Rasberry. He was not charged due to his age, but was instead sent to a psychiatric hospital.
Virginia Hudson	7 years	July 23, 1887	Butler Township, South Carolina, United States	1	0	Hudson beat a one-year-old child to death with a board. She was charged with murder.
Robert Robertson	7 years, 6 months	June 1907	Forest, Tasmania, Australia	1	0	Robertson beat his two-year-old brother with a piece of wood while he was babysitting. He was charged with murder, then put into state care.
Amarjeet Sada	8 years	2007	Begusarai, India	3	0	He killed his eight-month-old sister, his nine-month-old cousin, and an unrelated six-month-old baby. He was not charged due to his age, but instead sent to a remand home in Munger.
Henry Chibueze	12 years	1993	Imo State, Nigeria	1	0	A Serial Killer accused of 200+ Murders. He first killed at 12 during a fight with a fellow pupil at Umuokpu Community Primary School.
Unnamed girl	8 years	July 4, 1867	Cassville, Missouri, United States	1	0	She killed her four-year-old brother and was declared insane.
Unnamed boy	8 years	February 7, 2014	Padre Hurtado, Chile	1	0	He stabbed his seven-year-old cousin. He was not charged due to his age.
Patrick Knowles	8 years	May 1903	Stockton-on-Tees, England, United Kingdom	1	2	Knowles buried one-year-old Frederick Hughes, who died of suffocation. Knowles also attempted to drown one-year-old Fanny Lynas, as well as burying another child. He served nine years in prison under His Majesty's pleasure.
Unnamed boy	8 years, 10 months	November 5, 2008	St. Johns, Arizona, United States	2	0	He shot his 29-year-old father, Vincent Romero, and his father's coworker. He was arrested and pled guilty to negligent homicide. He was sentenced to an indefinite stay at a youth treatment center near Phoenix. He later moved to a group home and then a foster home.
Carroll Cole	8 years	1947	Richmond, California, United States	1	0	Cole drowned an eight-year-old boy. The murder was initially ruled an accident until he confessed in adulthood after killing five women. He was executed by lethal injection on December 6, 1985.
Mary Cooper	9 years	1885	Scottsville, Virginia, United States	1	0	Cooper hung and beat her seven-year-old cousin Melville Barrett.
Unnamed boy	9 years	May 6, 2019	Fawn River Township, Michigan, United States	1	0	He shot his 51-year-old adoptive mother.
Cayetano Santos Godino	9 years, 4 months, 29 days – 16 years, 1 month, 3 days	March 29, 1906 – December 3, 1912	Buenos Aires, Argentina	4	0	The first murder was not discovered until Santos Godino later confessed. He was arrested several times.
Unnamed boy	10 years	September 2022	Haicheng Township, China	1	0	He strangled his grandmother to death on video after she slapped him.
Noah Q. Mann-Tate	10 years	November 21, 2022	Milwaukee, Wisconsin, United States	1	0	He shot and killed his mother.
Unnamed girl (referred to as "A. F.")	10 years	October 30, 2018	Chippewa Falls, Wisconsin, United States	1	0	Killed six-month-old Jaxon Hunter. Her case was moved to juvenile court in 2019.
William York	10 years	May 13, 1748	Eyke, England, United Kingdom	1	0	York attacked five-year-old Susan Matthew with a knife, killing her. He was sentenced to death, but later pardoned.
Hubbard Harrell	10 years	February 3, 1888	Savannah, Georgia, United States	3	0	Harrell burned his six-year-old nephew and two unrelated children with boiling water.
James Osmanson	10 years	April 12, 1994	Butte, Montana, United States	1	0	Osmanson shot his 11-year-old classmate Jeremy Bullock at Margaret Leary Elementary School. He was sent to a residential treatment facility.
Joseph McVay	10 years	January 2, 2011	Big Prairie, Ohio, United States	1	0	McVay shot his 46-year-old mother Deborah McVay. He was charged with "delinquency by virtue of committing murder." He was sentenced to a juvenile detention center, then a residential treatment facility.
Unnamed girl	10 years	September 18, 2010	Sandy Springs, Georgia, United States	1	0	She beat two-year-old Zyda White, who she was babysitting. White fell unconscious and later died.
Jane Walker	10 years	1886	Aiken County, South Carolina, United States	1	0	Walker poisoned the younger relative she was babysitting. She was charged with murder.
James Arcene	10 years	1872	Fort Gibson, Oklahoma, United States	1	0	Arcene, alongside a man named William Parchmeal, shot and beat William Feigel. Arcene was convicted of robbery and murder, then executed.
Robert Thompson	10 years, 5 months, 20 days	February 12, 1993	Liverpool, England, United Kingdom	1	0	Thompson and Venables abducted two-year-old James Bulger from a shopping center in Bootle. They tortured Bulger before laying him across railway tracks, where he was hit by a train. They both spent eight years in a young offenders' institution. In 2017, Venables was re-incarcerated for possessing Child pornography.
Jon Venables	10 years, 5 months, 30 days	February 12, 1993	Liverpool, England, United Kingdom	1	0	Thompson and Venables abducted two-year-old James Bulger from a shopping center in Bootle. They tortured Bulger before laying him across railway tracks, where he was hit by a train. They both spent eight years in a young offenders' institution. In 2017, Venables was re-incarcerated for possessing Child pornography.
Unnamed boy	10 years	August 21, 2013	Broadview, Saskatchewan, Canada	1	0	He beat six-year-old Lee Bonneau to death. He was not charged due to his age.
Joseph Hall	10 years, 10 months, 12 days	May 1, 2011	Riverside, California, United States	1	0	Hall shot his 32-year-old father, neo-Nazi leader Jeff Hall. He was sentenced to juvenile detention until the age of 23. His stepmother Krista McCary was charged with criminal storage of firearms and child neglect.
Mary Bell	10 years, 11 months, 30 days – 11 years, 1 month, 7 days	May 25, 1968 – July 31, 1968	Newcastle upon Tyne, England, United Kingdom	2	0	Bell strangled four-year-old Martin Brown and three-year-old Brian Howe, killing them both. She served 12 years in prison under Her Majesty's pleasure.
Anton Wood	11 years	November 1892	Denver, Colorado, United States	1	0	Wood shot Joseph Smith. He was charged with second-degree murder and sentenced to either 25 years of hard labor or life in prison.
Nellie Cornelison	11 years	January 15, 1902	Wichita, Kansas, United States	1	0	Cornelison slit the throat of her sister Laura Cornelison. She was not charged due to her age.
Nathaniel Jamar Abraham	11 years, 9 months, 10 days	October 29, 1997	Pontiac, Michigan, United States	1	0	Abraham shot an 18-year-old man. He was tried as an adult and convicted of second-degree murder.
Andrew Golden	11 years, 9 months, 27 days	March 24, 1998	Jonesboro, Arkansas, United States	5	10	Golden, alongside 13-year-old Mitchell Johnson, shot one of their teachers and four of their classmates at Westside Middle School. They were both imprisoned until the age of 21, with Golden serving 9 years and 2 months.
Unnamed girl	11 years	June 1, 2004	Sasebo, Japan	1	0	She killed her 12-year-old classmate Satomi Mitari at Okubo Elementary School. She was not charged, instead being institutionalized in a reformatory.
José Ángel Ramos Betts	11 years	January 10, 2020	Torreón, Mexico	1	6	An 11 year old student opened fire at the facilities of Colegio Cervantes Campus Bosque killing 1 and injuring 6 before turning the gun on himself.
Clayton Dietz	11 years	January 13, 2026	Perry, Pennsylvania, United States	1	0	An 11-year-old boy accused of shooting his stepfather on his birthday.
Unnamed boy	11 years	September 15, 2016	Changde, China	1	0	Suspect Xiong strangled Beibei to death following a physical altercation triggered by an argument while playing.
Unnamed girl	12 years	January 2023	Tulsa, Oklahoma, United States	1	0	Stabbed her nine-year-old brother to death.
Nathan Daniel Faris	12 years	March 2, 1987	De Kalb, Missouri, United States	1	0	Faris shot his 13-year-old classmate Timothy Perrin at De Kalb High School. He then committed suicide.
Unnamed boy	12 years	January 2000	Bristol, England, United Kingdom	1	0	He stabbed his six-month-old brother, cutting off his left hand. He was charged with manslaughter but found unfit to stand trial.
Piedad Martínez del Águila	12 years	December 4, 1965 – January 4, 1966	Murcia, Spain	4	0	Piedad Martínez del Águila poisoned four of her siblings.
Mary Maher	12 years	August 21 – September 8, 1906	Dunkitt, County Kilkenny, Ireland	3	1	Maher poisoned her three sisters. She then committed suicide.
Jose Reyes	12 years, 3 months, 19 days	October 21, 2013	Sparks, Nevada, United States	1	2	Reyes shot one of his classmates and one of his teachers at Sparks Middle School. He then committed suicide.
Lionel Tate	12 years, 5 months, 28 days	July 28, 1999	Broward County, Florida, United States	1	0	Tate battered his six-year-old cousin Tiffany Eunick to death. He was charged with first-degree murder and sentenced to life in prison. The sentence was later reduced to one year of house arrest and 10 years of probation. As an adult he was sentenced to 30 years imprisonment for armed robbery.
Kristen Pittman	12 years, 7 months, 19 days	November 28, 2001	Chester, South Carolina, United States	2	0	Pittman shot her grandparents. She was tried as an adult and sentenced to 30 years in prison. Her sentence was later reduced by five years.
Hannah Ocuish	12 years, 9 months	July 21, 1786	New London, Connecticut, United States	1	0	Ocuish's guilt is disputed. She was hanged for the murder of six-year-old Eunice Bolles.
Evan Savoie	12 years, 3 months, 24 days	February 15, 2003	Ephrata, Washington, United States	1	0	Savoie and Eakin stabbed and beat their 13-year-old friend Craig Sorger to death. Savoie was convicted of first-degree murder and Eakin was convicted of second-degree murder. Both Savoie and Eakin have since been released.
Jake Eakin	12 years, 3 months, 1 day	February 15, 2003	Ephrata, Washington, United States	1	0	Savoie and Eakin stabbed and beat their 13-year-old friend Craig Sorger to death. Savoie was convicted of first-degree murder and Eakin was convicted of second-degree murder. Both Savoie and Eakin have since been released.
Jasmine Richardson	12 years, 6 months, 2 days	April 23, 2006	Medicine Hat, Alberta, Canada	3	0	Richardson and her 23-year-old boyfriend Jeremy Steinke stabbed three of her family members. Richardson was charged with first-degree murder. In 2020 her criminal record was expunged.
Unnamed boy	12 years	December 2, 2018	Yuanjiang, China	1	0	He stabbed his mother. He was not charged due to his age.
Unnamed boy	12 years	April 13, 2012	Hengyang, China	3	0	A 12-year-old boy killed three members of his aunt's family with a fruit knife.
Unnamed boy	12 years	December 19, 2016	Huichang, China	1	0	A 12-year-old boy stabbed a classmate.
Unnamed boy	12 years	January 21, 2013	Dorval, Quebec, Canada	1	0	The boy shot and killed his brother. He was sentenced to two years' probation.
Curtis Jones	12 years, 1 month and 6 days	January 6, 1999	Port St. John, Florida, United States	1	0	Jones and his 13-year-old sister Catherine Jones were charged with second-degree murder. They were both sentenced to 17 years in prison.
Unnamed Afghan boy	12 Years	June 9, 2010	Nadahan, Afghanistan	40+	80	The Bomber walked into a wedding party and detonated his explosives.
Unnamed boy	12 years	September 29, 2019	São Paulo, Brazil	1	0	He was sentenced to three years in prison.
Alex King	12 years	November 26, 2001	Cantonment, Florida, United States	1	0	King and his 13-year-old brother Derek King killed their father. Alex served six years of his eight-year sentence.
Danny Preddie	12 years	November 27, 2000	London, United Kingdom	1	0	Preddie and his 13-year-old brother Ricky Preddie attacked 10-year-old Damilola Taylor with a glass bottle. Danny was sentenced to eight years in prison, but served four additional years for violating his parole.
Unnamed girl	12 years	July 15, 2024	Humboldt, Tennessee, United States	1	0	She smothered her eight-year-old cousin. She was charged with murder and tampering with evidence.
Unnamed boy	12 years	October 18, 2019	Curitiba, Brazil	1	0	He stabbed an elderly woman and was temporarily detained for 45 days.
Howard Lang	12 years	November 18, 1947	Chicago, Illinois, United States	1	0	Lang killed seven-year-old Lonnie Fellick. He was sentenced to 22 years in prison. His sentence was later overturned due to his age. This case was cited in Frederic Wertham's Seduction of the Innocent.
Edwin Carl Debrow Jr.	12 years	September 21, 1991	San Antonio, Texas, United States	1	0	Debrow shot a man. He was sentenced to 27 years in prison and released in 2019.
Bailey Kurariki	12 years, 3 months, 28 days	September 12, 2001	Papakura, New Zealand	1	0	Kurariki killed 40-year-old Michael Choy alongside seven accomplices. He was charged with manslaughter and released on parole in 2008. In 2011, he was sentenced to 14 months in prison for assault and domestic violence.
Jonah Louis Iverson	12 years	August 29, 1995	Laredo, Texas, United States	1	0	Iverson shot his 12-year-old classmate Lizzy Rivera at Memorial Middle School. He served ten years, firstly in a Texas Youth Commission facility and then in a state prison.
Unnamed boy	12 years	April 2, 2024	Vantaa, Finland	1	2	He shot three of his classmates with a revolver, killing one.
Cristian Fernandez	12 years, 2 months	March 12, 2011	Jacksonville, Florida, United States	1	0	Fernandez beat his 2-year-old half-brother David Galarraga to death. He was convicted of manslaughter and released one day after his nineteenth birthday in 2018.
Sharon Carr	12 years, 5 months, 17 days	June 7, 1992	Camberley, England, United Kingdom	1	0	Carr stabbed 18-year-old Katie Rackliff in a random attack. She was sentenced to life imprisonment with a minimum tariff of 14 years and is still in custody.
Unnamed boy	12 years	June 17, 2002	Wissous, France	1	0	A man and his son confronted security guard Maurice Jean-Joseph and attacked him for allegedly harassing the son's sister. After the man struck Jean-Joseph, the boy fatally stabbed him. The boy was unable to be charged due to his age.
Isiah Fowler	12 years	April 27, 2013	Valley Springs, California, United States	1	0	Fowler stabbed his sister Leila to death at their home. He successfully appealed his murder conviction in 2018, but was again found guilty in a second trial. He was paroled in 2023.
Ayden Merrell	12 years	February 2, 2017	Fouke, Arkansas, United States	1	0	Merrell shot convenience store clerk Christa Shockley during a robbery. He was sentenced to life imprisonment with the possibility of parole after 30 years.
Unnamed boy	12 years	May 14, 2023	Keene, Texas, United States	1	0	He shot and killed Sonic Drive-In employee Matthew Davis after an argument ensued between the boy's uncle and Davis. The boy was sentenced to 12 years in prison, while his aunt, who gave him a rifle and told him to shoot Davis, was sentenced to 25 years in prison.
Unnamed boy	12 years	November 13, 2023	Wolverhampton, England, United Kingdom	1	0	Two boys stabbed 19-year-old Shawn Seesahai during a confrontation. Both were sentenced to be detained at His Majesty's pleasure.
Unnamed boy	12 years	November 13, 2023	Wolverhampton, England, United Kingdom	1	0	Two boys stabbed 19-year-old Shawn Seesahai during a confrontation. Both were sentenced to be detained at His Majesty's pleasure.
Unnamed girl	12 years	December 15, 2025	Jelenia Góra, Poland	1	0	She stabbed her 11-year-old schoolmate.
Unnamed girl	12 years	March 11, 2023	Freudenberg, Germany	1	0	Together with her 13-year-old friend, she stabbed her 12-year-old friend, Luise F.

== See also ==
- Age of criminal responsibility
- Capital punishment for juveniles in the United States
- Gun violence in the United States
- Gun violence in U.S. schools
- Murder in United States law
- Trial as an adult
