= List of attacks related to primary schools =

These are attacks that have occurred on school property or related primarily to school issues or events. A narrow definition of attack is used for this list to exclude attacks during warfare, robberies, gang violence, political or police attacks (as related to protests), accidents, single suicides, and murder-suicides by rejected spouses or suitors, as they are not the type of mass murder event that is the focus of concern. Incidents that involved only staff who work at the school have been classified as belonging at list of workplace spree killings. It also excludes events where no injuries take place, if an attack is foiled. Accounts without reliable sources are excluded.

== Primary school and kindergarten incidents ==
Date	Location	Attacker(s)	Dead	Injured	Description
August 16, 1856	Florence, Alabama, United States		2		The school master warned his students not to harm his tame sparrow. One boy stepped on the bird and killed it. Days later when the boy returned to school, the master took him into a private room and strangled him. The boy's father went to the school and shot the schoolmaster dead.
February 6, 1864	Ashland County, Ohio, United States	George W. Longfelt	1		The school teacher of the Pyfer's School House, George W. Longfelt, shot and killed student Alfred Desem, and fled.
February 16, 1867	Knights Ferry, California, United States		2		Mr. McGinnis was shot and killed by his daughter's teacher, Mr. George T. Cheshire, after McGinnis threatened the teacher for expelling his daughter from school. When McGinnis's son learned of this, he went to the school and killed the teacher.
June 8, 1867	New York City, New York, United States	Arthur Day, 13		1	At Public School No. 18, 13-year-old Arthur Day brought a loaded pistol, and shot and injured classmate Robert Morton.
December 22, 1868	Chattanooga, Tennessee, United States		3		A boy who refused to be whipped and left school, returning with his brother and a friend the next day to seek revenge on his teacher. They went to his house and engaged in a gun battle, which resulted in three dead. Only the brother of the first boy survived.
February 11, 1873	Wisconsin, United States			1	A father shot the school mistress for whipping his son.
December 1, 1881	Santa Monica, California, United States	Mr. Williams	1		While working late on the program for the children's concert at the school house, the school master O'Donnell, and the father of the Williams boy got into an argument. The Williams parent fatally shot O'Donnell in the back.
December 22, 1881	Shelby County, Indiana, United States	Charles J. Gregory		1	Charles J. Gregory, a school teacher, shot at a pupil at close range because he refused to write on a slate. The teacher was arrested.
February 28, 1884	Danville, Virginia, United States	Allen Wamack, 15		2	As Allen Wamack, a fifteen-year-old boy drove by a "negro" school house, he called out "school butter." The entire school emptied out and attacked him, several shots were fired at him, and he returned fire shooting two students.
June 12, 1887	Cleveland, Tennessee, United States	Will Guess	1		Will Guess went to the school and fatally shot Miss Irene Fann, teacher of his little sister, for whipping the girl the day before.
April 24, 1890	Brazil, Indiana, United States	Ben Corbery		1	While the pupils of the Meridian Street School were playing, student Ben Corbery drew a revolver and shot Cora Brubach, aged 10, seriously wounding her in the face. The girl had earlier informed the teacher of Ben's misconduct.
March 21, 1891	Liberty, Mississippi, United States			14	During a school exhibition and concert given at the Parson Hill schoolhouse, the large, mixed audience had both black and white attendees: teachers, pupils, and spectators. An unknown assailant fired a double barreled shotgun into the crowd, wounding 14 people, some seriously.
April 9, 1891	Newburgh, New York, United States	James Foster, 70		5	70-year-old James Foster fired a shotgun at a group of male students in the playground of St. Mary's Parochial School, causing minor injuries to several.
December 12, 1898	Charleston, West Virginia, United States		6	2+	During the School exhibition, a group of young men attempted to break up a student performance. The teacher Fisher tried to throw the trouble makers out, but the group turned on him. Several of the audience members jumped up to assist and a free-for-all fight broke out. Harry Flasher was shot in the heart and instantly killed, Henry Carney was fatally shot in the back, Ralph Jones and two others were also fatally shot, and Haz Harding had his skull crushed. George Gibson was shot in the hand, and several others received minor wounds.
December 21, 1898	New York City, New York, United States	Samuel Jacobson, 8		1	Samuel Jacobson, student at Grammar School 85, stabbed his 8-year-old classmate Hans Pietze with a pocketknife after he fell over the latter's foot. Both students were said to have quarreled often before.
October 6, 1902	Droyssig, Austria-Hungary	..., 40	4	3	A schoolmaster shot and killed three children and injured another three, before he was lynched by infuriated villagers.
September 27, 1904	Mount Ayr, Iowa, United States	Samuel Égly	1		Two school directors got into a heated discussion over school business. When Director Samuel Egly threatened Director William Kling with an ax, Kling shot Egly through the head and killed him.
March 23, 1907	Carmi, Illinois, United States	George Nicholson	1		George Nicholson shot and killed John Kurd at a schoolhouse outside of Carmi, Illinois during a school rehearsal. Kurd had made a disparaging remark about Nicholson's daughter during her recital.
September 11, 1909	Gravette, Arkansas, United States	John Butram	1		John Butram, an unruly student at the Bear Hollow School, said that school is canceled. When the teacher, A. T. Kelly, insisted that the day's lesson was not over, Butram drew his knife. The teacher shot him in self-defense.
January 12, 1910	New York City, New York, United States		2		"A black bearded maniac drew an automatic pistol" and fired five shots into a crowd of Harlem School boys who were taunting him. He hit Robert Lomas, aged 6, in the heart and the boy died instantly; Arthur Shively, aged 6, was shot through the left lung and critically wounded.. Shively (also spelled "Shibley" in some sources) died of his injuries eight days later.
June 20, 1913	Bremen, Germany	Heinz Schmidt, 30	5	23	Bremen school shooting: 30-year-old unemployed teacher Heinz Schmidt entered St.-Marien-Schule and indiscriminately shot at students and teachers, killing four students and injuring 23 other people. Another student died from injuries sustained when she fell downstairs while trying to escape the shooting. A furious crowd outside the school eventually subdued Schmidt, and he was arrested by police.
September 22, 1916	Bemidji, Minnesota, United States			1	Miss Olga Dahl, the 19-year-old teacher at the Round Lake District School, was found tied to a tree near the school, assaulted, and shot twice in the face. She had been working late the night before after all the pupils had left, when a man with a revolver entered the school house and ordered her to keep quiet and obey him. She was not expected to live, and all available men in Itasca County joined in the hunt for the assailant. A $250 (equivalent to $7,397 in 2025) reward was offered. A man answering his description was later caught in Black Duck, Minnesota.
December 26, 1916	Danville, Kentucky, United States	Thomas Thornton	1	3	During the Christmas tree celebration at the Harris Creek School attended by children and visitors, a fight broke out. William Benedict, Sr. was instantly shot dead; William Benedict, Jr. was shot in the ankle; Bourdon Galloway was shot in the right arm; and Mike Gaddis was shot in the leg. Many others were injured by diving out windows and ducking under seats. Thomas Thornton was reported to have been drinking and been told to calm down Benedict; Thomas' brother George gave him a revolver.
October 28, 1917	Chicago, Illinois, United States	William Carter, 16; Ralph Carter, 15		1	Overnight, two brothers, William (16) and Ralph Carter (15), broke into the May public school, robbing the phone boxes and teachers' desks. When they were discovered by Howard Parks, the janitor, and Thomas Conway, a policeman, a gun battle broke out and William Carter was shot. He was taken to the hospital and was not expected to live, and his brother Ralph was taken to jail.
November 29, 1917	Manes, Missouri, United States			1	On his way to attend the Perkins school's Thanksgiving night pie supper, teacher Joe Todd, age 21, was mysteriously shot. The bullet passed through his body, but he was expected to recover. Possibly an accidental shooting, as a number of people had been drinking at the supper and had let off some wild shots.
October 22, 1920	Chicago, Illinois, United States	Carmila Rindoni		1	Mrs. Carmila Rindoni, went to the school and shot Miss Rosalind I. Reynolds, her son's teacher, twice for spanking her son the day before. Mrs. Rindoni was arrested, and Reynolds was expected to recover.
February 17, 1922	Valdosta, Georgia, United States	John Glover	2		John Glover broke into the school house and shot and killed a school girl and fatally wounded a boy. A mob was formed and tracked and killed Glover 7 miles (11 km) away in Indianola, now Naylor, Georgia.
October 19, 1923	Waikino, New Zealand	John Christopher Higgins	2	8	Waikino school shooting: John Higgins, a middle-aged firewood dealer from Canada, was seeking revenge for the alleged killing of three of his horses by other Waikino residents. He entered the local public school armed with a revolver, knife and explosives. He shot headmaster Robert Reid, and went to the classroom, where he fatally shot two boys, aged 9 and 13 years, wounding four other pupils by gunshots. Two children were injured while trying to escape. Higgins was arrested after a shoot-out with police in which he wounded a policeman. He was convicted and sentenced to death four months later; his sentence was commuted to life imprisonment, as it was found that he had been insane at the time of the shooting.
May 18, 1927	Bath, Michigan, United States	Andrew Kehoe, 55	44	58	Bath School disaster: School board member Andrew Kehoe set up a series of bombs within the Bath Consolidated School. Before blowing up the school, Kehoe murdered his wife and set fire to his farmhouse. As townspeople responding to the explosions at the school started relief efforts, Kehoe detonated his shrapnel-filled vehicle outside the school and killed himself, injuring more persons. The bombings constituted the deadliest act of mass murder in any type of school setting in U.S. history.
May 25, 1927	Švenčionys,Poland	unknown man	0		An unknown individual threw a hand grenade through the window of the primary school in the village of Rymszańce, and it exploded immediately. Fortunately, there were no children in the room at the time, so no one was injured.
1 April 1936	Janikowo, Poland	Stefan Bykowski, 36	2	2	36-year-old Stefan Bykowski, retired a teacher and reserve officer, was dismissed from his position after the Labour Inspectorate issued a negative assessment of his work. He was informed of the decision by the school principal, Jan Wojciechowski. After leaving the school, Bykowski returned in the evening, when he first shot from browning and killed the 33-year-old teacher Michalina Kosmowska, and then the school 26-year-old servant Pelagia Zalita. When police officer Stefan Strzelczak was wounded during the incident, Bykowski attempted to commit suicide, but the attempt was unsuccessful. After his release from prison on 24 September, and following five months of psychiatric examinations, the court decided to place Bykowski in a psychiatric hospital for the mentally ill. As a result, he was admitted to the psychiatric institution on 29 September in Owińska. Two months later, on 29 November, he was retired from active service.
October 25, 1940	Cincinnati, Ohio, United States	Guy Willie Ponder, 27	1		10-year-old Clarence Stevens, a third-grade pupil at Holy Name School, was stabbed to death inside a storeroom at the school by 27-year-old Guy Willie Ponder.
May 9, 1944	New York City, New York, United States	Madeline Kirkland, 11 Eileen Foster, 13	1		Nine-year-old Margaret Patton was attacked and killed at PS 119 in Harlem by two fellow students. One stabbed her to death. Police arrested 11-year-old Madeline Kirkland, who was charged with murder, and 13-year-old Eileen Foster, who was charged with juvenile delinquency as her accessory.
October 10, 1956	Terrazzano, Italy	Arturo Santato, 23 Egidio Santato, 21	1	4	Arturo Santato, a former inmate of an asylum in Aversa, and his brother Egidio went into a school in Terrazzano, near Milan, carrying guns, dynamite and acid. They took 96 children and three teachers hostage for about six hours. They demanded 200 million lire for the release of their hostages or they would kill them. Using the children as shields, they fired shots at people outside the school, killing one person and injuring another three. The hostage crisis ended when one teacher tackled Egidio, grabbed a knife and stabbed him in the head. The attack distracted the brothers long enough so that police could storm the classroom without endangering the children's lives.
November 4, 1957	Zelów, Poland	Tadeusz Byjoch, 42	1	11	42-year-old Tadeusz Byjoch, the principal of Primary School No. 1, left his apartment in the school building one morning before 8:00 a.m. wearing striped pajamas, with disheveled gray hair, barefoot, and carrying an axe. On the ground floor, Byjoch approached 14-year-old student Roman Gapnik, who was returning from the bathroom and heading to class, and struck him twice in the head with the axe. He then went to the first floor, where he struck one student in the head in the corridor. In the classroom of Grade VII A, he injured three girls, including Janina Konieczna. In the next classroom, Grade V B, two girls and one boy were injured. Byjoch attempted to enter another classroom, but the students barricaded the door. He then encountered a teacher in the corridor. Priest Józef Stanek intervened and lured Byjoch into a bathroom, where Stanek was hit in the forearm and bitten on the cheek. Byjoch attempted to strike the priest in the head, but failed. Stanek then took the axe from Byjoch and gave it to another man. Disarmed, Byjoch brutally beat a Russian teacher and a school caretaker before exiting to the school courtyard. He began moving toward students who had fled the building but was subdued by a group of men. Byjoch was arrested and taken to a psychiatric hospital, from which he was released in 1962. He was declared legally insane. The motive was determined to be his mental state following a separation from his wife.
September 15, 1959	Houston, Texas, United States	Paul Harold Orgeron, 49	6	19	After Paul Orgeron's second-grade son was denied enrollment at Poe Elementary School, he detonated an explosive on the playground, killing himself, his son Dusty, a teacher, a custodian and two seven-year-old boys. The school principal and 18 students aged six to ten were injured, many seriously.
February 2, 1960	Hartford City, Indiana, United States	Leonard O. Redden, 44	3		Principal Leonard Redden shot and killed two teachers with a shotgun at William Reed Elementary School in Hartford City, Indiana, before fleeing into a forest, where he committed suicide.
June 7, 1960	Blaine, Minnesota, United States	Lester Betts, 40	1		Lester Betts, a 40-year-old mail-carrier, and former president of the PTA, went into the office of 33-year-old principal Carson Hammond and shot him to death with a shotgun.
June 11, 1964	Cologne, Germany	Walter Seifert, 42	11	22	Cologne school massacre: Armed with an insecticide sprayer converted into a flamethrower, a lance, and a homemade mace, 42-year-old Walter Seifert entered the Katholische Volksschule in Cologne, Germany, and opened fire on female students playing in the courtyard. He knocked in classroom windows and fired inside. Eight children and two teachers died, and twenty children and two teachers suffered injuries of severe burns. After swallowing poisonous insecticide, Seifert died the following day, while in custody.
November 8, 1971	Grove, Oklahoma, United States	James Underwood	1		Principal T.J. Melton was shot to death by James Underwood, a school custodian. Underwood was charged with first-degree murder but was never tried, as he was ruled mentally unfit for trial. He was committed to a mental hospital, where he died in 1974.
January 17, 1974	Chicago, Illinois, United States	Steven Guy, 14	1	3	14-year-old Steven Guy, apparently angry about being transferred to a social adjustment center, entered Clara W. Barton Elementary School in Chicago with a revolver and a pistol and killed the principal and wounded three others before being stopped after his guns jammed.
October 8, 1975	Angol, Chile	María Jesús Riffo Sandoval	3	40	A 48-year-old school cook poisoned milk and cereal intended for students with arsenic to try and blame it on a different worker, as they were both in love with the same man. She was sentenced to 20 years' imprisonment, and was eventually released after 17 years.
October 10, 1977	San Juan, Trinidad and Tobago		5		A man running through the halls of El Socorro public school killed four children with a machete; while trying to escape, he killed a woman outside the school. He was later arrested by police.
April 26, 1978	Dallas, Texas, United States	..., 56	1		Woodrow Porter, 38, a janitor at Paul Dunbar Elementary School, was shot to death by the 56-year-old grandmother of an 8-year-old who was allegedly earlier spanked by Porter.
January 29, 1979	San Diego, California, United States	Brenda Ann Spencer, 16	2	9	Armed with a rifle, 16-year-old Brenda Ann Spencer opened fire at Cleveland Elementary School, killing two adults and wounding eight children and one police officer. When apprehended after a six-hour stand-off, she said of her motive, "I don't like Mondays. This livens up the day." Spencer was later sentenced to 25 to life on April 4, 1980 and is housed at the California Institution for Women.
March 20, 1980	Dallas, Texas, United States		1		Rosie Pearson, 49, fifth grade teacher, was shot to death in the hallway of J. Leslie Patton School, by an unknown assailant.
June 3, 1982	Shamshuipo, Hong Kong	Li Chihang, 28	5	43	Anne Anne Kindergarten stabbing: After stabbing his mother and sister to death and injuring two bystanders, 28-year-old Li Chihang entered Anne Anne Kindergarten and started stabbing people. He killed four children and injured 40 other people in the attack. Li was arrested after being shot by a police officer. He was found to be insane and was sentenced to committal to a mental institution.
August 13, 1983	Chiang Rai Province, Thailand	Suthat Wannasarn, 43	3	3	43-year-old Suthat Wannasarn attacked children at a nursery school in Chiang Rai Province with a sword and a large stick, killing three and wounded two more. Wannasarn was arrested by police after being shot in the abdomen.
February 24, 1984	Los Angeles, California, United States	Tyrone Mitchell, 28	2	13	49th Street Elementary School shooting: 28-year-old Tyrone Mitchell began shooting from a window at students leaving 49th Street Elementary School across the street in Los Angeles; he used a shotgun and a rifle. He killed 10-year-old Shala Eubanks, mortally wounded passerby Carlos Lopez, and wounded 11 children and a school employee. Mitchell killed himself as police stormed his location. Mitchell had lost his parents, grandmother, brother and four sisters in the Jonestown massacre.
May 16, 1986	Cokeville, Wyoming, United States	David Young; Doris Young	2	79	1986 Cokeville Elementary School hostage crisis: David Young, and his wife Doris Young, took 154 children and adults hostage at Cokeville Elementary School. After a two-and-a-half hour standoff, a gasoline bomb the couple was carrying went off prematurely, injuring Doris Young while David was out of the room. Returning to the room, Young shot his wife and himself, killing both. All the hostages escaped; 79 were later hospitalized with burns and injuries.
May 20, 1988	Winnetka, Illinois, United States	Laurie Dann	1	6	1988 Winnetka attacks: 30-year-old Laurie Dann entered Hubbard Woods Elementary School and shot and killed one boy, Nick Corwin, and wounded two girls and three boys. She then took a family hostage and shot another man, non-fatally, before killing herself.
August 31, 1988	Anderson, South Carolina, United States	Kevin Dean Young, William Bell, John Glenn, Arthur Ray Jones	1		Principal Dennis Ray Hepler, 35, was accosted by three young men outside West Franklin Elementary School. They robbed him of $67 before shooting him to death. Two of the perpetrators were sentenced to death via lethal injection with Kevin Dean Young being executed on November 3, 2000. The third was sentenced to 35 years in prison. A fourth man was convicted as an accessory for driving them from the scene.
September 23, 1988	Chicago, Illinois, United States	Clemmie Henderson, 40	5	2	1988 Chicago shootings. Armed with a pistol, 40-year-old Clemmie Henderson shot two people dead at an auto parts store and wounded a garbage man before entering Montefiore Special Elementary School; there he killed a school custodian and a police officer. He wounded another police officer before he was shot and killed.
September 26, 1988	Greenwood, South Carolina, United States	James William Wilson, 19	2	9	James Wilson, 19, took a pistol to Oakland Elementary School where he shot and killed two students and injured seven other students and two teachers. Wilson was sentenced to death by electric chair.
January 17, 1989	Stockton, California, United States	Patrick Purdy, 24	6	30	Patrick Purdy shot and killed five schoolchildren, and wounded 29 other schoolchildren and one teacher, on the playground of Cleveland Elementary School. The shooting ended with Purdy committing suicide.
January 10, 1994	Maradi, Niger		5	1	A former psychiatric patient, armed with a club, beat four children to death in a madrasah in Maradi, and also killed a woman trying to stop him. Trying to escape, the man was captured and severely beaten by an angry crowd.
April 12, 1994	Butte, Montana, United States	Jason Osmanson, 10	1		10-year-old Jason Osmanson, teased because his parents have AIDS, shot and killed an 11-year-old on the playground of Margaret Leary Elementary School. Osmanson was sent to a private residential treatment center.
July 10, 1995	Meihekou, China	Dong Chi	2	16	An assailant armed with a double-barreled shotgun and garden shears attacked staff and students at a kindergarten in Meihekou, killing a six-year-old girl and wounding 15 other students and a teacher. The assailant, identified as Dong Chi, was shot and killed by police.
March 13, 1996	Dunblane, Scotland	Thomas Hamilton, 43	18	15	Unemployed former shopkeeper and Scout leader Thomas Hamilton walked into Dunblane Primary School armed with two pistols and two revolvers. He killed sixteen children and a teacher, and wounded 15 others before committing suicide. The British Government banned handguns in Britain with the Firearms (Amendment) (No. 2) Act 1997.
July 8, 1996	Blakenhall, Wolverhampton, England	Horrett Campbell, 33		7	Wolverhampton machete attack. Horrett Campbell, a 33-year-old man with paranoid schizophrenia, invaded a picnic at St Luke's Primary School and slashed three young children and four adults with a machete. Campbell was later ordered to mental hospital on March 7, 1997.
October 10, 1996	Cairns, Queensland, Australia	Paul Streeton, 26		1	Paul Streeton set six-year-old Tjandamurra O'Shane on fire in the playground of his school, burning over 70% of his body.
August 1998	Henan, China		2	15	A teacher, an ex-soldier, stabbed two children to death and wounded 15 others.
September 3, 1998	Hajdúhadház, Hungary	..., 31		11	A 31-year-old female teacher stabbed eight children and three teachers in the canteen of a primary school in Hajdúhadház.
September 14, 1998	Hejiang County, China	Lin Peiqing		23	Ex-soldier Lin Peiqing stabbed 23 elementary school children during a morning flag-raising ceremony.
February 22, 1999	Gulbene, Latvia	Alexander Koryakov, 19	4	1	Gulbene kindergarten massacre: Nineteen-year-old Alexander Koryakov entered a Gulbene kindergarten and hacked three girls to death with a meat cleaver. He also killed a teacher and wounded a nurse before trying to escape. After his arrest, he told police that he wanted to become famous. Koryakov was sentenced to life imprisonment on December 7, 1999.
May 3, 1999	Costa Mesa, California, United States	Steven Allen Abrams, 39	2	5	Costa Mesa school car attack: Steven Allen Abrams purposefully drove his car onto the playground of Southcoast Early Childhood Learning Center. He killed two children and injured four other children and an adult. Abrams later said he thought the murders would silence the voices the US government was beaming into his brain, he was later sentenced to two life terms in prison without parole on December 15, 2000.
February 29, 2000	Mount Morris Township, Michigan, United States	6-year-old student	1		A student took a pistol to Buell Elementary School from his uncle's home and used it to kill 6-year-old Kayla Rolland.
February 2, 2001	Red Lion, Pennsylvania, United States	William Stankewicz, 55		13	2001 Red Lion machete attack: 55-year-old William Stankewicz entered North Hopewell Winterstown Elementary School and slashed two teachers and a principal with a machete. He wounded several children in a kindergarten before being subdued by a faculty member, he's now serving 132 to 264 years in prison.
April 25, 2001	Czarna Białostocka, Poland	Mariola Myszkiewicz, 38	1		38-year-old Mariola Myszkiewicz, a teacher living in the area, came to Primary School No. 2 in the morning and asked for a key to the medical office, claiming she wanted to use the scale. She later encountered two students and asked them to call 11-year-old Piotr Popławski, who was about to attend an art class. When Popławski entered the room, Myszkiewicz stabbed him approximately twenty times in the neck, back, and underarm areas. The victim’s screams attracted others, and when a physical education teacher forced the door open, Myszkiewicz took advantage of the momentary distraction of witnesses and escaped. A nationwide manhunt was launched the following day. She was eventually sentenced to 25 years in prison and was released several years later. The motive was despair related to Piotr’s father, Jerzy Popławski, with whom she had a 4-year affair. After their relationship ended a few days before the tragedy, Myszkiewicz began contemplating the crime.
May 7, 2001	Anchorage, Alaska, United States	Jason Pritchard, 33		4	33-year-old Jason Pritchard stabbed four young students in the neck at Mountain View Elementary School, Pritchard was later sentenced to 99 years in jail in 2002.
June 8, 2001	Ikeda, Osaka, Japan	Mamoru Takuma, 37	8	15	Ikeda school massacre: Armed with a kitchen knife, a 37-year-old former janitor Mamoru Takuma went into Ikeda Elementary School, attached to Osaka-Kyoiku University, and stabbed school children and teachers, killing 8 children and wounding 13 children and 2 teachers. Takuma was later hung to death on September 14, 2004.
December 19, 2001	Rosario, Santa Fe, Argentina	Esteban Velásquez	1		During the December 2001 Crisis, police officer Esteban Velásquez shot and killed Claudio "Pocho" Lepratti, who was yelling at him from the roof of school number 756 "José M. Serrano" not to shoot because there were children inside.
September 4, 2002	Seoul, South Korea	Hwang Bom-nae, 53		10	10 children were injured at Neung Dong Church Elementary School in Seoul, when Hwang Bom-nae attacked them with kitchen knives. Hwang told police he heard the voice of Kim Il-Sung that commanded him to kill many people or he would be killed.
October 20, 2002	Kampala, Uganda	Edward Mwanje, 20	3	2	Edward Mwanje, a 20-year-old businessman with schizophrenia, murdered two girls in a nursery in Kampala, Uganda using various sharp weapons, and also injured two other children. After the attack, the killer was lynched with stones by an angry mob.
November 26, 2002	Huaiji county, China	Shi Ruoqiu	5	2	Shi Ruoqiu stabbed seven children at Shilong Elementary School with a kitchen knife before being arrested. One child died at the scene, while four more died of their wounds in hospital.
March 7, 2003	Beihai, China	Xie Zhongcai, 24		8	24-year-old Xie Zhongcai stabbed four teachers and four children in a kindergarten in Beihai. He had been rejected by one of the teachers he was in love with, who had then arranged for him to be beaten up. Xie was finally overpowered by staff members and the father of one of the kindergarten children.
June 1, 2004	Sasebo, Nagasaki, Japan	Unidentified girl, 11	1		An 11-year-old student, identified only as "Girl A", killed a 12-year-old classmate, Satomi Mitarai, by slitting her throat at Okubo Elementary School in Sasebo.
September 11, 2004	Suzhou, China	Yang Guozhu, 41		28	A man armed with a knife and homemade explosives attacked 28 children at a kindergarten.
September 20, 2004	Ying County, China	Jia Qingyou, 36		25	36-year-old Jia Qingyou, a bus driver, injured 25 children with a kitchen knife at No. 1 Experimental Primary School in Ying County. He was later sentenced to death and executed on November 24, 2004.
September 30, 2004	Chenzhou, China	Liu Hongwen, 28	4	12	Liu Hongwen, a 28-year-old primary school teacher, killed four children with a knife in a first grade class at a school in Chenzhou, wounding nine other children and three teachers. He took 65 students hostage. After negotiations with a county official, he surrendered to police. He was later found not guilty by reason of insanity due to schizophrenia.
December 3, 2004	Mingcheng Town, China	Liu Zhigang, 30		12	12 students were stabbed by Liu Zhigang, a man suffering from schizophrenia, at the Central Primary School of Mingcheng Town, Panshi City. Liu was found not guilty by reason of insanity.
February 14, 2005	Neyagawa, Japan	..., 17	1	2	A 17-year-old boy stabbed two teachers and a school nutritionist with a kitchen knife at his former elementary school, killing one of the teachers.
March 30, 2005	Ylikylä, Finland	Unknown male		1	A man stabbed his wife at Ylikylä school cafeteria's kitchen. The woman was released from the hospital later that evening.
October 12, 2005	Guangde County, China	Liu Shibing, 33		18	18 people, among them 16 children, were injured when Liu Shibing shot them with six home-made guns at Niutoushan Primary School in Guangde.
December 10, 2005	Uji, Japan	Yu Hagino, 23	1		23-year-old teacher Yu Hagino stabbed 12-year-old Sayano Horimoto to death at a cram school in Uji, following a verbal dispute. Yu was sentenced to 18 years in prison in March 2007.
May 8, 2006	Shiguan, China	Bai Ningyang, 19	12	5	Shiguan kindergarten attack. Armed with two knives and petrol 19-year-old Bai Ningyang entered a classroom of a kindergarten in Shiguan, a village near Gongyi. He forced the 21 children and the teacher to the back of the room, sprayed the floor with gasoline, and, before setting it on fire, let one child go, because he knew their parents. Bai locked the door and escaped. 12 of the children died; four others and the teacher were wounded. Bai was arrested the next day and sentenced to death on December 7, 2007.
May 24, 2006	Luoying, China	Yang Xinlong, 35	2	2	35-year-old farmer Yang Xinlong hacked his aunt to death, set her house on fire and injured another person after an argument; he next went to Luoying Primary School where he stabbed a third-grade child to death and took 18 others hostage for several hours. When Yang refused to let the children go, he was shot and arrested by police.
October 2, 2006	Lancaster County, Pennsylvania, United States	Charles Carl Roberts, 32	6	5	West Nickel Mines School shooting: Charles Carl Roberts, a 32-year-old milk-tank truck driver, took hostages and eventually shot ten girls, killing five (aged 7–13), before killing himself at West Nickel Mines School, a one-room Amish schoolhouse.
December 11, 2006 to December 13, 2006	Yuli, Hualien, Taiwan	Lin Wenzhuang		1	The fifth-grade teacher Lin Wenzhuang (林玟妝) badly beat an Amis boy at Chung Cheng Primary School for three days in a row, to be sentenced to 50 days of imprisonment with administrative sanctions but not removed from the school, and her school would be judicially ordered to pay costly restitutions and post a notice of apology at the school website through June 2011 when the victim would likely graduate from a middle school.
June 13, 2007	Chiling, China	Su Qianxiao, 42	1	3	A nine-year-old boy was killed when Su Qianxiao, a 42-year-old villager, stabbed four children with a kitchen knife at Chiling Primary School. He was caught by locals before he could commit suicide.
August 4, 2007	Newark, New Jersey, United States	José Carranza, 28, and two 15-year-old unidentified boys	3	1	In what is known as the Newark Schoolyard Killings, three Delaware State University students were forced to kneel against an elementary school wall and were shot execution-style by 28-year-old Jose Carranza and two 15-year-old juveniles. A fourth student was found with gunshot wounds to her head.
September 13, 2007	Hengyang, China	Kuang Xi, 28	1	5	28-year-old Kuang Xi, an allegedly mentally disturbed man, hurled five girls and one boy out of a window on the third floor of Hongqiao Primary School, killing a nine-year-old girl. He was subdued by four men, before he could throw out a seventh child.
January 7, 2009	Budapest, Hungary	Unknown	2	1	A principal and a teacher were killed by a security guard and an administrator at a private elementary school in the 21 district of Budapest at 6:40 pm. The guard afterwards shot himself in the hand to support claims the deed was the act of an unknown masked gunman. The perpetrators had been fired by the principal on suspicion of embezzling.
January 23, 2009	Tromsø, Norway		2		A man shot and killed a female trainee teacher and then fatally shot himself in the car park of a kindergarten. The shooting occurred just as children were arriving for school.
January 23, 2009	Sint-Gillis-bij-Dendermonde, Dendermonde, Belgium	Kim De Gelder, 20	4	12	Dendermonde nursery attack: Kim De Gelder entered a kindergarten in Belgium and started stabbing people. Two children and a 54-year-old woman were stabbed to death and twelve other people were injured in the attack. De Gelder also stabbed a 73-year-old woman to death in her apartment days earlier. On March 22, 2013, De Gelder was found guilty and sentenced to life in jail.
March 3, 2009	Mazhan, China	Xu Ximei, 40	2	4	40-year-old Xu Ximei, an allegedly mentally disabled woman, stabbed two boys, aged 4 and 6, to death with a kitchen knife and injured another three children, as well as the 76-year-old grandmother of one of her victims at the primary school of Mazhan village. She was later found lying in a classroom and arrested.
March 23, 2010	Nanping, China	Zheng Minsheng, 41	8	5	Nanping school massacre: Eight children were hacked to death with a machete and five others were injured outside an elementary school in Nanping. The assailant, identified as 41-year-old Zheng Minsheng, was restrained by school security guards and then arrested by police, he was executed on April 28, 2010 by firing squad.
April 13, 2010	Xichang, China	Yang Jiaqin, 40	2	5	An assailant armed with a meat cleaver attacked students and bystanders outside an elementary school, killing a schoolboy and an elderly woman and wounding three other children and two adults before being arrested by police. The assailant, identified as 40-year-old Yang Jiaqin, was reported to be mentally ill.
April 28, 2010	Leizhou, China	Chen Kangbing, 33		17	Chen Kangbing stabbed and injured 16 students and one teacher at Leicheng First Primary School in Leizhou before being restrained by teachers and arrested by police.
April 29, 2010	Taixing, China	Xu Yuyuan, 47		32	Xu Yuyuan stabbed 29 children, two teachers and a security guard at the Zhongxin Kindergarten in Taixing. Five of the injured children were reported in critical condition.
April 30, 2010	Weifang, China	Wang Yonglai, 45	1	6	Wang Yonglai, a 45-year-old farmer, used a motorcycle to break through a gate at Shangzhuang Primary School in Weifang and then attacked several children with a hammer, wounding five of them. A teacher was injured trying to stop Wang. He grabbed two children as hostages and poured gasoline over himself. Teachers pulled the children to safety before Wang set himself on fire, committing suicide.
May 12, 2010	Hanzhong, China	Wu Huanming, 48	10	11	An assailant used a cleaver to kill seven children and two adults and wounded 11 other children at the Shengshui Temple Kindergarten in Hanzhong. Identified as 48-year-old Wu Huanming, the assailant fled from the school and committed suicide at his house.
August 3, 2010	Zibo, China	Fang Jiantang, 26	3	7	A knife-wielding man attacked children and staff at a kindergarten in Zibo. He killed three children and wounded three other children and four teachers in the attack. Two of the teachers were reported in critical condition. Assailant 26-year-old Fang Jiantang was arrested by police.
October 8, 2010	Carlsbad, California, United States	Brendan Liam O’Rourke, 41		2	A middle aged man holding a jack-o-lantern shot at the campus at Kelly Elementary School, his bullets grazing the shoulders of two students, who were ages six and seven, respectively. 41-year-old Brendan Liam O’Rourke was apprehended by police. He was tried and sentenced to life imprisonment.
October 22, 2010	Zamboanga City, Philippines	Felin Mateo, 51	4	6	A 12-year-old girl, a teacher, and a 64-year-old man were stabbed to death by ex-convict Felin Mateo at Talisayan Elementary School in Talisayan village. He also wounded four other children and two teachers, some of them seriously, before he could be subdued by villagers; they killed him with his knife.
February 2, 2011	Placerville, California, United States	John Luebbers, 44	1		Principal Sam Lacara, 50, was fatally shot in his office at Louisiana Schnell Elementary School in Placerville and later died at a hospital. John Luebbers, a 44-year-old school custodian, was arrested after the shooting. Luebbers was sentenced to 50 years in prison.
April 7, 2011	Realengo, Rio de Janeiro, Brazil	Wellington Menezes de Oliveira, 23	13	12	Rio de Janeiro school shooting: A gunman armed with two handguns began shooting at children and school personnel at Escola Municipal Tasso da Silveira, an elementary school. 13 people were killed, including the shooter, a former student. Police shot the suspect in the leg, causing him to fall down a staircase, then the gunman fatally shot himself in the head. The shooter is reported to have left a suicide note.
July 7, 2011	Muar, Johor, Malaysia	Lau Hui Chung, 40	None	None	2011 Muar kindergarten hostage crisis: A machete-wielding drug addict had held hostages of 30 preschool children aged between 2 and 6 years old and four teachers of a kindergarten before shot dead by the police special force in July 2011.
August 29, 2011	Shanghai, China	..., 30		8	A 30-year-old woman slashed eight children with a box cutter at a child-care centre in Shanghai, wounding one seriously. The attacker, a day care worker at the kindergarten, was arrested; she was reported to have suffered from psychiatric problems.
September 14, 2011	Gongyi, China	Wang Hongbin, 30	4	2	A young girl and three adults taking their children to nursery school were killed in Gongyi, Henan with an axe by 30-year-old Wang Hongbin, a local farmer thought to have schizophrenia. Another child and an adult were seriously wounded but survived.
September 26, 2011	Chomutov, Czech Republic	Unknown student, 15		1	15-year-old student attacked a school secretary with a mallet, injuring her. He shouted multiple times that the incident is a terrorist attack.
November 15, 2011	Ga-Mmasehlong, South Africa	Happy Shapo, 40	1		Gilford Shapo, teacher at Mmasehlong Primary School in Ga-Mmasehlong village, was hacked to death with a machete in front of his class by his brother Happy. The attacker was arrested by police.
May 22, 2012	Havířov, Czech Republic	Barbora Orlová		1	Havířov school stabbing: Woman in her 20s stabbed a teacher who was preventing her from taking a randomly chosen 7-year-old child from the classroom. She was released from psychiatric facility in February 2014 and committed another school stabbing 2 years later at high school in October 2014 in Žďár nad Sázavou.
October 29, 2012	Rakovník, Czech Republic	Unknown student, 14		1	14-year-old student stabbed his 61-year-old Math teacher during a break, injuring her severely
December 14, 2012	Chenpeng, China	Min Yongjun, 36	1	18	Chenpeng Village Primary School stabbing: An assailant, identified as 36-year-old Min Yongjun, fatally stabbed an elderly woman and injured 18 children at Chenpeng Village Primary School.
December 14, 2012	Newtown, Connecticut, United States	Adam Lanza, 20	27	2	Sandy Hook Elementary School shooting. 20-year-old Adam Lanza shot and killed his mother at home, then drove to Sandy Hook Elementary School where he shot and killed 20 students and six adult staff members before killing himself. This event is the second-deadliest school shooting in United States history, after the Virginia Tech massacre.
January 7, 2013	Fort Myers, Florida, United States		1		In the parking lot of the Apostolic Revival Center and Christian School, a man was fatally shot in what was believed to be a targeted rather than random killing. No students were present at the time.
January 29, 2013	Midland City, Alabama, United States	Jimmy Lee Dykes	2		2013 Alabama bunker hostage crisis. A man in his 60s boarded a school bus and shot the bus driver, Charles Albert Poland Jr., 66. Poland was killed. The gunman abducted a 6-year-old child and held him hostage in an underground bunker. The gunman, Jimmy Lee Dykes, was shot to death by police several days later.
May 23, 2013	Ylivieska, Finland	6th grade male student		1	6th grade student stabbed a 4th grade student in the armpit with a pocket knife.
August 20, 2013	Decatur, Georgia, United States	Michael Brandon Hill, 20 (suspect)		0	A gunman with an AK-47 fired six shots inside the front office of Ronald E. McNair Discovery Learning Academy, an elementary school. Next the gunman barricaded himself in the office, and police at the scene returned fire. Nobody was injured. The gunman surrendered and was apprehended. Children were evacuated from the building so parents could pick them up. The alleged gunman is a 20-year-old male named Michael Brandon Hill.
September 9, 2013	Guilin, China	Unknown	2	44	Two adults were killed outside Balijie Primary School, and 44 others were injured after a homemade explosive detonated. Most of the injured were schoolchildren. One of those killed is the bomber, who was riding his motorcycle during the explosion.
October 4, 2013	Spencer, Massachusetts, United States	7-year-old student		1	A 7-year-old student was stabbed by another 7-year-old student at Wire Village School. The victim was hospitalized for serious but non-life-threatening injuries.
October 17, 2013	Jacksonville, Arkansas, United States	Nicholas John Miller, 22 (suspect)			A man with a knife hijacked a school bus in Jacksonville, taking 11 Pinewood Elementary School students and their bus driver on a detour; police ended it in Cabot after a 10-mile chase and 20 minutes after it began. The suspect, 22-year-old Nicholas John Miller, was charged with a felony count of vehicle piracy, 12 felony counts of kidnapping, and two felony counts of aggravated assault.
May 21, 2014	Macheng, Hubei, China	..., 35		8	A man armed with a meat-cleaver slashed eight children on a playground. Eight students were injured; one was seriously injured and seven others sustained minor injuries. A 35-year-old man was arrested.
May 30, 2014	Oakland, California, United States	Hasseemah Diemi, 39 (charged)		1	A 9-year-old girl was attacked with a hammer at Lafayette Elementary School. The girl was hospitalized. A 39-year-old woman, who was a class volunteer at the school, was arrested at the scene and charged with assault with a deadly weapon.
September 1, 2014	Shiyan, Hubei province, China	Yanfu Chen, 43	4	5	Chen stabbed three children and a teacher to death at a primary school, and wounded 5 others. Chen then committed suicide by jumping off the building.
September 26, 2014	Guilin, Guangxi province, China	Suspect, 56	4		Four children were stabbed to death as they were walking to their school. A 56-year-old suspect is wanted.
April 6, 2015	Brasília, Brazil	Marivaldo Teixeira da Silva, 33		18	33-year-old Marivaldo Teixeira da Silva gained access to the Centro de Ensino Fundamental 1 school after he beaten the watchmen with a chair, after entering the facility he began hitting the children and the teachers with the same weapon. After students threw rocks at him, he was subdued and arrested. Two teachers and 14 children were injured in the attack, while other 25 were injured on the panic. Early before the attack he attempted to enter a house and stabbed the owner.
March 30, 2015	University City, Missouri, United States			1	Police said one person was arrested for a shooting at Pershing Elementary School in University City. The shooting occurred in the parking lot, and a 34-year-old-man was shot in the buttocks.
March 18, 2016	Los Angeles, California, U.S.	11-year-old student		1	A student at Bridge Street Elementary School was stabbed by a fellow fifth-grade student. The suspect, 11, was booked into a juvenile hall and charged with attempted murder and knife possession.
November 25, 2016	Hanzhong, China	Lei Mingyue, 58		9	Around 11:40 a.m. 58-year-old Lei Mingyue entered an after-school care center in Hantai District and attacked students lining up for lunch with an axe. After wounding seven female students from Beiguan Primary School he fled the premises, injuring two passersby during his escape. He was later arrested by police and stated he carried out the attack as revenge on society after he was arrested twice for theft.
December 13, 2016	Savu, Indonesia	Unknown, 32		7	A 32-year-old man stabbed seven children, aged between eight and eleven years, with a knife at a primary school on Savu, an island in East Nusa Tenggara province. The man afterwards tried to flee, but was arrested by police and eventually lynched by a mob of several hundred people in his jail cell.
April 10, 2017	San Bernardino, California	Cedric Anderson, 53	3	1	2017 North Park Elementary School shooting: A man shot and killed his wife and a student and injured another student before killing himself.
November 14, 2017	Rancho Tehama, California	Kevin Janson Neal, 44	6	12	Rancho Tehama shootings: 44-year-old Kevin Janson Neal fired gunshots at several locations throughout Rancho Tehama, California, including Rancho Tehama Elementary School, a school within the Corning Union Elementary School District. Though five people were killed and twelve others were wounded, no deaths occurred at the school itself, with only two students suffering non-fatal gunshot wounds. Neal was later shot and killed by sheriff's deputies.
January 15, 2018	Perm, Russia	2 attackers, 16		12	2018 Perm school stabbing: Two masked teenagers armed with knives stormed a school in Perm, wounding at least 12 people, most of them elementary school students. Two suspects, both 16, were detained by police and the incident is being treated as attempted murder.
April 16, 2018	Sauk Rapids, Minnesota, U.S.	Student, 8		3	Three students at Pleasantview Elementary School were cut with a kitchen knife and received “superficial wounds.” The suspect was an 8-year-old boy, and the attack's motive was not released.
October 26, 2018	Chongqing City, China	Unknown women		~14	A woman wielding a kitchen knife attacked at least 14 children at a kindergarten in Chongqing. Chongqing City Banan District police said the children were slashed as they walked back to class after their morning exercises at Yudong New Century Kindergarten about 9.30 a.m. local time.
January 8, 2019	Beijing, China	Jia		20	2019 Beijing school attack: A maintenance worker attacked pupils in a primary school with a hammer and injured 20 people
March 14, 2019	Fengrun District, Tangshan City, Hebei Province, China	Cui Zhenjiang		17	On the afternoon of March 14, 2019, a man attacked students near the Guanghuadao Primary School and 17 students were injured.
May 3, 2019	Thanh Hoa, Vietnam	Do Manh Chieu Minh	1	4	An 11-year-old fifth grade student were stabbed to death, Do Manh Wounded 3 student and 1 teacher who were rushed to save the fifth grade during the break time.
May 10, 2019	Warsaw, Poland	Emil Barański, 15	1		15-year-old Emil Barański murdered 16-year-old Kuba Kiziltas at Primary School No. 195. The motive was the victim’s failure to pay for drugs.
May 27, 2019	Brześć Kujawski, Poland	Marek Nowak, 18		2	18-year-old Marek Nowak, a former student of Primary School No. 1 named after Władysław Łokietek, arrived at the school by bicycle and entered the building unnoticed. He went to the second floor, where he threw a homemade firecracker into the school during an evacuation. During the incident, 11-year-old Oliwia Gorzycka was shot three times in the back and abdomen and was later also struck in the head by a firecracker. When a 59-year-old female school caretaker attempted to check what was happening, she was immediately shot three times, with one bullet hitting her in the abdomen. The attacker was then subdued by school caretaker Krzysztof Gorzycki, and Marek Nowak was ultimately arrested by the police.The motive was fascination with school shooters.
May 28, 2019	Kawasaki City, Kanagawa Prefecture, Japan	Ryuichi Iwasaki, 51	2	17	Kawasaki stabbings: Nineteen people, including sixteen children, were stabbed at the school bus stop.
September 2, 2019	Chaoyangpo, Enshi City, Hubei, China	Yu Hua, 40	8	2	A man reportedly armed with a meat cleaver killed eight young children at a school.
November 12, 2019	Kaiyuan, Yunnan, China	Wong, 23	0	54	A 23-year-old man surnamed Kong, seeking revenge against society committed a chemical attack by throwing caustic soda on students and teachers.
January 10, 2020	Torreón, Coahuila, Mexico	José Ángel Ramos Betts, 11	1	6	Colegio Cervantes shooting: An 11-year-old student opened fire, killing a teacher and injuring 6 others before shooting himself.
June 11, 2020	Vrútky, Slovakia	Ivan Čulok, 22	1	7	2020 Vrútky school stabbing: A man stabbed six people, killing one, before being shot dead by police.
May 4, 2021	Saudades, Santa Catarina, Brazil	Fabiano Kipper Mai, 18	5	2	Saudades massacre: A former student slashed people at a kindergarten, killing five and wounding two.
September 27, 2021	Pasco, Washington, United States	Joshua D. Davis, 34	1	0	A school bus driver, Richard Lenhart, was fatally stabbed in front of a busload of students.
April 26, 2022	Veshkayma, Ulyanovsk Oblast, Russia	Ruslan Akhtyamov, 26	3	1	2022 Veshkayma kindergarten shooting: A man shot four people with a shotgun in the kindergarten, killing three before committing suicide. Shortly before that he killed owner of the gun.
May 24, 2022	Uvalde, Texas, United States	Salvador Ramos, 18	21	21	Uvalde School shooting: A former student killed 21 people and wounded 18 others with an AR-15 rifle before being killed by police.
September 26, 2022	Izhevsk, Russia	Artyom Kazanstev, 34	18	23	Izhevsk school shooting: A man returned to his former school with two pistols and killed eighteen people before killing himself.
October 6, 2022	Na Klang, Thailand	Panya Khamrab, 34	36	10	2022 Nong Bua Lamphu massacre: A man killed 36 people and injured 10 others in a series of shootings, stabbings, and vehicle-ramming attacks. 22 of the dead were students.
November 25, 2022	Aracruz, Brazil		4	12	Aracruz school shootings: A 16-year-old opened fire at two schools, shooting sixteen people, four fatally.
January 6, 2023	Newport News, Virginia, US	6-year-old student	0	1	Shooting of Abby Zwerner: A student shot and injured a teacher.
March 27, 2023	Nashville, Tennessee, United States	Aiden Hale, 28	6	2	2023 Covenant School shooting: A man with a rifle shot six people to death at his former school before being killed by police.
April 5, 2023	Blumenau, Brazil		4	5	Blumenau school attack. A 25-year-old man killed four children and wounded five others with an ax at Cantinho Bom Pastor school in Blumenau, Brazil.
May 3, 2023	Belgrade, Serbia	13-year-old male student	10	6	Belgrade school shooting: A 13-year-old student shot and killed ten people and wounded six others at school.
May 3, 2023	Berlin, Germany	39-year-old male		2	On May 3, 2023, a 39-year-old male wounded two young children, aged 7 and 8, with a knife in the schoolyard at the Protestant School in Neukoelln district, Berlin, Germany.
June 14, 2023	Lukavac, Tuzla Canton, Bosnia	Unidentified		1	A former student shot and wounded a teacher in the Lukavac Elementary School.
July 10, 2023	Lianjiang, Guandong, China	Wu Moujie, 25	6	1	2023 Lianjiang stabbing: At approximately 07:40 local time, a subject identified as Wu Moujie, 25 years old, fatally stabbed three children, two parents and a teacher after an argument with an anonymous person who was injured in the midst of the tragedy.
November 22, 2023	Khon San district, Thailand	Unnamed man	0	1	A mentally ill man armed with a knife stabbed a teacher at Ban Namphu Hinlard School before being arrested.
November 23, 2023	Dublin, Ireland	Riad Bouchaker, 49		4	2023 Dublin stabbings: A man stabbed three children and wounded a teacher before being subdued and wounded.
May 20, 2024	Guixi, China	45-year-old woman	2	10	A woman wielding a fruit knife killed two people and injured ten. The perpetrator is under invastigation.
September 17, 2024	Azambuja, Portugal	12-year-old boy		6	2024 Azambuja school stabbing
December 20, 2024	Zagreb, Croatia	19-year-old man	1	6	Zagreb school stabbing: A 19-year-old male fatally stabbed one child and wounded six others.
May 21, 2025	Renko, Finland	Unnamed student		1	A student under the age of twelve stabbed another student at Renko school.
January 22, 2026	Ntabankulu, South Africa	Ntuthuzelo Gcaba	3		Ntabankulu Primary School shooting, occurred at the Ntabankulu Primary School in Ntabankulu, Eastern Cape, South Africa, three teachers were killed. The perpetrator killed himself.
April 29, 2026	Moscow, Russia	Fourth-grader		1	A fourth-grade student at School No. 1474 injured a teacher with a kitchen knife.
September 22, 2026	Ptaki, Poland	11 year-old		1	An 11 year-old boy randomly attacked a 10 year-old girl with a hatchet at a primary school in the village of Ptaki, Poland. The boy was subdued by a parent and the girl was taken to hospital .
September 29, 2026	Staškov, Slovakia	13 year-old	1	2	A 13 year-old boy stabbed two adults and another child at a primary school in northwestern Slovakia. One of the adults, a 61 year old woman passed away from the injuries she sustained.
October 8, 2026	Leszczydół-Nowiny, Poland	15 year-old	1	2	A 15-year-old former student attacked staff at a primary school in Leszczydół-Nowiny with knives, killing one person and injuring two others.
October 15, 2026	Bend, Oregon, USA	Griffin J. John II	5	2	A 16 year-old former student injured 2 and killed 4 individuals associated with the Silver Rail Elementary School in Bend, Oregon before being killed himself by a parent who happened to be armed.

== See also ==
- School bullying
- School shooting
- School violence
- List of school-related attacks
- List of attacks related to secondary schools
- List of attacks related to post-secondary schools
- List of rampage killers: School massacres
