= Doeur Seoung =

Cambodian-American serial killer (born 1970)

- Born: 1970 (age 55–56); Cambodia
- Conviction: Murder x4
- Penalty: Texas: 2 years imprisonment (Yem); Life sentence (Long); California: Life sentence without possible parole

Details
- Victims: 4
- Span of crimes: 1985–1998
- Country: United States
- States: Texas, California
- Date apprehended: For the final time in 1998

Doeur Seoung (Khmer: សឿង ឌឿ; born 1970) is a Cambodian-American serial killer and rapist who committed four murders in Texas and California from 1985 to 1998, two of which were done while he was still a teenager. He was given life terms for his respective crimes in both states.

== Early life ==
Doeur Seoung was born in a rural region of Cambodia in 1970, the son of Sok Seoung (Khmer: សឿង សុខ) and an unknown mother. He and his father moved to the United States as refugees around 1983, settling in Austin, Texas, where Seoung attended the Lamar Junior High School. He was reportedly an unruly and ill-disciplined child who was repeatedly arrested for burglary and theft, and by the time he committed his first known crimes, he rarely went to McCallum High School.

== Murders ==
=== Volith Long ===
On March 13, 1985, the naked body of 6-year-old Volith Long was found in a dumpster behind an apartment building in North Austin, stuffed inside a plastic trash bag and wrapped up in a curtain. She was wearing only a shirt, had been sexually assaulted, and then strangled to death. She was last seen only hours prior by a neighbor, and due to the fact that she was withdrawn and lived in an area populated mostly by refugees who spoke little English, authorities believed that Long was killed by somebody known to her.

The murder came as a shock to the community and especially her mother, Rady, who had spent the last few years in various refugee camps around Southeast Asia fleeing persecution from the Khmer Rouge, who had killed Long's father in 1978. As investigators struggled to gather useful clues or identify any viable suspects, they requested that the public submit anonymous tips via the local Crime Stoppers. As this failed to generate any leads, investigators focused on examining some of the items found at the crime scene in an attempt to gather fingerprint evidence, but this provided no results.

=== Sath Yem ===
On September 5, the body of 67-year-old Sath Yem was found inside her apartment in North Austin, located only half a mile away from where Long had been killed months prior. On that day, Yem's son went to visit her, but after she failed to answer the door, he contacted the apartment complex's manager to help him open the door. When she failed to open it with the master key, they got one of the neighbors' children to go through an open window and open the door from the inside. To their shock, Yem's body was found inside, with both of her grandchildren seemingly unharmed. An autopsy determined that she had been sexually assaulted and strangled, with authorities assuming that this was done by a home invader since some items and money had been stolen from the apartment.

Later that day, one of the children present in the apartment told family members that the intruder was none other than Seoung, who had repeatedly burglarized their home and bragged about it to one of Yem's sons. When the son scolded him for his behavior, Seoung responded by slashing one of his car's tires. After his arrest, it was determined that he had brandished a handgun and a ski mask during the burglaries, and later led the police to where he had stashed jewelry stolen from Yem's purse, which amounted to $3,000. Another $5,000 stolen from the apartment were never recovered, but police believed that Seoung had bought a motorcycle with the money, which was impounded after his arrest.

=== Trial, release, and relapse ===
Due to the severity of his crime, prosecutors pushed for Seoung to be tried as an adult - under Texas law, this meant that he faced a possible life sentence. To the dismay of family members and the prosecutors, however, Justice Joe Hart ruled that he should be tried as a juvenile, which meant that the maximum possible sentence would be two years in a correctional institution. Subsequently, he was convicted on all counts and given that exact sentence.

== Relapse and aftermath ==
After serving out his sentence, Seoung was released from prison. A large portion of his life in the following years remains a mystery, but in 1998, he was convicted of a double murder in the state of California, where he was sentenced to life imprisonment without parole. As a convicted felon, he was ordered to give a DNA sample to law enforcement, in case he could be linked to any additional crimes.

Approximately three years after this conviction, a retired schoolteacher who used to teach in one of Seoung's classes saw an episode of CrimeStoppers covering the still-unsolved murder of Volith Long. Upon seeing it, he submitted a tip to them, suggesting that Seoung might have been responsible. After further inspection, his DNA was matched with evidence left at the crime scene, positively tying him to the crime. An arrest warrant was issued for him and extradition proceedings were commenced not long after. In late June 2001, he was extradited to stand trial in Texas, with his bail set at $500,000.

At his murder trial, which took place in February 2002, Seoung pleaded guilty to the crime. As a result, he was sentenced to life imprisonment with the possibility of parole after 20 years. According to his lawyer, if he had not accepted the plea bargain, Seoung would have likely been given another life term without parole, effectively confining him behind bars for the rest of his life. Since then, no further information has been published on his status, where he is incarcerated, or whether he is still alive.

== See also ==
- List of serial killers in the United States
- List of youngest killers
