= Curtis Jones =

Curtis Jones may refer to:

- Curtis Jones (pianist) (1906–1971), American blues pianist
- Curtis Jones or Green Velvet (born 1968), American singer, record producer, and DJ
- Curtis Jones (murderer) (born 1986), American minister convicted of murder as a minor
- Curtis Jones (basketball), American basketball player
- Curtis Jones (footballer, born 1993), English footballer
- Curtis Jones (footballer, born 2001), English footballer
- Curtis J. Jones Jr., American politician

== See also ==
- Curt Jones (disambiguation)
