= Michigan school shooting =

Michigan school shooting may refer to:

- Killing of Kayla Rolland, Buell Elementary School, Buell Mount Morris Township, Michigan, February 29, 2000
- Oxford High School shooting, Oxford Township, Michigan, November 30, 2021
- Michigan State University shooting, East Lansing, Michigan, February 13, 2023

== See also ==
- Bath School disaster, a school bombing at Bath Consolidated School in Bath Charter Township, Michigan, May 18, 1927
- List of mass shootings in the United States
