= Amanda Tipples =

British judge (born 1966)

The Honourable Mrs Justice Tipples
- Royal coat of arms of the United Kingdom

High Court Judge King's Bench Division
- Incumbent
- Assumed office 2 December 2019
- Monarchs: Elizabeth II; Charles III

Personal details
- Born: 18 December 1966 (age 59) Pembury, England
- Education: Gonville and Caius College, Cambridge

Dame Amanda Jane Tipples, DBE, KC (born 18 December 1966) is a British High Court judge assigned to the King's Bench Division.

== Early life and education ==
Tipples was born in Pembury, England and was educated at Roedean School. She then attended Gonville and Caius College, Cambridge, where she studied zoology and specialised in molecular biology, graduating with a Bachelor of Arts (BA) degree in 1989. She completed her legal education at the Council of Legal Education.

== Legal career ==
She was called to the bar at Gray's Inn in 1991 and practised from Maitland Chambers. She served as a recorder from 2009 and took silk to become a Queen's Counsel (QC) in 2011. In 2013, she was appointed a deputy High Court judge, hearing cases in the Chancery Division, and served as Lieutenant Bailiff of Guernsey from 2016 to 2019.

On 2 December 2019, Tipples was appointed a justice of the High Court, replacing Sir Paul Walker, and assigned to the Queen's Bench Division (later the King's Bench Division). She received the customary damehood in the same year. Since 2022, she has been Presiding Judge of the Midland Circuit.

Notable cases in which she presided over as judge include the Murder of Shawn Seesahai.
