= Murder of Craig Sorger =

Murder of an autistic teenager in 2003

- Location: Ephrata, Washington, U.S.
- Date: February 15, 2003; 23 years ago
- Attack type: Murder by beating and stabbing
- Weapons: A rock, knife and a tree branch
- Victim: Craig Martin Sorger
- Perpetrators: Evan Drake Savoie; Jake Lee Eakin
- Motive: Thrill
- Verdict: Guilty
- Convictions: Savoie: First-degree murder (first trial); Second-degree murder (second and final trial); Eakin: Second-degree murder
- Judge: John Antosz (2003); Kenneth L. Jorgensen (2005, 2006); John Hotchkiss (2011)

Craig Martin Sorger (February 10, 1990 – February 15, 2003) was a developmentally disabled 13-year-old American boy who was murdered by his 12-year-old friends Evan Drake Savoie and Jake Lee Eakin in Ephrata, Washington on February 15, 2003.

During a court hearing, Savoie and Eakin were charged with first and second-degree murder respectively and were tried as adults. As part of a plea bargain, Eakin eventually confessed to murdering Sorger and agreed to testify against Savoie. Eakin was sentenced to 14 years in prison and later appealed his conviction unsuccessfully. Savoie was initially sentenced to 26 years in prison, which was reduced to 20 years after an appeal. Savoie eventually also confessed to murdering Sorger at his second trial.

== Background ==
Craig Sorger was born on Everett on February 10, 1990. His parents were Chuck and Lisa Sorger and he had a younger brother by 1 year named Keith. He had moved to Ephrata when he was 11 years old.

At the time of his murder, he was a seventh grade student from Ephrata Middle School with autism and attention deficit hyperactivity disorder, and had switched to mainstream education after attending special education during his time in elementary school. He struggled socially, which had made him a target for bullies in his childhood. He was also physically delayed and had the maturity level of a 8-year-old child. He also competed at Special Olympics.

== Perpetrators ==
Evan Savoie was born in Ephrata on October 22, 1990, (Note: Evan's mother made a Facebook post in 2022 wishing him a happy birthday on October 22.) and Jake Eakin was born in Moses Lake on November 14, 1990. (Note: In one of his Facebook accounts, he lists his birth date as November 14, 1990.) They met each other when they were 2 years old and were in sixth grade. They had no criminal history prior to the murder.

Eakin was raised by his mother, Tammy Vickery, and his stepfather, Christopher Vickery. He grew up with one brother, Jonathan, and two stepbrothers, Austin and Christopher Vickery. Savoie was raised by his mother, Holly Parent, and his stepfather, Andy Parent Sr. He grew up with one sister, Britanny, and one stepbrother, Andy Parent Jr.

Savoie went to the same school as Sorger and Eakin went to Moses Lake Middle School, where he was a special education student. Eakin met Sorger in middle school when Savoie introduced Sorger to Eakin, and they had played several times before. Savoie and Eakin liked to watch NASCAR races and fishing for perch and crappie together with their stepfathers. Savoie was a popular student at school and the class clown, but was known for bullying younger or unpopular kids. He also worked as a delivery boy for the local newspaper, gaining $12.50 a week. Other kids often bullied Eakin because of his speech disability. He also supposedly has a learning disability, though he denied it. Eakin also had poor grades, occasionally got into trouble at school and had the language abilities of a first or second grader.

== Murder ==
On the afternoon of February 15, 2003, five days after Sorger's 13th birthday, Savoie and Eakin were hanging out at Oasis Park, until Savoie showed a knife to Eakin and said that he "wanted to go on a killing spree", which Eakin didn't believe.

At one point, they stopped by the Sorger residence while Craig and his brother Keith were watching TV and asked Craig's mother, Lisa Sorger, who did not know them, if Craig could play. Lisa allowed Craig to go with the two boys, but told them Craig could not play for long because he was afraid of the dark.

After that, Eakin, Savoie and Sorger went to the park. After playing for a while, Savoie asked Sorger to feel the ground to see if it was wet. He instructed Sorger to touch the ground and count to ten. While Sorger was on his knees, Savoie grabbed a rock described by Eakin as "the size of a basketball" and dropped it on Sorger's neck. Savoie then began to repeatedly stab Sorger in his head, neck, chest and torso with a knife. According to Eakin's later testimony, Sorger was trying to run away while screaming "why are you doing this to me?", but Savoie managed to get him back to the ground and continue striking him. Sorger had also supposedly said that he was dying. Eakin testified that he tried to stop Savoie, but he pushed him. Eakin later hit Sorger with a tree branch in the head and legs after initially trying to attack Savoie with it until it broke. With Sorger lying motionless on the ground, Savoie shook Eakin's hand and threw his bloody sweatshirt, that he had gotten for his birthday, and knife at a pond and him and Eakin went to Savoie's home. According to Eakin, the attack lasted a couple of minutes.

As night fell, Lisa got worried as her son was afraid of the dark and hadn't come home yet. So she searched for him to no avail. She visited Savoie's residence and discovered Savoie and Eakin there playing video games together, but Craig was not present. She then called 911 and went to search the park, where she was joined by Keith, Savoie, his parents Holly and Andy Parent, and members of the Ephrata Police Department. A police officer, Joe Downey, soon discovered Sorger's body in a pile of leaves near a trail, along with the rock and tree branch used in the attack nearby. Upon finding her son's body, Lisa pointed at Savoie and accused him of murdering Craig.

When police questioned Savoie and Eakin that night, they claimed they climbed trees and played tag until around 4:30 pm, when they saw Sorger head home. In the next day, Holly discovered that the shoes her son had wore in the park were wet, and she confronted him. Evan changed his story and told her that he and Jake saw Craig fall from a tree, where Evan yelled for Craig to wake up and went to check his pulse, making movements he described as "robotic", and after finding no pulse, Evan panicked and left the park.

Police found no evidence that Sorger fell from a tree. The coroner also pointed out stab wounds on the body which were later determined to come from a knife. Sorger's autopsy revealed that in addition to being beaten several times, he was stabbed five times in the chest and torso and at least 34 times in the head and neck. He also had at least 20 blunt force injuries and the tip of a knife was embedded in Sorger's skull.

Savoie and Eakin were arrested on February 18, 2003 (Note: Jake has stated in one of his Facebook posts that he and Evan were arrested for Craig's murder 3 days after they did it.) and were held in Grant County Youth Services Detention Center. Authorities found a note written by Savoie in which he planned to kill someone else after Sorger. Authorities also found a journal named "Sniper" written by Eakin, in which he idolized and supported the D.C. sniper attacks. The knife used in the attack was found one year later.

== Trials ==
Although Savoie and Eakin both claimed innocence, they were charged with first and second-degree murder respectively and tried as adults by Grant County Superior Court Judge John Antosz. On March 2004, Eakin changed his story and claimed he went to buy a soda, and came back seeing Savoie stabbing Sorger and then threw something at a pond and promised Eakin to give him music CDs if he didn't tell anyone.

In February 2005, The Washington Supreme Court upheld the decision to try the boys as adults by declining to hear the case. At twelve-years-old they became the youngest murder defendants tried as adults in Washington since 1931, and the youngest overall.

Eakin finally confessed to his role in the killing on April 28, 2005 after spending two years in jail. He pleaded guilty to second-degree murder by complicity and agreed to testify against Savoie. Prosecutors agreed to request a relatively light sentence of eight years in prison in exchange for the guilty plea. Eakin was convicted of second-degree murder and sentenced to over 14 years in prison. Grant County Superior Court Judge Kenneth L. Jorgensen ruled that there were no mitigating factors to allow for a sentence of eight years. Several members of Eakin's family, including Christopher and Tammy, cried and gasped as the verdict was read.

On April 3, 2006, Evan Savoie's murder trial began with jury selection, and opening arguments started on April 10.

On April 14, Jake Eakin testified as a witness against Savoie by describing the murder's details.

On April 29, 2006, Savoie was convicted of first-degree murder. On July 8, 2006, he was sentenced to over 26 years in prison, the maximum sentence for a first-time offender. His lawyer stated that the "likelihood that his rehabilitation would be more effective after 26 years than 20 was ridiculous". Grant County Superior Court Judge Kenneth L. Jorgensen, however, disagreed, ruling that Savoie's punishment must match his crime. Holly later complained about the trial's verdict, claiming that her son was "innocent" and that "the killer is still out there". She also called the judge "biased". In 2007, Eakin appealed his sentence unsuccessfully.

=== Savoie's retrial ===
In 2011, Savoie's conviction was overturned on appeal based on the judge's closure of parts of the trial to the public and his appointment of a lawyer for the victim's family who intervened in the trial. Despite initially pleading not guilty in 2011, Savoie later pleaded guilty to second-degree murder in 2013, and finally confessed to murdering Sorger after ten years.

On March 25, 2014, he was sentenced to 20 years in prison by Superior Court Judge John Hotchkiss.

== Aftermath ==
Eakin and Savoie were incarcerated at Green Hill Training School until their 18th birthdays, when they were sent to separate adult prisons.

On June 12, 2016, Eakin escaped from work release while serving the final months of his sentence at Ahtanum View Work Release Center. He was recaptured by U.S. Marshals without incident two days later in Rapid City, South Dakota and was returned to custody.

Eakin remained incarcerated at Washington Corrections Center for the rest of his sentence. Eakin was conditionally released on February 10, 2017. He married his childhood friend, Marissa and had two daughters with her: Elizabeth (born April 9, 2018) and Evangeline (born September 17, 2019). His full sentence ended in April 2019. He is now an anti-LGBTQ and anti-abortion activist. He has also apologized to Sorger in an interview, and said he dedicated his activism to him. He was arrested twice after his release: in 2018 for trespassing and in 2022 for larceny. (Note: A now deleted page of Jake on GreenvilleCounty.org revealed that he was arrested on May 12, 2022 for larceny.)

Savoie was incarcerated in the Airway Heights Corrections Center. He was conditionally released in June 2020. His full sentence ended in April 2026.

== See also ==
- Lionel Tate
- List of youngest killers
- Trial as an adult
