= Shooting of Abby Zwerner =

2023 school shooting in Virginia, US

Coordinates: 37°9′23″N 76°31′25″W

- Location: Richneck Elementary School, Newport News, Virginia, U.S.
- Date: January 6, 2023 c. 2:00 p.m. (EST; UTC−05:00)
- Attack type: School shooting
- Weapon: 9mm Taurus Armas G2A pistol
- Victim: Abby Zwerner (survived)
- Perpetrator: Six-year-old unnamed male student
- Motive: Unknown
- Verdict: Pleaded guilty
- Convictions: Federal: Illegally obtaining and possessing a firearm, making false statements State: Felony child neglect
- Sentence: 3 3/4 years in prison (Note: 1 3/4 years in prison for federal convictions and 2 years in prison for state conviction, to be served consecutively.)
- Convicted: Deja Nicole Taylor (six-year-old male's mother)

On January 6, 2023, Abby Zwerner, an American schoolteacher, was seriously injured when a six-year-old student shot her while she was teaching at Richneck Elementary School in Newport News, Virginia, United States. The boy had brought a 9 mm semi-automatic pistol belonging to his mother from his home, which he hid in his backpack.

The mother of the six-year-old boy was convicted of criminal possession of a weapon, making false statements, and child neglect in relation to the shooting and was sentenced to 3 3/4 years in prison. She has publicly stated that she takes responsibility for the shooting.

A jury awarded Zwerner $10 million following a civil trial against Ebony Parker, an assistant principal at the school, which concluded in November 2025.

== Background ==
The shooting was the first U.S. school shooting of 2023, but the third incident of gun violence in Newport News Public School district in seventeen months. The shooting was one of sixteen U.S. school shootings perpetrated by shooters under the age of ten years since 1970. Richneck Elementary School is an elementary school in Newport News with 550 students. The school was equipped with metal detectors at the time of the shooting, which were randomly used to screen students.

Reports about the student's previous conduct included behavioral issues at school: cursing at staff, trying to whip students with his belt, and choking a teacher. In 2021, the student allegedly came from behind his teacher, locked his forearms around her neck, and pulled her backward; he was subsequently moved to a different school. In the week before the shooting, the student reportedly slammed Zwerner's cell phone and broke it, resulting in a one-day suspension, with his first day back being the day of the shooting.

Before the shooting, multiple staff members, including Zwerner, told school administrators about the student's conduct and concerns that he may have a weapon on him. Zwerner first alerted school officials between 11:15 and 11:30 am, stating that the student had threatened to beat up another student. A second teacher went to a school administrator at 12:30 pm, saying the teacher had taken it upon herself to search the student's backpack. A third teacher told administrators shortly before 1:00 pm that the student had shown another student at recess he had a gun and threatened the child that he would shoot them if they reported it. Reportedly the teacher was told to "wait out the situation" as "the school day was almost over," while another school employee was denied permission to search the student and his belongings. About an hour before she was shot, Zwerner also reportedly texted an unidentified individual that the student claimed to have a gun and that administrators were not helping.

== Shooting ==
During a routine lesson, at approximately 2 p.m. local time on January 6, 2023, the student pointed a 9mm Taurus pistol at Zwerner and then shot at her when she tried to reach out for the weapon. The bullet first passed through her hand and then lodged in her chest. Police reported that the shooting was intentional, and that there was no struggle or warning given before the student discharged the gun. The child's mother Deja Taylor owned the gun that the student brought to the school in his backpack.

Immediately after being shot, Zwerner escorted all of her students out of the classroom and away from the shooter while Amy Kovac, a reading specialist at the school, called 911 and restrained the shooter until police took him into juvenile detention.

Zwerner later told reporters that she remembers the student pointing the gun at her, the look on his face and the gun going off. She had registered that the room was no longer safe for her students and escorted them out. She recounted that she remembers getting to the office and struggling to breathe before passing out.

== Victim ==
Abigail Zwerner, a 25-year-old first grade school teacher, was employed at Richneck Elementary School. Zwerner's injuries were described as life-threatening, she remained critical for two days, and was described as "stable" on January 8, 2023, then released from the hospital mid-January 2023. In a later interview in March 2023, Zwerner stated that the bullet went through her left hand, rupturing multiple bones, before striking her in the chest. At the time of her civil suit in October 2025, Zwerner testified that the bullet was still lodged in her chest.

== Aftermath ==
Richneck Elementary School remained closed during the subsequent week. The school announced that the principal, Briana Foster Newton, had left the position shortly before the school re-opened on January 30. Additionally, school assistant principal Ebony Parker resigned before the school re-opened, and the school district superintendent George Parker III was voted out effective February 1. The school re-opened with additional safety measures in the form of two permanent school division security officers, two metal detectors, doors installed in previously open areas, and all students receiving clear backpacks.

Zwerner later resigned on June 13, 2023. As of January 2025, Zwerner was reportedly still struggling with PTSD, increased anxiety and depression in the aftermath of the shooting.

== Perpetrator ==
The child shooter was arrested and was placed in an unidentified healthcare facility. Due to his age, his identity has not been revealed. On January 13, police stated they did not know about the tip-off that the shooter was armed before the shooting.

The shooting sparked conversations about the legal culpability of very young children and comparisons to the February 29, 2000 killing of Kayla Rolland when a six-year-old boy fatally shot Rolland at Buell Elementary School in Mount Morris Township, Michigan. The boy was not charged with murder due to his age.

In an NBC News opinion piece, a clinical psychologist emphasized the limitations of children's moral development and cognition of events, and called for compassion to be extended to the shooter and for the provision of care and rehabilitation, as opposed to incarceration.

== Legal proceedings ==
On January 25, Zwerner's attorney, Diane Toscano, stated that they intended to file a lawsuit regarding multiple failures by the administration to respond to concerns that the student had a gun on the school campus. Zwerner subsequently started litigation against the Newport News School Board and three former school district officials, seeking damages of $40 million.

In April 2023, lawyers for the school district filed a motion to dismiss Zwerner's lawsuit, which included claims that her injuries fell under the Virginian Worker's Compensation Act which allowed her to receive benefits but that she had rejected them in favor of the lawsuit. A spokesperson for Newport News Public Schools said that Zwerner had resigned from her position in March, and as a result her contract had expired on June 12 and was no longer employed by the district. The motion for dismissal was unsuccessful.

By April 2025, the Newport News School Board and two of the three former school district officials had been removed from the lawsuit, leaving only Ebony Parker as a defendant in the trial, owing to sovereign immunity. Zwerner's civil suit began on October 28, 2025.

In April 2023, the shooter's mother, Deja Nicole Taylor, was indicted on one state felony charge for child neglect, and one misdemeanor charge of allowing access to firearms by children, for which she faced up to six years incarceration.

In June 2023, federal prosecutors from the US Attorney's office for the Eastern District of Virginia charged Taylor in federal court with making a false statement while buying a gun and unlawful usage of Schedule I drug (marijuana) while in possession of a handgun. Taylor's lawyer said that Taylor would plead guilty and that the charges were part of an agreed procedure which eliminated the need for the government to take the case to a grand jury. On June 5, Taylor pleaded guilty to the federal charges of illegally obtaining and possessing a firearm, and making a false statement during the purchase of a firearm. As part of the plea agreement, federal prosecutors asked the court for a sentence of 18 months to 24 months in prison instead of the maximum 25 years in prison. Taylor was released on bond pending sentencing on the condition that she refrain from unlawful drug use and possession. Her sentencing was scheduled for October 18. In September, federal prosecutors asked the court to revoke the bond after she allegedly failed multiple drug tests. On November 15, Taylor was sentenced to 21 months in prison. On December 15, Taylor was sentenced to 2 years in state prison for the felony child neglect charges. Her release date was set for May 13, 2026.

In April 2024, a grand jury charged the school's former assistant principal, Ebony Parker, with eight counts of felony child neglect. It was reported that Parker was told of the threat, but took no action to respond, according to the report from the grand jury. A trial was set to begin in February 2025, but was delayed in April 2025, to a then unknown date. The Washington Post later reported that the trial was set to begin in mid-November 2025, though it was then further delayed to May 2026.

On November 6, 2025, a Virginia jury awarded $10 million to Zwerner in her civil lawsuit against former assistant principal Ebony Parker. The judgment was based on Zwerner's accusation that Parker ignored repeated warnings from school staff members that the 6-year-old student who shot Zwerner had a gun in his backpack. Zwerner had originally sought $40 million against the former administrator. On May 21, 2026, the criminal case against Ebony Parker was officially dismissed citing lack of precedent, with Judge Rebecca Robinson saying the evidence did not amount to a crime under Virginia law.

== Responses ==
Later in January, the parents of the six-year-old shooter released an anonymized statement via their attorney that stated that he had an acute disability. In May 2023 the family of the shooter claimed that the boy had been diagnosed with ADHD, but had started medication and was meeting academic goals leading to his parents not attending classes with him. The boy's mother also claimed that the boy had accidentally broken Zwerner's phone, instead of intentionally breaking it, which had led to the one-day suspension. However, this claim was not supported by Zwerner.

Newport News mayor Phillip Jones described the shooting as "a red flag for our country", also saying, "I do think that after this event, there is going to be a nationwide discussion on how these sorts of things can be prevented." Gun violence expert Daniel Webster of Johns Hopkins University stated that gun violence by children was increasing in frequency.

The American Federation of Teachers president Randi Weingarten called for government action to prevent guns from being taken into schools: "When will the shock of gunshots in school be enough to inspire the action necessary to prevent guns in schools and the shattering of lives it causes?"

Giffords Law Center to Prevent Gun Violence lawyer Allison Anderman criticized Virginia for not having laws requiring guns to be securely stored. Virginia governor Glenn Youngkin shared his belief that Virginia had "some of the toughest gun laws in the nation" and spoke of a need for harsher criminal sentencing and improved mental health care.

== Similar events ==
On February 16, 2023, another six-year-old child took a gun to a school in Virginia. The mother of a child in the school claimed that the boy threatened to shoot her daughter. The boy's mother was charged with contributing to the delinquency of a minor and allowing access to a loaded firearm by children.

== See also ==
- List of attacks related to primary schools
- List of school shootings in the United States (2000–present)
