= Lonnie Young =

American football player (born 1963)

No. 43, 31, 44
- Positions: Cornerback, Safety

Personal information
- Born: July 18, 1963 (age 63); Flint, Michigan, U.S.
- Listed height: 6 ft 2 in (1.88 m)
- Listed weight: 205 lb (93 kg)

Career information
- High school: Beecher (Beecher, Michigan)
- College: Michigan State (1981–1984)
- NFL draft: 1985: 12th round, 325th overall pick

Career history

Playing
- St. Louis/Phoenix Cardinals (1985–1990); New York Jets (1991–1993); San Diego Chargers (1994); New York Jets (1995–1996)

Operations
- New York Jets (2002) Area scout; Arizona Cardinals (2003–2007) Regional scout; Baltimore Ravens (2008–2019) National Scout; Pittsburgh Maulers (2023) General manager

Awards and highlights
- Super Bowl champion (XLVII)

Career NFL statistics
- Total tackles: 728
- Sacks: 3.5
- Forced fumbles: 1
- Fumble recoveries: 14
- Interceptions: 11
- Stats at Pro Football Reference

Lonnie Young (born July 18, 1963) is an American professional football executive and former cornerback and safety. He played college football for the Michigan State Spartans, and was selected by the St. Louis Cardinals in the twelfth round of the 1985 NFL draft.

== Early life ==
Young was born in Flint, Michigan. He attended Beecher High School where he played football, basketball and track and field.

== College career ==
Young starred in football at Michigan State University. He played football under head coach Muddy Waters and played his junior and senior season under George Perles. In his senior season, Young recorded 3 interceptions. Michigan State went 6–6 that year, making it to their first bowl game since 1966, but they were defeated by the Army Cadets in the Cherry Bowl.

== Executive career ==
=== Pittsburgh Maulers ===
On October 19, 2022, Young was named the general manager of the Pittsburgh Maulers. On January 1, 2024, it was announced the Maulers would not be a part of the UFL Merger.
