= Curt Jones =

Curt Jones may refer to:

- Curt Jones, inventor of Dippin' Dots
- Curt Jones (musician) in Aurra and Slave (band)

== See also ==
- Curtis Jones (disambiguation)
