= 2019 Beijing school attack =

School attack in China

- Location: 39.875372°N 116.362667°E; Xuanwu Normal Experimental Affiliated No. 1 Primary School, Beijing, China
- Date: January 8, 2019 c. 11:17 a.m. (CST; UTC+08:00)
- Target: Students
- Attack type: Bludgeoning
- Weapon: Hammer
- Deaths: 0
- Injuries: 20
- Perpetrator: Jia
- Motive: Job loss

On January 8, 2019, a school attack occurred at Xuanwu Normal Experimental Affiliated No. 1 Primary School in Beijing, China. A 49-year-old man attacked children with a hammer. Twenty people were injured.

== Incident ==
The attack happened around 11:17 a.m. The attacker, 49-year-old Jia, used the hammer that he usually used at work. During the break between classes, he started hitting students with the hammer on the first-floor stairs. The perpetrator was detained at the scene.

In a video shared on Chinese social media, staff members were seen trying to explain the incident to worried parents.

=== Victims ===
Twenty children were hurt. Out of those, three were badly injured, but they are in stable condition. All the hurt students were hospitalized. Also, all the victims were second graders.

== Perpetrator ==
The perpetrator was a man named Jia, (Note: Jia is his last name.) 49 at the time of the attack. He came from the northern province of Heilongjiang. He was a maintenance worker sent to work at the school. Jia's contract was ending in January, and the company did not renew it.

== See also ==
- List of school attacks in China
- List of attacks related to primary schools
- 2019 in China
