= Kristen Pittman =

American murderer (born 1989)

- Born: Christopher Frank Pittman; April 9, 1989 (age 37)
- Status: Paroled
- Penalty: Life imprisonment with the possibility of parole after 30 years

Details
- Locations: Chester, South Carolina, U.S.
- Killed: 2
- Weapon: Shotgun

Kristen Avery Pittman (born Christopher Frank Pittman, April 9, 1989) is an American criminal convicted in 2005 of murdering her grandparents, Joe and Joy Pittman, on November 28, 2001, when she was 12 years old. The case drew national attention due to her age and her defense that Zoloft influenced her actions. Pittman was sentenced to 30 years to life in prison.

== Medication ==
At age twelve, Pittman ran away from home twice, threatened suicide, was picked up by police, and confined for six days to a facility for troubled or runaway children. While there, she was put on Paxil for mild depression. Her father, Joe, sent her away from their home in Oxford, Florida, to live with her grandparents in Chester, South Carolina. Her paternal grandparents had been a source of stability to her for years in a life with a mother who left her twice and a father whom Pittman claimed was abusive.

With no samples of Paxil, Pittman's doctor in Chester gave her Zoloft instead. Although both drugs are SSRIs (selective serotonin reuptake inhibitors) with similar modes of selective action, abruptly substituting one for the other is usually not advisable. Almost immediately Pittman allegedly began to experience negative side-effects from the new medication; her sister went so far as to describe her as "manic." She purportedly experienced a burning sensation all over her body which required pain medication. She complained about the side effects of the drug. At a subsequent doctor's visit, her dosage was increased from 25 mg daily to 50 mg daily. Zoloft does have several side-effects in children, including aggravated depression, abnormal dreams, paranoid reactions, hallucinations, aggressive behavior, and delusions. Risks from overdose include potential "manic reactions."

== Murders ==
On November 28, 2001, Pittman had an argument on the school bus, choked a fellow student, and later disturbed the piano player at her church. That night, after her grandfather paddled her for attempting to leave her room when told not to, Pittman entered her grandparents' bedroom and murdered them with their shotgun. She then set fire to the house using a candle and papers. Pittman took her grandparents' car, their guns, her dog, and $33, and left. She was picked up after getting stuck two counties away. Before confessing, she told a story that large black male murdered her grandparents, set fire to the house, and kidnapped her. When she ultimately confessed, she proclaimed that her grandparents deserved what they got. Pittman's father testified that her Zoloft dosage was doubled two days before the incident.

== Trial and appeals ==
On Monday, January 31, 2005, three years after the murders, her trial as an adult began. The case involved several important issues, including considerations of mental capacity regarding her age and the impact of Zoloft on her mental state. There was also a consideration of whether her crime was murder or some form of manslaughter. Ultimately, trial focused on the Zoloft. The prosecution focused on proving that Pittman knew the difference between right and wrong, and her culpable mental status was proven by the fact that she planned to cover the crime and escape before the fire started (by use of the candle), and the steps she took while fleeing the scene.

On February 15, 2005, Pittman was convicted of murder and sentenced to 30 years in prison. Some controversy existed about the verdict: two jurors admitted feeling coerced into their decision, and another juror discussed the trial with his wife and bartender during deliberations. On October 5, 2006, the South Carolina Supreme Court heard oral arguments on her appeal. A petition to pardon Pittman was also presented then. The justices were also asked to postpone moving Pittman to an adult penitentiary, but the delay was denied. On June 11, 2007, the Court affirmed Pittman's conviction by a vote of 4-1. Discovery Channel later in 2006 aired an episode of 48 Hours devoted to the case. On April 14, 2008, the United States Supreme Court declined to hear an appeal, which was based on an Eighth Amendment claim of cruel and unusual punishment (lengthy sentence for a child).

On July 27, 2010, South Carolina Circuit Court Judge Roger Young approved Pittman's post conviction relief petition and granted her a new trial based on a finding of ineffective counsel. In November 2010, Judge Young refused a request by the state to reconsider this decision. In December 2010, Pittman entered into a plea bargain by which she pleaded guilty to voluntary manslaughter and received a 25-year sentence including time served from a 30-year to life sentence. She was imprisoned in the Allendale Correctional Institution with a projected release date of 22 February 2023.

After she was released on February 22, 2023, she had to complete two years of state supervision through a South Carolina probation office.

== Personal life ==
Pittman is a transgender woman, saying her family had known this "since [she] was 12 years old".

Pittman filed a lawsuit against prison officials in South Carolina, requesting gender confirmation surgery and prescription hormone medication while in prison. The treatment was denied and the lawsuit was dismissed.
