= South Bay Correctional Facility =

Prison in Florida

Coordinates: 26°39′28″N 80°43′10″W

South Bay Correctional and Rehabilitation Facility
- Interactive map of South Bay Correctional and Rehabilitation Facility
- Location: 600 Us Highway 27 South South Bay, Florida
- Status: mixed
- Capacity: 1948
- Opened: 1997
- Managed by: GEO Group

The South Bay Correctional Facility is a private state prison for men located in South Bay, Palm Beach County, Florida, which is operated by GEO Group under contract with the Florida Department of Corrections. This facility was opened in 1997 and has a maximum capacity of 1948 prisoners.

In September 2012, a jury awarded a South Bay inmate a $1.2 million settlement for the loss of an eye during a fight with another inmate.

== Notable inmates ==
Inmate Name	Register Number	Status	Details
Timothy Humphrey	930490	Serving a life sentence.	Convicted in his involvement of the 2003 Murder of Sandra Rozzo in which his partner, Ashley Humphrey, killed Rozzo in her own garage.

- Joel Faviere - American musician and former lead singer of Get Scared - sentenced to 12 years for child pornography charges and registered as a sex offender. Faviere's release will be September 16, 2029.
- Curtis Jones - Youngest person tried as an adult for murder at the time of his conviction. Released in 2015.
