= Airway Heights Corrections Center =

Men's state prison in Airway Heights, Washington

Airway Heights Corrections Center (AHCC)
- Location in Washington
- Location: Airway Heights, Spokane County, Washington; 47°39′12″N 117°34′42″W
- Status: Operational
- Security class: Minimum, Medium
- Capacity: 2,258
- Opened: 1992
- Managed by: Washington State Department of Corrections
- Warden: Ronald Haynes, Superintendent
- Website: www.doc.wa.gov/corrections/incarceration/prisons/ahcc.htm

The Airway Heights Corrections Center is a state prison for men located in Airway Heights, Spokane County, Washington, owned and operated by the Washington State Department of Corrections.

The facility was first opened in 1992, and has a working capacity of 2258 at minimum and medium security levels.

== Notable inmates ==
- Gerald Friend, serial rapist and kidnapper.
- Nick McDonald, McCleary murderer, along with Brian Bassett, known for killing Bassett's parents and younger brother in 1995.
- Evan Drake Savoie, Ephrata murderer, known for killing Craig Sorger in 2003.
- Warren Forrest, serial killer.
- David Lewis Rice, perpetrator of the 1985 Murder of the Goldmark family.
