= Corning Union Elementary School District =

School district in California, United States

Address
- 1005 Hoag Street Corning, California, 96021; United States

District information
- Type: Public
- Grades: K–8
- NCES District ID: 0609780

Students and staff
- Students: 1,986 (2020–2021)
- Teachers: 86.71 (FTE)
- Staff: 127.37 (FTE)
- Student–teacher ratio: 22.9:1

Other information
- Website: www.corningelementary.org

Corning Union Elementary School District is a public school district based in Tehama County, California.

== History ==
=== 2017 shooting ===
On November 14, 2017, a shooting occurred near Rancho Tehama Elementary School. Five people were killed while multiple others were wounded. The shooter attempted to enter the school but was unable to do so as staff members had placed the school on lockdown after hearing gunshots. He shot at the school for approximately six minutes, injuring one student. The gunman was later shot and killed by local authorities.

== Education ==
=== Middle school ===
- Maywood Middle School

=== Elementary school ===
- Olive View Elementary School
- Rancho Tehama Elementary School
- West Street Elementary School
- Woodson Elementary School
