= Curtis Jones (murderer) =

Youngest person in America to be tried and convicted for murder

Curtis Fairchild Jones
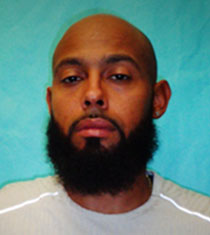
- Jones's FDOC photo
- Born: 31 May 1986 (age 40); Alabama, United States
- Relatives: Catherine Jones (sister)
- Criminal charge: Murder

Curtis Fairchild Jones (born May 31, 1986, in Alabama) is an American man who, aged twelve, was the youngest murder defendant in the United States to face trial as an adult. He and his 13-year-old sister Catherine killed his father's girlfriend in 1999 with a stolen pistol. After conviction of second-degree murder, he was imprisoned in South Bay Correctional Facility, Florida, until July 28, 2015.

He is now a Christian minister.
