= Paul Walker (judge) =

Sir Paul Walker
- Royal coat of arms of the United Kingdom

Justice of the High Court
- In office 2004–2019

Personal details
- Born: 1954 (age 71–72)
- Education: Magdalen College, Oxford

Sir Paul James Walker (born 1954), styled The Hon. Mr Justice Walker, was a High Court judge.

He was educated at St Peter's College, Adelaide and Magdalen College, Oxford.

He was called to the bar at Gray's Inn in 1979 and became a bencher there in 2005. He was made a QC in 1999, and judge of the High Court of Justice (Queen's Bench Division) since 2004. In 2019, he retired from the bench and returned to practice.
