= Beecher Community School District =

School district in Michigan, United States

Address
- 1020 W. Coldwater Rd. Flint, Michigan, Genesee, Michigan, 48505; United States

District information
- Type: Public school district
- Grades: Prekindergarten-12
- Superintendent: Jendayi Gardner
- Schools: 3
- Budget: $14,754,000 2022-2023 expenditures
- NCES District ID: 2604500

Students and staff
- Students: 551 (2024-2025)
- Teachers: 36.35 FTE (2024-2025)
- Staff: 128.82 FTE (2024-2025)
- Student–teacher ratio: 15.16 (2024-2025)

Other information
- Website: www.beecherschools.org

Beecher Community School District is a public school district in Genesee County in the U.S. state of Michigan and in the Genesee Intermediate School District. It serves the census-designated place of Beecher which is just north of Flint.

== History ==
Beecher High School was designed by the firm of Lyndon and Smith. In 1938, it was included on a list of the finest school buildings in the country by the American Institute of Architects.

The high school took heavy damage in the 1953 Flint-Beecher tornado, which killed 116 people in the community. The tornado destroyed the roofs of the gymnasium and auditorium, but school was not in session at the time. The parking lot was used by the Salvation Army as a central disaster relief station. That August, volunteers rebuilding the neighborhood used the roofless gymnasium for a dance.

In 2004, because the district had a $1.8 million deficit and a decline in enrollment of 600 students over five years, the school board closed the Beecher High School building. Its students were relocated to the middle school.

As of 2025, $20 million has been raised to renovate and reopen Beecher High School.

== Schools ==
School	Address	Notes
Beecher Adult Education Center	1020 W. Coldwater Road, Flint	Located at Ira A. Rutherford, III Building (district administration center).
Beecher High School	6255 Neff Rd., Mount Morris	Serves grades 7 through 12
Dailey Elementary School	6236 Neff Rd., Mount Morris	Serves preschool through 6th grade
Beecher Higher Learning Academy	1020 W. Coldwater Road, Flint	Alternative education options

== Notable events ==
In 1972, high school assistant principal Paul Cabell Jr. committed suicide. He was distraught over recent fighting and racial tension between the school's 350 Black and 650 white students.

The district gained national attention on February 29, 2000, when six-year-old Kayla Rolland was shot and killed by a classmate at Buell Elementary School. Buell Elementary was closed in 2002 and demolished in 2008.

== Athletics ==
Beecher's mascot is the Beecher Buccaneer.

== Notable graduates ==
- Carl Banks, linebacker for the New York Giants, Washington Redskins, and Cleveland Browns
- Lonnie Young, safety/cornerback for the St. Louis/Phoenix Cardinals, New York Jets, and San Diego Chargers
- Duane D. Hackney, the most decorated enlisted person in history of the U.S. Air Force
- Courtney Hawkins, wide receiver for Tampa Bay Buccaneers, and Pittsburgh Steelers
- Roy Marble, former Iowa Hawkeyes and NBA player
- Monté Morris, point guard for the Detroit Pistons of the NBA, former standout point guard for Iowa State Cyclones, former Mr. Basketball Michigan, winner of 3 Class C MHSAA State Championships
