= Death of Silje Redergård =

1994 child murder in Norway

Silje Marie Redergård (26 June 1989 – 15 October 1994) was a five-year-old Norwegian girl who was allegedly killed by two boys in the suburb of Rosten at Tiller near Trondheim on 15 October 1994.

== Incident and investigation ==
The boys, aged five and six, were claimed to have beaten, kicked, stoned, and stripped Redergård naked, leaving her in the snow to die of hypothermia. The boys were directed to undergo psychological evaluation, as Norwegian law did not allow the punishment of minors under the age of 15. The names of the boys were not publicly released.

In 2021, the crime underwent new research. In 1994, police never followed up on the claims reported by the 5-year-old and the 6-year-old, that the girl had been killed by rampant teenage boys, even though the children’s statements matched what had also been observed and reported by separate witnesses. Police ignored these witness reports matching the children's own statements. The Kripos-expert Per Angell has explained that the prints of children's boots in the snow could not be connected to the three small boys who were found to have caused Redergård's death, and that no forensic evidence existed to connect them to her death. Police officer Asbjørn Rachlew pointed out that police interrogated the small boys in a fashion that made the boys change their explanations under pressure and over time. In addition, no research was undertaken regarding fingerprints, clothes fibres, patterns on bootprints on her body and in the snow, or other forensic issues. A TV-production in 4 parts by NRK has gone through the missing research and mistakes in the case, classing it a miscarriage of justice.

== Motives ==
The crime was initially believed to be of a sexually abusive-parental nature, as Redergård's clothes were removed, and her body was found close to her family's home. Redergård's parents were told who the culprits were by the mother of the boys who committed the crime, before the police found out.

There is no fully known motive for the killing, although one of the boys told a detective that "We beat her till she stopped crying" during the initial investigation, perhaps explaining a partial reason for why they would beat her to death.

== Debate regarding fictionalised violence ==
On 18 October 1994, pay television channel TV3 suspended airing of Mighty Morphin Power Rangers and Teenage Mutant Ninja Turtles, amid debate regarding the impact of fictionalised violence in television programming aimed at children. Gro Harlem Brundtland, Norway's Prime Minister at the time, commented that "Norwegians should think twice before allowing such 'free market' violence to be broadcast by commercial networks."

== Fate of alleged perpetrators ==
Both boys were ordered to regularly meet with child protective services, and to undergo counseling until they turned 18. One of the boys has suffered with drug addiction and homelessness, allegedly due in some part to his role in the killing.

== Similar cases ==
The case has been compared to the murder of James Bulger, which took place in the United Kingdom twenty months earlier.

== See also ==
- Child murder § By other children
