= Murder of Shawn Seesahai =

2023 murder by stabbing in Wolverhampton, England

- Date: 13 November 2023
- Location: Wolverhampton, England
- Coordinates: 52°34′33″N 2°05′28″W
- Convicted: 2
- Trial: 2 May – 10 June 2024
- Convictions: Murder; Possession of a knife in a public place
- Sentence: Life imprisonment with a minimum of 8.5 years which was then increased to a minimum of 10 years in December 2024.

On 13 November 2023, 19-year-old Shawn Seesahai was attacked and killed by two 12-year-old boys during a confrontation in a park in Wolverhampton, England. The perpetrators were the youngest people to be convicted of murder in the United Kingdom since the murder of James Bulger in 1993, and the youngest to have been convicted of murder using a knife. The two boys, whose names the media were not permitted to publish due to their young age, were both sentenced, on 27 September 2024, to detention in a young offender institution at His Majesty's pleasure for a minimum term of eight years and six months.

== Background ==
=== Shawn Seesahai ===
Seesahai was 19 years old when he was murdered on 13 November 2023. He had come to the United Kingdom from his home in the British Overseas Territory of Anguilla to receive medical treatment six months before his death. He was living in Birmingham, West Midlands.

His family spent their life savings to repatriate his body back to Anguilla and had to take out a loan to attend the trial, earlier in 2024. His parents could not afford to attend the sentencing in September 2024.

=== Perpetrators ===
One of the boys was described as having been groomed and exploited by "older youths and young men in the wider community who encouraged him towards the possession of knives". He had purchased the machete used in the killing for £40 two months before the incident.

The two boys were aged 12 at the time of the murder and 13 when sentenced. Under section 45 of the Youth Justice and Criminal Evidence Act 1999, media covering the case were prohibited from publishing the boys' names; the trial judge, Mrs Justice Tipples, refused to waive this, ruling that their welfare outweighed the public interest.

== Murder ==
On 13 November 2023, Seesahai travelled to Wolverhampton from Birmingham with two friends. Seesahai and a friend were waiting in Stowlawn Playing Fields in Stow Heath when a confrontation took place between them and the boys over a bench, or because one of the boys had shoulder-barged Seesahai unprovoked.

One of the boys claimed during the trial that Seesahai and another man had approached the two boys and a female friend while they were sitting on a park bench, and that Seesahai had attacked them, put one of the boys in a headlock, and attempted to run away but tripped; one of the boys then proceeded to stab Seesahai to death with the other's machete. The second boy claimed he was nowhere near Seesahai when the other boy attacked him with the machete.

Seesahai's friend stated that they were in the park drinking Red Bull and discussing their Christmas plans when they were attacked, unprovoked, by the two boys. Seesahai was shoulder-barged by one boy. They both then attempted to run away when one of the boys unsheathed a machete, but Seesahai tripped and was stabbed repeatedly; his friend stated during the trial "I was running for my life – I couldn't stay there and watch".

== Trial ==
The trial took place at Nottingham Crown Court and began on 2 May 2024. Jurors heard that Seesahai had been stabbed in the back, legs, and skull, and was also beaten; he was attacked with such ferocity that one wound almost passed through his body, and his skull was struck so hard that a "piece of bone had actually come away". During the trial, the defendants sought to blame each other, but the jury convicted them both of murder on 10 June 2024.

== Sentencing ==
Despite not determining which of the boys delivered the fatal stab wound, the judge decided that both boys were responsible for Seesahai's death. On 27 September 2024, the two boys were both sentenced to detention at His Majesty's pleasure (i.e. equivalent a life sentence) and will serve a minimum term of eight years and six months in a young offender institution. The starting point for the minimum term set by sentencing guidelines was 13 years' detention, but the sentence was adjusted downwards for both boys due to mitigating factors, including their young age and troubled upbringings. If the Parole Board is satisfied that they can be released from detention, they will remain on licence for life.

The perpetrators are the youngest people to be convicted of murder in the United Kingdom since the killing of James Bulger in 1993. Given that Sharon Carr, who was the same age as Seesahai's killers when she stabbed Katie Rackliff to death in 1992, was not convicted until age 17, Seesahai's killers are the youngest in the UK to have been convicted of a murder where the weapon used was a knife.

In December 2024, the Court of Appeal increased the minimum term each of the boy will serve from eight-and-a-half years to 10 years.
