= Killing of Kayla Rolland =

2000 shooting in Michigan, US

- Undated photo of Rolland
- Location: 43.080278°N 83.705556°W; Mount Morris Township, Michigan, U.S.
- Date: February 29, 2000; 26 years ago 10:29 a.m. (EST)
- Attack type: Child-on-child homicide by shooting, manslaughter, school shooting
- Weapon: .32-caliber Davis Industries P-32 handgun
- Victims: Kayla Renee Rolland, aged 6
- Perpetrator: 6-year-old unnamed male student
- Motive: Resentment
- Verdict: No contest (James); Guilty (Winfrey)
- Convictions: Involuntary manslaughter (James); Possession of a stolen handgun (Winfrey)
- Sentence: 2 to 15 years in prison (James); 3 years of probation (Winfrey)
- Convicted: Jamelle James (family friend); Sir Marcus Winfrey (shooter's uncle)

Kayla Renee Rolland (May 12, 1993 – February 29, 2000) was a six-year-old American girl from Mount Morris Township, Michigan, United States, who was fatally shot on February 29, 2000, by a six-year-old classmate at Buell Elementary School in Beecher Community School District. The boy had found the gun while living at his uncle's house; the house was a crack house where guns were frequently traded for drugs.

The killing drew worldwide attention due to the particularly young ages of the victim and the perpetrator: Rolland was the youngest school shooting victim in the United States until the Sandy Hook Elementary School shooting in 2012, and her assailant remains the youngest fatal school shooting perpetrator to date. The boy was not charged with murder because of his age. Buell Elementary School closed in 2002 and was demolished in 2009.

19-year-old Jamelle James, a family friend with whom the perpetrator was living, was charged with involuntary manslaughter for leaving the gun in a shoe box in his bedroom where the 6-year-old could access it. He and two other men, 19-year-old Robert Lee Morris III and 22-year-old Sir Marcus Winfrey, also faced federal firearm charges. Morris sold the weapon, which was stolen, to James and Winfrey. James and Morris pleaded guilty to possession of a stolen 12-gauge shotgun. Winfrey, an uncle of the shooter, pleaded guilty to possession of the stolen firearm used to kill Rolland.

Winfrey was sentenced to three years of probation. James later pleaded no contest to involuntary manslaughter and was sentenced to up to 15 years in prison. He was paroled in 2002, after serving two years and five months in prison. However, James remained imprisoned for his federal firearm conviction until 2003.

== Background ==
Kayla Rolland was killed by a six-year-old boy, a first grader at Buell Elementary School in the Beecher Community School District, located in Mount Morris Township, Michigan, near Flint. His father was in jail for violating his parole, having previously been convicted for possession of cocaine with intent to deliver and burglary. The boy had been living with his mother and his eight-year-old brother. She was evicted from her home, having been unable to pay rent with the $175 weekly wage she received from the two jobs she worked under Michigan's welfare-to-work program, and both boys then shared a single sofa as a bed at their uncle's house. The home, where his uncle lived with a 19-year-old man, was a crack house where guns were frequently traded for drugs. At some point, the boy found a loaded Davis Industries P-32 .32-caliber handgun under some blankets.

The boy was known to have behavioral issues and was made to stay after school nearly every day for swearing, giving people the finger, pinching, and hitting. Some weeks before the shooting he stabbed a girl with a pencil. Chris Boaz, a seven-year-old classmate, claimed the boy once punched him because he would not give him a pickle. The boy had previously attacked Kayla Rolland and, on the day prior to the killing, tried to kiss her and was rebuffed. Early on the day of the shooting, the boy and his brother got into a fight with Boaz's 10-year-old uncle, whom the boy threatened to shoot.

== Shooting ==
On February 29, 2000, the boy brought the firearm and a knife with him to school. During a change of classes, he fatally shot six-year-old Kayla Rolland in the presence of a teacher and 22 students while they were climbing the stairs, saying to her "I don't like you" before pulling the trigger. The bullet entered her right arm and traveled through a vital artery. He then threw the handgun into a trash basket and fled to a nearby restroom. He was found there, in the corner, by a teacher and was taken into police custody soon after. At 10:29 a.m. EST, Rolland was pronounced dead at Hurley Medical Center while in cardiac arrest. The assailant was held in custody until the Genesee County Family Independence Agency could determine his placement. He and his two younger siblings were later placed with an aunt.

== Legal ==
Rolland's assailant became the youngest school shooter in the United States. Despite Michigan not having a codified age of criminal responsibility, he was not charged with any crime based on the legal claim that at the age of six he would lack the ability to form intent. Many of the people involved in the case viewed the boy as just as much of a victim of the situation as Rolland, including Rolland's mother and Genesee County prosecutor Arthur Busch. Busch said that the boy had "no idea what he had done" and was too young to comprehend the "enormity or gravity of what had actually occurred."

Jamelle James, a friend of the family who owned the .32-caliber pistol used in the shooting, was charged with involuntary manslaughter for leaving the gun in a shoe box in his bedroom. A search of James's house produced a stolen pump-action shotgun and a rock of crack cocaine. James, 19-year-old Robert Lee Morris III, and 22-year-old Sir Marcus Winfrey, also faced federal firearm charges related to the shooting of Rolland. Morris had sold the weapon, which was stolen, to James and Winfrey. Morris and James pleaded guilty to the possession of the stolen shotgun and Winfrey pleaded guilty to possession of the stolen handgun used to kill Rolland.

On August 22, 2000, James pleaded no contest to involuntary manslaughter in a deal with the prosecution. He was later sentenced to 2 to 15 years in prison. Morris was sentenced to 18 months in federal prison and Winfrey was sentenced to three years of probation.

James was paroled in 2002, after serving two years and five months in prison. He remained imprisoned for his federal firearm conviction until November 17, 2003.

On the twentieth anniversary of the shooting on February 29, 2020, news media reported that the boy who shot Kayla Rolland was living in Bay City, Michigan. According to court records, he had been convicted at age 18 of a felony in connection with charges of second degree home invasion and larceny at a Bay City house on April 23, 2012, and sentenced to two years of probation.

== Aftermath ==
At the time, Kayla Rolland was believed to have been the youngest school shooting victim in United States history, which was not surpassed until the Sandy Hook Elementary School shooting in December 2012. A day after Rolland's death, a shooting spree occurred in Wilkinsburg, Pennsylvania that killed three and injured two others. In response to the Wilkinsburg case, U.S. President Bill Clinton argued for stricter gun laws and mentioned Rolland's case as an example.

== Depiction in media ==
Rolland's killing was cited by Michael Moore in his 2002 film Bowling for Columbine, which argued for stricter gun control.

== See also ==
- List of youngest killers
- List of school shootings in the United States by death toll
- List of school shootings in the United States (2000–present)
- List of homicides in Michigan
- Shooting of Abby Zwerner, another school shooting that was also committed by a six-year-old in Newport News, Virginia
