= Trial as an adult =

Legal situation

Trial as an adult is a situation in which a juvenile offender is tried as if they were an adult, whereby they may receive a longer or more serious sentence than would otherwise be possible if they were charged as a juvenile.

While there are specific protections that exist for juvenile offenders (such as suppression of an offender's name, picture, a closed courtroom, or a record sealing in which case the proceedings are not made public) these protections may be waived.

== United States ==
The first juvenile court in the United States was established in 1899 in Cook County, Illinois. Before this time, it was widely held that children 7 years old and older were capable of criminal intent and were therefore punished as adults. Traditionally, these juvenile courts focused on the offenders instead of the offenses and worked toward a goal of rehabilitation. These courts also arose from a growing belief that instead of being "miniature adults", children and adolescents possess moral and cognitive capabilities that are not quite fully developed.

After a dramatic increase in violent juvenile offenses in the 1980s and 1990s, a greater number of juveniles were transferred from juvenile court to criminal court for their crimes. The reason behind this is an immediate consequence to "reported escalations of juvenile violent crime" and the questioning that certain offenses and violations are far past any rehabilitation or change in behavior. Since the 1970s, some have sought to abolish the juvenile court, arguing that prosecuting juvenile offenders in criminal court offers better protection to society, gives restorative justice for victims, and holds juveniles responsible for their actions. However, others seek to maintain the juvenile justice system because it might be of value in confronting and tackling the more general crimes of children.

=== Criminal court vs. juvenile court ===
There are several differences between juvenile court and criminal court in the United States. One of the most significant differences is the intent of the two systems; the focus of the juvenile justice system is on rehabilitation and future reintegration, while the goal of the criminal justice system is punishment and deterrence of future crime. In juvenile court rulings, decisions often take psychosocial factors into account along with current offense severity and the youth's offense history. In contrast, in criminal proceedings, the severity of the offense and criminal history weigh most heavily in sentencing outcome. Upon release, those who pass through the juvenile justice system receive parole-like surveillance along with reintegration programs, reflecting the belief that juvenile behavior can be changed. Those released from prison receive surveillance which serves to monitor and report illegal behavior.

=== Transfer to criminal court ===
During the 1980s and 1990s murders by juveniles increased dramatically, which resulted in new legislation that allowed for more juveniles to be transferred to criminal court. These changes, many of which took place between 1992 and 1995, included lowering the age of judicial transfer, adding to the list of transferable offenses, and creating automatic transfer laws for certain ages and offenses. In 1994, it was found that the United States transferred roughly 13,000 juveniles to adult courts a year, with approximately 36% of those transfers involving youth who committed violent offenses.

There are four main processes by which juvenile defendants can be transferred to criminal court:

1. Judicial Waiver: Juvenile court judges have the ability to transfer juveniles to criminal court, usually takes into account age and severity of offense
2. Prosecutorial Discretion: Prosecutors have the authority to file cases in juvenile court or criminal court jurisdiction
3. Statutory exclusion: The juvenile's case starts and must be heard in adult court if the juvenile is charged with an "excluded" offense. Most common excluded offenses are murder and rape.
4. "Once an adult, always an adult" or "Once waived/always waived": State laws that require juveniles to be tried in criminal court if any previous crimes were seen in criminal court

The juvenile transfer processes usually carry a subprocess in them, and the prosecutor has the burden of proving the juvenile is not fit for juvenile court. Juvenile waiver has 3, with "discretionary waiver", which a judge reviews all the factors and decides whether or not to transfer, "presumptive waiver", the burden of proof transfers to the juvenile and must prove themselves amenable to treatment, and "mandatory waiver" where, although the case starts in juvenile court, the juvenile court is only there to verify it has met the mandatory waiver requirements (most common is probable cause), and if met, will be transferred to adult court.

Direct file additionally will have age requirements for certain crimes. For example, in Florida, one must be at least 16 to have any felony direct filed, while minors aged 14–15 cannot be direct filed at all unless the charge is punishable by death or life without parole. Although dependent on the state, usually states will allow a "reverse waiver", where a charge originally filed in adult court can be transferred back to juvenile court if a juvenile files a motion.

Statutory exclusion is implemented very different among the states, and usually have age rules. For example, in one state it may exclude the crime of kidnapping committed by juveniles aged 16 and up regardless if a weapon was used or not, but will only exclude the crime of kidnapping for 15 year olds if they used a deadly weapon, or exclude juveniles of any age if they were convicted of felonies twice in juvenile court, and is charged with another crime.

For "once an adult, always an adult", some states, such as Delaware or California, does not require a conviction for the previous adult prosecuted offense, if charges were dropped, the next charge will be charged in criminal court, although there are restrictions (for example, in California, the current charge must be one that can be transferred to adult court normally), most states do require a conviction in adult court.

Twenty-three states have no minimum age in at least one judicial waiver or statutory exclusion provision allowing for the transfer of juveniles to adult court. In states where a minimum age is specified for all transfer provisions, age 14 is the most common minimum age.

=== Demographics ===
In 2003, 2.2 million arrests were made involving individuals under 18, with the most serious offenses most frequently involving larceny-theft, drug-abuse violations, and disorderly conduct. According to 1998 statistics from the Bureau of Justice, which looked at 7,100 transferred juveniles charged with felonies within 40 of the nation's largest urban counties, violent felony offenses made up 63.5% of the charges made against juvenile defendants in criminal court. Other offenses included property offenses (17.7%), drug offenses (15.1%) and public-disorder offenses (3.5%). Of this sample of juveniles, 23% were transferred to criminal court by judicial waiver, 34% by prosecutorial discretion, and 41.6% by statutory exclusion. Within this sample of juveniles, 96% percent were male. A majority of the juvenile defendants were African American (62%). The rest of the sample was made up of Caucasian (20%), Latino (16%) and other (2%). At time of arrest almost 40% of the juveniles were age 17, with 30.7% ages 16–17, 19.2% ages 15–16, 6.8% ages 14–15, and 0.3% less than 14 years of age.

In a study that looked at 1,829 youths, from ten to 17 years of age, it was found that females, non-Hispanic whites, and younger juveniles were less likely to be tried in adult criminal court than males, African Americans, Hispanics, and older youths. Among the juveniles transferred to adult criminal court, 66% had at least one psychiatric disorder and 43% had two or more psychiatric disorders. These prevalence rates are not significantly different from youths processed in juvenile court. Among juveniles who were processed in adult criminal court, those sentenced to adult prison had significantly greater odds of having a disruptive behavior disorder, a substance abuse disorder, or comorbid affective and anxiety disorders.

An estimated 250,000 youth are tried, sentenced, or incarcerated as adults every year across the United States.

=== Controversy ===
==== Advocates for the abolition of juvenile court ====
Critics of the juvenile court argue that the definitions of childhood and adolescence that were used to establish the first juvenile courts in America are no longer equivalent to the definitions of childhood and adolescence today. These critics state that the boundary between juvenile and adult is no longer as clear, as children appear to grow up faster, with more exposure to adult ideas, and as adults more often engage in juvenile behaviors and activities.

It is also argued that many juvenile jurisdictions are no longer taking a rehabilitative approach to juvenile delinquents, and are instead becoming more and more punitive, and that because of some of the modifications within the juvenile justice system (e.g. required to waive access to a jury of peers) these defendants are losing out on chances for better advocacy and they are not receiving all their rights as a trial defendant.

==== Competence of juveniles as trial defendants ====
There is much controversy surrounding the idea of trying and sentencing juveniles as adults in criminal court. This debate centers around the cognitive and moral capacities of juveniles.

There have been numerous attempts to conceptualize and organize the abilities needed to be deemed a competent defendant in criminal court. Competency can be defined as the ability to assist counsel and the ability to engage in proficient reasoning and judgment-making. To assist counsel, a defendant must be able to understand trial procedures, understand the charges against him or her, understand his or her rights in court, and must be able to engage in beneficial communication with his or her counsel. To demonstrate proficient reasoning and judgment in court-related matters, a defendant must understand that counsel will provide insight and aid, know when it is beneficial to waive certain rights, and comprehend repercussions of certain options within court proceedings.

==== General capabilities ====
It has been found that youths younger than 13 are lacking many of the abilities that older adolescent and adult defendants possess; namely a familiarity with court proceedings, a robust understanding of rights, a comprehension that defense attorneys are on the side of the defendant, and an ability to communicate effectively with counsel.

A 2003 study by Grisso et al. suggested that among a sample of 1,393 community youths (ages 11–17) and young adults (ages 18–24) and detained youth and young adults, those aged 15 and younger are unable to perform as well as older adolescent and young adults as trial defendants. It was found in this study that:

approximately one third of 11- to 13-year-olds and approximately one fifth of 14 to 15 year olds are as impaired in capacities relevant to adjudicative competence as are seriously mentally ill adults who would likely be considered incompetent to stand trial.

A study that looked exclusively at juveniles 16–17 years old who were directly filed to criminal court (i.e. transferred by prosecutorial discretion) found no significant differences in competence between these youth and older criminal defendants.

Regarding juveniles' knowledge about criminal court, it has been found that most adolescent offenders are ignorant of the transfer laws that may force them to be tried and sentenced as an adult, and it is suggested that a previous knowledge of these laws might have deterred them from committing their crime.

It has been shown that most mid-to-late adolescents are close to adults in cognitive abilities; however, they are less likely to use their abilities because of several reasons. First, juveniles have less experience in life. They are less likely to perceive risks and less likely to contemplate how present actions might affect their future situations. The teenage environment also poses several risks to vulnerable individuals. These at-risk adolescents are more often subjected to influences from other troublemaking youth, and opposing these influences has the possibility of resulting in poor outcomes, such as being rejected, suffering ridicule or being physically accosted. Adolescents are also less independent than adults in the decision-making process which could lead to more conforming behavior.

Younger adolescents are also more likely than adults and older adolescents to display compliance behavior with authority figures (e.g. make a plea agreement).

When evaluating a person's maturity of judgment, their responsibility (i.e. ability to act independently and take care of one's self), temperance (i.e. to avoid engaging in impulsive/extreme decision making), and perspective (i.e. the ability to assess a situation from different angles) are measured. It has been found that adolescents are less mature than college students, young adults and adults on the responsibility and perspective factors, with no difference between delinquent and non-delinquent youth. Further, maturity of judgment is a better predictor of total delinquency than age, gender, race, education level, socioeconomic status (SES), and anti-social decision making.

In the cases where juveniles have been deemed incompetent to stand trial, it has been found that these juveniles differ significantly from juveniles deemed competent. Incompetent juveniles are significantly younger than their counterpart competent juveniles, they are more likely to be wards of the state, more likely to be receiving special education services, and more likely to have suffered previous abuse.

==== Understanding rights ====
It has been found that juveniles' understanding and appreciation of their Miranda Rights is significantly impaired among those adolescents aged 11–15, with age and IQ being the best predictors of Miranda comprehension. Many adolescent defendants find that Miranda vocabulary and reading levels exceed their understanding, and when studying specific components of Miranda Rights, there are several ideas that juveniles find difficult to recognize. For example, 44% of juveniles think that waiting for the police to ask questions is the same as the right to remain silent and 61% of juveniles believe that one must talk in court. These beliefs show a lack of juveniles' understanding of one's right against self-incrimination. Further, 39% of juveniles think that if one pleads guilty, one still has the ability to try to prove his innocence. Defendants aged 15 and younger are also more likely than older defendants to waive the right to an attorney and to confess during police interrogations. Lastly, juveniles often misunderstand that they have the right to an attorney before and during a police interrogation, and erroneously believe that attorneys only serve innocent defendants.

===== Understanding plea-deals =====
Some research has found that if minors do not have proper representation, their understanding of a plea-deal will be lacking; this puts minors at an increased risk for due-process rights violations.

==== Attorney–client relationship ====
Juveniles' appreciation and understanding of attorney–client privileges are also lacking. When comparing juveniles and adults, juveniles are much more likely to refuse to talk to an attorney, even though it is the attorney's duty to help. When juveniles are asked if they trust their attorney, only 6.2% of juveniles related positively to disclosing information to their attorney. Further, juvenile male defendants and juvenile defendants from ethnic minority groups are less likely to trust their attorney or to disclose information about the case to their attorney than female and Caucasian defendants.

=== Jurors' perception of juvenile defendants ===
Researchers have found that jurors believe previously abused or intellectually disabled defendants are less receptive to rehabilitation, and that disabled juveniles should be held at less fault than non-disabled juveniles for crimes committed. In a 2009 mock jury study, when looking at a case of a previously maltreated juvenile charged with murder, the juvenile defendant was held at less fault by the jury when she was accused of killing her abuser.

=== Public opinion of juveniles in criminal court ===
There are several variables that have an effect on public willingness to transfer juvenile offenders to criminal court. The offender's age and level of offense (ex. use of a weapon) both influence public opinion. The older an offender is and the more serious his crime, the more likely the public is willing to transfer the offender. Neither criminal history nor victim information has been found to influence public willingness to transfer. African-Americans are also more likely than any other race to be targeted for transfer to criminal court.

Another study that looked at public attitudes toward transferring juveniles to adult court found that the seriousness of the crime is the most important factor in public attitudes shifting toward approval of transfer. The two other most important factors include age of offender and the offender's criminal history. However, seriousness of offense and age of offender outweigh whether the juvenile is a 1st time or a repeat offender in attitudes toward transfer. Transferring from juvenile to criminal can make the matter worse and can cause more psychological damage from the isolation and the oppressed feelings of not being able to be redeemed.

=== Outcomes of juveniles prosecuted in criminal courts ===
Although the sanctions are more serious in this kind of case than if the juvenile was tried as a child, certain allowances are still made due to the fact the offender is a minor. Recent research suggests that separate and different punishment—by which is meant depending on age as well as the facility and subsequent punishment—that minors may recover whereas older youth may be more likely to reoffend. These include a juvenile offender not being forced to serve time in an adult prison, or with adult prisoners. There was not a minimum age for juveniles to be subjected to the death penalty until Supreme Court decisions in 1989, and 2005. In 1989, in case Thompson v. Oklahoma, the court raised the minimum age to be put to death from 0, to 16. The same year, Stanford v. Kentucky upheld that 16 is old enough to face capital punishment, however in 2005, in case Roper v. Simmons, the age was raised from 16 to 18. Additionally, the United States Supreme Court held in Graham v. Florida (2010) that a sentence of life in prison without the possibility of parole could not be imposed on juvenile offenders for any crime except for murder, and held in Miller v. Alabama (2012) that a sentence of life imprisonment without parole for murder, while it may be still optionally imposed, it must be optional and cannot be mandatorily imposed, unlike adult defendants who may be subjected to mandatory sentences of life in prison without the possibility of release.

==== Short-term consequences ====
In 1989, researchers found that juveniles housed in adult facilities are:

- 5 times more likely to be sexually assaulted than youth held in juvenile detention centers
- 2 times more likely to be beaten by staff than youth held in juvenile detention centers
- 4.6 times more likely to commit suicide than the general adolescent population
- 7.7 times more likely to commit suicide than adolescents in juvenile detention centers

Additionally, juveniles who witness violence during incarceration, which is more likely in adult facilities, are less likely to be deterred from future crime.

Youth convicted as adults are at a greater risk of assault and death in adult jails and prisons.

==== Long-term consequences ====
Juveniles whose cases were seen in criminal court were more likely to reoffend and to reoffend sooner than matched samples of juveniles whose cases were seen in juvenile court. For example, juveniles tried and convicted as adults were found to be 32% more likely to commit another crime in the future than juveniles tried and adjudicated delinquent for similar crimes in the juvenile justice system.

==== Executions of juveniles ====
Since the reinstatement of the death penalty in 1976, 22 people have been executed in the United States for crimes committed during adolescence. However, in 2005 the juvenile death penalty was abolished, and cited as cruel and unusual punishment following the ruling of the Supreme Court in Roper v. Simmons.

Since 1990, only nine countries have executed offenders aged under 18 years at the time of their crime. These are the People's Republic of China (PRC), Democratic Republic of the Congo, Iran, Nigeria, Pakistan, Saudi Arabia, Sudan, the United States and Yemen.

== Worldwide ==
Around the world, each country has its own criteria for punishment of juveniles. However, despite international law, not every country has requirements for the punishment of children.

=== Canada ===
Under Canada's Youth Criminal Justice Act, if a young person 14-17 years old at the time of the offence is found guilty of an offence for which an adult would be liable to receive more than two years imprisonment, the Crown may seek an adult sentence. In order for an adult sentence to be imposed, the Crown must prove beyond a reasonable doubt, at the youth court, that:

1. The presumption of diminished moral blameworthiness of the young person has been rebutted in the case, and
2. No available youth sentence could hold the young person accountable

=== England and Wales ===
Juveniles are generally tried in a youth court. If a juvenile is charged with an offence that was committed alongside an adult, then both offenders will be tried in an adult magistrates' court, except if it is necessary in the interests of justice that they both be tried in Crown Court.

Juveniles may also be tried as adults in Crown Court for serious offences including homicide, certain firearms offences, offences where an equivalent adult could go to prison for over 14 years, and situations where the "dangerous offender" provisions of the Sentencing Act 2020 could apply.

Unlike in the Youth Court, trials are open to the public. Media name suppression can be waived at the discretion of the judge, but the young person has no authority in law to insist his/her own name be released.

=== Germany ===
Defendants aged 14–17 (juveniles "Jugendliche") and 18–20 ("Heranwachsende") will be tried in a youth court (§ 3 Jugendgerichtsgesetz), and there is no concept of trial as an adult for juveniles.

Defendants aged 18–20 will be tried as juveniles but in public proceedings, and sentenced as either juveniles or adults according to their maturity and the kind of offense, its circumstances or motivations (§ 105 JGG).

The court will involve the Jugendamt which will usually assess the defendants' level of maturity (non-binding to the court), be present during trial, and evaluate the need of Jugendamt interventions.

Juveniles cannot be put in prison for less than 6 months nor for more than 10 years. However, there is a movement to allow the indefinite detention of "very dangerous young criminals" after they have served their prison sentences, as it is already allowed for adult prisoners.

== See also ==
- Capital punishment of juveniles
- Youth Criminal Justice Act – Canadian law governing prosecution of youth offenders
