= Richthofen case =

Brazilian criminal case

- From left to the right: Suzane, Andreas, Marísia and Manfred von Richthofen
- Location: 23.6298471°S 46.6775320°W; Brooklin, São Paulo, Brazil
- Date: 31 October 2002; 24 years ago c. 00:00 a.m. (UTC−03:00)
- Target: Manfred von Richthofen; Marisia von Richthofen
- Attack type: Murder
- Weapons: Two iron bars and toilet towels
- Deaths: Manfred von Richthofen; Marisia con Richthofen
- Perpetrators: Suzane von Richthofen; Daniel Cravinhos; Cristian Cravinhos
- Motive: · Personal resentment of Daniel and Suzane against the couple · Desire to inherit the family's fortune

The Richthofen case concerns the murder of Manfred Albert von Richthofen and his wife, Marísia von Richthofen, and the subsequent investigation and trial. The couple were killed by brothers Daniel and Cristian Cravinhos at the direction of the couple’s daughter, Suzane von Richthofen.

Suzane and Daniel met in August 1999 and began a relationship shortly afterward. They became very close, but the relationship did not have the support of their families, especially the Richthofens, who forbade it. Suzane, Daniel, and Cristian then hatched a plan to fake a robbery and murder the Richthofen couple, so that the three of them could share Suzane's inheritance.

On October 31, 2002, Suzane opened the door to the family mansion in Brooklin, São Paulo, so that the Cravinhos brothers could enter the house. After that, they went to the second floor of the property and killed Manfred and Marísia by beating their heads.

The public's interest in the case was so intense that the TV Justiça network considered broadcasting the trial live. TV stations, radio stations, and photographers were even authorized to capture and broadcast sound and images of the opening and closing moments, but the final ruling denied authorization. Five thousand people signed up to occupy one of the eighty seats available in the audience, which congested the Court of Justice's website for an entire day. Suzane and Daniel Cravinhos were sentenced to 39 years and 6 months in prison; Cristian Cravinhos was sentenced to 38 years and 6 months.

== Von Richthofen family ==
The famous von Richthofen has many notable members. Among the family's relatives are: Ferdinand von Richthofen (geographer, 1833-1905); Oswald von Richthofen (diplomat, 1847-1906); Else von Richthofen (political scientist, 1874-1973); Frieda von Richthofen (philosopher, 1879-1956); Manfred von Richthofen (aviator, 1892-1918); Lothar von Richthofen (aviator, 1894-1922); Bolko von Richthofen (archaeologist, 1899-1983); Hermann von Richthofen (diplomat, 1933-2021).

Manfred Albert von Richthofen and Marísia met in the 1970s when she was studying medicine and he was studying engineering at the University of São Paulo (USP). After they married, they went to study in Germany. On their return, he began working for private companies until he joined Dersa, the state-owned company that manages roads in São Paulo. When she returned from Germany, Marísia opened a psychiatry practice. Suzane was born on November 3, 1983. Four years later, the youngest child, Andreas, was born.

In the neighborhood of the house where the family lived for almost fifteen years, in the South Zone of São Paulo, the four are remembered with sympathy. "It was the Doriana family, the happy family," says psychologist Luciane Mazzolenis, a neighbor of the couple, whom Suzane called her aunt. The von Richthofens moved out of the house - worth 400,000 reais - in 2000. But Manfred and his children often went to the house to collect mail and rake leaves from the yard. The family conflicts began when Suzane started her relationship with Daniel.

=== Manfred Albert von Richthofen ===
Manfred Albert von Richthofen (Erbach, February 3, 1953 - São Paulo, October 31, 2002) was a German-born Brazilian engineer, married to psychiatrist Marísia von Richthofen. Through his father, his branch would have lost most of its possessions and influence, mainly as a result of the fall of the German Empire in 1918, and his nation's major participation in World War I (1914-1918) and World War II (1939-1945). According to Manfred's marriage note published in a newspaper, his father was Joachim Hermann Oskar von Richthofen. In 1996, Manfred gave an interview to the now-defunct Jornal da Tarde, in which he claimed to be the great-nephew of the Red Baron. This interview was retrieved in October 2021 by a portal in the city of Santa Cruz do Sul, where Manfred's mother, who later moved to Germany, was born. Although Manfred's supposed kinship with Red Baron was widely reported in the Brazilian press, the German lineage of the aristocratic family denied any kinship.

According to a personal friend, Manfred was not an outspoken person, but he had a good sense of humor, was very intelligent and cared about his children's education. He had worked at Dersa since November 1998 and had been the company's Engineering Director since June 2002. As an employee of the company, he took part in the project to build São Paulo's Rodoanel Mário Covas, an expressway that bypasses the city, linking several highways. Manfred earned 11,000 reais a month at the state-owned company, but he had possessions because of his family. Marísia, who ran a psychiatric practice, earned around 20,000 reais from consultations. Manfred's fortune was valued at around 11 million reais at current prices.

In July 2006, the São Paulo State Public Prosecutor's Office reopened an investigation into the family's estate and Manfred's alleged illicit enrichment from work on the western stretch of the Rodoanel. The funds were to go into an account in Switzerland and be sent to Suzane. The case had been investigated for the first time in 2004 but was considered inconclusive. The new investigation was carried out under the secrecy of the courts and, in 2015, it was again closed due to lack of evidence.

=== Marísia von Richthofen ===
Marísia von Richthofen (born Marísia Abdalla, José Bonifácio, January 19, 1952 - São Paulo, October 31, 2002) was a Brazilian psychiatrist. She lived for fourteen years of her life in José Bonifácio, a town 40 kilometers from São José do Rio Preto. Marísia's grandfather, Miguel Abdalla, moved from Sorocaba to José Bonifácio in 1920 and was one of the pioneers in local commerce. With Miguel Abdalla, his children moved to Bonifácio, including Salim Abdalla, who married Lourdes Magnani in the city and had two children - Miguel Neto and Marísia. The psychiatrist studied in the town until 1966 and then moved to São Paulo with her grandparents. The news shocked her relatives in Sorocaba and José Bonifácio. The daughter of Italian and Lebanese descendants graduated from USP with her brother. She was considered the most outgoing and popular of the Richthofen family.

Suzane Louise Magnani Muniz
- Born: Suzane Louise von Richthofen; 3 November 1983 (age 43)
- Spouse: Sandrão (2014-2016) Felipe Muniz
- Children: 1
- Parent: Manfred Albert von Richthofen Marísia von Richthofen
- Criminal charges: Patricide & Matricide

=== Suzane von Richthofen ===
Suzane Louise Magnani Muniz (at the time of the crime Suzane Louise von Richthofen; São Paulo, November 3, 1983) is a Brazilian artisan, entrepreneur and criminal. She was born into a wealthy family in the city of São Paulo, the daughter of engineer Manfred Albert von Richthofen and psychiatrist Marísia von Richthofen, and the sister of Andreas Albert von Richthofen. Her father, born in Erbach, emigrated to Brazil after being offered a job due to his training as an engineer. Until the murders that culminated in her imprisonment, Suzane lived with her parents in a mansion in the Brooklin Velho neighborhood.

In October 2014, eleven years after her conviction, Suzane announced her marriage to another inmate named Sandra Regina Ruiz Gomes, sentenced to 27 years in prison for the kidnapping and death of a teenager in São Paulo. Known as "Sandrão", she was the ex-girlfriend of Elize Matsunaga, who was jailed for killing and dismembering her husband, Marcos Matsunaga, in 2012. In order to live with Sandra, Suzane had to sign an affectionate recognition document, required for all prisoners who decide to live together. With this document, she moved out of the evangelicals' wing, where she lived, and into the married prisoners' cell, where she shared space with eight other couples. People connected to Elize and Sandra said that the two had been together since the beginning of the year and that the relationship ended because of Suzane. The three worked in the prison's sewing workshop, where Suzane was the boss. The relationship was pointed out as one of the reasons why Suzane gave up the right to spend her days out of prison.

In February 2015, Suzane gave an interview with TV presenter Gugu Liberato in which she said she had planned the murder of her parents together with the Cravinhos brothers. She also claimed to regret the crime and confessed that she met Daniel, who would become her boyfriend, when she was 14, through her mother, and that with him she led a life "where she could do anything". She admitted to missing the presence of her parents, expressed her desire to be forgiven by her brother, Andreas, and confirmed her intention to give up her father's inheritance.

After the interview, "Sandrão" was released from prison and transferred to the Women's Resocialization Center in São José dos Campos, the same prison from which she was expelled in 2010 after assaulting a prison guard. With the move, their relationship ended and Suzane began dating a businessman from the transport sector.

In February 2017, she was pre-selected to get a loan, through the federal government's Higher Education Student Financing Fund (FIES), to attend a private college in Taubaté, near Tremembé, the city where she is serving a semi-open sentence in the women's prison. The course she chose was business administration, but Suzane needed permission from the Court of Criminal Executions to be able to go out at night. She got permission in 2016 but didn't continue with the course. In September 2021, the court authorized Suzane to leave prison every day, at a set time, to study pharmacy. On January 11, 2023, Suzane was released from prison after 20 years in jail, after which she moved to Angatuba, in the interior of São Paulo, and opened a studio. In March, Suzane began a relationship with doctor Felipe Zecchini Muniz and in September, biographer Ullisses Campbell also announced that she was also pregnant and living in Bragança Paulista, where she became a local icon. On December 13, Suzane and Felipe entered into a stable union contract and she changed her surname to "Magnani Muniz", being respectively the surname of her maternal grandmother and the other of her spouse. On January 27, 2024, Suzane gave birth to her first child, Felipe, at the hospital where her husband works, Albert Sabin, in Atibaia.

=== Andreas von Richthofen ===
Andreas Albert von Richthofen (São Paulo, July 3, 1987) was a quiet boy who was considered shy and had few friends. He spent most of his time locked in his room watching TV or on the computer. He was polite to the servants at the mansion, and waited for his father to arrive every day when he talked about his day. When the family went to the farm they owned in São Roque, Andreas and Manfred made carpentry objects and looked after the plants in the garden. The boy studied two languages and was a brown belt in karate. Andreas had a reserved temperament, like his father. He received around 2,000 reais a month in pocket money from his parents and, unlike Suzane, he kept most of the money.

Suzane and Andreas were very close to each other. According to reports, the two were always close, accomplices and confidants. "One always protected the other," said one of Suzane's childhood friends. "I never saw the two of them fight. They talked a lot and got on well," said former employee Silândia. The boy also liked to play in the yard with a shotgun and look after a guinea pig. Andreas studied with his sister at Colégio Humboldt until the end of 2001, when he went to Colégio Vértice by the decision of his parents since Suzane hadn't passed a USP entrance exam. At the time, Colégio Vértice was the number one school in terms of USP entrance exam passes.

After his first statement, on October 31, 2002, Andreas was taken away from his sister and moved in with his only maternal uncle, Miguel Abdalla. He met Suzane for the first time on November 13, at the re-enactment of the case at the family mansion. On November 14, he visited his sister at the 89th Police Station, in the Morumbi neighborhood, accompanied by her lawyer, Denivaldo Barni. On that occasion, Barni released a note supposedly written by the boy. At his sister's trial, Andreas claimed that he had been coerced into writing the note of forgiveness to his sister:

"To forgive is to open your heart. Not only have I forgiven my sister Su, but I still love her. Now, especially, is the time when she needs love the most. Despite the pain, I'm very sure that our parents have forgiven her. Just yesterday, I heard a phrase that struck me: humanity must walk together in search of the civilization of love."

After the alleged note was published, Andreas was " attacked" by the sensationalist media, but prosecutor Roberto Tardelli and the boy's uncle, Miguel, came out in his defense, claiming that the note was a "dirty trick" played by Suzane and her lawyer, Denivaldo. These criticisms caught the attention of the Center for Operational Support of Child and Adolescent Prosecutors, which sent a notification to Suzane's lawyer. Andreas visited Suzane for the last time on Christmas Eve 2002, in Carandiru, where he didn't go through the queue. According to the director of the Carandiru penitentiary, Andreas went directly inside because his presence in the waiting line could cause a disturbance. Andreas also obtained permission for an Audi A4 to pick him up inside the penitentiary, which caused outrage among relatives of inmates who had to stop their cars in the street. The warden said that the person who picked Andreas up was a lawyer, so he was allowed in with the car.

In 2004, he passed his exams at the top five universities in the state. In 2005, when Suzane was released, he went to see prosecutor Tardelli "fearing his death" after seeing Suzane hanging around the house where he lived with his uncle and maternal grandmother. Andreas learned that she had visited the house when his grandmother, Lourdes, was alone and had even taken photos with his grandmother. Andreas and his uncle Miguel did not forgive Suzane and did not agree to take her in at the time of her release. Her maternal grandmother, Lourdes, forgave her granddaughter, but declared that she "couldn't accept such an attitude and didn't want to share the same roof with her." Andreas never spoke about the crime to the press and hasn't visited Suzane since Christmas Eve 2002. During her time at liberty, Suzane stated that she called her brother once a week, but he usually didn't answer, and when he did, the conversation ended in an argument.

Andreas studied Pharmacy and Biochemistry at the University of São Paulo between 2005 and 2009. He started his doctorate in Organic Chemistry in 2010 at the same university and received a scholarship from CNPq. He lived in Vila Congonhas with his uncle Miguel and maternal grandmother Lourdes Magnani Silva Abdalla (who died in 2006) from November 2002 until mid-September 2011, when it was reported that he had moved to Zurich, Switzerland.

== Cravinhos family ==
The Cravinhos were considered the "loud family" by the neighborhood, as they repaired cars and motorcycles and tested model airplanes in the village. Married and living in the same village for decades, Nadja and Astrogildo Cravinhos had three children. Marco, who married and helped his parents financially. Cristian, the middle child, was seen as the problematic one. He argued with the residents and spent his days tinkering with motorcycles. He loved extreme sports, such as parachuting and motocross. Daniel, the youngest, was friendly and polite. From the age of 13, he dedicated himself to model airplanes. He was champion of São Paulo, Brazil, Pan America, and South America, and the fifth-best model airplane in the world in 1998 at a championship held in Kyiv, Ukraine. Colleagues at the airfield say that he was very skilled at building and painting the aircraft. He made his living making airplanes, earning around 1,400 reais per unit. He even studied law for six months at Universidade Paulista (UNIP) but dropped out because he didn't like it. In the 1970s, his father, Astrogildo, was convicted of ideological falsehood for using a fake Brazilian Bar Association card. He later studied law, but never practiced. He retired as a notary's clerk. The neighbors never heard any fights or arguments in the Cravinhos' house.

Cravinhos Brothers
- Born: Cristian Cravinhos de Paula e Silva Daniel Bento de Paula e Silva; São Paulo, Brazil
- Criminal charges: 38/39 years

Details
- Victims: Manfred and Marisia Von Richthofen

=== Cravinhos Brothers ===
Daniel Bento de Paula e Silva (at the time of the crime Daniel Cravinhos de Paula e Silva; São Paulo, January 26, 1981), is the murderer of Manfred. He was sentenced to 39 and a half years in prison. In February 2013, together with his brother, he obtained the right to a semi-open regime, in which he could go out during the day to work and return to prison to sleep. From 2014 to 2023, Daniel was married to biomedical doctor Alyne Bento. In 2018, Daniel moved to the open regime and started working on customizing motorcycles and helmets. In 2023, he started a relationship with hairdresser Andressa Rodrigues. After that, he moved to Campo Belo, São Paulo and has returned to practicing aeromodelling.

Cristian Cravinhos de Paula e Silva (São Paulo, November 21, 1975): perpetrator of Marísia's murder. He was a drug user at the time of the crime and had even been sent to a rehabilitation clinic. Cristian was the first to confess to the crime and, during the re-enactment, became emotional. Daniel and Cristian spent some time in the same prison, but even then, they weren't speaking to each other. The reason for the brothers' discord is their defense strategy.

Cristian was sentenced to 38 and a half years in prison. Like his brother, he was granted a semi-open regime in February 2013.

=== Astrogildo and Nadja de Paula e Silva ===
Astrogildo Cravinhos de Paula e Silva (São Paulo, 1945 - São Paulo, 2014) is the father of Daniel and Cristian and was a retired clerk. He gave several interviews and was criticized for trying to demoralize the Richthofen couple in various statements in order, according to prosecutor Roberto Tardelli, to find a justification for the crime. In 2010, Suzane alleged that Astrogildo was the mastermind of the crime.

Nadja Quissak Cravinhos de Paula e Silva (São Paulo, 1946) is the mother of Daniel and Cristian and was a painting teacher. She gave a single interview about the case to Crescer magazine in December 2002. "I forgive my children. If I didn't, I wouldn't be worthy of being a mother. But I think they do need punishment", she said in the interview.

== Suzane's relationship with the Cravinhos family ==
On a Sunday afternoon in August 1999, Manfred, Marísia, Suzane and Andreas went for a walk in Ibirapuera Park. They met Daniel, an aeromodelling competitor. Andreas became interested in the hobby and asked his parents to take a class. Daniel started giving Andreas aeromodelling lessons. Before long, the two became very close. Daniel took the boy biking and to autorama races. According to friends, Andreas even helped his sister get close to the boy. "Suzane thought Daniel was cute and sent him a note for Andreas," said a childhood friend of Suzane's in a statement. Manfred and Marísia didn't mind when Suzane began to have a more intimate relationship with Daniel, believing that it would only be temporary. Daniel and Andreas were very close.

Reports say that Andreas listened to his sister's secrets and participated in her life with her boyfriend. According to these reports, Andreas used to commit some delinquencies in the company of the couple. Hiding in the trunk of the car, Andreas told his interlocutors, he went to a hot-sheet hotel with his sister and brother-in-law, where they smoked cannabis. It was through the couple that Andreas tried marijuana for the first time in Villa-Lobos State Park. Daniel, according to what Andreas told the police investigating the case, was like an "older brother". "Cristian was also a dear friend", he said in his statements.

Over time, the relationship became more serious and Manfred and Marísia became worried. To earn a living, Daniel made one or two airplanes a month and sold them for around 1,400 reais. He also did maintenance and sold parts to enthusiasts. Suzane asked her father for money from her allowance to lend to her boyfriend and gave him lots of clothes and presents. His brother, Cristian, was hospitalized for cocaine addiction and lived in debt with drug dealers. He also worked as a police informer. The Richthofen couple felt that Daniel was not good for their daughter.

Friends of Suzane and Daniel say that the two changed after their teenage relationship became more serious. Suzane lost her virginity to Daniel at the age of 16 and at the same time they started smoking cannabis almost every day, and also experimented with ecstasy. The last trip Suzane took without her boyfriend was to the beach house of one of her best friends, in Porto Seguro, on New Year's Eve 2000. After that, it was hard to find her without Daniel. In order to be with her boyfriend, the girl stopped going to parties after her high school graduation, which made her parents very angry. At law school, the couple's contact was so close that they didn't even miss out on excursions. Daniel stayed by his girlfriend's side even during school activities. He accompanied Suzane and her class on a visit to the João Mendes Júnior Forum and Legislative Assembly of São Paulo (ALESP). "It seemed like their lives were all about each other. She only went for walks, went out at night or traveled with him," said Beatriz Chagas, Suzane's classmate at Pontifical Catholic University of São Paulo (PUC). Fellow aeromodellers say that Daniel has also changed: "Sometimes he would give up training to pick her up," says law student and aeromodeller Ênio Tosta. In his bedroom at his parents' house, Daniel has put up two panels with dozens of photos of him and Suzane. A caricature of the couple also shared space with the model airplane he used in competitions. On the bed, there was a pillow with a picture of Suzane next to his stuffed animals. From the beginning of their relationship, the couple used to go to the Disco Verde hot-sheet hotel by cab in the afternoons. But at the end of 2001, her parents began trying to convince Suzane to end the relationship, as they discovered Daniel's involvement with drugs and their daughter's "lack of motivation" to study. Suzane began spending the night with Daniel on the sly, telling her parents that she was going to stay at her friends' house to study. "She would warn us and we would cover up the lie," recalls one of her friends. One night in April 2002, the strategy went wrong. Marísia phoned Suzane's best friend and found out that her daughter hadn't gone to sleep. She demanded explanations the next morning when the girl returned home, and Suzane told her that she had spent the night in a hot-sheet hotel. Marísia and Manfred then decided to ban the relationship once and for all.

On Mother's Day 2002, Suzana and Manfred had an argument related to her relationship. Manfred slapped his daughter, who left the house saying she wouldn't come back. But she came back, promised her parents that the relationship was over and took her wedding ring off her finger. However, the relationship continued on as a secret.

With the prohibition, Suzane, who used to spend whole afternoons talking to her mother, became estranged from her parents. She fought with her family every time she came home with her boyfriend. 'In July, my parents went away for a month. That month was like a dream,' said Suzane. When they arrived, Suzane suggested that they would buy her an apartment or flat so that she could live with Daniel. Manfred refused, saying that his daughter should graduate, work, and then live with whoever she wanted. This refusal spurred on the planning of the murder.

At the beginning of September 2002, the 12th Battalion of the São Paulo Military Police was called to break up a fight in a house in the middle-class Campo Belo neighborhood. The officers arrived at the house at 2 am. They found Manfred at the gate wearing shorts, a shirt and slippers. Upset, Manfred was talking to Daniel, then 21. Suzane, then 19, tried to calm them down. Gradually, tempers cooled. But father and boyfriend came out of the argument with little threats: "One of these days I'm going to beat this kid up", Manfred told one of the police officers. A little less calm, Daniel said that the engineer had threatened to hit his daughter if they continued dating. "I feel like beating this old man", he said. It was the third time the police had intervened in a fight between the two, as in May and June, anonymous phone calls had already been made asking for help in similar situations. The reason was always the same: Suzane would come home late and try to go in with Daniel, her father would stop her and the arguments would start.

At Manfred and Marísia's funeral, the wedding ring was already back on Suzane's finger. The passion withstood the first few months in prison, but in March 2004 a letter from Daniel to Suzane gave the signal that the love was not the same: "I don't know why you don't talk to my parents or me anymore, could it be that you don't trust me anymore?".

== Murders ==
A few days before the murder, Suzane and the Cravinhos tested the noise caused by the firing of a firearm and discarded the idea of using one. On the afternoon of October 30, 2002, Suzane and Daniel Cravinhos went over the plans for the murder of the girl's parents for the last time. They talked to Cristian, who lived at his grandmother's house, who, still reluctant, was not sure whether he would take part in the events that would follow in the evening. Daniel asked his brother to think about it and, if he decided to help them, to wait for them in a certain street, near an internet café where they would take Andreas. That evening, Suzane's brother Andreas, who was fifteen at the time, was taken by the girl and her boyfriend to the café. He was seduced by the idea that on his sister's birthday the couple would celebrate in a hot-sheet hotel and he would celebrate in the café, and that Suzane would convince her parents to let her brother skip school the next day.

Cristian was already at the café. He arrived at the place at 10:12 pm and left at 10:50 pm, so that Andreas wouldn't see him. At around 11:20 pm, Suzane and Daniel met Cristian near the café. The three of them drove to the von Richthofen mansion in the student's Volkswagen Gol. Days before the night of the murder, Suzane had meticulously turned off the alarm and the surveillance cameras in the house, so that no images of the trio arriving would be captured. The three of them were then taken to the mansion.

Around midnight, they parked the car in the garage. According to the police, the hollow iron bars that were used in the murder were already in the car. The boys put on blouses and tights to prevent hair from falling through the house, material that could be used by the police to prove the murder. Suzane opened the gate, went upstairs and turned on the light in the hallway so that the brothers could see the couple's bedroom. Marísia and Manfred were asleep. The student separated garbage bags and surgical gloves, which were used by her mother, a psychiatrist.

The brothers, armed with iron bars, entered the couple's bedroom. Daniel went towards the engineer Manfred, while Cristian went towards Marísia. They were hit on the head. Manfred died on the spot. When Marísia was attacked, she woke up and tried to defend herself with her hands, resulting in three fractured fingers. Cristian told the police that he hit Marísia five times and put a towel over her mouth to stop her begging the alleged "murderers" not to attack her children, who she thought were asleep. Also according to Cristian's account, at a certain point, while she was in agony, Marísia began to make a sound "like snoring". To try to silence her, Cristian Cravinhos then took a towel from the couple's bathroom and pushed it down the psychiatrist's throat, which broke one of the bones in Marísia's neck. After confirming that they were both dead, Daniel placed a gun belonging to Manfred near his arm, next to the bed, and covered his face with a towel. Marísia's body was wrapped in a plastic garbage bag, which Suzane had left on the stairs for the brothers to deposit the iron bars and their clothes stained with their parents' blood.

"We got home, I went into my parents' bedroom. They were asleep. Then I went downstairs, turned on the light and told them they could go. I sat on the sofa with my hand to my ear. I didn't want my parents to die anymore. But then I realized that there was nothing else to do, that it was already too late", Suzane admitted in her statement after being arrested.

There is no information about Suzane's position in the house while the crime was taking place or whether she saw her parents' bodies afterwards. According to the re-enactment of the crime, she stayed on the first floor, where she took the opportunity to steal the cash in the house, stored in a leather briefcase with a code. Suzane opened the briefcase, since she knew the code, but Daniel then cut open the briefcase with a knife to fake the theft of 8,000 reais, 6,000 euros and 5,000 dollars. They also opened the couple's safe, which contained jewels and a revolver, located in the bedroom. The accused scattered the jewels on the floor and left the revolver, intact, next to the engineer's body. The bloodied bars were washed in the swimming pool and everything used in the crime was put into garbage bags, and the three even changed their clothes.

The stolen money and some jewelry were given to Cristian as payment for his participation. After the crime, he was left near the apartment where he lived with his grandmother, and the couple moved on to the third part of the plan: forging an alibi. Suzane and Daniel went to the Colonial motel on Ricardo Jafet Avenue, in the Ipiranga area, in the south. They stayed in the presidential suite, for which they paid around 300 reais, and ordered a Coca-Cola and a ham snack. Daniel curiously asked for an invoice, the first ever issued by the motel. The couple stayed there from 1:36 am to 2:56 am, according to the police.

After leaving the motel, the pair went to the internet café to pick up Andreas. They went to the student's boyfriend's house and told the teenager that he could ride on Daniel's scooter. Shortly afterwards, according to the original plan, the second stage of the simulation began. At around 4 am, Suzane and Andreas returned home. They arrived at the mansion, where Suzane said she was "surprised" that the doors were open. Andreas went into the library and called his parents, while Suzane, praying, ran into the kitchen, grabbed a knife and handed it to her brother, ordering him to wait outside the mansion. The student called her boyfriend and then, together with Andreas, made several phone calls to the house, waiting for her parents to answer.

At 4:09 am, Daniel contacted the police. He said he was in front of his girlfriend's house, who suspected a robbery was taking place there, and asked for a police car to come.

Alexandre Paulino Boto was the first police officer to arrive at the scene. In his testimony during the trial of the trio, he classified the murder as an "amateur crime". "The crime was an amateur procedure. They left the jewelry, cell phones and a gun in the couple's bedroom. If someone wanted to rob, steal, they wouldn't leave that there," the police officer said in 2006. "A thief wouldn't leave a gun on the floor." Boto said he was surprised by Suzane's behavior, who asked him what procedures the police would follow. "I was surprised by her question and her impassive attitude in the face of the death of her parents," he said. She then asked how her parents were. "When I said they were fine, she was astonished. 'How?' she asked." The policeman also found Daniel's questions strange, as he arrived at the scene shortly afterwards. "Do you know if anything was taken from the house? It seems that the family kept all the money in a little box." Daniel then told him the exact amounts of the money they kept.

While a policeman remained with Suzane and Andreas outside the mansion, Boto and another officer entered the house, carefully, as there was still the possibility of finding an alleged thief. Downstairs, the library was completely overturned, but the living room and kitchen were in order. A staircase led to the upper floor. The policemen went upstairs and found what looked like a girl's room, with the closet turned over and stuffed animals thrown on the floor. The next room was typically male, with a model airplane hanging from the ceiling, everything organized; 3 pillows covered by a sheet. The next room was a double room, a man lying dead on the bed next to a gun; the hypothesis of suicide was soon ruled out when Boto found a female body under the sheets.

Fearing the teenagers' reaction, the police called in a rescue vehicle. At that time of night, around 4:30 am, Daniel's family was already at the scene, hugging Suzane and Andreas. Boto asked Daniel to tell the couple's children that their parents had been murdered. Daniel hugged them both, they bowed their heads and whispered. Andreas moved away from the group, apparently in a state of shock. Suzane approached Boto and asked, "What do I do now?".

Around 5 am, Astrogildo Cravinhos spoke to reporters from various television networks while Suzane and Andreas were taken to the police station. The couple's behavior soon caught everyone's attention at the police station. While waiting to be seen, Suzane took a nap leaning on Daniel's shoulder. Andreas sat there, shrunken and visibly shaken, while his sister exchanged affectionate touches with her boyfriend. In between sentences, while they were making the police report, the couple exchanged kisses and cuddles. Suzane told the police chief, Dr. Enjolras Rello de Araújo, "I would like you to kill and torture these people that killed my parents" and smiled at Daniel.

== Investigations ==
For all those involved in the investigation into the murder of the Von Richthofen couple, from the outset the "robbery and murder" looked like a staging, so the work focused on the people closest to the house: the children, the maid, Manfred's colleagues at Dersa and Marísia's patients. The police investigated Suzane's relationship with Daniel Cravinhos. According to family friends, Manfred and Marísia did not approve of the relationship which, under pressure from her mother, was broken up once. On November 4, 2002, Suzane gave her second statement to police from the Homicide and Personal Protection Department (DHPP). The interrogation, to clear up any doubts about possible contradictions, lasted around two hours.

After suspecting that Cristian Cravinhos had bought a new motorcycle a few days after the murders, the police took him into custody while they questioned Daniel. On November 8, 2002, Cristian, Daniel and Suzane confessed to murdering the couple.

=== Suzane's interview with Fantástico ===
TV Globo's Sunday program Fantástico spent nine months talking to Denivaldo Barni, Suzane's lawyer-tutor, to get an exclusive interview. At that time, there was one telephone conversation and two meetings with Suzane off camera. At the beginning of April 2006, the lawyer confirmed that the interview would take place, asking that no archive footage be shown in the report. The recording was to take place in two stages: the first on April 5, 2006, in Barni's apartment in Morumbi.

On the afternoon of April 5, Fantástico met a 22-year-old Suzane who spoke and dressed like a child. Her T-shirt had a Minnie print on it. On her feet, bunny slippers. Her bangs covered her eyes at all times. She began the interview by showing photos of her friends and family. It was clear throughout the interview that, when asked how she felt about her ex-boyfriend, Suzana looked at Barni: "A lot of hatred. A lot, a lot, a lot. Too much. He destroyed my family, he destroyed everything, everything, everything I held most dear he took from me. The most precious thing I had..." Right at the start of the recording, the camera recorded a conversation between Barni and Suzane. The microphone, already switched on, picked up the conversation. He told Suzane to cry during the interview.

The interview aired on April 9, 2006. The television program exploited the idea that Suzane's interview was a farce by her defense to make her appear to the public in a different light: as a sweet girl (wearing slippers), immature, childish and highly influential, which would have motivated her to do what she did. Based on the idea that Suzane's release could influence or even hinder the trial, she was arrested again the day after the interview was aired.

On the other side, Barni claimed that he asked his client to cry so that she could make her brother feel better. According to Barni, Suzane was fighting to receive her parents' inheritance, but her brother was opposed to this and had taken Suzane to court in an "Action for Exclusion" as an heir - made possible by Brazilian law against those who have made an attempt on the lives of potential legatees.

== Judgement ==
The trial of the three defendants was scheduled for June 5, 2006 at the 1st Jury Court of São Paulo. Suzane arrived at the courthouse at around 11:30 am. The Cravinhos brothers arrived an hour earlier. The trial was scheduled to begin at 1 pm.

The lawyers for the Cravinhos brothers, Geraldo and Divaine Jabur - claiming that they were unable to meet with their clients to better prepare their defense - did not appear before the jury, with the result that the brothers' trial was canceled. Subsequently, after Suzane's lawyers withdrew from the courtroom - following an argument with the judge over the fact that an essential witness had not shown up - her jury was also postponed.

In order to avoid another delay, the judge in the case took some precautions, such as authorizing a meeting between the Cravinhos brothers and one of their lawyers at the end of June 2006, and appointing a public defender (and even a substitute for the latter) to defend the brothers if their lawyers were absent again. Possible maneuvers by Suzane's defense were not expected, since she no longer had the benefit of house arrest. A new trial was scheduled for Monday, July 17, 2006. The sentence was passed in the early hours of Saturday, July 22, at 2 am.

=== Day one ===
On the first day of the trial (July 17, 2006), controversy and new versions of the facts emerged. The three accused took the stand. In her testimony, Suzane said that she had no knowledge of the plan to kill her parents, conceived and carried out solely by the Cravinhos brothers. She also said that she was "very high" when the crime took place, that she took the brothers to the house without knowing that her parents were going to be murdered, and that she only realized what had happened when she got home with her brother Andreas. She also claimed that Daniel was excessively jealous. He mentioned a time when she went on a trip to Germany and was forced to spend a lot on phone cards just to keep in touch with her boyfriend. When Suzane returned, Daniel told her that he couldn't stay away from her for so long and that he had tried to kill himself because of his girlfriend's absence. Suzane said that she had given Daniel expensive presents with her parents' money. According to Suzane, she gave Daniel DVDs, TVs and expensive goods. "He always had money in his wallet. But it was always my money," said the daughter of the murder victims. Suzane also stated that at the model airplane club where she and her brother Andreas met Daniel, she became known as "the golden goose of the Cravinhos family."

Another point of conflict was the loss of her virginity: while she claimed to have lost it with Daniel Cravinhos, Daniel said she lost it with her previous boyfriend. According to the Folha de S.Paulo newspaper, this discussion is relevant because it could undermine the main thesis of Suzane's defense, that Daniel exerted an irresistible fascination over her.

Cristian, for his part, also provided new information: according to him, only his brother Daniel had killed Manfred and Marísia. Cristian assumed this responsibility because he thought that Daniel would spend less time in prison. The defendant also insisted that Daniel and Suzane were convinced to commit the crime, despite his attempts to discourage them; according to him, Suzane would have said: "I want to kill my parents today". According to the prosecution, Cristian could lose the benefit of a reduced sentence for changing his version of events. Daniel said, among other things, that the mastermind of the crime was Suzane von Richthofen. According to him, the bad relationship between his ex-girlfriend and her parents was common knowledge. Daniel maintained that Suzane suffered physical and verbal abuse, as well as sexual abuse (a fact that Suzane denied: she classified her family as "normal, good"). Because of this and her inheritance, Daniel claimed that Suzane was convinced to kill her parents. He also claimed to have been "used" by his ex-girlfriend to carry out her plan.

The defense of the Cravinhos brothers accused Suzane of being a "liar" and asked for a face-to-face meeting between the three defendants, a request accepted by Judge Alberto Anderson Filho. This meeting could clarify crucial points, such as who was the mastermind and what Suzane's real role in the crime was - there was controversy, for example, as to whether or not she saw her parents' bodies. The Cravinhos brothers have been accused of "lying".

=== Day two ===
The main part of the second day of the trial (July 18, 2006) was the testimony of Andreas, Suzane's brother. The first person to be heard, Andreas Albert von Richthofen, stated that neither he nor his sister were victims of abuse or mistreatment by their parents, contrary to what Daniel Cravinhos said. The boy classified Suzane's relationship with Manfred and Marísia as normal, with no exceptional conflicts. He said that he was "emotionally blackmailed" into writing a note saying that he forgave his sister, but that in fact he didn't forgive her; he also said that he didn't believe in his repentance or his intention to give up his inheritance, and said that he and Suzane were influenced by Daniel Cravinhos to use cannabis. Andreas also admitted to feeling threatened by his sister: "They say she's a psychopath. I don't know, but you can expect anything from a person like that". Andreas also revealed that he can't use the money because Suzane is complicating the process. Another of Suzane's lies was about the weapon used in the crime. In her statement, she said that the gun belonged to her brother, which Andreas denied. He only said that Suzane had asked him to throw it away.

At the request of the Public Prosecutor's Office, police chief Cíntia Tucunduva Gomes was also heard. She dismantled the version presented the previous day by the Cravinhos brothers that only Daniel had struck the victims: for her, the attacks were simultaneous, as it would have been impossible for one of the two to have been attacked without the other showing any reaction. Gomes also emphasized Suzane's coldness, who behaved dispassionately from the start - after confessing to the crime, Suzane allegedly combed her hair and asked her then-boyfriend if she looked pretty, before being photographed and registered with the DHPP (Homicide and Protection of Persons Department).

The witnesses also included: Fábio de Oliveira (a prison guard) and Hélio Artesi (the father of Cristian's ex-girlfriend), who attested to the good behavior of the Cravinhos brothers; Ivone Wagner, who testified that Suzane treated her mother badly; and military policeman Alexandre Boto, who "found it strange" that Suzane arrived at the von Richthofen's house to see what had happened.

=== Day three ===
On the third day of the trial (July 19, 2006), Suzane's lawyers tried to maneuver to include new documents in the case file. The mother of defendants Cristian and Daniel Cravinhos, Nadja Cravinhos de Paula, gave an emotional testimony. She stressed the regret and deep shame that her sons would be feeling, although she asked the jurors to punish everyone: "Everyone has to pay for what they did, and not for what they didn't do." She said that she had forgiven everyone, that Suzane's parents were aggressive when they drank and in fact sexually abused the girl, that Andreas was influenced too much by Suzane, and that Cristian no longer had a problem with drugs, having quit ten years earlier.

Reinforcing the line of defense set up by the children's lawyer, Nadja stated that Suzane did not lose her virginity to Daniel and that Manfred and Marísia drank a lot and "were extremely aggressive" with each other and with the children. Nadja said that when Suzane had to go to the farm with her parents, she panicked. "I don't know if she played the victim, making him (Daniel) an instrument," said the Cravinhos' mother. Cristian and Daniel cried a lot during their testimony.

Hours later, Cristian - believed to have been influenced by his mother's testimony - changed his own statement, confessing to having beaten Marísia von Richthofen to death. He attributed the conception of the plan to Suzane: she had convinced them to take part in the crime by claiming that, with her parents, she "had no life", and that Manfred had tried to rape her when she was 13. However, she maintained that she slammed the car door and stomped harder in an attempt to wake the couple up and give them a chance to react. He also said that Suzane had calmed him down when Manfred and Marísia were killed, saying: "You didn't take anything from me. You gave me a new life". At the end of his testimony, Cristian was crying a lot and was hugged by his father. The trial was suspended for a few minutes and the jurors were removed from the courtroom.

Fernanda Kitahara, Suzane's former college classmate, also testified. She confirmed that Suzane and Andreas used marijuana, and that the drugs were bought by Daniel. She said that she knew of disagreements between Suzane and her parents, emphasizing their controlling nature: "She had a schedule for coming home, going out with me or with her boyfriend" - with this, Suzane would have lied to her parents several times in order to meet Daniel. He also said that Suzane was quiet and friendless in class, thanks to Daniel's exacerbated jealousy, and said that Suzane told him that her boyfriend was persecuted by the spirit of a friend, "Nego" or "Negão". He said that the accused would have to choose between her parents and her boyfriend.

=== Day four ===
The fourth day of the trial (July 20, 2006) began with the showing of the forensic images taken of Marísia's body. Expert Jane Belucci used photographs to clarify the dynamics of the events, and the nature of the photos, such as the one of Manfred's disfigured face, caused general discomfort. The Forensic Medical Institute (IML) report concluded that the defendant's mother died from traumatic brain injury, caused by a "blunt instrument" with several blows. According to the analysis, Suzane's mother died an agonal death, remaining alive for some time. While these images were being shown, the defendants Suzane, Daniel and Cristian remained with their backs to the screen, without at any time looking at any photos.

The day was also reserved for the reading of witness statements (still in the procedural phase of the case) and for the showing of the film re-enactment and a series of reports about the crime, as well as the testimony of the accused. Daniel and Cristian cried copiously during the showing of their reenactments, and asked to be removed from the plenary. Suzane was not seen crying, despite her lawyers' statements to the contrary, and also left the plenary - for prosecutor Roberto Tardelli, however, regret and despair do not reduce the sentence. The defendants disagreed on who was responsible for messing up the house's library during the simulated robbery, and on the moment when they picked up a bottle of water to throw at the victims' heads.

Love letters exchanged by Suzane and Daniel were also read out. While the young man was moved to the point of being removed from the plenary, Suzane showed embarrassment and discomfort (especially in the passages in which she calls Daniel "my little husband" and other similar nicknames, which drew laughter from the audience), keeping her chair away from the brothers. For prosecutor Tardelli, the defendants' behavior highlights Suzane's "coldness" and Daniel's "lack of emotional control". The prosecution said it would try to prove that the crime was entirely planned, that none of the defendants were induced. To this end, they intend to recall, among other things, that immediately after the crime, Daniel and Suzane were engaged in love scenes at the police station, while Cristian went to a barbecue, traveled and bought a motorcycle.

=== Day five ===
On the last day of the trial (July 21, 2006), the debates between the prosecution and the defense were held and, after the decision by the Public Prosecutor's Office to waive the time set aside for rebuttal, the jurors met to decide the future of the defendants. The lawyer, Gislaine Jabur, tried to convince the jurors to overturn the qualifiers put forward by the prosecution against Cristian and Daniel: she argued that Cristian could not be charged with a double homicide, since he only killed Marísia; she said that there was no ulterior motive, since he had no grudge against the victims; finally, she argued that there was no cruel motive (the report from the IML states that Marísia died from head trauma, and not from the towel placed in her mouth). As for Daniel, Gislaine recalled that, since the re-enactment of the crime, the defendant claimed to have tried to wake Manfred after striking him, shaking his arm and passing a towel over his face. The lawyers also argued that the accusations of fraud and theft were unfounded, since Cristian would have kept the money and jewelry at Suzane's request.

Prosecutors Roberto Tardelli and Nadir de Campos Júnior asked the jury to convict the defendants. The prosecution accused Suzane's defense of social prejudice when it claimed that the "millionaire girl", who lived oblivious to reality in a world of material comfort, and who had no reason to commit a crime, was easily convinced by Daniel to do so, since he, coming from a humbler family and having a history of crime and drug use, was more likely to commit a crime.

When he was accused by prosecutor Nadir de Campos Júnior, Daniel Cravinhos had a crying fit and was hugged by his brother Cristian. Both were removed from the plenary. Suzane, for her part, remained in plenary with her head down, without showing any reaction.

The four men and three women who were part of the jury met at around 10 pm at the Barra Funda courthouse (west of São Paulo). They answered a questionnaire in which they judged whether each of the defendants was guilty on 12 items. The possible answers were yes and no. In the case of the Cravinhos brothers, the questions were, among others, whether there was a foul motive, whether the means used were cruel, whether the victims were able to defend themselves, and whether there were any extenuating circumstances. In Suzane's case, the jurors had to decide on six questions whether or not she had acted under duress from the Cravinhos brothers. Based on the questionnaires, Judge Alberto Anderson Filho, president of the 1st Jury Court, established and released the sentence.

== Sentencing ==
The jury sentenced Suzane Richthofen and Daniel Cravinhos to 39 years in prison, plus six months' detention, for the murder of engineer Manfred and psychiatrist Marísia von Richthofen, who were beaten to death on October 31, 2002, at their home in the upscale neighborhood of Brooklin, in São Paulo. The base sentence was 16 years, plus 4 years for the aggravating factors, for each of the murders. Both had their sentences reduced by one year; Suzane because she was under 21 at the time, and Daniel, thanks to his confession. Cristian Cravinhos was sentenced to 38 years in prison, plus six months' detention. His base sentence was 15 years, plus four years for the aggravating factors, also for each of the murders. He also had his sentence reduced by one year for having confessed to the crime. Even though they were sentenced to almost 40 years, Brazilian law only allows a convict to be imprisoned for a maximum of 30 years.

The sentence was only announced at 3 am on July 22, 2006, by Judge Alberto Anderson Filho, who presided over the trial that began earlier in the week, on the 17th, at the Barra Funda Criminal Forum, in São Paulo. The convicts could still appeal, but could not go free. Nor could they be submitted to a new jury, as the sentences were less than 20 years for each murder committed. Suzane Richthofen's defense lawyer, Mauro Otávio Nacif, said that he left the court "very sad" and that he would not appeal the result, but would try to reduce his client's sentence.

== Arrest of convicts ==
On the night of November 20, 2002, Suzane was transferred to the Carandiru Women's Penitentiary. Daniel was taken to Belém 1 and Cristian to Belém 2. Suzane was left alone in a cell with a bed, television, shower and toilet. She was also visited by her lawyer Claudia Bernasconi and two other civil defenders. Suzane also asked to be able to visit her 15-year-old brother Andreas and her maternal grandmother.

In December 2004, Suzane was denied a writ of habeas corpus. In June 2005, it was accepted, and Suzane was released at the end of the month. However, one day after the controversial interview with Fantástico on a Sunday in April 2006, Suzane was arrested again (April 12). The request for her arrest was made to the courts by the prosecutor in the case, Roberto Tardelli, the day after the interviews she gave to Veja magazine and Fantástico were broadcast. The report aired by Globo on Sunday night sought to show what would be a "farce" put together by Suzane's defense. The channel showed excerpts from recordings in which the lawyers instructed her to cry. In the request, the prosecutor presented a photo of Suzane next to her maternal grandmother. In ordering the arrest, the judge understood that Suzane's brother, Andreas, was "within her reach" and that "the differences between Suzane and her brother have become public, sometimes because of disagreements over the division of the assets of their deceased parents, the victims".

In February 2013, Daniel and Cristian received the right to a semi-open regime, in which they could leave during the day to work and return to prison to sleep. On May 10, 2013, they left prison for the first time since 2006, after the quarantine period of the semi-open regime decision, for the benefit of Mother's Day.

In August 2014, Suzane benefited from the progression of her sentence from the closed regime to the semi-open regime, with the right to work during the day and sleep in prison. According to Judge Sueli de Oliveira Armani, of Taubaté's 1st Penal Execution Court, the defendant "has been in prison for 12 years, has no record of disciplinary infractions or any other factor detracting from her prison record, (...) there is no way to deny the applicant progression to the intermediate regime". According to her lawyer, Denivaldo Barni, Suzane should be working as an assistant in his office.

A little less than a week after the court's decision, Suzane filed a request to remain in a closed regime in the Tremembé Penitentiary, where she was serving her sentence, claiming that she feared being harassed in another prison - a fact that had already happened when she was imprisoned in Carandiru. She also claimed that she needed the salary she received for her work in the FUNAP clothing workshop in Tremembé prison, where she had a good relationship with the other inmates.

In October 2015, Suzane, then imprisoned for eight years, won the right to move to the semi-open regime, as she had already served more than a third of her 39-year sentence and had shown good behavior. With the decision of the São Paulo Court of Justice, the convict can work outside the penitentiary during business hours and sleeps in jail. Suzane has also been granted temporary leave on holidays such as Christmas. Despite the new regime, Suzane has not changed her address, as her defense requested that she remain in Tremembé.

In May 2016, Suzane was confined to a solitary cell in Tremembé Prison, where she is serving her sentence, due to the fact that she had provided the wrong address when she was allowed to spend Mother's Day out of prison. According to a report in the TV program Fantástico, Suzane was located in the city of Angatuba, in the interior of São Paulo, at an address that did not correspond to the one provided to the Secretariat of Penitentiary Administration. According to Suzane's defense, it was all just a misunderstanding, as the address where she was arrested was only three kilometers away from the one provided, in the same city. Suzane was taken back to prison, where she was placed under an "observation regime" for ten days, until the infraction was investigated. For "having committed a serious infraction", the São Paulo courts suspended the semi-open regime, and Suzane returned to the closed regime. According to the police investigation, Suzane was found in Diogos Neighborhood, on the property of her new boyfriend's sister, who owns the pharmacy located at the address she provided when she was released from prison. Suzane's new boyfriend, Rogério Olberg, known as "Alemão", is said to be a businessman, whose activities are unknown, and whom Suzane met in Tremembé prison, when he was visiting a sister who was imprisoned there. Since the transfer of Sandra Regina Ruiz Gomes, known as "Sandrão", with whom Suzane shared a cell for couples, to the semi-open regime in São José dos Campos, the two women have been separated.

In January 2023, the São Paulo Court of Justice reported that Suzane had received the benefit of the open regime, granted by the 2nd Court of Penal Executions of Taubaté, having fulfilled the requirements of the Penal Executions Law. Suzane had already reduced her sentence from 39 years to 34 years and four months, due to the work she had done in prison. Suzane's defense had been trying to get her sentence extended since 2017. The Public Prosecutor's Office has announced that it will appeal the decision, requesting that new psychological assessments be carried out.

== Impact ==
=== Political impact ===
After the von Richthofen case came to light, federal deputy Paulo Baltazar (PSB-RJ) drafted a bill that prevents those convicted of crimes against family members from having access to the victim(s)' estate. The bill was approved by the Chamber's Constitution and Justice Committee (CCJ) in April 2006, and is awaiting approval in the Senate. On the same occasion, Bill 141/2003, by the same author, which was being processed jointly, was also approved. It excludes from inheritance anyone who kills or attempts to kill their spouse, partner, ascendant or descendant.

=== Dispute over the von Richthofen inheritance ===
The von Richthofen inheritance is valued at more than 11 million reais. When Suzane turned 18 in November 2001, her father allegedly opened a 30 million euro account in Switzerland in her name. Controversies state that the money is the result of corruption at DERSA, the company where Manfred was the engineer responsible for building the western section of the billion-dollar Mário Covas Ring Road. As the account is in his name, nothing would prevent Suzane from having access to the money after serving her sentence.

Andreas von Richthofen, Suzane's brother, has remained silent since the trial of the case, but decided to speak out in March 2015 to refute the accusations against his father. According to allegations made by prosecutor Nadir de Campos Júnior, Manfred kept accounts abroad in Suzane's name with money that had allegedly been embezzled from the state-owned company where he worked. In his letter to Campos Júnior, Andreas said: "If there are accounts abroad, you should present the evidence, show what they are and where they are, because I also want to know and I understand that your position and prestige fully enable you to do so. But if this is nothing more than malicious rumors and there is no proof, then you should retract and keep quiet about it, so as not to allow the baseness and cruelty of this crime to wrongly tarnish the reputation of people who are no longer here to defend themselves, my parents Manfred Albert and Marísia von Richthofen." Referring to the prosecutor, Andreas also said that he understood "the anger and indignation against the three killers". "Much of society shares this feeling. So do I. It's disgusting," he said of the crime.

As for the von Richthofen estate, on February 8, 2011, the court ruled that the young woman was unworthy to receive the inheritance, as she had been convicted of murder. The inventory and sharing process had been under review by the court since December 2002, two months after the crime. Suzane also tried to get alimony from her parents' estate, but her request was denied by the courts.

In October 2014, Suzane went to court to give up her entire inheritance to her brother, Andreas, and expressed her desire to meet him again. The two have not seen each other since the trial in 2006. In the same document, she dismissed her lawyer Denivaldo Berni, who had accompanied her all these years, claiming she felt insecure about his performance "both in the judicial and personal aspects". She also asked that he be banned from visiting her. Among the assets of the inheritance is the von Richthofen family home, valued at around 3 million reais.

In March 2015, the São Paulo court ruled that the family inheritance should go only to Andreas, Suzane's brother. In the ruling, the judge determined that she should be excluded from the inheritance because he considered her "unworthy".

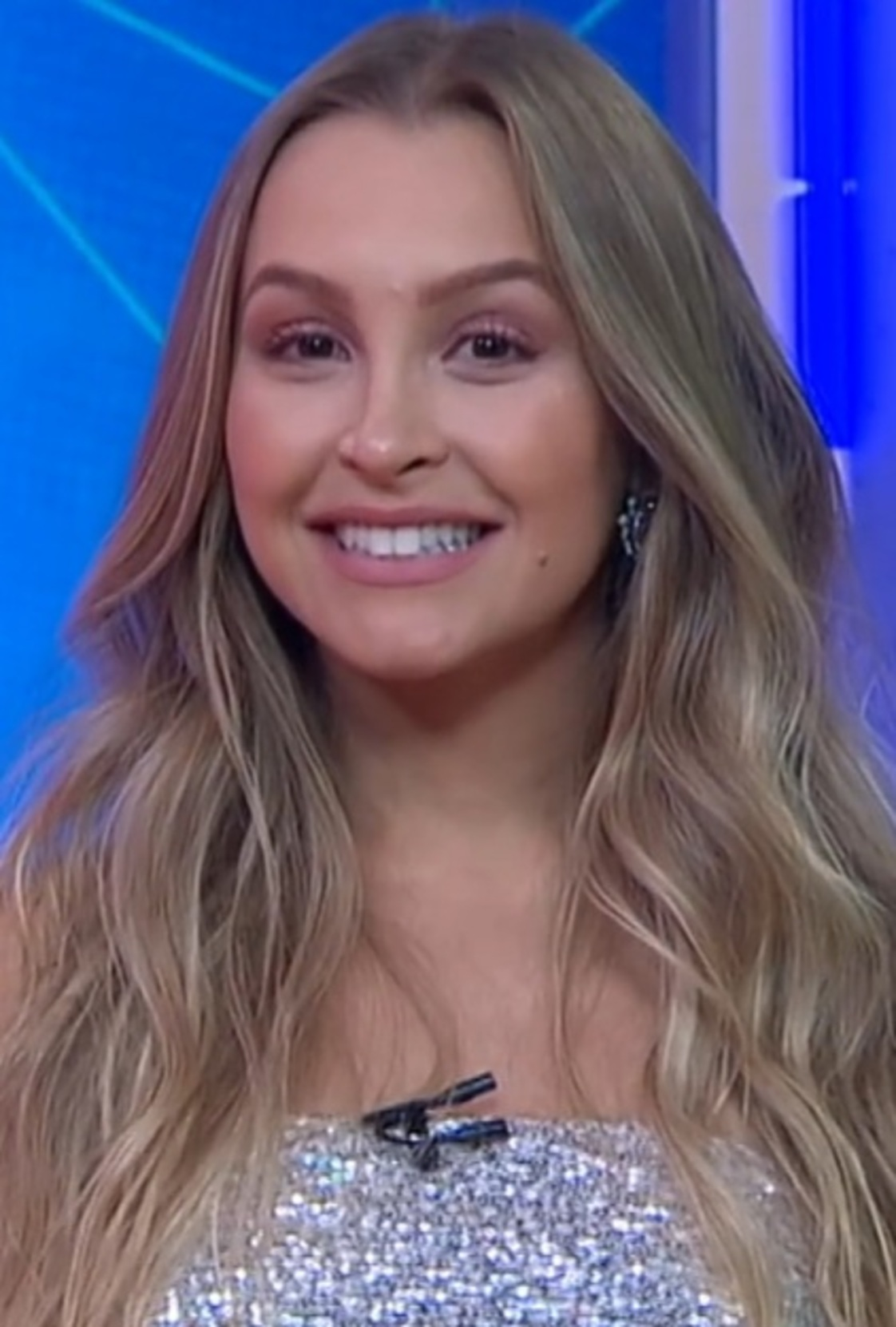
Actress Carla Diaz played Suzane in the films The Girl Who Killed Her Parents and The Boy Who Killed My Parents.

=== Von Richthofen case in pop culture ===
The case was listed by the Brasil Online (BOL) portal as "22 crimes that shocked Brazil" and by Folha de S.Paulo in 2018 as "crimes in families that shocked the country". The book The Fifth Commandment, written by Ilana Casoy and published in 2009, retraces the steps taken by the young men that night.

The book The Fifth Commandment (Brazil: Quinto Mandamento), written by criminologist Ilana Casoy and released in 2009, reconstructs the crime from the beginning, recreating the young men's steps that night. The author also looks at Suzane's behavior, the family members' testimonies and the police's investigative work in search of evidence.

Written by former Civil Police investigator Roger Franchini, the book Richthofen: The Murder of Suzane's Parents (Brazil: Richthofen: Assassinato dos pais de Suzane), released in 2011, looks at the case of parricide and matricide through the eyes of investigative journalism. The book takes a behind-the-scenes look at the investigation, from the moment the double homicide took place and appeared to be just another case of robbery until it developed into a complex case and began to involve people close to the victims. The writer reveals how the evidence and clues led to the upper-middle-class girl and shows how, together with her boyfriend and his brother, she became a confessed defendant of having planned and carried out the murder of her parents. The title also includes excerpts from the statements given to the authorities by the accused.

Journalist Ullisses Campbell wrote the book Suzane - Crime and Punishment (Brazil: Suzane - Crime e Castigo), the title of which was later changed to Suzane, Murderer and Manipulator (Brazil: Suzane, Assassina e Manipuladora) and which was due to be released in 2020. However, in October 2019, Suzane's defense obtained a court injunction seeking to prevent the book's publication. The book tells Suzane's story from the moment she meets Daniel Cravinhos, who would become her boyfriend. The injunction was rejected by the São Paulo State Court of Justice, on the grounds that, based on a ruling by the Supreme Federal Court, unauthorized biographies can be published, regardless of the biographer's wishes, "under penalty of affronting freedom of expression and constituting censorship". The defense appealed, taking the appropriate legal measures.

In 2021, two films based on the case were released: The Girl Who Killed Her Parents and The Boy Who Killed My Parents, both directed by Maurício Eça. The stories are based on the testimonies of the accused during the trial, which presented the conflicting versions of Daniel Cravinhos and Suzane von Richthofen, respectively, each accusing the other of being the mastermind of the crime. In the works, Suzane is played by Carla Diaz and Daniel by Leonardo Bittencourt.

The film is based on the testimony of the accused during the trial, which presented the conflicting versions of Daniel Cravinhos and Suzane von Richthofen, respectively, each accusing the other of being the mastermind of the crime.

== See also ==
- Suzane von Richthofen
- Crime in Brazil
- Celso Daniel Case

== Bibliography ==
- Casoy, Ilana (2011-04-26). O Quinto Mandamento (in Portuguese). Ediouro. ISBN 978-8575812280. Archived from the original on 2011-04-26.
- Franchini, Roger (2011). Richthofen - o assassinato dos pais de Suzane. Planeta. ISBN 9788576657446.
- Campbell, Ulysses (2020). Suzane - assassina e manipuladora. Matrix. ISBN 9788582306178.
