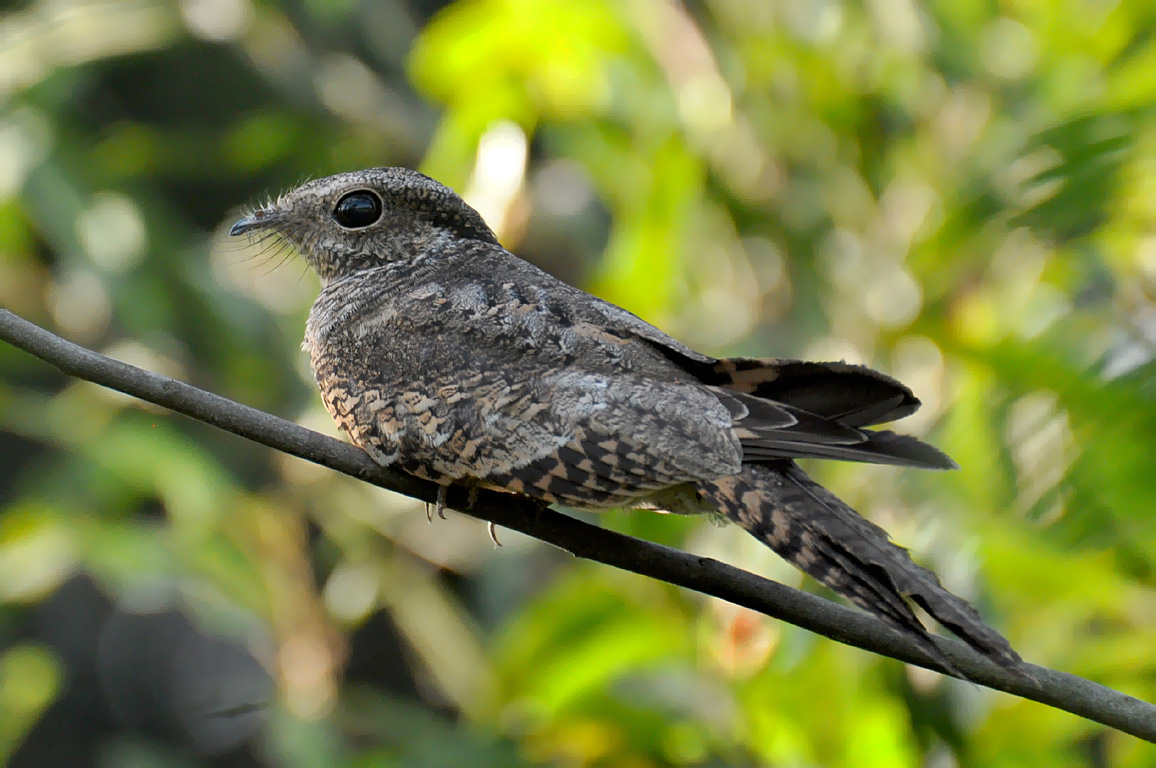

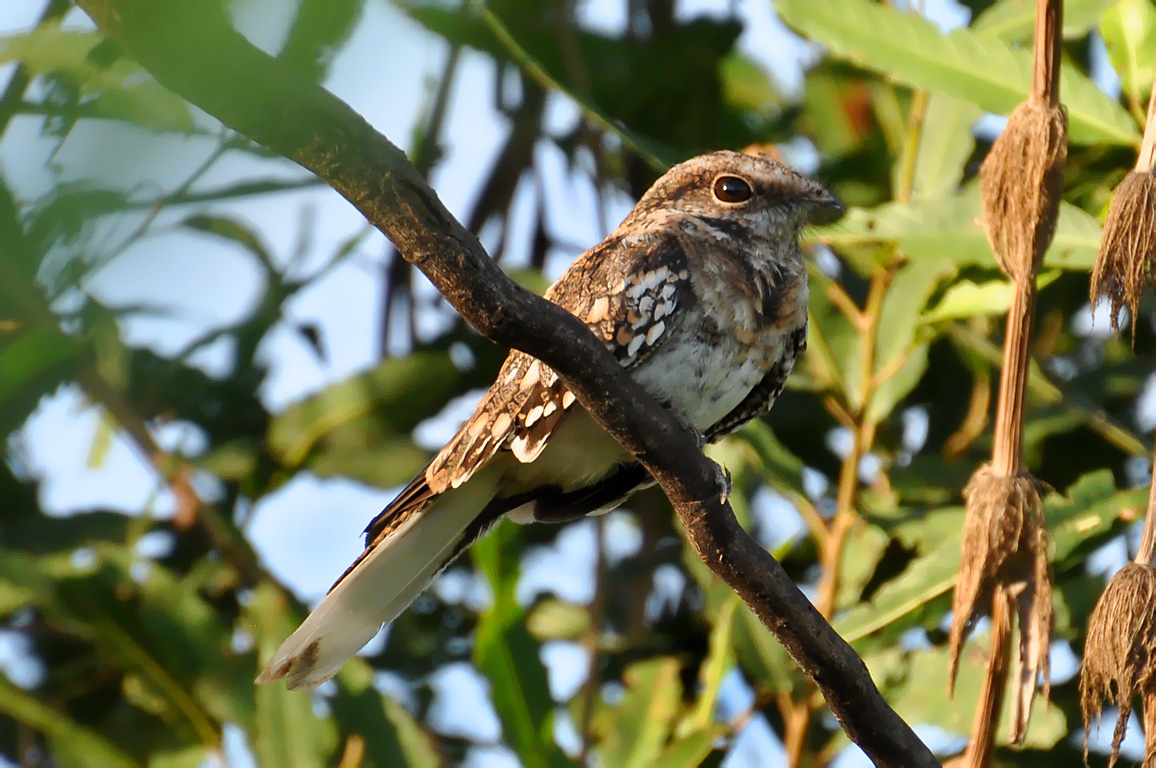
- Top, female; bottom, male

Conservation status
- Least Concern (IUCN 3.1)

Scientific classification
- Kingdom: Animalia
- Phylum: Chordata
- Class: Aves
- Order: Caprimulgiformes
- Family: Caprimulgidae
- Genus: Hydropsalis
- Species: H. climacocerca

Binomial name
- Hydropsalis climacocerca (Tschudi, 1844)

= Ladder-tailed nightjar =

Species of bird

The ladder-tailed nightjar (Hydropsalis climacocerca) is a species of bird in the nightjar family Caprimulgidae. It is one of four species in the genus, Hydropsalis. It is found in the Amazon Basin of Brazil, the Guianas, Suriname, and also Amazonian Colombia, Ecuador, Peru and Bolivia; it is also in Venezuela. Its natural habitats are subtropical or tropical moist shrubland, rivers, and freshwater lakes.

This bird is highly camouflaged and has the colors of 'ground cover', as do most of the nightjars. The colors are broken with white patches, grays, both dark, and light, and some brown, especially around the neck and head. Many of the nightjar species also have the distraction display, which helps lead unwary predators farther distances from the nest, young, or eggs.

As a species that hunts airborne insects at night, it has large eyes and a large wide gape to allow this feeding strategy.

== Taxonomy ==
The ladder-tailed nightjar was formally described in 1844 by the Swiss naturalist Johann Jakob von Tschudi under the binomial name Caprimulgus climacocercus based on a specimen collected in Peru. The specific epithet combines the Ancient Greek κλιμαξ/klimax, κλιμακος/klimakos meaning "ladder" with κερκος/kerkos meaning "tail". The ladder-tailed nightjar is now one of four species placed in the genus Hydropsalis that was introduced in 1832 by the German naturalist Johann Georg Wagler.

Five subspecies are recognised:

- H. c. schomburgki Sclater, PL, 1866 – east Venezuela and the Guianas
- H. c. climacocerca (Tschudi, 1844) – west Amazonia
- H. c. pallidior Todd, 1937 – Santarém, west Pará (central north Brazil)
- H. c. intercedens Todd, 1937 – Obidos, west Pará (central Brazil)
- H. c. canescens Griscom & Greenway, 1937 – lower Rio Tapajós, west Pará (central north Brazil)

== Distribution ==
The ladder-tailed nightjar is found in all regions of the Amazon basin, and in the northeast the Guiana Shield and the Guianan countries; its range does not extend east of the Amazon River outlet, (the island: Ilha de Marajo). At this same outlet, in the region of the Xingu River confluence, the range extends southward and is in the lower two-thirds of the drainage of this north-flowing river.

In the west the species range is adjacent to the Andes foothills. In the north, the range extends into southeastern Venezuela, and only the upper third of the Caribbean north-flowing Orinoco River drainage, the area of the eastern Orinoco River Basin and uplands bordering western Guyana.

In the very headwaters of the southern Amazon Basin, the upstream half of the river drainages, both in the southeast and southwest, the range overlaps with its sister Hydropsalis species, the scissor-tailed nightjar, which ranges into southeast Brazil through the caatinga, cerrado, and pantanal south into Argentina. The two species cover all of South America east of the Andes cordillera from central Argentina to the Caribbean coast; the exception is a small region centered southeast of the Amazon basin in the vicinity of Maranhão, Brazil.

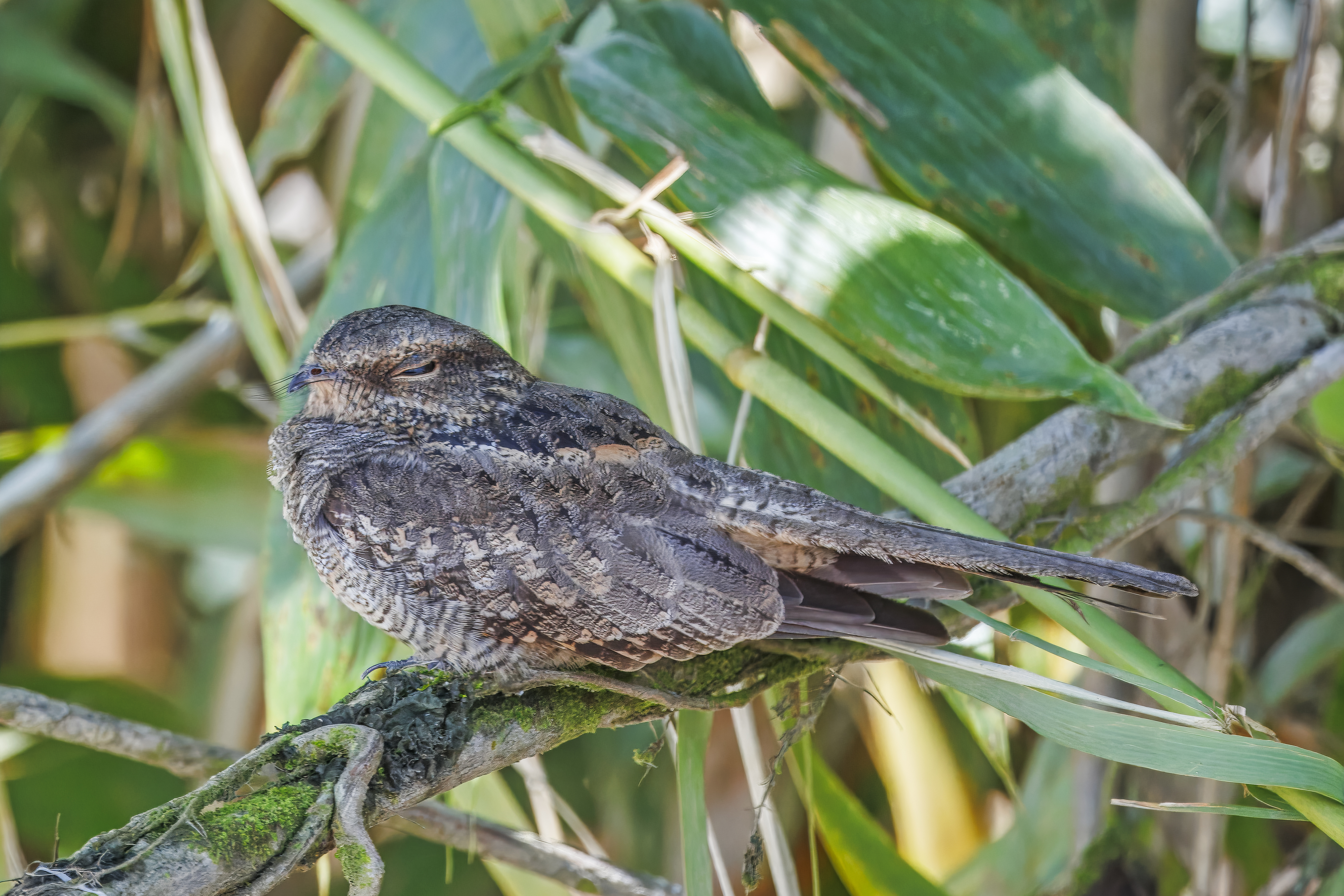
in the Amazon, Ecuador

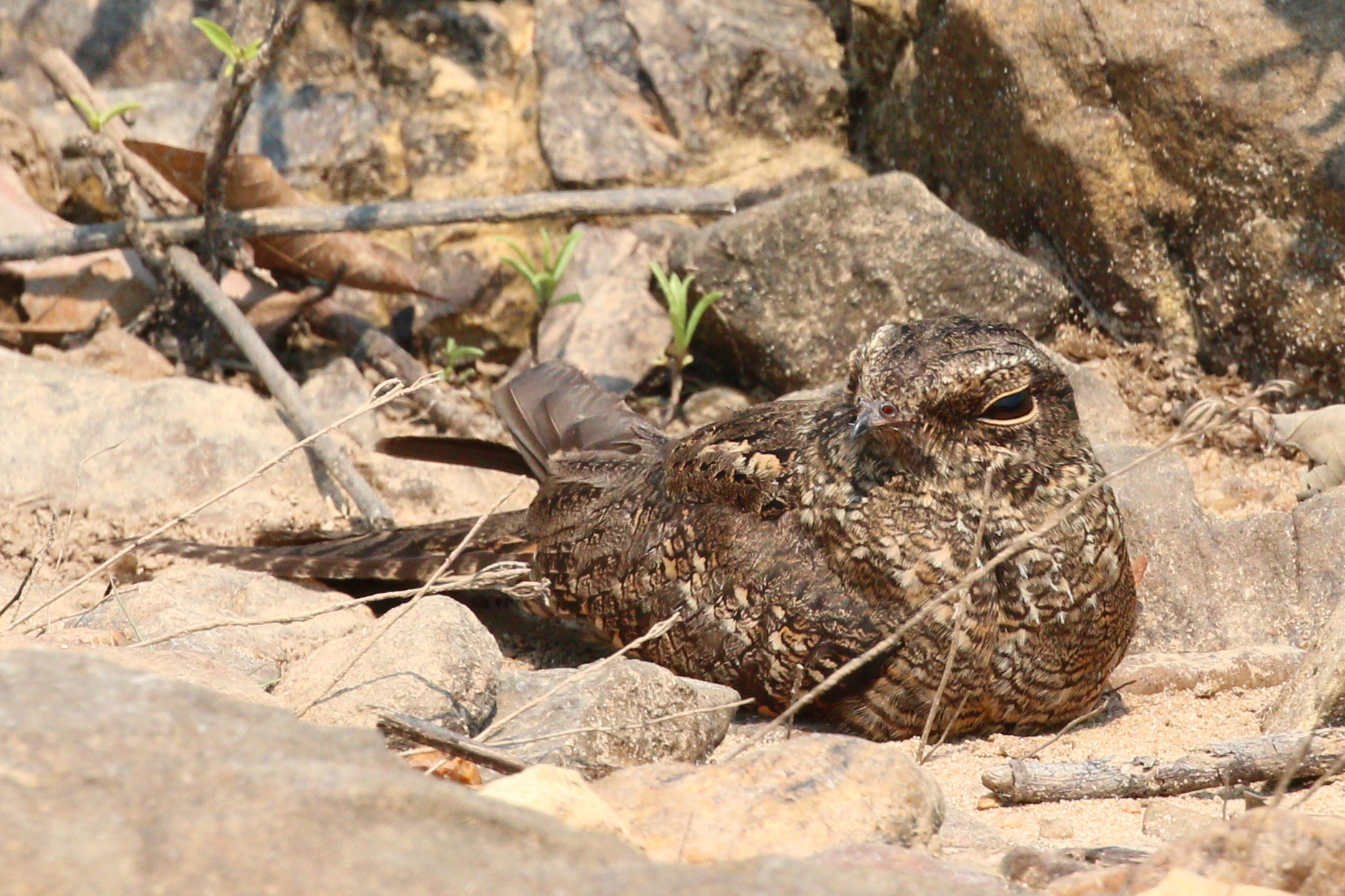
Incubating eggs, Rio São Manuel, South Amazon, Brazil
