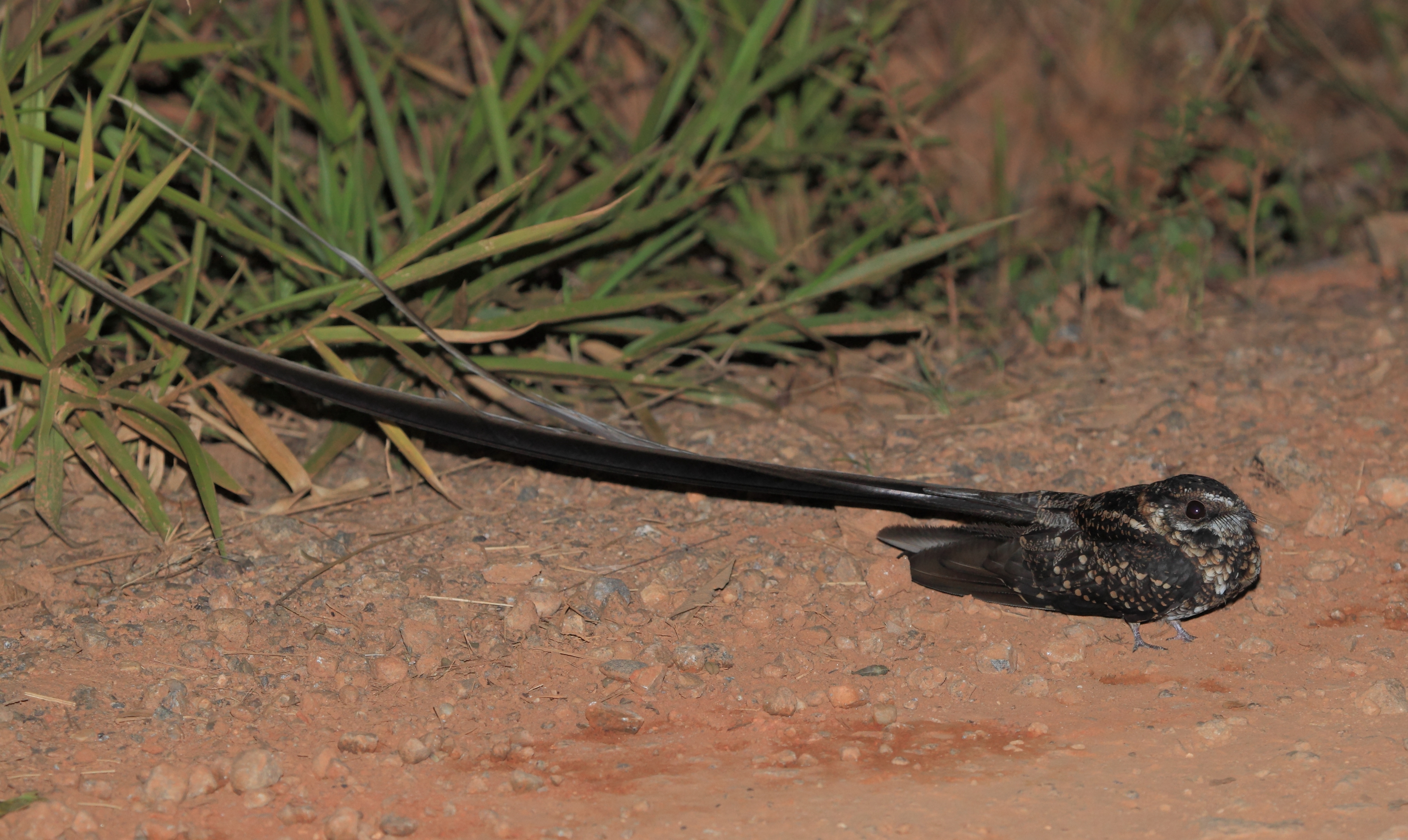
- male at Tremembé, São Paulo state, Brazil
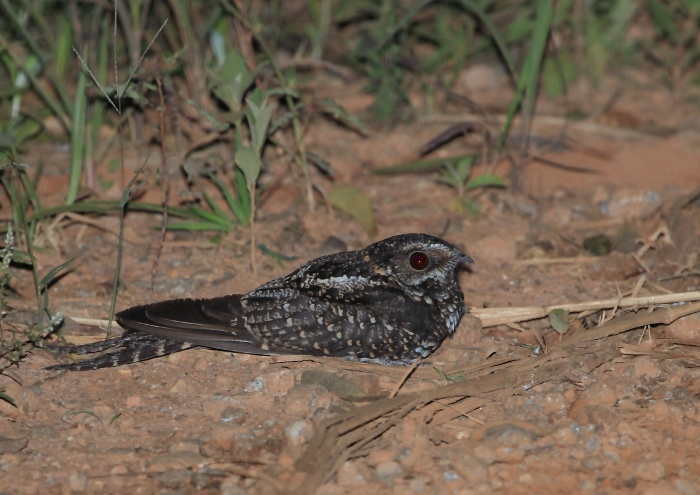
- female at Tremembé, São Paulo state, Brazil

Conservation status
- Least Concern (IUCN 3.1)

Scientific classification
- Kingdom: Animalia
- Phylum: Chordata
- Class: Aves
- Clade: Strisores
- Order: Caprimulgiformes
- Family: Caprimulgidae
- Genus: Hydropsalis
- Species: H. forcipata

Binomial name
- Hydropsalis forcipata (Nitzsch, 1840)

Synonyms
- Macropsalis creagra (Bonaparte, 1850); Macropsalis forcipata

= Long-trained nightjar =

Species of bird

The long-trained nightjar (Hydropsalis forcipata) is a species of nightjar in the family Caprimulgidae. It is found in Argentina and Brazil.

== Taxonomy and systematics ==
Some authors have contended that the binomial Macropsalis creagra bestowed by Bonaparte in 1850 is correct, but consensus now is that the specific epithet forcipata has priority.

The long-trained nightjar was formerly the only species placed in the genus Macropsalis. Based on the results of a 2023 molecular genetic study by Thiago Costa and collaborators, the species is now placed with three other species in the genus Hydropsalis that was introduced in 1832 by Johann Georg Wagler. The species is monotypic: no subspecies are recognised.

== Description ==
The male long-trained nightjar has extremely long outer tail feathers from which the species gets its name. It is 28 to 31 cm (11 to 12 in) long excluding those feathers, which are 48 to 68 cm (19 to 27 in) long. Both sex's upperparts are brown with spots and bars of grayish brown, tawny, buff, and cinnamon. The wings are similarly colored, with none of the white that others in family Caprimulgidae have. They have a broad tawny or tawny buff collar on the hindneck and a faint tawny patch on the throat. The breast is brown with tawny and buff bars and scallops, the belly and flanks buff with brown bars. The males elongated tail feathers have a broad white edge; the female's tail is darker and much shorter.

== Distribution and habitat ==
The long-trained nightjar is found in southeastern Brazil from Minas Gerais and Espírito Santo south to Rio Grande do Sul and into Argentina's far northeasternmost province, Misiones. It has been recorded as a vagrant in Paraguay. It inhabits the interior and edges of primary and secondary forest and woodland. In elevation it ranges from sea level to 1,800 m (5,900 ft), and higher in the north than the south.

== Behavior ==
=== Feeding ===
The long-trained nightjar has been recorded foraging by sallies from the ground, by hawking prey in flight, and by taking prey from leaves in flight. Its diet has not been detailed but is assumed to be insects.

=== Breeding ===
The long-trained nightjar is thought to breed between November and January in most of its range. Males make a courtship display on the ground by raising their tail in a conspicuous white "V". Eggs are laid on the ground on leaf litter without a conventional nest; the site is often shaded by a bush. The female does most of the incubation.

=== Vocalization ===
Both sexes of long-trained nightjar make "a repetitive, high-pitched 'tsip, tsip, tsip, tsip' call."

== Status ==
The IUCN originally assessed the long-trained nightjar as Threatened but since 2004 has rated it as being of Least Concern. It is variously rare, locally common, and common in different parts of its range.
