= Suzane von Richthofen =

Brazilian murderer

- Born: Suzane Louise von Richthofen; 3 November 1983 (age 43); São Paulo, Brazil
- Spouses: Sandra Regina Ruiz Gomes (m. 2014; div. 2015) Rogério Olberg (m. 2017; div. 2020) Felipe Zecchini Muniz (m. 2023)
- Children: 1
- Parent(s): Manfred Albert von Richthofen; Marisia von Richthofen
- Status: Released on parole since 2023
- Motive: Wish to inherit her parents' fortune; Parents' disapproval of her boyfriend
- Convictions: Two counts of triple qualified homicide; Tampering with evidence
- Penalty: 39 years and 6 months

Suzane Louise Magnani Muniz (born Suzane Louise von Richthofen; 3 November 1983) is a Brazilian woman who was convicted of murdering her parents on 31 October 2002 with the help of her boyfriend, Daniel Cravinhos, and his brother Christian. She was put on trial in São Paulo in July 2006 and was sentenced to thirty-nine years and six months in prison. She was released from prison on parole in 2023.

== Life ==
Suzane von Richthofen was born in São Paulo on 3 November 1983 to German engineer Manfred Albert von Richthofen (from Erbach an der Donau, Baden-Württemberg) and Brazilian psychiatrist Marisia von Richthofen (née Abdalla, of Lebanese and Italian descent — daughter of Salim Abdalla and Lourdes Magnani) and allegedly a distant relative of the World War I flying ace Manfred von Richthofen. Her father was a director of DERSA, a state-owned company managing São Paulo's highway system, and the chief engineer for the Mário Covas beltway project. She has a younger brother.

The Richthofens had a declared net worth of R$5.5 million. However, prosecutors suspect that Suzane's father embezzled at least €10 million from DERSA and deposited the money into two Swiss bank accounts in Suzane's name on her eighteenth birthday. Nothing prevents Suzane from gaining access to this money after completing her sentence.

=== Relationship with Daniel Cravinhos ===
After graduating from a German high school, Suzane studied law at the Pontifical Catholic University of São Paulo. In the summer of 1999, she met Daniel Cravinhos de Paula e Silva, who had been instructing her brother in flying model airplanes. Soon after, they began a relationship and took part in activities together, including attending a Brazilian jiu-jitsu class. While her parents initially permitted the relationship, they began having second thoughts upon discovering Daniel came from a working class background, refused to attend school or find a job and was a habitual marijuana user. In July 2002, while her parents were on vacation, Suzane allowed Daniel to move into the house. When they returned and protested his presence, Suzane suggested they buy her a flat in which the couple could live. Her father refused, saying that she could do whatever she liked but only if she earned her own money. Despite her parents' opposition, Suzane continued to see Daniel in secret.

== Murders ==
On the night of 31 October 2002, Suzane von Richthofen executed a premeditated plan to assassinate her parents, Manfred and Marísia von Richthofen. Having confirmed they were asleep, she deactivated the security alarm at the family estate and admitted her boyfriend, Daniel Cravinhos, and his brother, Christian, into the residence. While Suzane waited on the ground floor, the Cravinhos brothers proceeded to the primary bedroom, where they beat the couple with iron bars and subsequently strangled them with towels. Following the killings, the perpetrators staged a burglary by ransacking the premises and seizing a quantity of cash. In an attempt to establish an alibi, Suzane and Daniel visited a motel while Christian frequented a fast-food establishment. In the early hours of the following morning, the couple collected Suzane's younger brother from an internet café and returned to the villa, where they purported to discover the crime scene and alerted the authorities.

The subsequent investigation immediately cast doubt on the theory of a random burglary, as forensic evidence suggested the perpetrators possessed intimate knowledge of the household and its security systems. Detective suspicions were further aroused by Suzane's remarkably detached demeanour; she was observed using the family swimming pool with Daniel the day after the murders and hosted a birthday celebration just hours after her parents' funeral. Surveillance was placed on the trio, during which time it was noted that Christian Cravinhos had purchased a motorcycle using high-denomination banknotes that far exceeded his known financial means. On 9 November 2002, all three individuals were detained for questioning. Under interrogation, they confessed to the conspiracy and the execution of the murders.

Suzane was released from prison in May 2005, when the Supreme Federal Court granted her habeas corpus. She then awaited her trial under house arrest.

== Motives ==
Suzane claimed that her actions were motivated by love and a fear that Daniel would leave her as long as her parents were alive. Her lawyer, Denivaldo Barni, asserted that Suzane had no motive at all, but was forced into the crime by Daniel.

Another part of the motive may have been the Richthofens' wealth, which Suzane would inherit in the event of their death. Prosecutor Roberto Tardelli contended that Suzane wanted to "get her hands on the money and assets her parents had worked so hard to obtain"; she "wanted her freedom and independence without having to work for it". On trial, Cravinhos claimed that Suzane was abused by her father, which she and her brother deny.

In 2018, a judge denied request of freedom for von Richthofen, citing her egocentrism and a narcissistic personality disorder as serious personality traits that may have led to her crime.

== Trial ==
The trial of Suzane von Richthofen and the Cravinhos brothers commenced in São Paulo on 17 July 2006, following several procedural delays. The defendants were charged with homicídio qualificado, a classification in Brazilian law analogous to first-degree murder. During the proceedings, the defendants offered conflicting testimonies; von Richthofen attributed the primary responsibility for the plot to Daniel Cravinhos, whereas the brothers maintained they were acting solely upon her instructions. Prosecutor Roberto Tardelli rejected von Richthofen's defence, characterising her as the "mastermind" of the crime and describing her in highly critical terms to the jury. Tardelli sought maximum penalties of 50 years for each participant, citing the calculated and cold-blooded nature of the act.

On 22 July 2006, the court delivered its verdict, sentencing both Suzane von Richthofen and Daniel Cravinhos to 39 years and six months of imprisonment. Christian Cravinhos received a slightly shorter sentence of 38 years, which included his conviction for conspiracy. The murders were legally categorised as triplamente qualificados—three times qualified—owing to the cruel methods employed, the lack of opportunity for the victims to defend themselves, and the "morally sordid" motives behind the crime. This sentence reflected the gravity of a case that remains one of Brazil's most notorious criminal precedents regarding matricide and parricide.

== Release from custody ==
Following her transition to a semi-open regime in 2015, Suzane von Richthofen was officially granted a progression to an "open regime" (regime aberto) on 11 January 2023. This judicial decision allowed her to serve the remainder of her sentence outside of prison walls after completing 20 years of her original 39-year term, provided she adheres to specific court-mandated conditions. Since her release, she has reportedly settled in the municipality of Bragança Paulista, where she has attempted to maintain a private life and has reportedly established a small handicraft business focused on custom-made embroidery. She lived as a recluse in rural Angatuba, a city where her ex-boyfriend's relatives live. In February of the same year, Suzane sparked outrage and media attention when she announced on social media that she was opening an online store and would be selling in Brazil. Suzane is currently living in Bragança Paulista, and is in a relationship with Felipe Zecchini Muniz, a doctor. In 2023 Suzane became pregnant with her first child and gave birth to a son in 2024.

Daniel Cravinhos was also transitioned to an open regime several years prior to von Richthofen, having maintained a low profile and reportedly working in the field of aeromodelling and motorbike customisation since his release. His brother, Christian Cravinhos, has had a more tumultuous post-conviction history; although initially granted semi-open status, he was returned to a closed prison regime in 2017 following an arrest for attempting to bribe police officers during a domestic dispute in Sorocaba. By early 2026, Christian had once again qualified for supervised release, though he remains under stricter judicial oversight and monitoring than the other two perpetrators.

The Brazilian penal code dictates that life imprisonment is prohibited by the Constitution, and while sentences can be formally handed down for periods exceeding 30 years, eligibility for regime progression typically occurs after a specific fraction of the sentence is served, provided the inmate demonstrates "good behaviour" and passes rigorous psychological evaluations.

== In popular culture ==
The book Richthofen: O assassinato dos pais de Suzane (Richthofen: The murder of Suzane's parents), by Roger Franchini, was published in 2011. The work describes the murder and the subsequent events.

The book Suzane – Assassina e manipuladora (Suzane – Murderer and manipulator), by Ullisses Campbell, was published in 2020. This book is more focused on the life of Suzane von Richthofen and her psychological profile.

The 2021 Brazilian films The Girl Who Killed Her Parents and The Boy Who Killed My Parents are two different depictions of the crime. Brazilian actress Carla Diaz portrays Suzane von Richthofen in both films.

The 2022 Brazilian film The Girl Who Killed Her Parents: The Confession is the continuation of the 2021 films. It depicts the investigation, confession and trial of the perpetrators.

The 2025 television series Tremembé depicts the life of Suzane von Richthofen during her incarceration in a penitentiary in Tremembé. She is portrayed by Marina Ruy Barbosa in this TV series.

The 2026 Brazilian true-crime documentary, The Unthinkable Daughter, is built on new, exclusive interviews with the woman convicted of planning the murder of her parents. It is her first interview in more than a decade, and it arrives on Netflix as a feature-length film directed by Lygia M. Barbosa and Paulo Gambale Maká.

== See also ==
- Richthofen case
- Richardson family murders
- Jennifer Pan
- Freeman family murders
- Caffey family murders
