= Ullisses Campbell =

Brazilian journalist (born 1974)

- Born: November 30, 1974 (age 51); Belém, Pará, Brazil
- Occupations: Journalist, writer, screenwriter
- Awards: Prêmio Esso (1995, 1996, 1998); Prêmio Embratel (2000)

Ullisses Campbell (born November 30, 1974) is a Brazilian journalist, writer, and screenwriter. He is best known as the author of biographical books about notorious Brazilian criminals, including Suzane von Richthofen, Elize Matsunaga, Flordelis, and the so-called "Park Maniac". He currently serves as an executive producer and screenwriter for the Prime Video series Tremembé, and writes a regular column for the newspaper O Globo.

== Biography and career ==
Born in Belém, Pará, Ullisses Campbell has written for several major Brazilian newspapers, including A Província do Pará, O Liberal, Correio Braziliense, and Folha de S. Paulo, as well as for the magazines Veja, Superinteressante, and Época, where he served as a reporter. He is a three-time winner of the prestigious Esso Award (1995, 1996, and 1998) for his investigative reports on prostitution, land mafia, and child welfare in Pará, and also received the Embratel Prize in 2000 for a report on prostitution in a Belém shopping mall. In 2003, he was certified as a Journalist Friend of the Child by ANDI (Childhood Rights News Agency) and UNICEF. In 2015, while writing for Veja Brasília, he became the subject of a police report filed by relatives of former President Luiz Inácio Lula da Silva, who accused him of using false names to contact family members in order to gain access to a condominium for a story about a children's party. The magazine later admitted its error and retracted the note.

Since 2020, Campbell has turned his focus to biographical books on notorious female criminals, launching a successful series that began with Suzane – Assassina e Manipuladora (2020), about Suzane von Richthofen, convicted of murdering her parents—a book that faced a legal injunction attempt by Suzane herself, which was dismissed by the Court of Justice of São Paulo. He followed with Elize – A Mulher que Esquartejou o Marido (2021), about Elize Matsunaga, written without direct access to the subject due to her exclusivity contract with Netflix, yet offering new details beyond the documentary. Both titles became commercial bestsellers, with over 30,000 and 10,000 copies sold respectively by October 2021. In 2022, he concluded the Mulheres Assassinas trilogy with Flordelis – A Pastora do Diabo, about the politician and gospel singer convicted of her husband's murder. In 2024, he published the biography of Francisco de Assis Pereira, known as the "Park Maniac," and in September 2025, he released the anthology Tremembé – O Presídio dos Famosos, which details daily life inside São Paulo's largest penitentiary complex. He currently writes a True Crime column for the newspaper O Globo.

== Books ==
- Campbell, Ullisses (2020). Suzane - Assassina e Manipuladora (in Portuguese). Matrix. ISBN 9786556164823.
- Campbell, Ullisses (2021). Elize - A Mulher que Esquartejou o Marido (in Portuguese). Matrix. ISBN 9786556161259.
- Campbell, Ullisses (2022). Flordelis - A Pastora do Diabo (in Portuguese). Matrix. ISBN 9786556163055.
- Campbell, Ullisses (2024). Francisco de Assis - O Maníaco do Parque (in Portuguese). ISBN 9786556164977.
