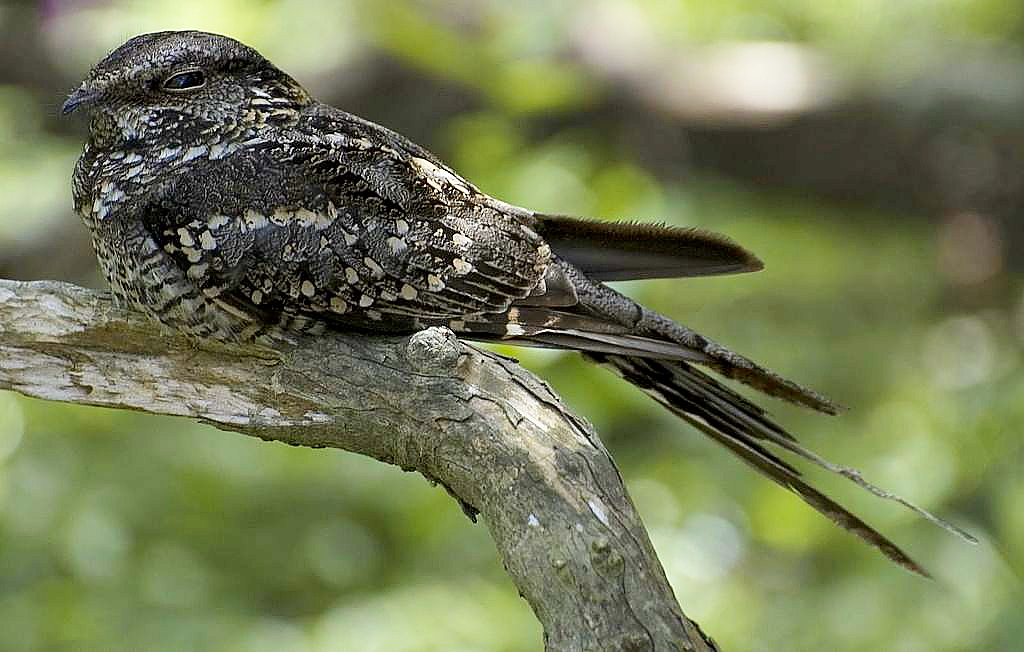
- Scissor-tailed nightjar (Hydropsalis torquata)

Scientific classification
- Kingdom: Animalia
- Phylum: Chordata
- Class: Aves
- Order: Caprimulgiformes
- Family: Caprimulgidae
- Genus: Hydropsalis; Wagler, 1832

Type species
- Caprimulgus furcifer Vieillot, 1817

= Hydropsalis =

Genus of birds

Hydropsalis is a genus of nightjars in the family Caprimulgidae. The species are widely distributed across the tropical and subtropical regions of the New World.

== Taxonomy ==
The genus Hydropsalis was introduced in 1832 by the German naturalist Johann Georg Wagler. The type species was designated by George Robert Gray in 1855 as Caprimulgus furcifer Vieillot 1817. This taxon is now considered as a subspecies of the scissor-tailed nightjar (Hydropsalis torquata). The genus name combines the Ancient Greek hudro- meaning "water-" with psalis meaning "pair of scissors".

The genus contains four species:

- White-tailed nightjar, Hydropsalis cayennensis – Costa Rica through north South America
- Ladder-tailed nightjar, Hydropsalis climacocerca – Amazonia
- Scissor-tailed nightjar, Hydropsalis torquata – Amazonia and south Peru to south Brazil and central Argentina
- Long-trained nightjar, Hydropsalis forcipata – southeastern Brazil and adjacent northeastern Argentina (Misiones)
