= Angatuba Ecological Station =

Conservation agency

- Estação Ecológica de Angatuba
- IUCN category Ia (strict nature reserve)
- Location within Brazil
- Nearest city: Angatuba, São Paulo
- Coordinates: 23.415875°S 48.360764°W
- Area: 1,394 hectares (3,440 acres)
- Designation: Ecological station
- Created: 13 August 1985
- Administrator: Instituto Florestal (SP)

The Angatuba Ecological Station (Portuguese: Estação Ecológica de Angatuba) is an ecological station in the state of São Paulo, Brazil.

== Location ==
The Angatuba Ecological Station is in the municipality of Angatuba in the state of São Paulo. It has an area of 1,394 hectares (3,440 acres). It is within the Angatuba State Forest. The terrain is hilly, with altitudes from 620 to 750 metres (2,030 to 2,460 ft).

== History ==
The ESEC was created by decree 23.790 of 13 August 1985 in state-owned land in the Angatuba municipality. The purpose was to protect existing ecosystems, fauna and flora, and to support educational and scientific activities. It is managed by the Instituto Florestal of São Paulo.

== Environment ==
The station contains a significant remnant of cerrado vegetation and forest at the southern limit of this type of biome. The cerrado is in contact with Atlantic Forest. It has a complex ecosystem of vital importance as a refuge for animals in danger of extinction. The vegetation consists of remnants of semideciduous forest in various stages of succession. 257 species of plant have been recorded including members of the Myrtaceae, Fabaceae, Lauraceae, Euphorbiaceae, Rutaceae, Rubiaceae, Mimosoideae and Caesalpinioideae plant families. Animals include the giant anteater (Myrmecophaga tridactyla), southern tamandua (Tamandua tetradactyla) and maned wolf (Chrysocyon brachyurus).

== Sources ==
- Barbosa Monteiro, Claudio Henrique; Soares do Prado, Bárbara Heliodora; Dias, Antonio Cecílio (February 2009), Plano De Manejo Estação Ecológica De Angatuba (PDF) (in Portuguese), São Paulo – Brasil: Floresta Estadual & Estação Ecológgica de Angatuba
- ESEC de Angatuba (ESEC) (in Portuguese), ISA: Instituto Socioambiental
- Estação Ecológica de Angatuba (in Portuguese), Ambiente Brasil, 13 May 2010
