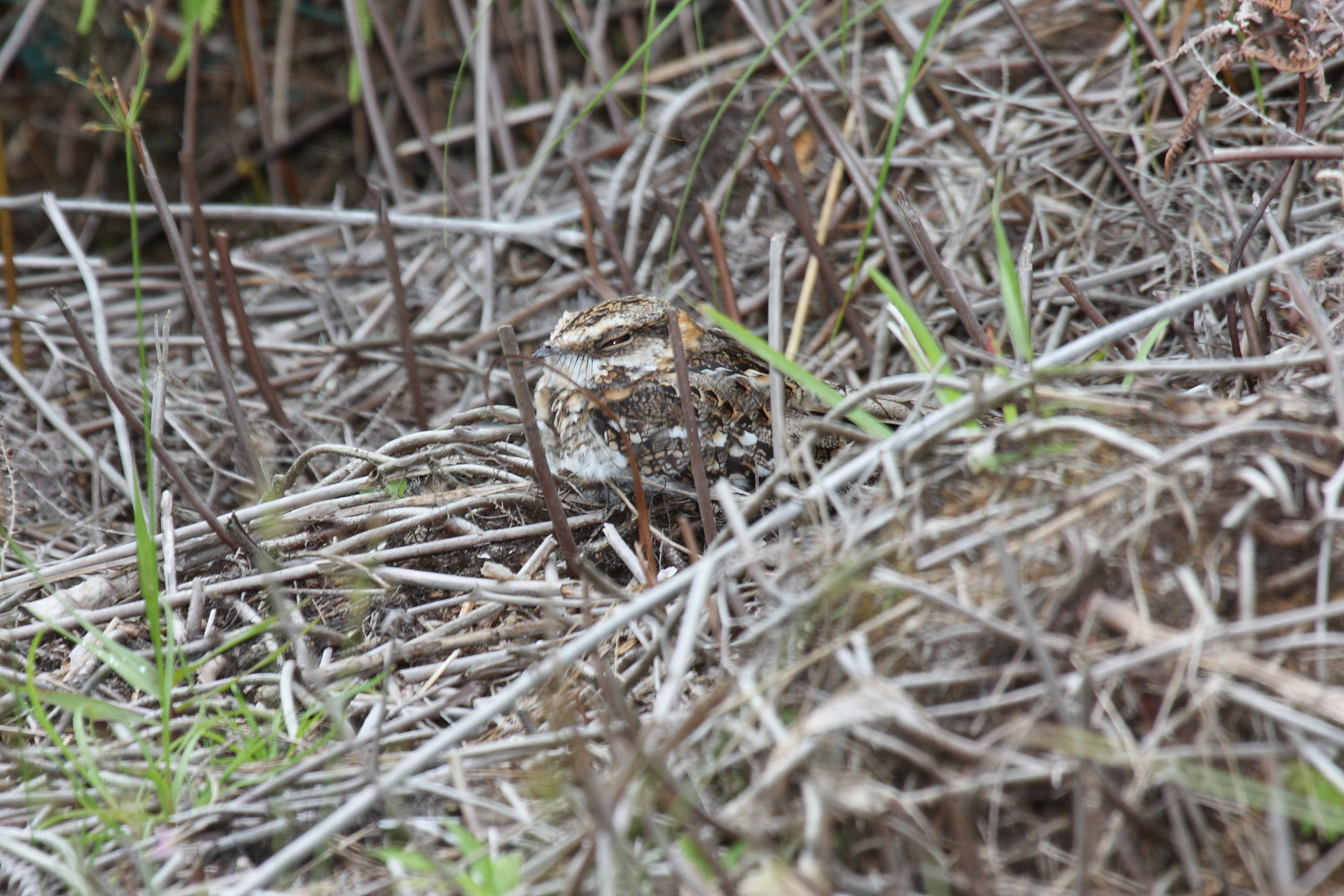

Conservation status
- Least Concern (IUCN 3.1)

Scientific classification
- Kingdom: Animalia
- Phylum: Chordata
- Class: Aves
- Order: Caprimulgiformes
- Family: Caprimulgidae
- Genus: Hydropsalis
- Species: H. cayennensis

Binomial name
- Hydropsalis cayennensis (Gmelin, JF, 1789)

= White-tailed nightjar =

Species of bird

The white-tailed nightjar (Hydropsalis cayennensis) is a species of nightjar in the family Caprimulgidae. It is found in the tropic regions of Central and South America.

== Taxonomy ==
The white-tailed nightjar was formally described in 1789 by the German naturalist Johann Friedrich Gmelin in his revised and expanded edition of Carl Linnaeus's Systema Naturae. He placed it with all the other nightjars in the genus Caprimulgus and coined the binomial name Caprimulgus cayennensis. Gmelin based his description on "L'engoulevent varié de Cayenne" that was described in 1779 by the French polymath Georges-Louis Leclerc, Comte de Buffon in his Histoire Naturelle des Oiseaux. A hand-coloured illustration was also published.

Based on a molecular phylogenetic study by Kin-Lan Han and collaborators published in 2010, the white-tailed nightjar is now placed with three other species in the genus Hydropsalis. This genus was introduced in 1832 by the German naturalist Johann Georg Wagler. The genus name combines the Ancient Greek hudro- meaning "water-" with psalis meaning "pair of scissors". The specific epithet cayennensis is from Cayenne, French Guiana, the type locality.

Six subspecies are recognised:

- H. c. albicauda (Lawrence, 1875) – Costa Rica to north Colombia
- H. c. aperta (Peters, JL, 1940) – west Colombia and north Ecuador
- H. c. cayennensis (Gmelin, JF, 1789) – east Colombia through Venezuela and the Guianas to north Brazil
- H. c. insularis (Richmond, 1902) – northeast Colombia, north Venezuela, and nearby islands Aruba, Bonaire, and Curaçao
- H. c. leopetes (Jardine & Selby, 1830) – Trinidad and Tobago
- H. c. manati (Pinchon, 1963) – Martinique (Lesser Antilles)

== Description ==
The white-tailed nightjar is 20 to 22.5 cm (7.9 to 8.9 in) long. Males weigh 33 to 40 g (1.2 to 1.4 oz) and females 32 to 38 g (1.1 to 1.3 oz). Males of the nominate subspecies have grayish brown uppersides with brown to blackish brown speckles and streaks. Their face has a white or buffy supercilium and "moustache". The hindneck has a broad tawny buff collar. The wings are generally grayish to blackish brown with tawny and buffy markings. A white band shows on both the spread and folded wing. The tail appears slightly forked; all but the innermost pair of feathers are partially to completely white. The chin and throat are white. The breast is buff with a cinnamon tinge, brown bars, and bold white spots. The belly and flanks are white with a pale buff wash. The nominate females are darker overall. They do not have white on the wings or tail. The throat is buffy, the breast brownish, and the belly buff with brown bars.

H. c. albicauda is similar to the nominate, but the male's belly has a strong buff tinge and the female's underparts are dark brownish buff. H. c. aperta has a longer wing and tail than the nominate. It is similar to albicauda though the female's upper- and underparts are darker. H. c. insularis is paler than the nominate and possibly smaller. Its upperparts, especially the crown, are buffier. H. c. leopetes is similar to the nominate, but the buff of its collar and other markings is richer. The male's underparts are darker and the female's upperparts paler. H. c. manati is darker than the nominate and has less white in the tail.

The call is "a high, thin pt-cheeeeeeeee, the second note a long-drawn-out, rising whistle that falls slightly at end." The male sings from dusk well into the night during breeding season. Calls include "a scratchy wheer in flight" and "a thin tic-tic" when flushed from a roost.

== Distribution and habitat ==
It is found in the "ABC Islands", Brazil, Colombia, Costa Rica, Ecuador, French Guiana, Guyana, Martinique, Panama, Suriname, Trinidad and Tobago and Venezuela.

The white-tailed nightjar is a bird of open landscapes such as savanna, pastures, scrubby grasslands, and hillsides with scattered bushes and thickets.

== Behavior and ecology ==
=== Feeding ===
The white-tailed nightjar is nocturnal. It mostly forages by sallying from the ground or perches but also will hunt in flight low over open grasslands. Its diet is insects but is not known in detail. It roosts on the ground during the day.

=== Breeding ===
The white-tailed nightjar's breeding seasons have not been well defined but are known to vary across its range. Males make a wing-clapping display. The clutch size is two; the eggs are laid directly on the ground and only the female incubates them.

== Status ==
The IUCN has assessed the white-tailed nightjar as being of Least Concern. It has a large range and large population, though the latter is believed to be decreasing. No specific threats have been identified except on Martinique, where habitat destruction and introduced predators are cause for concern.
