= Basilica of the Good Lord Jesus, Tremembé =

Coordinates: 22.9533°S 45.5411°W

Basilica of the Good Lord Jesus
- Basílica do Senhor Bom Jesus
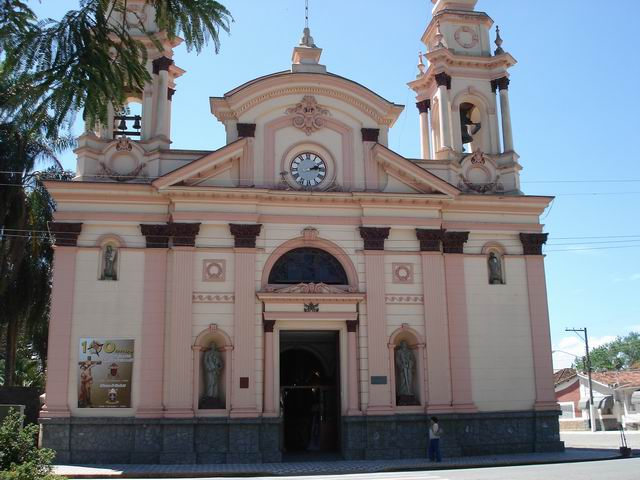
- Basilica of the Good Lord Jesus
- Location: Tremembé
- Country: Brazil
- Denomination: Roman Catholic Church

The Basilica of the Good Lord Jesus (Portuguese: Basílica do Senhor Bom Jesus) AKA Basilica of Tremembé is a Catholic church located in the city of Tremembé, São Paulo in the south of Brazil.

The image of Good Lord Jesus of Tremembe is carved in wood and for the Catholic Church is a prominent religious artifact.

The church of Bom Jesus de tremembé began as a chapel built by Manoel da Costa Cabral on his farm in the then town of Taubaté, in the place called Tremembé, in 1672.

The chapel was expanded in 1795. In 1907, the parish of Lord Buen Jesús de Tremembé was created, receiving the title of archdiocesan Sanctuary as reported on the site of the basilica.

In 1974, Pope Paul VI recognised the significance of the church by granting it the title of Minor Basilica.

== See also ==
- Roman Catholicism in Brazil
- Good Lord Jesus
