= Colégio Brasil =

1996 Brazilian children's telenovela

- Genre: Telenovela; Comedy; Drama
- Created by: Yoya Wursch
- Written by: Yoya Wursch
- Directed by: Roberto Talma; José Paulo Vallone
- Creative director: JPO
- Starring: Giuseppe Oristanio; Maria Padilha; Patrícia de Sabrit; Ana Kutner; Taumaturgo Ferreira
- Opening theme: Chovendo na roseira by Mônica Salmaso
- Country of origin: Brazil
- Original language: Portuguese
- No. of episodes: 117

Production
- Production location: São Paulo - Brazil
- Camera setup: Multiple-camera setup
- Running time: 60 mins.

Original release
- Network: SBT
- Release: May 6 – September 20, 1996

Related
- Sangue do Meu Sangue; Dona Anja

Colégio Brasil (Brazil College) is a children's telenovela created and written by Yoya Wursch, originally transmitted on SBT from May 6, 1996, to September 20, 1996.

== Cast ==
Actor/Actress	Role
Taumaturgo Ferreira	Manuel Boi
Maria Padilha	Nair
Edwin Luisi	Edmo
Giuseppe Oristânio	Lancelotti
Ítala Nandi	Miss Dayse
Carla Diaz	Tininha
Rafael Pongelupi	Paulinho
Juliana Poletti	Maria João
Arnaldo Barone	Gaio
Júnia Machado Pereira	Fernanda
Emerson Muzelli	Alex
Sofia Papo	Leni
Kaíto Ribeiro	Cristiano
Andreá Dietrich	Luíza
Paloma Bernardi	Antônia
Alexandre Paternost	Alceuzinho
Ana Kutner	Tininha
Ângela Dip	Lívia
Ângela Figueiredo	Maria Paula
Antônio Pedro	José Mário
Afonso Nigro	Mac
Bruna Marcotti	Fogueira
Cláudia Lira	Tereza
Diego Ramiro	Bruno Mattos
Fausto Maule	Pã
Gustavo Haddad	Vinícius
Hemílcio Fróes	Bruno Alencar
Henri Pagnocelli	Osvaldo
Jacqueline Cordeiro	Mírian
Jandir Ferrari	Flávio
Jerusa Franco	Mary Louca
Lorena Nobel	Ciça
Myriam Mehler	Olga
Norival Rizzo	Mister John
Patrícia de Sabrit	Júlia
Walesca Praxedes	Virgínia
