= Angatuba State Forest =

- Floresta Estadual de Angatuba
- Location within Brazil Location within São Paulo state
- Nearest city: Angatuba, São Paulo
- Coordinates: 23.416658°S 48.350166°W
- Area: 1,196.21 hectares (2,955.9 acres)
- Designation: State forest
- Created: 5 January 1965
- Administrator: Secretaria do Meio Ambiente - Instituto Florestal

The Angatuba State Forest (Portuguese: Floresta Estadual de Angatuba is a state forest in the state of São Paulo, Brazil.

== Location ==
The Angatuba State Forest is in the municipality of Angatuba in the state of São Paulo. It has an area of 1,196.21 hectares (2,955.9 acres). The terrain is moderately hilly. The climate is warm, with a dry winter. Temperatures range from 15 to 23 °C (59 to 73 °F) with an average of 19 to 20 °C (66 to 68 °F). Vegetation includes fragments of seasonal forest, with 80% of the area used for experimental plantings of exotic and native species.

== History ==
The Angatuba State Forest was created by state governor decree 44.489 of 5 January 1965. The forest contains the 1,394 hectares (3,440 acres) Angatuba Ecological Station, a strictly protected area created in 1985.

== Sources ==
- Angatuba (in Portuguese), Secretaria do Meio Ambiente - Instituto Florestal
- ESEC de Angatuba (ESEC) (in Portuguese), ISA: Instituto Socioambiental
