= Carla Diaz =

Brazilian actress

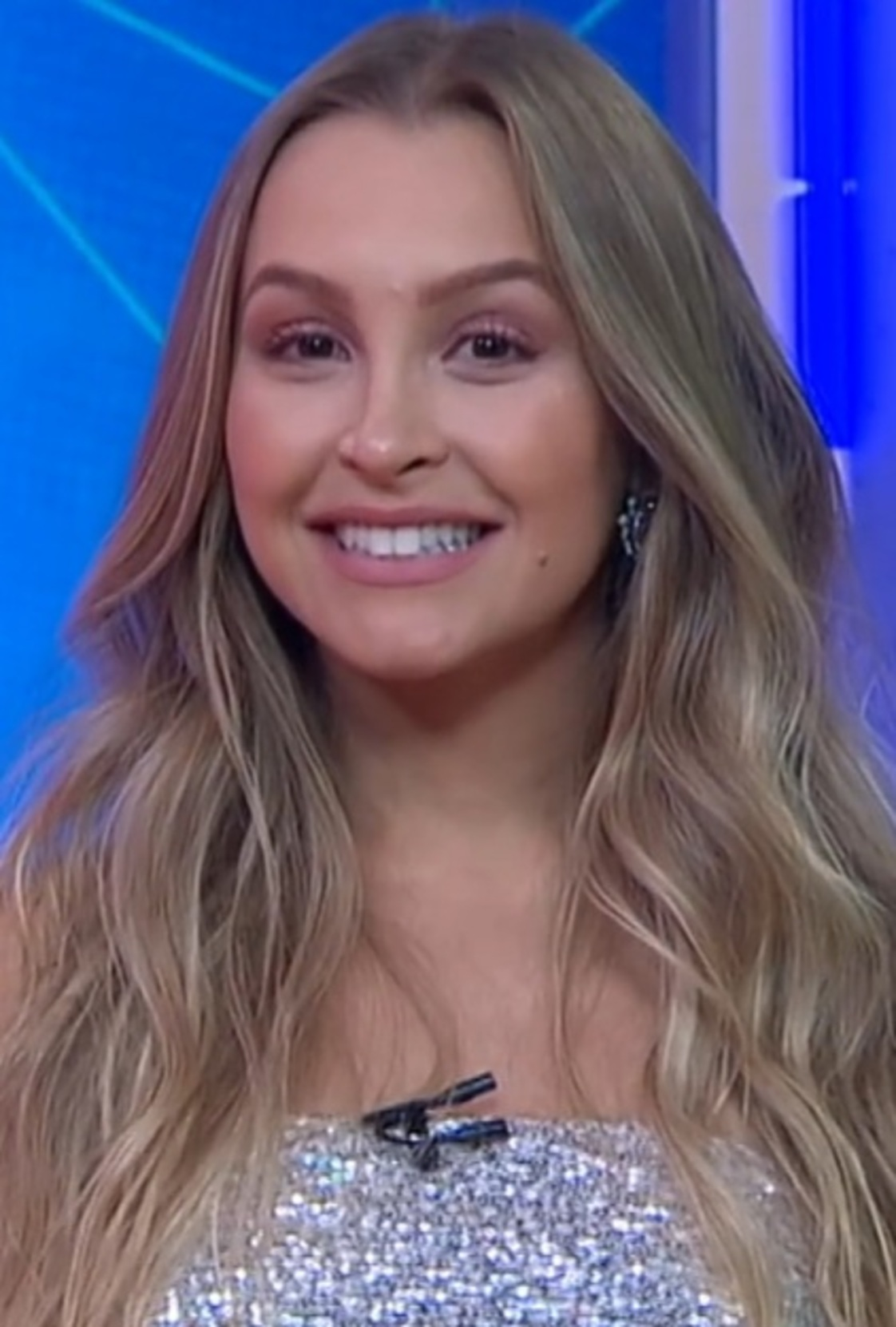
- Diaz in 2021
- Born: Carla Carolina Moreira Diaz; 28 November 1990 (age 35); São Paulo, Brazil
- Occupations: Actress, singer
- Years active: 1992–present (actress); 2016–present (singer)

Carla Carolina Moreira Diaz (Brazilian Portuguese: [ˈkaʁlɐ ˈdʒias]; born 28 November 1990) is a Brazilian actress and singer.

== Career ==
She began her career in 1992 with only two years old, doing television commercials where, overall, did about 80 commercials. In soap opera debuted in 1994 where she played Eliana, Éramos Seis, and in 1996 came to prominence as the sweet Tininha Colégio Brasil, both of SBT. In 1997 she became known nationally when acting in the end of first season of the novel Chiquititas Brasil as little Maria, where she stayed for four seasons, leaving in 1999.

In 2000 she moved to Rede Globo, where she joined the soap opera Laços de Família as sweet Raquel, but it was in 2001 that she established herself as an actress in O Clone, where she played Khadija Rachid, daughter of the protagonist Jade (Giovanna Antonelli). In 2003 she played Angélica in the miniseries A Casa das Sete Mulheres, a small guerrilla daughter of one of the seven protagonists. In 2004 Carla was the presenter of the Best of the Year Award Austregésilo de Athayde, the Academia Brasileira de Letras. In the following years starred in the Sítio do Picapau Amarelo, as temperamental Cléo, and A Grande Família, as Beatriz.

In 2007 Carla faced one of her toughest jobs in Sete Pecados, where Gina played the orphan, victim of bullying at school for being a carrier of HIV, suffering beatings and humiliations. In February 2009, she signed a contract with Rede Record, entering the trilogy Os Mutantes, the third stage Promessas de Amor, where she plays co-protagonist Juno. In 2011 she joined the cast of Rebelde, as the mysterious Márcia. In 2014, she plays the black bloc journalist, Lucrécia, in the political miniseries Plano Alto. Her last character on RecordTV was Princess Melina in A Terra Prometida.

In June 2011, Carla made a sensual rehearsal for the VIP men's magazine. In 2016, she debuted as a singer participating in the single "Voa" by Bernardo Falcone.

In August 2017, returned to Rede Globo to play Carine de Sá, in the novela of the 21 hours, A Força do Querer.

In January 2021, it was announced she is a contestant in the reality show Big Brother Brasil 21.

== Filmography ==
=== Television ===
Year	Title	Role	Notes
1994	Éramos Seis	Eliana	
1996	Colégio Brasil	Cristina (Tininha)	
1997	O Amor Está no Ar	Luísa Schneider (young)	Episode: "31 March 1997"
1997	Chiquititas Brasil	Maria	Seasons 1–4 (1997–1999)
2000	Laços de Família	Rachel Bueno	
2001	O Clone	Khadija Rachid	
2003	A Casa das Sete Mulheres	Angélica Gonçalves da Silva	
2003	Sítio do Picapau Amarelo	Cléo	Season 3
2006	A Grande Família	Paola de Oliveira Albuquerque Guimarães e Santos	Episode: "As Debutantes"
2007	Sete Pecados	Regina Silveira (Gina)	
2008	Casos e Acasos	Valéria (Val)	Episode: "O Concurso, o Vestido e a Paternidade"
2009	Promessas de Amor	Juno Fischer Matoso	
2011	Rebelde	Márcia Luz Maldonado	
2014	Milagres de Jesus	Keila	Episode: "A Cura de um Menino Possesso"
2014	Plano Alto	Lucrécia	
2016	A Terra Prometida	Melina	
2017	A Força do Querer	Carine de Sá	
2018	Malhação: Vidas Brasileiras	Clarissa	Episodes: "June 29–July 3, 2018"
2018	Super Chef Celebridades	Participant	Season 7; Reality show of Mais Você
2018	Espelho da Vida	Carine de Sá	Episode: "September 29, 2018"
2019	Espelho da Vida	Gisele	Episodes: "February 2–20, 2019"
2021	Big Brother Brasil	Herself (Housemate)	Season 21
2021	As Crianças Que Amamos	Herself	Episode 11
2024	Girl Who Killed Her Parents - The Series	Suzane Louise von Richthofen	Episode 1-6

=== Film ===
Year	Title	Role	Notes
1995	Super-Colosso: a Gincana da TV Colosso	Carlinha	
2000	Xuxa Popstar		
2014	Sequestro na Rede Social	Alessandra Saad	Short film
2018	Jogos Clandestinos	Margarida	
2020	Baseado Em Amores Reais	Elis	
2021	A Menina que Matou os Pais	Suzane Louise von Richthofen	
2021	O Menino que Matou Meus Pais	Suzane Louise von Richthofen	
2022	Rumble	Winnie	
2023	A Menina que Matou os Pais - A Confissão	Suzane Louise von Richthofen	
2023	Rodeio Rock	Lulli	

=== Internet ===
Year	Title	Function
2014	A Fazenda Online	Presenter

== Theater ==
Year	Title	Notes
1998	Chiquitour - 98 (Chiquititas - O Show)	Season 2
1999	Chiquitour - 99 (Chiquititas - O Show)	Season 4
2002	O Rapto das Cebolinhas	
2003	The Wonderful Wizard of Oz	
2003	É o Bicho - A Ordem Natural das Coisas	
2003	Loja de Brinquedos	
2006	Hänsel und Gretel	
2008	The Wonderful Wizard of Oz	2008–2010
2009	Motel Paradiso	
2010	Confissões de Adolescente	2010–2011
2013	Um Chorinho pra Dona Baratinha	
2015	A-traidos	
2015	Estúpido Cupido	2015–2016
2019	Em Casa A Gente Conversa	Malu
