= Angatuba =

Municipality in the state of São Paulo in Brazil

- Municipality
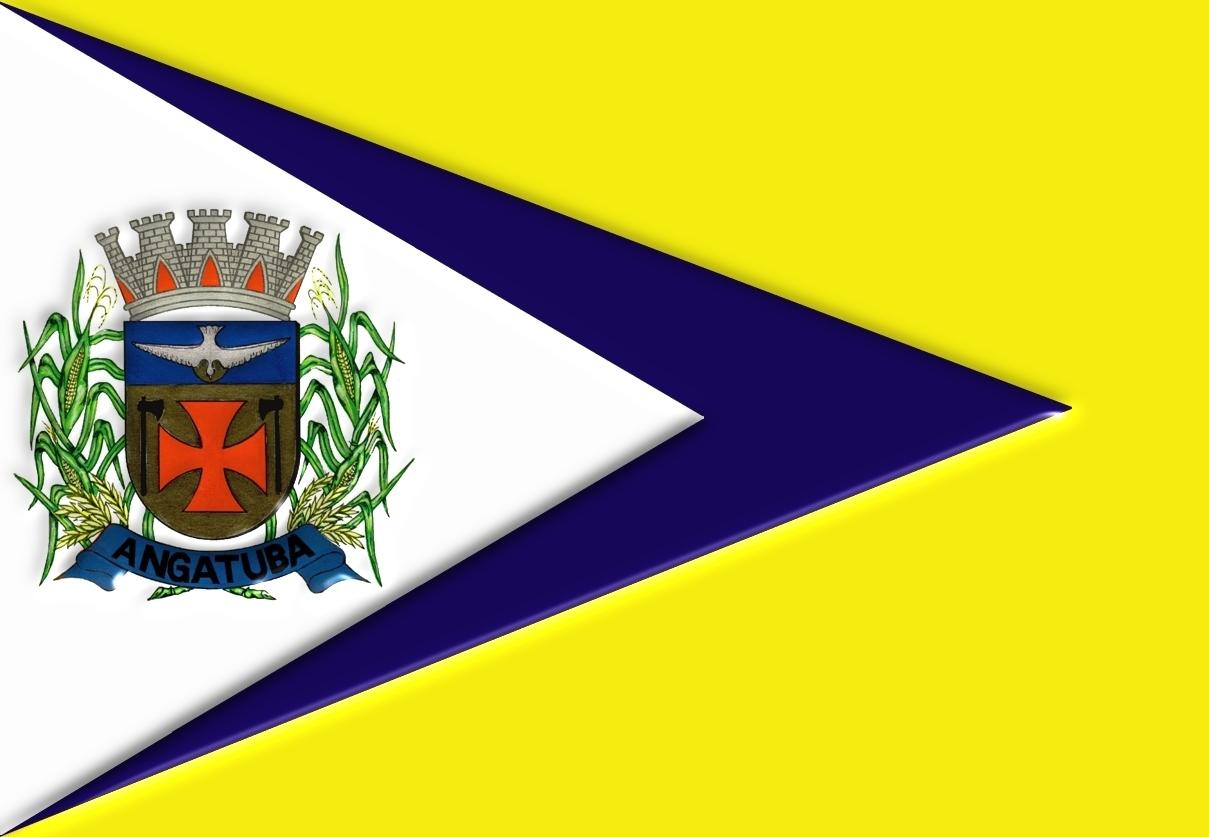
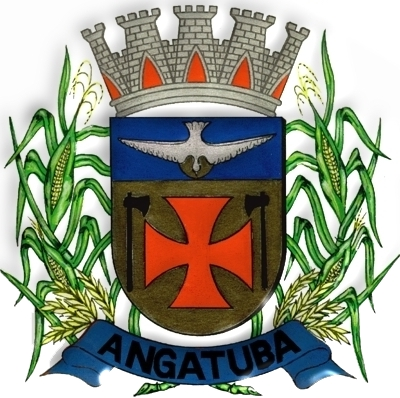
- Flag Coat of arms

- Location in São Paulo state

- Location in Brazil
- Coordinates: 23°29′25″S 48°24′46″W
- Country: Brazil
- Region: Southeast
- State: São Paulo

Area
  - Total: 1,028 km^{2} (397 sq mi)

Population (2020)
  - Total: 25,479
  - Density: 24.79/km^{2} (64.19/sq mi)
- Time zone: UTC−3 (BRT)

Angatuba is a Brazilian municipality in the state of São Paulo. The population is 25,479 (2020 est.) in an area of 1,028 km^{2} (397 sq mi). The highway Rodovia Raposo Tavares passes south of the city.

There is controversy about the meaning of the name Angatuba. It is a Tupi-Guarani word for "house of spirits" or "sweet fruit". Angatuba was founded in 1872, under the name Espírito Santo da Boa Vista. It became a town (vila) and an independent municipality in 1885, when it was separated from Itapetininga. It was elevated to a city (cidade) in 1906. The name was changed to Angatuba in 1908. In 1991 Campina do Monte Alegre was separated from Angatuba.

== Demographics ==
Historical population (municipality)
| Year | Population | %± |
|---|---|---|
| 1920 | 14,077 |
| 1940 | 13,162 | −6.5% |
| 1950 | 11,034 | −16.2% |
| 1960 | 15,055 | 36.4% |
| 1970 | 15,170 | 0.8% |
| 1980 | 17,052 | 12.4% |
| 1991 | 21,127 | 23.9% |
| 2000 | 19,297 | −8.7% |
| 2010 | 22,210 | 15.1% |
| 2022 | 24,022 | 8.2% |

== Geography ==
The municipality contains the 1,394 hectares (3,440 acres) Angatuba Ecological Station, a fully protected conservation unit created in 1985. The ecological station is contained within the Angatuba State Forest. This is a 1,196.21 hectares (2,955.9 acres) sustainable use conservation unit created in 1965.

== Media ==
In telecommunications, the city was served by Companhia de Telecomunicações do Estado de São Paulo until 1975, when it began to be served by Telecomunicações de São Paulo. In July 1998, this company was acquired by Telefónica, which adopted the Vivo brand in 2012.

The company is currently an operator of cell phones, fixed lines, internet (fiber optics/4G) and television (satellite and cable).

== Notable people ==
- João Francisco Benedan, vocalist and main member of Brazilian punk rock band Ratos de Porão
- Suzane von Richthofen, notorious convicted murderer

== See also ==
- List of municipalities in São Paulo
