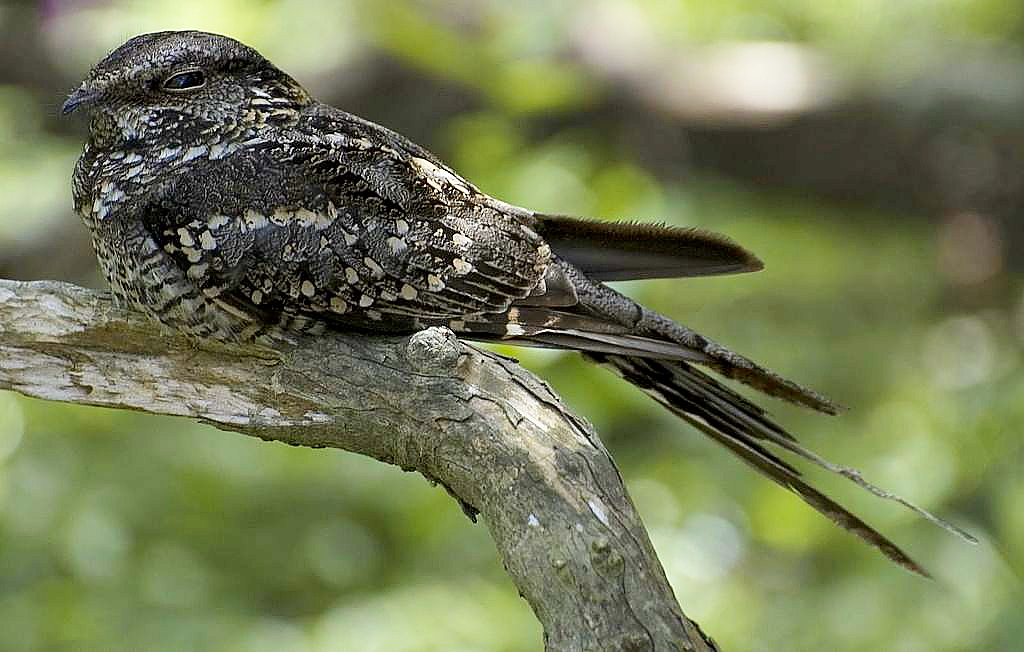

Conservation status
- Least Concern (IUCN 3.1)

Scientific classification
- Domain: Eukaryota
- Kingdom: Animalia
- Phylum: Chordata
- Class: Aves
- Clade: Strisores
- Order: Caprimulgiformes
- Family: Caprimulgidae
- Genus: Hydropsalis
- Species: H. torquata

Binomial name
- Hydropsalis torquata (Gmelin, JF, 1789)

Synonyms
- Caprimulgus torquatus; Hydropsalis brasiliana; Hydropsalis brasilianus

= Scissor-tailed nightjar =

Species of bird

The scissor-tailed nightjar (Hydropsalis torquata) is a species of nightjar in the family Caprimulgidae. It is distributed over much of eastern South America.

== Taxonomy ==
The scissor-tailed nightjar was formally described in 1789 by the German naturalist Johann Friedrich Gmelin in his revised and expanded edition of Carl Linnaeus's Systema Naturae. He placed it with the other nightjars in the genus Caprimulgus and coined the binomial name Caprimulgus torquatus. The scissor-tailed nightjar is now placed with three other species in the genus Hydropsalis that was introduced in 1832 by the German naturalist Johann Georg Wagler. The genus name combines the Ancient Greek hudro- meaning "water-" with psalis meaning "pair of scissors". The specific epithet torquata is from Latin torquatus meaning "collared".

Two subspecies are recognised:

- H. t. torquata (Gmelin, JF, 1789) – south Suriname, Brazil and east Peru
- H. t. furcifer (Vieillot, 1817) – south Peru to south Brazil and central Argentina

The specific epithet brasiliana or brasilianus was formerly sometimes used.

== Description ==
The most distinctive feature of the scissor-tailed nightjar is the male's elongated outer tail feathers, which are almost twice as long as its body. Not including those feathers, the two sexes are 25 to 30 cm (9.8 to 11.8 in) long; including them, the male is up to 66 cm (26 in) long. Males weight 47.5 to 63 g (1.7 to 2.2 oz) and females 48 to 60 g (1.7 to 2.1 oz). Males of the nominate subspecies have brown upperparts with grayish white speckles; the middle of the back also has blackish streaks and tawny spots. It has a broad tawny collar on the hindneck. The tail feathers are brown and the long outer pair have broad white tips. The chin is buffy, the throat buff or whitish with brown spots or bars, the breast buff with narrow brown bars, and the belly and flanks buff with wide brown bars. The wings are generally brown with tawny or buff streaks and spots, and do not have the white band that many other nightjars' wings have. The female's wings are tawnier, the tail has no white, and the outer tail feathers are only slightly longer than the inner ones. H. t. furcifer is larger than the nominate, generally paler, and its nuchal collar is buffier.

The song is "a prolonged sequence of tsips...sometimes for minutes on end". It is given at dusk and dawn from a perch and in flight. It also has "an extremely high tsig" flight call and "a low clucking sound".

== Distribution and habitat ==
The nominate subspecies of scissor-tailed nightjar is found from east central Peru across central Brazil. There is also an isolated population in Suriname. H. t. furcifer is found from southern Peru through Bolivia and across southern Brazil, and south to Paraguay, northern and central Argentina, and Uruguay. They inhabit open and semi-open landscapes such as second growth and arid scrub, grasslands, acacia groves, pastures, and urban parks. It can be seen along roads, especially those bordering sugar cane fields. In elevation it generally ranges from sea level to 1,100 m (3,600 ft) but is found as high as 1,700 m (5,600 ft) in Peru and 2,700 m (8,900 ft) in Bolivia.

The northern populations of scissor-tailed nightjar are generally resident. The southerly ones are thought to be migratory, spending the austral winter in southern Amazonia.

== Behavior ==
=== Feeding ===
The scissor-tailed nightjar is nocturnal. If forages by sallying from the ground or a perch. It has been documented feeding on insects of at least twelve orders. It apparently favors beetles (Coleoptera), of which at least 13 families have been identified in its diet. During the day it roosts on the ground in shade.

=== Breeding ===
Male scissor-tailed nightjars perform a wing-clapping display. The species' nesting season has not been defined but appears to include at least September to December. They lay two eggs directly on the ground or even bare rock.

== Status ==
The IUCN has assessed the scissor-tailed nightjar as being of Least Concern. It has a very large range, and though its population size is unknown it is believed to be stable. It is fairly common to common in most of its range and appears to tolerate human activity, even living in urban parks.
