= Tremembé =

City in Southeast, Brazil

- Município da Estância Turística de Tremembé
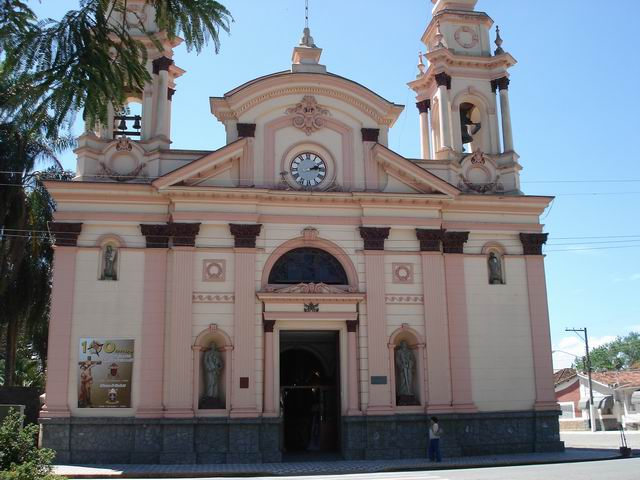

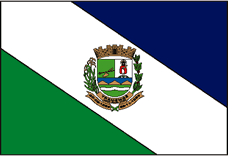
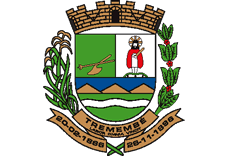
- Flag Coat of arms
- Motto: Labor Omnia Vincit "Work conquers all" "O trabalho vence tudo"
- Location in the state of São Paulo and Brazil

- Location within Brazil
- Coordinates: 22°57′35″S 45°32′25″W
- Country: Brazil
- Region: Southeast
- State: São Paulo
- Metropolitan Region: Vale do Paraíba e Litoral Norte

Government
  - Mayor: José Antônio de Barros Neto (PV)

Area
  - Total: 191.09 km^{2} (73.78 sq mi)
- Elevation: 560 m (1,840 ft)

Population (2020)
  - Total: 47,714
  - Density: 249.69/km^{2} (646.70/sq mi)
- Time zone: UTC−3 (BRT)
- Website: www.tremembe.sp.gov.br

Tremembé is a municipality in the state of São Paulo in Brazil. It is part of the Metropolitan Region of Vale do Paraíba e Litoral Norte. The population is 47,714 (2020 est.) in an area of 191.09 km^{2} (73.78 sq mi). The elevation is 560 m.

A shrine with a wooden sculpture of the Good Jesus is located here.

== Media ==
In telecommunications, the city was served by Companhia Telefônica Brasileira until 1973, when it began to be served by Telecomunicações de São Paulo. In July 1998, this company was acquired by Telefónica, which adopted the Vivo brand in 2012.

The company is currently an operator of cell phones, fixed lines, internet (fiber optics/4G) and television (satellite and cable).

== See also ==
- List of municipalities in São Paulo
- Tremembé people
