= Jesse Pomeroy =

American murderer (1859–1932)

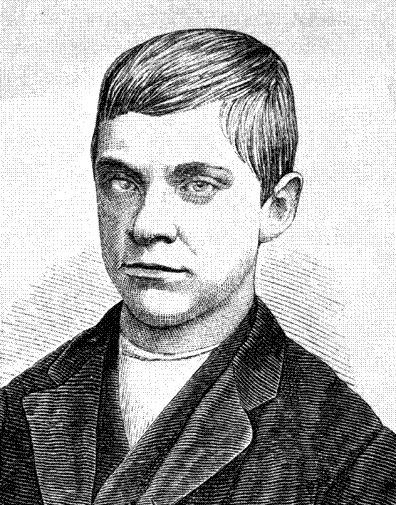
- Portrait sketch of Pomeroy, c. 1870–1880
- Born: Jesse Harding Pomeroy; November 29, 1859; Charlestown, Massachusetts, U.S.
- Died: September 29, 1932 (aged 72); Bridgewater, Massachusetts, U.S.
- Motive: Sexual gratification; sexual sadism
- Conviction: First degree murder
- Penalty: Death; commuted to life imprisonment

Details
- Victims: 2+
- Span of crimes: 1871–1874
- Country: United States
- State: Massachusetts
- Date apprehended: April 24, 1874

Jesse Harding Pomeroy (/ˈpɒmərɔɪ/; November 29, 1859 – September 29, 1932) was an American man who, as a juvenile, tortured and mutilated dozens of young boys in Charlestown, Massachusetts, and murdered at least two. He was found guilty by a jury trial held in the Supreme Judicial Court of Suffolk County in December 1874, and is the youngest person in the history of the Commonwealth of Massachusetts to be convicted of murder in the first degree.

== Early life ==
Jesse Harding Pomeroy was born on November 29, 1859, in Charlestown, Massachusetts, the second child of Thomas Jesse Pomeroy and Ruth Ann Snowman. His father was a butcher and Civil War Veteran, and his mother was a seamstress. For the first six months, (Note: While some accounts have claimed that Pomeroy was born with harelip, author John Marr described such details as "over-zealous journalism".) Pomeroy suffered from an unknown illness or infection. (Note: Contemporary reports have listed different causes. Pomeroy's mother blamed the illness on an allergic reaction to a smallpox vaccine, while others claimed it was a viral infection.) While he eventually recovered, he was left with a deformed right eye that lacked any noticeable pupil and iris. While Pomeroy had a close relationship with his mother, Pomeroy's father was a known alcoholic and extremely abusive towards his family. The elder Pomeroy would frequently abuse young Pomeroy, sometimes stripping his son naked, and severely beating him.

As a child, Pomeroy was described as a loner, and often preferred solitary activities away from others. Throughout his youth, Pomeroy would suffer from severe headaches, episodes of vertigo, epileptic-like symptoms, and sudden mood swings. During this time, Pomeroy began exhibiting disturbing behavior. On one occasion, when Ruth had purchased a pair of lovebirds, she later discovered them with their heads twisted off.

== Attacks ==
Between 1871 and Fall 1872, Pomeroy is known to have committed a minimum of nine attacks on children. His victims were prepubescent boys, ranging in age from 4 to 10, all from the Charlestown area. The victims were lured by Pomeroy into isolated areas or abandoned buildings through various methods. Once his victims were alone, they were overpowered; they were then stripped naked and tied, and their mouths were stuffed with a handkerchief. Once restrained, the victims were beaten and tortured with sticks or rope, with Pomeroy sometimes masturbating in front of them.

On February 21, 1872, a seven-year-old named Tracy Hayden of Chelsea was beaten and left on Powder Horn Hill. On May 20, an eight-year-old boy, Robert Maier, was also beaten and left in an abandoned outhouse in Chelsea. On July 22, Johnny Balch was discovered tied up and beaten in an abandoned outhouse on Powder Horn Hill.

Soon after the third attack, The Boston Globe reported that "the public are considerably excited" about what they described as a "Fiendish Boy" who was violently attacking younger children.

Around August 2, 1872, Ruth Ann Pomeroy and her children moved from their home in Chelsea to Broadway Street in the South Boston area. By this point, Thomas Pomeroy had abandoned his family.

A fourth attack against a young child occurred on August 17, 1872. Seven-year-old George Pratt was found beaten by local fishermen in South Boston. Barely a month later, on September 11, another seven-year-old boy, Joseph Kennedy, was assaulted. He was supposedly lured to a vacant boathouse near the South Boston salt marshes; once there, he was beaten and cut with a pocketknife.

Six days later, on September 17, railway workers walking along the Hartford and Erie Line in South Boston stumbled upon Robert Gould, a five-year-old boy, who had been tied to a telegraph post near the tracks, beaten, and slashed by a knife.

A while after the last attack, Pomeroy was walking past South Boston's Police Station Six and decided to look in the window. Joseph Kennedy, the child who had been assaulted on September 11, was inside. He spotted Pomeroy looking through the window and pointed him out to the officers as his assailant.

Pomeroy was immediately arrested and readily admitted to being the "boy torturer". Eventually, the rest of the children who had been assaulted throughout the year all identified Pomeroy as their attacker.

On September 21, 1872, Jesse Pomeroy was arraigned and heard in front of Juvenile Court Judge William G. Forsaith. The 12-year-old Pomeroy confessed to the attacks, was found guilty, and sentenced to six years at the State Reform School for Boys in Westborough, Massachusetts.

== Later crimes ==
In February 1874, at the age of 14, Pomeroy was paroled back to his mother and brother in South Boston. His mother ran her own dressmaking shop, and his brother Charles sold newspapers.

In March 1874, a 10-year-old girl from South Boston named Katie Curran went missing. On April 22, 1874, the mutilated body of a 4-year-old boy named Horace Millen was found in the marsh of Dorchester Bay. Immediately, the police detectives sought out Pomeroy, despite lacking evidence implicating him in the crime. The body of Katie Curran was found later, in the basement of Pomeroy's mother's dress shop. Her remains were hastily and carelessly concealed in an ash heap.

== Trial ==
Pomeroy was taken to view Millen's body and asked if he committed the murder. At the coroner's inquest, Pomeroy was denied the right to counsel.

The case of Commonwealth v. Pomeroy was heard in the Massachusetts Supreme Judicial Court (Suffolk County, Boston) on December 9 and 10, 1874. At the trial, the Attorney General argued for a verdict of guilty of murder in the first degree. In his closing arguments, he urged an alternative charge of murder with extreme atrocity, which, according to Massachusetts law, is first-degree murder, but differs from the original charge in the requirement of premeditation.

Pomeroy was pronounced guilty on December 10, 1874. The jury added a recommendation for mercy on account of his young age.

Pomeroy's attorney, Charles Robinson, filed two exceptions which were overruled in February 1875, at which point Pomeroy was sentenced to death by hanging.

== After the trial ==
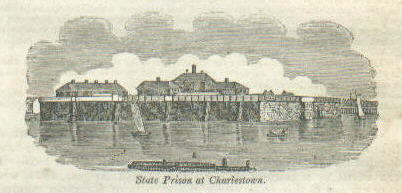
Charlestown State Prison, as depicted in 1840.

It remained for the Governor to sign the death warrant and assign a date for Pomeroy's execution. However, Governor William Gaston refused to comply with this executive responsibility. The only legal means of sparing Pomeroy's life was through the Massachusetts Governor's Council, and only if a simple majority of the nine-member Council voted to commute the death penalty. Over the next year and a half, the Council voted three times: the first two votes upheld Pomeroy's execution, and both times Governor Gaston refused to sign the death warrant.

In August 1876, the Council took a third vote, anonymously, and Pomeroy's sentence was commuted to life in prison in solitary confinement. On the evening of September 7, 1876, Pomeroy was transferred from the Suffolk County Jail to the State Prison at Charlestown, and began his life in solitary. He was 16 years and 9 months old. Pomeroy remained incarcerated at the Charlestown State Prison.

In prison, Pomeroy claimed that he taught himself to read several foreign languages, including Hebrew; and one visiting psychiatrist found that he had learned German with "considerable accuracy". He wrote poetry and argued with prison officials over his right to have it published, and he studied law books and spent decades composing legal challenges to his conviction and requests for a pardon. A psychiatric report on Pomeroy made in 1914, and quoted extensively in The Boston Globe after his death, noted that Pomeroy had made 10 or 12 "determined attempts" to escape and that handmade tools were frequently found in his possession.

A prison warden reported finding rope, steel pens, and a drill that Pomeroy had concealed in his cell or on his person. According to The Globe, Pomeroy lost an eye after attempting to destroy the side of his cell by redirecting a gas pipe. The 1914 psychiatric report claimed that Pomeroy had shown the "greatest ingenuity and a persistence which is unprecedented in the history of the prison."

=== Final years and death ===
In 1917, with the support of District Attorney Joseph Pelletier, Pomeroy's sentence was commuted to the extent of allowing him the privileges afforded to other life prisoners. At first, he resisted, wanting nothing less than a pardon. He eventually adjusted to his changed circumstances and appeared in a minstrel show at the prison. In 1929, by this time an elderly man in frail health, he was transferred to Bridgewater Hospital for the Criminally Insane, where he died on September 29, 1932.

== In media ==
=== Bibliography ===
- Pomeroy appeared in the 1994 crime novel The Alienist, written by Caleb Carr. In the novel, Pomeroy is discussed and the main character, Dr. Laszlo Kreizler, is mentioned as one of multiple experts called during the trial to assess him. Pomeroy later made an appearance in the novel's television adaption, where he is played by Stephen Louis Grush.
- Fiend: The Shocking True Story of America's Youngest Serial Killer (2000) by Harold Schechter. ISBN 978-0-6710-1448-3
- The Wilderness of Ruin: A Tale of Madness, Fire, and the Hunt for America's Youngest Serial Killer by Roseanne Montillo (2015). ISBN 978-0-0622-7349-9

=== Podcasts ===
- My Favorite Murder E116 "Robot Grandma" (2018). Hosts Karen Kilgariff and Georgia Hardstark discuss Pomeroy's crimes and those of Japanese murderer Issei Sagawa.

== See also ==
- Eric Smith
- George Stinney
- Josh Phillips
- Lionel Tate
- List of youngest killers
- Murder of James Bulger

== Bibliography ==
- Carr, Caleb (March 15, 1994). The Alienist: A Novel. Random House Publishing. pp. 228–229. ISBN 0-679-41779-6.
- Chermak, Steven; Bailey, Frankie (January 25, 2016). Crimes of the Centuries: Three Volumes. Bloomsbury Publishing USA. pp. 625–627. ISBN 978-1-6106-9594-7.
- Daley, Christopher (October 20, 2018). Murder & Mayhem in Boston: Historic Crimes in the Hub. Arcadia Publishing. ISBN 978-1-6258-5306-6.
- Davis, Carol (May 22, 2014). Children Who Kill: Profiles of Pre-Teen and Teenage Killers. Allison & Busby. ISBN 978-0-7490-1623-4.
- Fass, Paula (1997). Kidnapped: Child Abduction in America. Oxford University Press. ISBN 978-0-1951-1709-7.
- Haskell, E. (1892). The Life of Jesse Harding Pomeroy: The Most Remarkable Case in the History of Crime Or Criminal Law.
- Jenkins, Philip (December 1, 2004). Moral Panic: Changing Concepts of the Child Molester in Modern America (unabridged ed.). Yale University Press. ISBN 978-0-3001-0963-4.
- Lane, Brian; Gregg, Wilfred (1992). The Encyclopedia of Serial Killers. Headline Publishing Group. ISBN 978-0-747-23731-0.
- Moffatt, Gregory (July 30, 2008). Stone Cold Souls: History's Most Vicious Killers. Bloomsbury Publishing USA. ISBN 978-0-3133-4589-0.
- Montillo, Roseanne (March 17, 2015). The Wilderness of Ruin: A Tale of Madness, Fire, and the Hunt for America's Youngest Serial Killer. Harper Collins. ISBN 978-0-0622-7349-9.
- Myers, Wade (June 15, 2004). "Serial Murder by Children and Adolescents". Behavioral Sciences and the Law. 22 (3). John Wiley & Sons: 357–374. doi:10.1002/bsl.590. ISSN 0735-3936. PMID 15211557.
- Myers, Wade; Husted, Dave; Safarik, Mark; O'Toole, Mary (July 2006). "The Motivation Behind Serial Sexual Homicide: Is It Sex, Power, and Control, or Anger?". Journal of Forensic Sciences. 51 (4). Wiley-Blackwell: 900–907. doi:10.1111/j.1556-4029.2006.00168.x. ISSN 0022-1198. PMID 16882237.
- Myers, Wade; Safarik, Mark; Chan, Heng; Yaksic, Enzo (November 14, 2022). "Serial sexual murder by juveniles and the role of sexual sadism: An international study". Behavioral Sciences and the Law. 41 (5). John Wiley & Sons Ltd.: 262–279. doi:10.1002/bsl.2616. ISSN 0735-3936. PMID 36960891.
- Newton, Michael (2006). The Encyclopedia of Serial Killers. Infobase Publishing. ISBN 978-0-8160-6987-3.
- Paul, Jonathan (January 1, 2003). When Kids Kill: Shocking Crimes of Lost Innocence. Virgin Publishing. ISBN 978-0-7535-0758-2.
- Pember, Don (2001). Mass Media Law. McGraw-Hill. ISBN 978-0-0723-7053-9.
- Pomeroy, Jesse (1875). Autobiography of Jesse H. Pomeroy. Harvard University.
- Pomeroy, Jesse (1920). Selections from the Writings of Jesse Harding Pomeroy: Life Prisoner Since 1874. J.A. Cummings & Company.
- Richardson, Cris (2020). Violence in American Society: An Encyclopedia of Trends, Problems, and Perspectives [2 volumes]. Bloomsbury Publishing. ISBN 978-1-4408-5468-2.
- Schechter, Harold (May 31, 2024). Natural Born Celebrities: Serial Killers in American Culture. Simon and Schuster. ISBN 978-1-4767-2913-8.
- Schechter, David (November 13, 2012). Fiend: The Shocking True Story Of Americas Youngest Serial Killer. University of Chicago Press. ISBN 978-0-2267-3870-3.
- Sterns, Albert (1948). The Life and Crimes of Jesse Harding Pomeroy (reprint ed.). Harvard University.
- Thompson, Elizabeth (January 1, 1882). Heredity: Its relations to human development. Institute of Heredity.
- Tibbetts, Stephen; Piquero, Alex (December 30, 2021). Criminological Theory: The Essentials (4th ed.). SAGE Publications. ISBN 978-1-0718-3823-5.
- Vronsky, Peter (August 14, 2018). Sons of Cain: A History of Serial Killers from the Stone Age to the Present. Penguin Publishing. ISBN 978-0-4252-7697-6.
- Wolanin, Tyler (May 29, 2024). The Political Life of Reverend Roland D. Sawyer. Rowman & Littlefield. ISBN 978-1-6669-4551-5.
- Wilson, Colin (January 1, 1995). A Plague of Murder: The Rise and Rise of Serial Killing in the Modern Age. Robinson Publishing. ISBN 978-1-8548-7249-4.
