= Richardson family murders =

2006 triple murder in Medicine Hat, Canada

- Location: Medicine Hat, Alberta, Canada
- Date: April 23, 2006; 20 years ago
- Attack type: Triple murder by stabbing
- Weapon: Knife
- Deaths: 3
- Victims: Jean-Marc Richardson; Debra Doolan Richardson; Tyler Jacob Richardson
- Perpetrators: Jasmine Richardson, 12, and Jeremy Allan Steinke, 23
- Motive: Revenge against Jasmine Richardson's family for disapproving of Steinke's predatory relationship with her
- Verdict: Richardson and Steinke: Guilty on all counts Lancaster: Pleaded guilty
- Convictions: Richardson and Steinke: First-degree murder (3 counts); Lancaster: Obstruction (Note: An accessory-to-murder charge was dropped after a plea deal.)
- Sentence: Richardson: 10 years in prison, including four years of psychiatric institutionalization and four-and-a-half years of conditional supervision Steinke: Life imprisonment with the possibility of parole after 25 years Lancaster: 1 year of house arrest

Three members of the Richardson family were murdered in Medicine Hat, Alberta, Canada, in April 2006. The murders were planned and committed by the family's 12-year-old daughter Jasmine Richardson, alongside her 23-year-old boyfriend Jeremy Steinke, now going by the name Jackson May. Richardson and Steinke were each convicted on three counts of first-degree murder. Richardson, who had turned 13 before being convicted, is the youngest person in Canada ever convicted of multiple first-degree murder counts. She received a sentence of 10 years' imprisonment, which was completed on May 6, 2016.

== Discovery ==
At 1:00 p.m. on April 23, 2006, the bodies of 42-year-old Jean-Marc "Marc" Richardson and his 48-year-old wife Debra were found in the basement of their home, and the body of their 8-year-old son Tyler Jacob was discovered upstairs. Jacob's young friend had been the one to discover the bodies, having arrived for a playdate with Jacob, and alerted his mother, who then notified police. Marc had 24 stab wounds, Debra had 12 stab wounds, and Jacob had a slit throat and stab wounds to his head and torso.

Absent from the home at that time was the couple's 12-year-old daughter, Jasmine. For a time, it was feared that she might have also been a victim, but she was arrested the following day in the community of Leader, Saskatchewan, about 130 kilometres (81 mi) away, with her 23-year-old boyfriend Jeremy Allan Steinke, after investigators had uncovered a stick figure drawing depicting her family being murdered inside Jasmine's locker at school. Both were charged with the three murders. Later, on May 3, 2006, Steinke's friend Kacy Lancaster, 19, was charged with being an accessory for driving them away in her pickup truck later in the day and for disposing of evidence.

== Perpetrators and background ==
=== Jasmine Richardson ===
Jasmine Richardson (born October 21, 1993) was born to Debra (née Doolan) and Jean-Marc Richardson in Ontario, Canada. The Richardsons were recovering drug addicts who had met three years previously at a gymnasium in Sudbury and married the following year. Jasmine's younger brother, Tyler Jacob Richardson—known to his friends by his middle name—was born five years later. Shortly before Jacob was born, the family had relocated to Okotoks, a small farming town outside Calgary, Alberta. With Marc and Debra fully recovered from drug addiction and sober, and their family of four now complete, they moved into an older-built townhouse in Okotoks where they set out to raise their new family and start a new life. The family initially struggled to pay bills and had to rely on food banks, but were able to eventually purchase a home and move to Medicine Hat, in part thanks to a promotion Marc received at his job, in 2005. It was around this same time that Jasmine began to use the Internet more frequently.

Jasmine was described as a bright and studious straight-A student who made the honour roll at her Catholic school and was actively involved in the fine arts program, as well as being an outgoing and sociable young girl who made lots of friends, held an active social life, and enjoyed typical teen interests. However, with her increasing social media usage and interest in the goth subculture, and her continuously becoming friends with older men, her parents began to worry.

In the summer of 2005, Richardson and her friends began frequenting the Medicine Hat Mall, where they encountered a group of older goth kids; enraptured, they soon started hanging out with this group and modeling themselves after them—Jasmine included. Richardson's behavior soon deteriorated after that, with frequent rule-breaking such as repeatedly violating the school dress code in favour of unauthorized gothic attire, and being argumentative with her parents. Her social media profiles and the contents thereof were also of great concern to her family; she created numerous accounts on various social networking sites such as MySpace and Zorpia in which she falsified her age as being older than she actually was, posted inappropriate photos, claimed to be bisexual and Wiccan and drink alcohol, and indicated she possessed disturbing interests such as serial killers, scarification, and "kinky shit." On her profile, she listed American serial killer Jeffrey Dahmer and American industrial musician Marilyn Manson, among others, as her "heroes."

In January 2006, at the Medicine Hat Mall, she was introduced by a friend and schoolmate of hers to 23-year-old Jeremy Steinke. Even while under the mounting pressure of increased scrutiny by her parents, the two became close, frequenting local concerts and the mall together as well as corresponding with one another on social media, and eventually, they began a relationship. Her relationship with her parents was fraught with even more strain as they struggled to retain control over their daughter; she started sneaking out of the house to meet Steinke in secret, and going to concerts without their permission, and she had often spoke of running away from home and wanting out of her parents' household and into foster care over the oppression of their rules. She had also begun to develop an animosity towards her younger brother; according to Steinke, he witnessed Jasmine strangling Jacob on one occasion, and Jasmine purportedly expressed embarrassment over her brother having to accompany her at family events. Jacob had reportedly confided in a family friend that he was afraid of his older sister. She had been grounded and had her electronics confiscated after two separate incidents in which she had left a terrified Jacob alone at home while she was meant to be babysitting him, to go hang out with her friends and Steinke; and when she had convinced her parents to allow her to go to a punk rock concert, only to sneak away from them and later be caught making out with Steinke in a back alley. According to Jasmine, the latter incident was her breaking point, and she soon began fantasizing about being rid of her parents once and for all.

=== Jeremy Steinke ===
Jeremy Allan Steinke (born January 15, 1983) was born to Jacqueline Ann May in Medicine Hat, Alberta. He reportedly endured a lifetime of physical abuse throughout his childhood, at the hands of both his biological father and two of his stepfathers; he recalled a time when his second stepfather had locked him in a deep freezer, and when he defensively broke the arm of an abusive ex-boyfriend of his mother's using a lead pipe. Jeremy and his mother frequently moved around due to the onslaught of violence and chaos in their home, and he spoke of never being able to properly make friends as a result. He attended elementary school in the Medicine Hat neighbourhood of South Ridge from first to third grade, and Crestwood from fourth to sixth grade. He was mercilessly bullied at both schools, with children often teasing him about his last name, referring to him as "Stinky."

According to May, he had been diagnosed with attention-deficit hyperactivity disorder (ADHD) and placed in a program at his school for developmentally disabled youth; this elicited further ridicule from other students. His mother and her various husbands and boyfriends were all alcoholics, and it was not long until Jeremy started consuming alcohol himself, which he began at age 14. He also started indulging in various drugs, including shrooms, ecstasy, acid, and marijuana, and he additionally began cutting himself. That same year, he dropped out of high school. At 16, he moved out of his mother's home to live in Saskatchewan with his biological father, but moved out shortly thereafter, following a disagreement with his stepmother. He reportedly tried to redeem himself from being troubled, including enrolling at Medicine Hat College to recoup his high school education and taking on various jobs, including a position at Tim Hortons and a prospective oilman trade apprenticeship, to ensure a stable future, but these avenues failed. He soon dropped out of Medicine Hat College and quit looking for employment.

Steinke came into contact with the goth subculture and slowly began to immerse himself in it, listening to heavy metal music, aspiring to be a metal musician himself, and manufacturing his appearance to 'acceptably' meet the standards of the goth lifestyle, including dressing in all-black, wearing dark eyeliner and face paint, and shaving his head. He recruited much younger adults and teenagers to become his group of gothic friends, and garnered their respect by supplying them drugs and alcohol. On his VampireFreaks page, created in 2005, he spoke of "liking to kill" prostitutes, "then playing with their insides and eating" them, and expressed his "likes" on the page as "fellow lycan brethren" and his corresponding "dislikes" as "niggers" and "pigs."

He was introduced to the 12-year-old Richardson by a mutual friend within the goth movement and a schoolmate of hers, Kaylee. Their relationship began a month after they met. Steinke maintained that throughout the relationship, he never knew of Jasmine's true age and that she had, in fact, lied to him about her age; however, friends of his nevertheless expressed disgust at the relationship, emphasizing to Steinke that he was a grown man and she was underage, and encouraged him to break up with her. At the time of the murders, he was unemployed and living in a trailer that he shared with his mother.

== Murders ==
Steinke, drunk and high on a number of different substances including cocaine, marijuana, and ecstasy, entered the Richardson family home through a basement window. He made enough noise that it roused Debra Richardson, who went to investigate. Upon her seeing him, he lunged at her and pelted her with slashings and stab wounds; she held up her hands and arms to shield herself from attack. Hearing Debra's screams, Marc Richardson charged into the basement; he went at Steinke with a screwdriver and jabbed Steinke in the eye; however, Steinke overpowered him and started stabbing him repeatedly. Marc's last words were reportedly to ask Steinke why he was doing this; Steinke replied, "Because it's what your daughter wanted."

Eight-year-old Jacob Richardson was upstairs, frightened, having heard the entire altercation. He was stabbed multiple times and his throat slit; investigators found evidence that he had fought valiantly against his attacker, and it was alleged that he had utilized his toy lightsaber to defend himself in the attack. Who had been the one to inflict the stab wounds on Jacob and slit his throat is debated; Steinke claims that it was Jasmine, Jasmine insisted it was Steinke. They apparently rationalized the murder of Jacob with the notion that he was too emotionally sensitive to be orphaned and thus he had to die as well.

After the murders, Jeremy sped away frantically in his truck, leaving Jasmine with the bloody crime scene. She rinsed off the knife used to kill her brother, filled a canvas bag with clothes and toiletries and took her mother's purse. She used her mother's credit card to withdraw cash from an ATM at 7-Eleven to dispatch a taxicab to Jeremy's trailer. When she arrived, they had sex. Later in the morning, they went to a house party hosted by a friend of Steinke's, at an address not far from where the Richardsons laid dead. Witnesses observed Jasmine Richardson laughing and talking joyously with other attendees, as well as her sitting in Steinke's lap and passionately making out with him, giving no indication of what had transpired hours before. Steinke was also reported as showing off his eye injury, inflicted by Richardson's father in their earlier scuffle, to partygoers. At one point, Steinke blurted out that he had killed his girlfriend's family, stating that he "gutted them like fish", with Richardson corroborating and adding, "My little brother gargled." After the party, they fled along with Kacy Lancaster, Kaylee, and another teenage girl to Leader, Saskatchewan, where they were located at a convenience store and arrested.

== Motive ==
According to friends of Jasmine, her parents had grounded her for dating Steinke because of the age disparity. Her friends had also criticized their relationship. According to friends of Steinke, he told them he was a 300-year-old werewolf. He allegedly told his friends that he liked the taste of blood, and wore a small vial of blood around his neck. He also had a user account at the VampireFreaks.com website. Jasmine had a page at the same site, leading to speculation they met there. An acquaintance of Steinke also contended that the couple had actually met at a punk rock show in early 2006; however, it was clarified in Robert Remington and Sherri Zickefoose's 2009 book Runaway Devil: How Forbidden Love Drove a 12-Year-Old to Murder Her Family that the couple had actually met by being introduced to one another by a mutual friend. The couple were also found to be communicating at Nexopia, a popular website for young Canadians. Various messages they sent to each other were available to the public, before the accounts were permanently removed by Nexopia staff.

"My girlfriends family are totally unfair,
They say that they really care,
They don’t know what is going on, they just assume,
As their greed continues to consume,
She is slowly going insane,
She continues to thank [sic] that I came into her life to help her out,
And to stop what they keep trying to shout,
It’s all total bullshit,
Their throats I want to slit,
They will regret the shit they have done,
Especially when I see to it that they are gone,
They shall pay for their insulince [sic],
Finally there shall be silence,
Their blood shall be payment!"

— Jeremy Steinke on his public Nexopia page, one month before the murders

Richardson's own user page, under the name "runawaydevil", falsely said she was 15 years of age and ended with the text "Welcome to my tragic end." Just hours prior to committing the murders, Steinke and some friends reportedly watched the film Natural Born Killers (1994), which tells the story of two victims of traumatic childhoods who become lovers and spree killers, and are glorified by the mass media. Steinke told his friends that he and his girlfriend should go about their plans in a similar manner, but without sparing her little brother. Steinke also said to an undercover officer, "You ever watch the movie Natural Born Killers?... I think that's the best love story of all time..."

== Legal outcome ==
=== Jasmine Richardson ===
Under the Youth Criminal Justice Act, Richardson's name could no longer be published in Canada after she became a suspect. Under the same act, twelve is the youngest possible age at which a person can be charged with a crime; convicts who were under fourteen years of age at the time they committed a crime cannot be sentenced as adults, and cannot be given more than a ten-year sentence. On July 9, 2007, Richardson, who had by then turned 13, was found guilty of three counts of first-degree murder. She is believed to be the youngest person ever convicted of a multiple murder in Canada.

On November 8, 2007, she was sentenced to the maximum allowed under law for someone her age, 10 years imprisonment. Her sentence included credit for eighteen months already spent in custody, to be followed by four years in a psychiatric institution and four-and-a-half years under conditional supervision in the community. In September 2011, Richardson began attending classes at Mount Royal University in Calgary, Alberta during the final years of her sentence. She was released from a five-year sentence at a psychiatric hospital in the fall of 2011, and in October 2012, it was reported her rehabilitation was going well, and she expressed remorse for her actions that experts considered genuine. In May 2016, her sentence was completed and she was freed of any further court-ordered conditions, restrictions, or supervision after a final sentence review on May 6, 2016. Her criminal record was set to be expunged in April 2021—the fifteenth anniversary of the murders—provided that she engage in no further criminal activity; however, due to the COVID-19 pandemic, it was formally expunged a year early, in 2020.

=== Jeremy Steinke ===
Steinke admitted to the murder of the parents in conversation with an undercover police officer while in custody; he also asserted that Jasmine was the one to murder her little brother Jacob. While both of them were in jail, he and Richardson exchanged letters in which they professed love to one another and vowed to visit one another no matter what. In one of these letters, Steinke proposed marriage to Richardson, which she accepted. He was tried in November 2008 and found guilty by a jury on three counts of first-degree murder for the killings of the three Richardson victims. On December 15, 2008, Steinke was sentenced to three life sentences, one for each first-degree murder count. The sentences are to be served concurrently, and Steinke will be eligible for parole after serving twenty-five years. While in prison, Steinke legally changed his name to Jackson May, to honour his mother Jacqueline May, who died on March 29, 2016.

=== Kacy Lancaster ===
The accessory to murder charge against the couple's friend Kacy Lancaster was dropped, and she pleaded guilty to an obstruction charge in Medicine Hat provincial court. She received one year house arrest as part of the plea bargain and was ordered to refrain from drugs and alcohol.

== In the media ==
- The Richardson family murders have been featured on the Investigation Discovery show Deadly Women, with Jasmine as the subject and referred to simply as "J.R." due to her age. It is the first segment of the episode "Forbidden Love."
- The story has been featured on Killer Kids, a Canadian documentary series. In the reenactment, because of Canada's YCJA laws, Jasmine was given the pseudonym "Amanda Patterson."
- Canadian-South African author Loreth Anne White's 2022 novel The Patient's Secret is loosely based on the Richardson family murders.

== See also ==
- Murder of Bich Pan, another parricide in Canada committed by the victim's daughter and her boyfriend
- Barbecue murders, American parricide committed by the victims' daughter and her boyfriend
- Richthofen family murders, Brazilian parricide committed by the victims' daughter and her boyfriend
- Johnson family murders, American parricide committed by the victims' daughter, also motivated by her parents' forbidding her to date her older boyfriend
- Caffey family murders, American parricide committed by the victim's daughter, also motivated by her parents' forbidding her to date her boyfriend
- Murder of Joanne Witt, American parricide committed by the victims' daughter and her boyfriend
- Twisted Desire, a 1996 Lifetime original movie based on a real life American parricide committed in 1990 by the victims' daughter and her boyfriend
- Halderson family murders
- Whitaker family murders
- Ewell family murders
- Bever family murders
- Staudte family murders
- Freeman family murders
- Menendez family murders
- Lin family murders (Australia)
- Murder of Peter Porco
- Christine Paolilla
- List of youngest killers
- Starkweather–Fugate spree killings
- Murder of James Bulger
