= Killer Kids =

Canadian television documentary series

- Country of origin: Canada
- No. of seasons: 4
- No. of episodes: 70

Original release
- Network: LMN
- Release: May 16, 2011 – March 25, 2015

Killer Kids is a Canadian documentary series. It first premiered in 2011 on The Biography Channel and aired for an additional three seasons on LMN before cancellation.

== Episodes ==
=== Season 1 ===
No. overall	No. in season	Title	Original release date
1	1	"Occult Killers"	May 16, 2011
In Canada, a 7-year-old boy is murdered and partially eaten by a 14-year-old boy. Elyse Pahler, a fifteen-year-old California girl who snuck out of her parents’ home to meet three male acquaintances from school. The boys (teenagers who had a heavy metal band) killed Elyse as a sacrifice to Lucifer so their band would take off. In Northport, New York, 17-year-old Ricky Kasso murders his friend, 17-year-old Gary Lauwers, deep inside Aztakea Woods over ten stolen bags of angel dust. He later tells police that Satan appeared to him in the form of a crow to tell him he was pleased with the deed.
2	2	"Psychopath Killers"	May 23, 2011
Canadian serial killer Peter Woodcock, a teenager who murdered three young children in 1956 and 1957. Woodcock was placed in psychiatric care. While institutionalized, he murdered a fellow psychiatric patient in 1991, alongside another murderer from the institute. In France, Guy Rampillon aka Guy Georges ("The Beast of the Bastille") from the age of 14 planned evil acts. And in England, a young girl named Mary Bell strangled two boys to death.
3	3	"Sexual Killers"	May 30, 2011
In Courtenay, British Columbia, 6-year-old Dawn Shaw is raped and murdered by paroled sex offender, 15-year-old Jason Gamache. Ironically, Gamache was asked to mind Shaw's siblings while the search for the little girl was conducted. Two 13-year-old Essex Junction, Vermont, girls take a shortcut home and are brutalized by two teenagers (Louis Hamlin Jr and Jamie Savage) but one girl lives to identify the killers of her friend. The sexually motivated murder of Joe Geeling by Michael Hamer.
4	4	"Hate Killers"	June 6, 2011
A gay Toronto teacher is slain by youthful homophobes, the murder of Ecuadorian Marcelo Lucero by 7 racist teens looking to attack "a Mexican." Murder of homeless Pierre "Pierrot" Bourras by 3 young boys, and an English woman is murdered for dressing in Goth style.
5	5	"Family Killers"	June 13, 2011
On April 23, 2006, Canadian police find the bodies of the Richardson family, killed by 12-year-old Jasmine Richardson and her 23-year-old boyfriend Jeremy Steinke. Wendy Gardner, a young teen, convinces her boyfriend, James Evans, to murder her overly strict grandmother. In France, an adorable choirboy, Pierre Folliot, murders his parents and his brother but his sister survives.
6	6	"School Killers"	May 16, 2011
Eight days after the Columbine massacre, Canadian Todd Smith opens fire at his high school, killing one student and wounding another. In 1995, French teen "Leila Zafar" murders her friend in her school restroom after an argument. In 1997, American youth Luke Woodham murders his mother before going to Pearl High School to murder his ex-girlfriend, her friend and wounding 7 others.
7	7	"Group Killers"	June 27, 2011
In 1993, two British young friends abducted two-year-old James Bulger, took him to a railway track and brutally murdered him. In Canada, a teenager Darren Huenemann, arranges for his two friends, Derik Lord and David Muir, to murder his mother and grandmother while hanging out with a girl to establish an alibi. While running away from their California homes, two teen girls, Cindy Collier and Shirley Wolf, kill elderly Anna Brackett for her car.
8	8	"Baby Killers"	July 11, 2011
Matthew Reid was a 3-year-old foster child from Canada who had been with the same foster family since the age of 10-months. The family took in an additional foster child about whom they knew little. This new girl, 14-year-old Jane Jennie Ewing, suffocated Matthew on her first night in the home. The girl was found to have mental disabilities. Though she was known to have violent tendencies, the new foster parents were not told of the problems. Two 17-year-olds (Panna Krom and Stella Bourdais) conceal their pregnancies, murder and poorly hide their newborn babies.

=== Season 2 (LMN) ===
No. overall	No. in season	Title	Original release date
1	9	"Foul Ball & Framed"	November 26, 2012
An 8-year-old girl vanishes without a trace and an entire community mobilizes to find her. Police target a neighbor with a suspicious past, but when the body is found, no one is prepared for what it reveals. A hard-working teen with a bright future is set up and slaughtered to death in Fishtown, Philadelphia, by the friends he least expects.
2	10	"Redemption & Salt in the Wounds"	November 26, 2012
An adopted son develops violent tendencies. Two teenage siblings commit murders in a Nevada trailer park.
3	11	"Spoiled Rotten & Bad Dreams"	December 3, 2012
Family members are shot to death in their sleep and a teen is suspected in her friend's murder.
4	12	"Thrill Kill & Poisoned"	December 17, 2012
Alyssa Bustamante kills a little girl in St. Martin's, Missouri. A teenager poisons her grandmother.
5	13	"Sibling Rivalry & The Warwick Slasher"	September 1, 2013
After Ronald Salazar's parents leave him in El Salvador for twelve years, he finally re-joins them in Florida and meets his three siblings. But the reunion goes horribly wrong when culture shock and sibling rivalry turns Ronald into a stone cold killer. When four murders take place in the same neighborhood, police suspect a serial killer is on the loose. What they don't suspect is that they are chasing after the youngest serial killer in U.S history.
6	14	"A Scream & Banana Split"	September 8, 2013
Two cousins, 16-year-old Mario Padilla and 14-year-old cousin, Samuel Ramirez obsessed with the movie Scream, plan a killing spree. 13-year-old bullying victim Eric Smith gets revenge on an innocent four-year-old boy.
7	15	"The Lost Boy & Family Heirloom"	September 15, 2013
Raised in a polygamous cult, a 16-year-old boy is cast out and forced to fend for himself. When this hardworking teen turns to drugs all hell breaks loose in West Jordan, Utah. To the outside world, the Crains seem to be a model family. But there's a darkness lurking alongside a family heirloom that shatters their lives with deadly force.
8	16	"The Runner & Natural Born Killers"	September 22, 2013
A teenage boy from rural Indiana commits a double homicide claiming a demon told him to do it. Together, with two other prisoners he plans a jailbreak to reclaim his freedom and kill again. After the death of her mother, Monica Diaz begins an intense relationship with a boy who is obsessed with becoming a serial killer. The family's threats to break the two teenagers apart results in one of the worst massacres in the history of Los Angeles.

=== Season 3 (LMN) ===
No. overall	No. in season	Title	Original release date
1	37	"Like Father, Like Son & Back For Seconds"	April 21, 2014
Murder of Jeff Hall; Harvey Miguel Robinson
2	38	"Mommie Dearest & Forbidden Love"	April 28, 2014
Murder of Ron Tomich; Murder of Joanne Witt
3	39	"Frenemies & The Reject"	May 5, 2014
Christine Paolilla
4	40	"Allentown Massacre & The Copycat"	May 12, 2014
Two neo-Nazi brothers and their cousin murder their parents and brother in Allentown, Pennsylvania. Days later, a boy in the same town follows their example.
5	41	"For Sandy & Poison Pal"	May 19, 2014
Murder of Sarah and Carl Collier; Murder of Benjamin Vassiliev
6	42	"The Million Dollar Plan & Rattlesnake Romeo"	June 2, 2014
Murder of Alberto Rodriguez Macias; Murder of Vicki Robinson
7	43	"Simon Says & For No Good Reason"	June 9, 2014
An outcast joins a military-style cult of misfit teens who are brainwashed into committing crimes. Two high-school football players share a fantasy of carrying out an armed robbery.
8	44	"Peeping Theodore & The Six"	June 16, 2014
Disappearance of Ann Marie Burr; Lillelid murders
9	45	"Two Strikes & Hail Mary"	June 23, 2014
Murder of Robert Solimine; Murder of Jeremy Rourke
10	46	"I'm So Lonesome I Could Kill & The Bicycle Thief"	June 30, 2014
Jeffrey Dahmer; Murder of Autumn Pasquale
11	47	"No Apparent Motive"	July 7, 2014
The 1997 murder of a family in Washington state is featured along with the 1991 disappearance of two boys in Virginia.
12	48	"Please Kill For Me"	July 14, 2014
A Texas girl convinces two friends to commit a crime. A girl gets her boyfriend to solve her issues with her mother for good.
13	49	"Satan's Disciples"	July 30, 2014
Kszepka family murders; Murder of Kimberly Jo Dotts
14	50	"Jealousy"	July 30, 2014
Murder of Shanda Sharer
15	51	"Ticking Time Bomb"	August 6, 2014
16	52	"The Breaking Point"	August 13, 2014
In 1992, a young girl murders her mother.
17	53	"Raging Hormones"	August 18, 2014
18	54	"Dangerously In Love"	August 20, 2014
19	55	"All In The Family"	August 27, 2014
20	56	"Out Of Control"	August 27, 2014
21	57	"Deadly Compulsion"	September 3, 2014
Brenda Spencer, 16, opens fire on an elementary from her bedroom window, killing 2 men and wounding 9 others in 1979. In 2007, Alec Devon Kreider, 16, kills a close friend and both his parents.

=== Season 4 (LMN) ===
No. overall	No. in season	Title	Original release date
1	58	"Stand Out & It Runs in the Family"	December 10, 2014
A hometown hero is connected to the murder of a Montana business owner. John Olson is shot in the same town a day later.
2	59	"Knight in Shining Armor & Are You Trying to Seduce Me?"	December 17, 2014
Danielle Black murders her father in Hagerstown, Maryland. The husband of a woman having an affair with a teen is found shot dead in the doorway of his home.
3	60	"Crazy Love & Double Vision"	January 14, 2015
Infidelity leads teen lovers down a twisted path. A mother of identical twin daughters is brutally murdered in Georgia.
4	61	"Assassin & The Matrix Kid"	January 14, 2015
A young couple are murdered execution-style in a Chicago suburb. A teen boy descends into a state of mental confusion and becomes obsessed with a violent movie character and violent video games.
5	62	"Southern Belle From Hell & My Best Friend's Girl"	January 21, 2015
The body of a female Job Corps student is discovered on the University of Tennessee campus in Knoxville. A young man goes missing in Fresno, Texas, and his mother refuses to give up finding him.
6	63	"Pop and Circumstance & Shell Shocked"	January 21, 2015
Six people are murdered by Scott Moody in two adjacent farmhouses in Ohio. The body of a 9-year-old girl is found in a burning abandoned building in Philadelphia.
7	64	"Good vs. Evil & The Good Son"	January 28, 2015
The death of 16-year-old Jacob Hendershot in Florida is investigated. A son exhibits disturbing signs and erupts in a frenzy of violence.
8	65	"Vampire & The Essay"	February 18, 2015
A group's fantasy of being vampires turns bloody when they pick up a teen girl on their way to New Orleans. A homicide involving a teen, his hippie mother and criminal father.
9	66	"Full Metal Jacket & Mommy Issues"	February 25, 2015
Four members of a New Jersey family are brutally murdered. A routine car accident in Florida leads police to the scene of a double homicide hundreds of miles away.
10	67	"Ready, Set, Action & What Happens in Vegas"	March 4, 2015
A girl falls victim to two high school classmates. A Las Vegas teen tries to break away from a group of kids who want to become mobsters.
11	68	"The One Percent and Why Not?"	March 11, 2015
A 17-year-old boy arrested for murder is released on bail and then lashes out at his own siblings. 17-year-old Tyler Hadley turns violent toward his parents.
12	69	"Rumors and The To Do List"	March 18, 2015
A teen experiencing early onset schizophrenia decides that it is his mission to kill everyone in the world, starting with his best friend. A cheerleader turns up dead and the locals wonder why the mostly likely culprit has an airtight alibi.
13	70	"Tattle Tale Terror & Army Brat"	March 25, 2015
Disapproving parents meet the irresistible force of teenage love. A girl joins a gang that soon loses control.
