= Ellis Rubin =

American lawyer (1925–2006)

Ellis S. Rubin
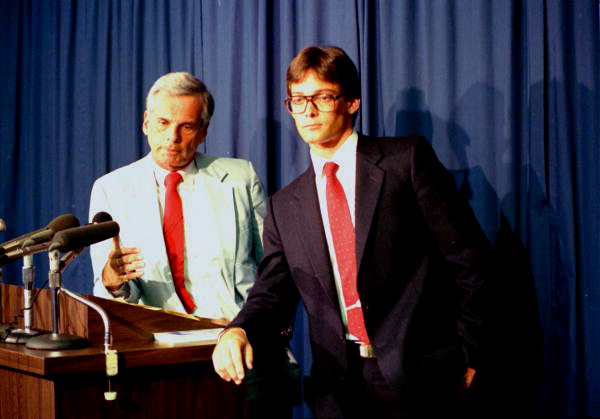
- Ellis Rubin and client, 1980
- Born: June 20, 1925; Syracuse, New York, U.S.
- Died: December 12, 2006 (aged 81); Miami, Florida, U.S.
- Education: College of the Holy Cross (BA); University of Miami (LLB)
- Occupation: Defense attorney
- Known for: Creative and original defense tactics

Ellis S. Rubin (June 20, 1925 – December 12, 2006) was an American attorney who gained national fame for handling a variety of highly publicized cases in a legal career that spanned 53 years. He was famous for his innovative defenses and his propensity for handling lost causes. Rubin won the first case in Florida using the "battered woman" defense. He also worked to free a man, James Joseph Richardson, who had been wrongly imprisoned for 21 years for fatally poisoning his seven children, and created the nymphomania defense in a case involving prostitution.

The Washington Post characterized Rubin as "a Miami lawyer with an affection for the disenfranchised and an outsized knack for publicity in the tradition of P. T. Barnum [... who] capitalized on the flamboyant characters and outrageous crimes endemic to South Florida to present innovative and often unprecedented legal defenses." His tactics were often controversial. Judge Wayne L. Cobb, who handled the case of a confessed serial killer whom Rubin was defending in 1993, said Rubin was "famous for his psychobabble defenses". Throughout his career he took on over 5,000 civil and criminal cases.

== Early life and education ==
Rubin was born in Syracuse, New York, and was raised in Binghamton, New York. He served as an officer in the Navy in World War II, graduated from the College of the Holy Cross, and then received a law degree in 1951 from the University of Miami School of Law. He was admitted to the bar to practice law in Florida and before the United States Supreme Court. Rubin was the namesake of his law firm, Rubin & Rubin, which started in 1951 and continues today.

== Career ==
During the 1950s, he worked for the state attorney general's office as a special Assistant Attorney General investigating communism, and was asked to establish a policy for dealing with "subversive activities" in Florida. In 1955, he published a "red book" on the communist movement in Florida, which provoked a bill in the Florida Legislature giving investigators of subversive activities wide subpoena powers, the right to hold secret hearings, and to offer witnesses immunity. In the 1960s he argued against racial discrimination in religious schools before the United States Supreme Court. In the 1970s he led protests against the use of school busing as a solution for desegregation.

In 1972, Rubin led Miami Beach homeowners in opposition to a plan hatched by Jerry Rubin and the Yippies to occupy the municipal golf courses for housing for protestors at the Democratic and Republican Conventions. On June 4, 1972, the Rubins debated at the Unitarian Church in Miami, in front of 500 highly charged churchgoers on both sides of the issue, only divided by a church aisle. Jerry began the debate by thanking "Uncle Ellis" for the invitation to debate. Ellis, who was not related to Jerry, feigned disgust at the association and the event was "on". After barbs in both directions, it ended abruptly when Jerry famously dropped an "F-bomb" and Ellis took leave to lead the locals out in a protest of their own.

His first widely publicized case was the nationally televised Ronny Zamora trial in which he used the innovative "TV Intoxication" defense. He continued trying variety of cases with eye-catching headlines. However, he also handled low keyed cases, many pro bono, making it clear that money-making was not his goal. His politics changed with the times. For example, he supported Anita Bryant's anti-gay rights crusade in the 1970s, but later became a strong advocate for gay rights, having decided he was wrong, filing six lawsuits by 2004 challenging Florida's ban on gay marriage.

=== Political campaigns ===
Rubin ran unsuccessfully for public offices such as governor, attorney general, congress, and the U.S. senate, more than a dozen times; but his intent was to develop a platform for discussion of difficult issues of the time. While he was not taken seriously as a contender and never won, his voice was heard in influencing the agendas of his opponents.

=== Famous cases ===
Ronny Zamora

When Rubin defended 15-year-old Ronny Zamora in 1977, for the murder of his 83-year-old neighbor in her Miami Beach home in a robbery, the trial was one of the first ever nationally televised. Zamora's defense was that he was intoxicated by violence on television. The defense became known as the "TV Intoxication" defense; Zamora claimed he could not tell the difference between fantasy and reality because of his obsession with Kojak and other violent shows since the age of five.

Rubin tried unsuccessfully to provide evidence of the damaging effect of TV on young minds by issuing subpoenas to actor Telly Savalas, star of Kojak, and to nationally known experts on the relationship between violence and television. After Zamora was convicted and sentenced to life, he unsuccessfully appealed his sentence, blaming Rubin for the TV intoxication defense which he claimed had made a joke of his trial. The federal appeals court ruled that evidence against Zamora was overwhelming and that Rubin had made the best of a weak case; the defense had in fact helped Zamora by focusing attention on Zamora's deprived background. Zamora was released from prison in 2004 after having served 27 years in prison. A Costa Rican national, Zamora was repatriated to that country.

TV blackouts of soldout sporting events

Beginning in the late 60s as college and NFL football was becoming more popular on television, the broadcasts were traditionally locally blacked out to encourage fans to purchase tickets to the games. Rubin, first fought to lift the blackout of the Orange Bowl Game by jogging from the outside distance of the blackout radius, 75 miles, in Palm Beach, Florida, down US Hwy 1, to Miami, gathering signatures on petitions for presentation to the City of Miami Commissioners in hopes that they would voluntarily lift the blackout of the Orange Bowl Game. While initially unsuccessful, eventually, through public pressure and media attention, in April 1970, the Orange Bowl Committee agreed to voluntarily lift the blackout.

Having won a victory once thought impossible, Rubin set his sights on the NFL and its commissioner Pete Rozelle. He unsuccessfully fought to lift TV Blackouts in New Orleans, Los Angeles and Miami before he was able to bring the issue before the US Congress in the form of a challenge to the Sherman Anti-Trust Act. Rubin was able to collaborate with Senator William Proxmire, who was Chairman of the Anti-Trust Committee, and couldn't get his own ticket to the Washington Redskins games. Together, they were able to bring pressure on Rozelle and the other owners of the NFL, to create what became known as the 72 Hour Blackout Rule. Throughout the fight, Rubin had filed over a dozen lawsuits against the NFL and various NFL Teams but in the end, the TV Blackouts were eventually lifted.

Bobby Joe Long

In July 1986, serial killer Bobbie Joe Long announced that Rubin had agreed to become his new court-appointed attorney for the sentencing hearing for Long's conviction for the Simms murder. At the hearing, Rubin shocked the courtroom by introducing Long's confession to a tenth murder in March 1984. Rubin's tactic was to portray Long as a mentally ill man who needed help rather than the death penalty.

Rubin also introduced new evidence of Long's childhood exposure to pornography, sleeping with his mother until he was thirteen and seeing her have sex with other men. These experiences, Rubin said, were responsible for Long's perverted adult sexuality. Rubin also presented evidence of Long's head injuries as a child and young adult to support his defense that Long was predisposed to murder due to irresistible impulses. However, the jury voted eleven to one in favor of the death penalty.

Rubin handled some of the numerous appeals for Bobbie Joe Long, who was arrested in 1985 but who has engaged in a series of appeals involving numerous jurisdictions and agencies. Long was executed by lethal injection on May 23, 2019.

Contempt of court

In 1984–1985, Russell Sanborn was charged with first degree murder. Sanborn was represented by three attorneys at different times, each of whom withdrew from the case. Sanborn's mother, a fruit peddler, asked Rubin to represent Sanborn pro bono. Rubin entered the case and was prepared for trial however on the date of the trial, Rubin petitioned the court to withdraw, implying strongly that Sanborn was planning to give false testimony and he would not defend a client who would lie on the stand. His petition was denied, and Rubin sought certiorari by the Third District Court of Appeal, which also denied the petition. When the case was rescheduled, Rubin again sought to withdraw on the same grounds and again was denied and ordered to proceed to trial. When he again refused, the court issued a contempt order (affirmed on appeal in Rubin v. State) denying review of the district court decision and denying Rubin's petition for a writ of habeas corpus, Rubin was ordered to serve 37 days in jail for contempt of court.

Rubin, through his son and law partner, I. Mark Rubin, brought the case to the Supreme Court, but the matter had already been settled by Rubin having served his jail time for refusing to represent a client who wanted to lie on the witness stand. When he emerged from jail, he had grown a beard which he called, "my badge of courage", as it became his trademark throughout the rest of his career.

Jeff and Kathy Willets

Another high-profile case was his defense of Katherine and Jeffrey Willets in 1991. The Willetses were accused of operating a sex business out of their home. Rubin argued in their defense that Kathy Willets was driven to prostitution by nymphomania brought on by side-effects of the antidepressant, Prozac, forcing her to need sex with as many as eight men daily. Her husband, a deputy sheriff, was impotent and videotaped his wife's sex acts as a form of therapy. Despite this original defense, both were convicted. The lawyer for the prosecution was Joel T. Lazarus, who shortly afterward was appointed a judge.

Lionel Tate

Rubin was hired as the fourth attorney for Lionel Tate, who at that time was on probation for the murder of six-year-old Tiffany Eunick in 1999 when he was 12.

As Rubin portrayed the scenario, Tate, a fan of professional wrestling, was only imitating the sport's body slams when he accidentally killed Eunick. Tate was convicted of first-degree murder and received a life sentence in 2001. His conviction received worldwide attention as the youngest American ever sentenced to life in prison. His conviction was overturned upon appeal and Rubin entered a plea agreement that freed Tate in January 2004.

In 2005, Rubin agreed to defend Tate on charges of robbery of a pizza delivery man. Tate pleaded guilty to armed robbery in a deal that spared him a life sentence for violating probation. Rubin threatened to resign from the case, after Tate, without informing Rubin, wrote a letter to the judge trying to retract a plea bargain, a bargain that would have removed the possibility of two life sentences. Simultaneously, Tate claimed his mother physically abused him and that he was now suffering flashbacks and posttraumatic stress disorder. This case was described as "like a soap opera" by a television reporter.

On March 1, 2006, Rubin was the defense attorney in Tate's pizza robbery trial. In April 2007, Tate filed a motion to have his 30-year sentence vacated on the grounds that his former attorney (now deceased), Ellis Rubin, was incompetent.

Same sex marriage

Rubin, who initially supported Anita Bryant's anti-gay crusade in the 1970s, later became a strong advocate for gay rights. He filed a lawsuit in Federal court under the Defense of Marriage Act to attain recognition of a lesbian couple's Canadian marriage.

By 2004, Rubin had filed six same-sex-couple lawsuits, four in Florida state courts, and two challenging federal same-sex marriage laws. Rubin was initially criticized for his aggressive "scorched-earth" tactics. Restrictions on same sex marriages were not lifted by state courts until 2014.

Other cases

Sample of other cases:

- Lisa Faye Keller vs. State of Florida (1986) – Defendant bludgeoned her 70-year-old father to death outside his condominium, September 1986.
- Virginia Barrett vs. Port St. Lucie Sheriff Office (1997) – Mother's suit against Port St. Lucie Sheriff's Office for the death of her son Anderson Tate Jr. on December 4, 1996, while he was in custody at the St. Lucie County jail.
- Amiee Lee Weiss vs. State of Florida (2002) – Teenager tried on charges that she killed her newborn son, stuffed him in a backpack, and dumped him in a canal.
- Gorman Roberts vs. State of Florida (2002) – Charged with pushing 5-year-old boy into a canal after the boy slipped out of his home in February 2002.
- "Rubin represented the parents in the so-called 'Vegan Baby Death' (2005) who were accused of aggravated manslaughter. Their five-month-old infant allegedly died of malnutrition, being fed only wheat grass, coconut water, and almond milk. They were acquitted of those charges but convicted of four counts of child neglect
- "Frank Valdez, an inmate on Florida's Death Row" was killed by his guards. Rubin represented his family for his wrongful death. The case led to an investigation by the FBI into the Florida Prison System.
- "Rubin represented Kendall Truitt", a United States Navy sailor investigated by the Navy in connection with the USS Iowa turret explosion. Leaks to the media by the Navy and the Navy's Naval Investigative Service implied that Truitt had a homosexual relationship with another sailor, Clayton Hartwig, and may have assisted in or caused the intentional detonation of the battleship's gun turret. After Rubin began representing Truitt, the Navy backed off of its insinuations against Truitt.

== Death ==
Ellis Rubin died, aged 81, at his Miami home following a battle with cancer. In addition to his wife, Barbara Storer, he was survived by four children and seven grandchildren.

== See also ==
- List of U.S. state laws on same-sex unions

Party political offices
Vacant Title last held by Carl V. Wisner, Jr.	Republican nominee for Florida Attorney General; 1966	Succeeded by Thom Rumberger
