= Lin family murders =

Lin family murders may refer to:

- Lin family murders (Australia), a family murder in Australia in 2009
- Lin Yi-hsiung#Lin family massacre, a family murder in Taiwan in 1980
