= Kenneth Padowitz =

American attorney and legal analyst (born 1960)

- Born: November 25, 1960 (age 65); Mineola, New York
- Education: University of Florida; Nova Southeastern University
- Occupations: Lawyer, Professor
- Organization(s): Kenneth Padowitz, P.A.

Kenneth David Padowitz (born 25 November 1960) is an American attorney, legal analyst, and former law professor based in Florida. He is known for his work as both a prosecutor and a criminal defense attorney in high-profile cases. Padowitz served as an assistant state attorney in Broward County, where he was lead prosecutor in several prominent trials, including the murder case of Lionel Tate, which attracted widespread media coverage. He is also recognized as the first attorney to introduce computer-animated forensic reconstruction as evidence in a Florida criminal court.

After leaving the state attorney's office, Padowitz founded a private practice specializing in criminal defense. He has also appeared frequently in the media as a legal commentator.

== Early life ==
Kenneth Padowitz was born in Mineola, New York and moved to Florida with his family at the age of 14. He graduated from Piper High School and attended the University of Florida, where he earned a bachelor's degree in education. Padowitz later attended Nova Southeastern University's Shepard Broad Law Center, where he received his Juris Doctor degree in 1986.

== Career ==
Padowitz began his legal career in 1986 at the Broward County State Attorney's Office, serving as an assistant state attorney for 16 years. He was promoted to the homicide division, where he served as a lead prosecutor. During his tenure, he prosecuted more than 300 jury trials, including over 35 first-degree murder cases and approximately 50 grand jury presentations.

Among the high-profile cases he handled was that of Lionel Tate, a 12-year-old charged as an adult with first-degree murder. Padowitz was also the prosecutor in the case against Kenneth Pierce, a man convicted in a fatal hit-and-run. In the Pierce case, Padowitz was the first attorney to introduce computer-animated forensic reconstruction as a form of evidence in a Florida courtroom, a use that was later upheld on appeal.

In 2002, Padowitz left the State Attorney's Office and transitioned to private practice. He founded the Law Offices of Kenneth Padowitz, P.A., where he began working as a criminal defense attorney. His practice handled a range of felony and misdemeanor cases.

In 2017, Padowitz represented Richard Patterson, a Margate man charged with second-degree murder in the death of his girlfriend. The case received national media attention due to the unusual nature of the defense, and Patterson was ultimately acquitted at trial. In a 2024 stand-your-ground case involving defendant Miguel Albisu, Padowitz became the first attorney in the United States to successfully introduce virtual reality evidence during a criminal hearing. A Florida judge used a VR headset in court to view a 3D recreation of the events from the defendant's perspective. The case was widely reported and cited as a milestone in the courtroom use of immersive technology.

He is also a long-time adjunct law professor at Nova Southeastern University's Shepard Broad College of Law, where he has taught courses on trial advocacy and scientific evidence for 17 years. He has frequently appeared as a legal analyst on various national television networks, including CNN, Fox News, and local news stations, offering insights on high-profile criminal cases.

== Personal life ==
Padowitz has been involved in several community and professional organizations, including a term as the Chairman of a Grievance Committee for the Florida Bar. He has a son, Joshua Padowitz, who is also an attorney at his law firm.

== Recognition ==
- Super Lawyer by Thomson Reuters
- "AV Preeminent" rating from Martindale-Hubbell
- Listed as Best Lawyers in America and Florida Trend's "Legal Elite"
- Included in The National Trial Lawyers: Top 100
