= Sharpe family murders =

Australian double murder (2004)

- The family: Anna, John and Gracie
- Date: 23–27 March 2004
- Location: Mornington, Victoria, Australia
- Cause: Shootings by spear gun
- Deaths: Anna Kemp; Gracie Kemp
- Convicted: John Myles Sharpe
- Convictions: Two counts of murder
- Sentence: Two sentences of life imprisonment with a minimum non-parole period of 33 years

The Sharpe family murders refer to an Australian 2004 double murder.

Australian man John Myles Sharpe killed his pregnant wife, New Zealander Anna Marie Kemp, and their 20-month-old daughter, Gracie Louise Kemp, in the semi-rural Melbourne suburb of Mornington, in March 2004. Authorities say Sharpe repeatedly fired a speargun into the heads of his victims, later exhumed the body of his wife from a shallow grave, dismembered her, then disposed of her body in a landfill.

Sharpe later appeared in emotional interviews on television seeking information on his family's whereabouts. He eventually confessed to the murders and was sentenced in 2005 to two consecutive terms of life imprisonment, with a non-parole period of thirty-three years. He will be eligible for parole in 2037.

== Background ==
John Sharpe was born 28 February 1967 in Mornington, Victoria, where he also grew up. He met his New Zealand-born wife, Anna Kemp, when they worked together at the Commonwealth Bank. They married in October 1994 and lived together in various locations around the Mornington Peninsula area south of Melbourne. At the time of the murders, Sharpe was self-employed as a conveyancer. Their daughter, Gracie, was born in August 2002. Gracie was born with a condition called hip dysplasia, a congenital abnormality in her hips which required orthopaedic treatment by a corrective harness for the first three months of her life. She cried often and had difficulty sleeping, a situation which appeared to place some strain on the marriage. Even after the harness was no longer required, Gracie still had difficulties with feeding and sleeping, for which Kemp sought professional assistance. During the time of the murders and subsequent investigations and later criminal proceedings Sharpe’s conveyancing business was operating only being closed and taken over by an overseeing solicitor after his imprisonment.

In 2003, Sharpe purchased a high-powered speargun and an additional spear at Sport Philip Marine, a local shop in Mornington. He had not previously shown an interest in spearfishing. Sharpe practised firing the speargun in the backyard of the couple's residence in order to become familiar with its operation. Later that year, the Sharpes purchased a house at 116 Prince Street, Mornington. In November 2003, when Gracie was about fifteen months old, Kemp became pregnant again. Sharpe later told police investigators that this pregnancy came as a surprise to him. He apparently decided that he did not want another child—in his mind, one was enough of a burden—and he began to resent Kemp and the unborn child.

== Murders ==
On 21 March 2004, Sharpe and his family attended a nephew's birthday party. Others present at the party noticed no tension or arguments between the couple. On 23 March, according to Sharpe’s confession, the couple both retired to bed for the night between 9:00-10:00pm after an argument; Anna quickly fell asleep, while Sharpe lay brooding over the argument and the state of his marriage. Sharpe left the bed and retrieved the speargun from the backyard garage. Returning to the bedroom, he fired the spear from a distance of a few centimetres into his wife's left temple. Noticing his wife was still breathing, Sharpe fired a second spear into her head, killing her. He then covered the body in towels and went downstairs to sleep on a sofa bed.

The next day, Sharpe attempted to remove the spears but failed, removing only the shafts by unscrewing them from the heads. That same day, he took Gracie to, and then collected her from, her childcare centre. Sharpe turned away a TV serviceman who came to the house, lest he discover the body. He later buried his wife in a shallow grave in their backyard.

Some time after his wife's death, Sharpe returned to Sport Phillip Marine with his daughter and purchased another spear that would later be used to kill the child. This was described at his sentencing hearing as being "circumstances of unspeakable callousness.”

In the following days, Sharpe told staff at Gracie's childcare centre that Kemp had left him and told Kemp's mother in New Zealand that Kemp had left him for a man with whom she had been having an extramarital affair. He said he did not know her current whereabouts but that she would return in a few days to collect Gracie.

On 27 March 2004, Sharpe put his daughter Gracie to bed in her cot and then drank several glasses of whiskey and Coke in order to "numb his senses," he later said. He retrieved the speargun from the garage, loaded it with the newly acquired spear, and fired at his daughter's head, penetrating her skull. With his child wounded and screaming loudly, Sharpe retrieved the two spear shafts which he had earlier removed from his wife's head and returned to the bedroom. He fired both into Gracie's head, but she was still alive, so he withdrew one spear and fired it again, finally killing her. Sharpe returned to her bedroom the next morning and pulled the spears from her head.

He then wrapped her body in garbage bags and a tarpaulin and disposed of her body at the Mornington refuse transfer station. At the same time he discarded the speargun, the spears, and some of Gracie's clothes and toys.

=== Aftermath ===
On 29 March 2004, Sharpe visited a local Bunnings hardware store in Frankston, where he purchased a roll of duct tape, two tarpaulins, and an electric chainsaw. The following day, he exhumed Kemp’s body and cut it into three pieces. He then wrapped the remains in a tarpaulin and disposed of them, along with the chainsaw, in waste collection bins at the Mornington transfer station. On the same day, he sent a forged e-mail to Kemp's family in New Zealand to create the impression she was alive and well. Rather than comfort the family, Sharpe's e-mail raised further concerns, and Kemp's mother reported her disappearance to police in Dunedin. Sharpe told police that Kemp had moved to the nearby Melbourne suburb of Chelsea with their daughter, and denied any knowledge of or involvement in her disappearance. He also arranged for flowers in Kemp's name to be delivered to his mother-in-law on her birthday.

During May 2004, Sharpe gave several media interviews, appearing on national television to speak of his wife and child's disappearance. His strange behaviour attracted attention. In part of his appeal he said: "Anna, our marriage may be over but I still love you and you are the mother of our beautiful daughter Gracie, whom we both adore more than anyone else". Sharpe then said he had spoken to his wife a week earlier and he asked for anyone with information to come forward. However, he also maintained that she had run off with another man.

Sharpe's use of the past tense also aroused police suspicion that Kemp and Gracie were both dead.

== Arrest and conviction ==
On 20 May 2004, New Zealand Police requested Victoria Police conduct enquiries into the disappearance of Kemp and Gracie. The same day, police from Mornington spoke with Sharpe. The family was shocked by Sharpe‘s assertion that Kemp, a devout Catholic, would have an affair, and were sceptical that she had not taken Gracie with her initially, something her closest friends and family all agreed she would never do. After receiving e-mails and flowers purported to be from Kemp without any telephone contact, the family suspected that Sharpe was deceiving them. Sharpe also used Kemp's phone and ATM card on several occasions throughout the southeastern suburbs of Victoria to create the impression she was alive and well.

On 10 June, Sharpe was again interviewed by police in Mornington but maintained that Kemp had left voluntarily on 23 March. However, investigators were unconvinced by his story and lack of emotion. Police kept Sharpe under surveillance and witnessed him retrieving Kemp's phone and ATM cards from a hiding place at a public bathroom in Mornington, as well as dumping potential evidence in a bin in Mount Martha.

On 22 June 2004, police arrested Sharpe and interviewed him twice: during his first interview, he continued to deny any knowledge of their whereabouts, but during the second, having spoken to his family, he admitted to both murders.

He told police he killed his wife because she was "controlling and moody" and their marriage was unhappy. He also told police he "was thinking of taking care of Gracie by myself and just amongst all this madness ... that's when I lost the plot". According to some family members, Sharpe may have killed his wife because she discovered he had abused Gracie, but this has not been substantiated.

Police undertook an extensive search lasting three weeks of the Mornington landfill site, and eventually recovered both bodies. As some time had passed, their remains were scattered across several areas of the refuse station. Both were buried in Green Park Cemetery, Dunedin, under Kemp's maiden name, along with mention of her unborn son, Francis.

Sharpe appeared in the Supreme Court of Victoria where he was arraigned and pleaded guilty to the murders. On 5 August 2005, the Court sentenced Sharpe to two consecutive terms of life imprisonment, with a non-parole period of 33 years. Sharpe resides in protective custody while incarcerated, due to threats on his life from fellow prisoners.

== Media coverage ==
The stages of the Sharpe case were all major news items in the Australian print and television media of the time. The murder also received general media attention in New Zealand, and sparked the interest of the New Zealand Police. Some examples include:

- Crime Investigation Australia Season 1 episode "The Mornington Monster" (aired 2005) in which the crimes and Sharpe's actions were re-enacted.
- 12 True Crime Stories that Shocked Australia (2005) by Paul Anderson
- Criminal Profiling: An Introduction to Behavioral Evidence Analysis (2008) by Brent E. Turvey.
- 60 Minutes episode "Unmasking the Truth" (aired August 2009) about human lie detectors who can unmask killers "tearfully pleading for help in finding a missing loved one. And all the time, they know their husband, wife, even their own child, is already dead."
- Why Did They Do It? Inside the Minds of Australia's Most Unlikely Killers (2015) which explores Sharpe's pathology, particularly his avoidant personality disorder.
- Australian True Crime – Case 11 (May 2017); Case 21 (August 2017)

== See also ==
- Crime in Australia
- List of Australian criminals
- Timeline of major crimes in Australia
- Lin family murders (Australia)
- Sef Gonzales
