= Lin family murders (Australia) =

2009 murders in North Epping, Australia

- Location: North Epping, New South Wales, Australia
- Date: 18 July 2009; 17 years ago
- Attack type: Mass murder
- Weapon: Hammer
- Deaths: 5 (Min Lin, Yun Lin, Irene Lin, Henry Lin, Terry Lin)
- Perpetrator: Lian Bin "Robert" Xie

The Lin family murders occurred in North Epping in the northwestern suburbs of Sydney, New South Wales, Australia, on 18 July 2009. The victims were newsagency proprietor Min Lin; his wife, Yun Lin; their sons, Henry and Terry; and Yun Lin's sister, Irene Lin. The family was bludgeoned to death. Min Lin's sister, Kathy, discovered the bodies. Jun "Brenda" Lin, 15, was the only surviving immediate family member after the incident; she was on a school trip in New Caledonia with Cheltenham Girls High School at the time.

On 5 May 2011, Lian Bin "Robert" Xie – Kathy's husband – was arrested and charged with the murders. After several abandoned trials, a third trial ended in December 2015 with a hung jury. Xie was later granted bail. A retrial was held in 2016, with a jury finding Xie guilty of the murders by a majority verdict on 12 January 2017.

== Murders ==
In the early hours of 18 July 2009 in North Epping, New South Wales, newsagent proprietor Min Lin, age 45; his wife, Yun Lin, 43; their sons, Henry (12) and Terry (9); and Yun Lin's sister, Irene Lin (39), were bludgeoned to death. Kathy Lin, sister of Min Lin, and her husband Lian Bin "Robert" Xie discovered the bodies when they went to the house at around 9:00 am to see why the newsagency run by the Lin family was not open. After entering via the unlocked front door and discovering the murder scene, Kathy called 000 for an ambulance and struggled to explain the situation. Xie left Kathy at the house waiting for the police to pick up Min and Kathy Lin's parents, who lived in Merrylands. Police and paramedics quickly arrived at the scene, but the victims were pronounced dead. A public memorial service was held on August 8 at Badgery Pavilion for all the victims.

== Investigation ==
Police investigators noted heavy blood spatter from floor to ceiling. The faces of the victims were so disfigured that forensic analysis had to be used to identify them. There was no evidence of a break-in, suggesting the use of a key. Nothing had been ransacked or stolen. It was clear that the killer had known the layout of the house, the location of the circuit breaker, and the fact that Brenda Lin was not home, as it appeared that the attacker did not enter her room. Forensic analysts also determined that the killings had been started with a hammer-like object, alleged at trial to have been bought from a discount store, and four of the five victims had additional signs of asphyxia. There were twenty-four bloody shoe prints that were also evident, determined to be around US-size 8.5 to 10.5, indicating a lone attacker.

Brenda (then 15) was the only member of the immediate family to survive. She was on a year-10 French school trip in New Caledonia with Cheltenham Girls High School at the time, and learnt of the murders via Facebook. After the murders, Xie and Kathy Lin became her legal guardians, and they resumed operation of the newsagent business. Brenda later alleged that she was sexually abused by Xie during this period.

A month after the attack, Strike Force Norburn was set up to coordinate the investigation. In May 2010, the NSW Crime Commission told Kathy about the discovery of shoe prints that may match an ASICS sneaker. Subsequently, video collected during six-month-long covert police surveillance showed Xie cutting up a size 9.5 ASICS sneakers box and flushing it down a toilet. It was also found that Xie cleaned his garage on the morning of the murders. Forensic investigators searched his home and found a stain on the floor of the garage, which the Crown prosecutor alleged was blood. Later analysis of "stain 91" by Cybergenetics, a US company, revealed it to contain DNA from four of the five victims.

== Trials ==
Just after 9:00 am on 5 May 2011, Xie (then 47) was arrested without incident at his home in North Epping following an extensive investigation. On 19 December 2012, he was committed for trial. Xie's trial had been scheduled to begin in September 2013. DNA tests on some evidence were in the process of being completed. Authorities alleged the motive for the crime was that, while Xie had been an ENT doctor in China before migrating to Melbourne in 2006, he had made an unsuccessful attempt to open a restaurant there before relocating to Sydney. Xie felt slighted by his loss of status and face when compared to his successful in-laws. He was also sexually attracted to his underage niece, Brenda Lin.

On 22 July 2013, the Supreme Court of New South Wales delayed the trial until 17 March 2014. This was agreed between the prosecution and the defence, although press reports were not able to comment on the reasons for the delay. On 20 May and 21 May 2014, in the Supreme Court, Min and Kathy Lin's father, Yang Fei Lin, described his horror at learning that the five family members were dead.

Xie's second trial for the murders began in August 2014, but was abandoned again shortly thereafter in September due to health issues of the trial judge.

Xie's third trial commenced in February 2015. Xie, who had been refused bail ahead of the trial, pleaded not guilty. Robert Xie's defence lawyers argued that the injuries inflicted upon the family members indicated that the murders were committed by more than one person. On 1 December 2015, after a nine-month trial and eleven days of deliberation, two separate notes from the jury of twelve indicated they were unable to reach a verdict. An agreement still could not be reached after a direction from presiding Justice Elizabeth Fullerton indicating that she would accept a majority verdict of eleven to one. Fullerton formally discharged the jury on 1 December. The date for a retrial was initially undecided, but then confirmed for August 2016. Xie was granted bail on 8 December 2015.

The final trial commenced in Sydney in June 2016. As in the previous trial, the jury was unable to reach a unanimous verdict, and Justice Fullerton advised a majority (11 to 1) verdict would be accepted by the court. On 12 January 2017, a jury found Xie guilty of five counts of murder. Xie was sentenced on 13 February 2017 to five consecutive life sentences in prison without the possibility of parole. An appeal against the conviction was dismissed in February 2021.

== Aftermath ==
It was reported in May 2024 that Brenda Lin was now an advocate for survivors of sexual abuse. Since 2021, Lin had helped to established a network of 12 meetup hubs, The Survivor Network, in Australia to assist other victims in their recovery process.

== See also ==
- Freeman family murders
- Gonzales family murders
- Haysom family murders
- Lillelid family murders
- Menendez family murders
- Richardson family murders
- Richthofen family murders
- Sharpe family murders
- Watts family murders
