= Hamilton Correctional Institution =

State prison in Hamilton County, Florida, USA

Coordinates: 30°30′14″N 82°57′48″W

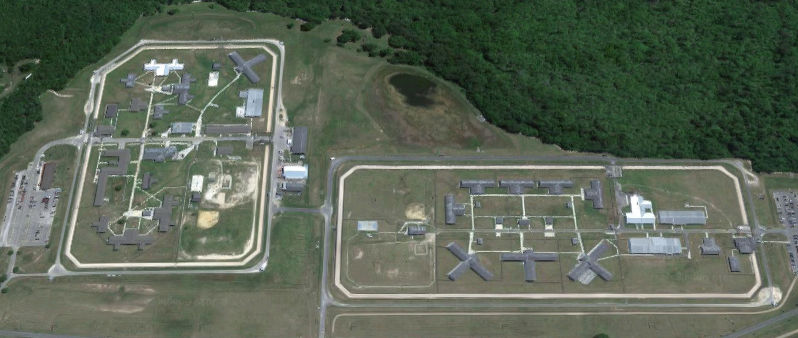
- Aerial view of HAMCI
- Interactive map of Hamilton Correctional Institution
- Location: 10650 SW 46th Street Jasper, Florida
- Status: Operational
- Security class: Minimum, medium, and close
- Capacity: 2,808 = 1,257 (main unit) + 1,551 (in Annex)
- Population: 2,123 = 647 (main unit) + 1,476 (in Annex) (May 2025)
- Opened: 1987
- Managed by: Florida Department of Corrections

The Hamilton Correctional Institution (HAMCI) is a state prison for men located in Jasper, Hamilton County, Florida, owned and operated by the Florida Department of Corrections. This facility has a mix of security levels, including minimum, medium, and close. Hamilton first opened in 1987 and has a maximum capacity of 1,257 prisoners.

The adjacent Hamilton Annex opened in 1995 with a maximum capacity of 1,551 inmates.

== Notable Inmates ==
- Lionel Tate - murderer and the youngest person in U.S. history to be sentenced to life imprisonment without parole
