= State Correctional Institution – Coal Township =

American prison in Coal Township, Pennsylvania

Coordinates: 40°48′22″N 76°33′08″W

- Interactive map of State Correctional Institution – Coal Township
- Location: Coal Township, Northumberland County, near Shamokin, Pennsylvania, USA
- Security class: Medium-Security
- Capacity: 2,153
- Opened: April 26, 1993
- Managed by: Pennsylvania Department of Corrections

The State Correctional Institution – Coal Township, commonly referred to as SCI Coal Township, is a Pennsylvania Department of Corrections prison. Thomas McGinley is its superintendent. SCI Coal Township houses about 2,300 inmates.

== History ==
The State Correctional Institution – Coal Township was officially dedicated on April 26, 1993, as part of Governor Robert P. Casey's Operation Jump Start program, which launched in 1990 to relieve overcrowding in Pennsylvania's prisons while stimulating job growth and economic activity in struggling communities. SCI Coal Township was one of five prototypical state prisons constructed during this expansion and was financed through county or municipal authorities rather than direct state funding. The Northumberland County Authority managed the construction financing and developed a lease-to-buy agreement with the Department of Corrections.

The choice of Coal Township as a site was significant because of the region's long-standing identity as part of Pennsylvania's anthracite coal belt. For more than a century, Shamokin and Coal Township were central to the anthracite industry, drawing thousands of immigrant laborers from Europe in the late 19th and early 20th centuries. At its peak in the 1920s, Shamokin and the surrounding coal patch communities were home to nearly 50,000 residents, with the local economy, culture, and even social life revolving around the mines and collieries. The decline of anthracite demand in the mid-20th century, however, left the region with steep economic challenges, including depopulation, unemployment, and disinvestment.

By the late 1980s, many of the large collieries had closed, and Shamokin had lost a significant share of its population and tax base. The siting of SCI Coal Township was therefore viewed as both a practical response to statewide prison overcrowding and a form of regional economic redevelopment, providing stable government jobs in an area where industrial work had all but disappeared. In this sense, the prison became part of the long arc of Shamokin's economic transformation, from coal-based industry to corrections-based employment.

The institution also pursued professional recognition soon after its opening. In 1996, SCI Coal Township earned accreditation from the American Correctional Association, and it has remained accredited through regular reaccreditation cycles every three years.

== Superintendent Thomas McGinley ==
Thomas ("Tom") McGinley is the superintendent of the State Correctional Institution – Coal Township in Northumberland County, Pennsylvania. He commenced his career with the Pennsylvania Department of Corrections in 1997 as a corrections activities specialist at SCI Coal Township. After serving at SCI Muncy, he returned to Coal Township and was appointed superintendent in 2016. In this role, McGinley has become widely recognized for pairing safety and security with innovative community engagement and philanthropic programs.

Under McGinley's leadership, SCI Coal Township has developed a strong reputation for inmate-led charitable initiatives. Two groups in particular, TriumpH (founded in 1995) and LifeLine (established in 2016), have flourished under his support. Since 2020, these programs have donated nearly $200,000 to over fifty nonprofit organizations. Beneficiaries include local youth mentoring programs, regional United Way chapters, children's hospitals, and community shelters. These efforts not only provide financial support but also instill in participants a sense of responsibility, purpose, and hope for reintegration.

McGinley has been credited with fostering a culture of redemption and community contribution inside the facility. For example, he approved initiatives such as the Mount Carmel public-pool pass program, which allowed inmate groups to donate thousands of dollars annually so that local children could access free or discounted summer pool passes. His support of the Kaupas Summer Camp, which brings Mount Carmel Area students to Bucknell University, is another illustration of his commitment to using corrections resources to improve life well beyond the prison walls.

In addition to charitable work, McGinley has been an advocate for early childhood education as a long-term crime prevention strategy. He has publicly argued that investing in children's social and emotional development provides guidance that helps them grow into responsible citizens, reducing the likelihood of future incarceration. His philosophy emphasizes that public safety is best served not only through secure facilities but also through proactive community building.

Through these efforts, Superintendent McGinley has pushed for community involvement, charitable initiatives, and rehabilitation as parts of his approach to correctional management. Under his leadership, SCI Coal Township has participated in initiatives intended to benefit surrounding communities while providing incarcerated individuals with opportunities to contribute to community efforts.

== Sexual victimization at SCI Coal Township ==
According to a study by the United States Department of Justice released in August 2010, 3.9% of inmates who responded to a survey reported that they had been sexually victimized at the prison.

== Facility makeup ==
At SCI Coal Township there are 226 acres of land, 43 inside of the perimeter. There are 34 operational structures at the facility, including 10 housing units consisting of both cells and dormitory-style housing. One of these units is a Special Needs Unit.

== Capacity and demographics ==
According to the June 2015 Capacity Report issued by the DOC, the population was 2,271, this being 118 beds over capacity of 2,153, meaning that the facility is at 105-1/2 % Capacity. The average age of an inmate at Coal Township is 37 and the institution employs 526 full-time employees.

== Inmate supports ==
At SCI Coal Township, there are a plethora of inmate supports available to them, including:

=== Academic and vocational education ===
The Academic complement at Coal Township includes Learning Support, Adult Basic Education, GED, Business Education, along with ESL. The Vocational Opportunities provided to inmates at SCI Coal Township include Heating, Air Conditioning and Refrigeration (HVAC), Barber, Computer-Aided Drafting/Design (CADD), Automotive, Custodial Maintenance NCCER, OSHA 10, Flaggers course. Furthermore, all vocational classes offer industry-recognized certifications specific to the trade skills taught in the program.

=== Inmate groups and programs ===
There are programs in the domains of Family/Relationship/Self, Sex Offender, Re-Entry, Alcohol and Other Drug (AOD), Offense Related, along with Mental Health Programs.

=== Outside opportunities for inmates, families and surrounding residents ===
- Virtual Visitation
- Community Work Program: The Community Work Program had a total of 1623 hours of community work in 2012.

== Notable inmates ==
- Bryan Freeman, convicted in the Freeman family murders
- Harrison Graham, serial killer who murdered seven women
- Harlow Cuadra, gay pornographic film actor convicted for the murder of gay pornographic film director Brian Kocis
- Alec Kreider, convicted in the Haines family murders

== See also ==
- List of Pennsylvania state prisons
