= Eric Smith (murderer) =

American murderer (born 1980)

- Born: Eric Hevner; January 22, 1980 (age 46); Savona, New York, U.S.
- Parent(s): Randy Hevner; Tammy Smith
- Status: Released on parole in 2022, parole discharged in 2025
- Conviction: Second-degree murder
- Penalty: Nine years to life in prison (paroled in 2022, parole discharged in 2025)

Details
- Victims: Derrick Joseph Robie, aged 4
- Date: August 2, 1993
- Location: Savona, New York

Eric M. Smith (born January 22, 1980) is an American murderer who, at the age of thirteen, sexually abused and murdered four-year-old Derrick Joseph Robie (October 2, 1988 – August 2, 1993), in Savona, New York, on August 2, 1993. Smith was convicted of second-degree murder on August 16, 1994 and sentenced to the maximum term then available for juvenile murderers: nine years to life in prison. Smith was granted parole in October 2021, after 27 years in prison. He was officially released from prison on February 1, 2022.

== Early life ==
Eric Smith was born on January 22, 1980 in Savona, New York to Theodore "Ted" Smith and Tammy Wilson. He had an older sister named Stacy Hevner, who Tammy had with her former boyfriend, Randy. He also had a younger sister by 1 year, Holly. He enjoyed being with his grandparents, Eddie and Red Wilson, who he spent time with throughout the majority of his childhood.

Eric had developmental delays that affected his walking, speech and learning abilities, which resulted in him having to attend a "pre-1st grade" program. He also had physical deformities that resulted from Tammy using a prescription drug used to control epilepsy called trimethadione while she was pregnant with Eric.

Eric became a target of bullying at around second grade due to his ginger hair, thick glasses and freckles, as well as his protruding low-set ears and learning difficulties. He was also bullied by his sister Stacy. He also got held back at fourth grade for not doing his homework for seven months straight.

Eric was also abused by Ted, who also abused Holly and molested Stacy when she was between 11 and 14 years old, which made her start suffering from depression and eventually move in with Randy after a suicide attempt by attempting to overdose on Tylenol.

At one point, Eric began killing animals by shooting at birds with a BB gun and throwing rocks and gutting frogs. He also began developing a nicotine addiction and began smoking at age 9. He was seen pedaling for hours alone. He graduated from Campbell-Savona Elementary School on June 1993.

== Murder ==
On August 2, 1993, when Eric Smith was thirteen years old, he was riding his bike to summer day camp in a local park. Four-year-old Derrick Robie, who was scheduled to start kindergarten on September 1993 at the same school Smith had just graduated from two months prior, was walking alone to the same camp after convincing his mother to let him go there alone when she was taking care of Derrick's crying 16-month-old brother, Dalton. Smith saw Robie and lured him into a nearby wooded area. There, Smith strangled him until he passed out, dropped a large rock on his head and sodomized him with a small stick. Smith then took Kool-Aid from Robie's lunch box and poured it into Robie's open wounds. The cause of death was determined to be blunt trauma to the head with contributing asphyxia. At around 11:00 a.m., Robie's mother went to the park to pick up her son, only to find that Robie had never arrived. After four hours of investigation, Robie's body was found.

On August 8, six days after the incident, Smith confessed to his mother that he killed Robie. The Smith family informed law enforcement later that night.

== Trial and aftermath ==
Smith was tried as an adult, making him the youngest murder defendant tried as an adult in New York state history. The murder case made national headlines in the United States, largely because of the ages of the killer (13) and his victim (4), the brutality of the crime and Smith's appearance contrasting the crime he was accused of.

Smith's trial began on August 2, 1994, on the first anniversary of Robie's murder.

He was subjected to extensive medical testing from specialists. They examined brain function, hormone levels and found nothing to explain his violent behavior. A defense psychiatrist, Dr. Stephen Herman, testified to diagnosing Smith with intermittent explosive disorder. However, the prosecution's expert, Dr. Kathleen Quinn, said the disorder was rarely seen at Smith's age, and instead described him as a boy who is "comfortable and excited by aggression". He was diagnosed with attention deficit hyperactivity disorder (ADHD) instead. He was also diagnosed with depression.

On August 16, 1994, Smith was convicted of second-degree murder. Tammy slumped tearfully in Ted's arms as the verdict was read, and Eddie Wilson collapsed and was rushed to the local hospital. Three months later, on November 7, he was sentenced to the maximum term then available for juvenile murderers: a minimum of nine years to life in prison.

Smith was held at Brookwood Secure Center in Claverack, a maximum security prison for juvenile inmates aged 13–17, for three years, and he was then transferred to an open prison for young adults. In 2001, he was transferred to the Clinton Correctional Facility in Dannemora, a maximum security prison. On May 3, 2016, the NYS Department of Corrections website showed him incarcerated at Collins Correctional Facility, a medium security prison for male inmates in Erie County. On April 26, 2019, he was listed as incarcerated at Gowanda Correctional Facility, a medium security prison which is co-located with Collins Correctional Facility. On November 30, 2019, he was listed as incarcerated at the Woodbourne Correctional Facility, a medium security prison in Sullivan County.

Smith was denied parole ten times from June 2002 to January 2020. After the 2012 hearing, the parole board cited a concern for public safety in its decision, in addition to the opposition of Robie's parents to his release. At that hearing, he told a parole board he would not return to Savona if released, and would go to a shelter or halfway house instead.

On October 7, 2021, Smith was granted parole after 27 years of incarceration. In that parole hearing, he revealed more about his childhood and expressed deep remorse for the murder, and revealed that he had been engaged to a lawyer since 2019, and that he was planning on moving to Queens if released. He was scheduled to be released on November 17, 2021, but this was delayed due to Smith not having an approved residence. He was ultimately released from prison on February 1, 2022. On April 16, 2025, Smith was discharged from parole supervision.

== See also ==
- Josh Phillips (murderer)
- Jesse Pomeroy
- Lionel Tate
- Murder of James Bulger
- Mary Bell
