= Harrison Graham =

American serial killer

- Harrison Graham in 1987
- Born: Harrison Frank Graham; September 9, 1959 (age 67); Philadelphia, Pennsylvania, U.S.
- Other name: "Marty" “Frank” “junior”
- Convictions: 7 × murder; 7 × desecrating a corpse
- Penalty: Death; commuted to life imprisonment

Details
- Victims: 7
- Span of crimes: 1986–1987
- Country: United States
- State: Pennsylvania
- Date apprehended: August 17, 1987
- Imprisoned at: SCI Coal Township

Harrison Frank "Marty" Graham (born September 9, 1959) is an American serial killer who murdered seven women in Philadelphia, Pennsylvania between mid-1986 to mid-1987, keeping their remains in his apartment. In 1988, he was found guilty on all charges and sentenced to death, but his sentences were later commuted to life imprisonment. Graham lived less than a mile and a half away from the home of another murderer, Gary M. Heidnik, who was also arrested during the same time period for similar crimes.

== Biography ==
Harrison Graham was born on September 9, 1959, in Philadelphia, the eldest of five children. Early on in childhood, he exhibited signs of an intellectual disability and had problems with academic performance and discipline at school. Graham attended the Olney High School, from which he was forced to drop out after the 10th grade due to his failing grades and chronic absences. His mother later claimed that in 1971, Harrison was diagnosed with a mental disorder and spent two years in a mental hospital or care facility but this claim has not been verified.

In the early 1970s, Graham entered the workforce and worked in many aspects of the construction industry. In 1979, he left his parents' house and moved to North Philadelphia, finding housing in a neighborhood rife with poverty and crime. During this period, he began to drink alcohol, use drugs and spend time among pimps and prostitutes. A tall and athletic man, he was not considered violent towards others and was never prosecuted for any crime. In 1983, Harrison rented an apartment in a mostly-vacant housing complex. A number of residents, including Graham himself, fenced off an area of the apartment parking lot as a place to buy and sell drugs. In the following four years, Graham turned his apartment into a drug den, where friends and acquaintances would often visit to buy and use drugs, consisting mainly of Ritalin and similar substances. Despite this, Graham was never known to engage in violent acts, regularly paid his rent and played basketball with the local youth, living off his disability pension, and was described as a nice man by friends and neighbors alike.

== Exposure ==
During the summer of 1987, Graham's neighbors complained to the landlord about a foul odor coming from Harrison's apartment. After several remarks, which he ignored, on August 9 the landlord demanded that Graham vacate the premises. Harrison refused to let anyone in, boarding up the front door with boards, before collecting his personal items and fleeing via the fire escape. After the landlord was unable to enter the apartment, he called the police. The police officers broke down the door, only to find the naked corpse of a black woman and the partially dressed corpse of another, traces of blood, drugs, as well as a layer of garbage 40 centimeters high, a pile of dirty mattresses and a skeleton. In the closet, more skeletonized remains, wrapped up in a blanket, were found. While inspecting the roof, the investigators found a green duffel bag, which contained the bones of the hands, feet and legs of another murder victim, while an excavation of the basement revealed a skull, ribcage and pelvic bone belonging to a 7th victim. Since all but two of the bodies were in a state of severe decomposition, the police found it difficult to determine their cause of death. The cause for the other two was determined to be strangulation. Graham was put on a wanted list, and during the following week he was reportedly seen on public transport, fast food restaurants, homeless shelters and a car wash, but avoided arrest each time. On August 17, Harrison tracked down his mother, who, after much persuasion, convinced him to surrender, after which she called the police. Graham was arrested on the same day by Philadelphia Police Officer Ed Spangler and Police Officer Larry Brzycki, at a distance of 10 blocks from the apartment. He was taken to the police station, where he readily confessed to all of the killings.

In his subsequent confession, he explained that he had strangled the seven women after sharing drugs with them during sex. According to his testimony, he committed the first murder at the end of 1986, and killed one of the victims solely because she had discovered one of the bodies. A forensic exam partially confirmed his testimony, concluding that the two recent victims had been strangled 10 days prior to discovery, while the other five had been dead for six to twelve months. The victims were subsequently identified as 27-year-old Cynthia Brooks, 25-year-old Valerie Jamison, 36-year-old Mary Jeter Mathis, 22-year-old Barbara Mahoney, 29-year-old Robin DeShazor, 33-year-old Sandra Garvin and 24-year-old Patricia Franklin. During the investigation, it was established that DeShazor had been Graham's longtime girlfriend. Harrison's mother told the police that back in 1981, after an argument with her son, she visited his apartment, where Robin was living, and had seen them use drugs together. An acquaintance of Graham also claimed that in 1984, he had seen him beat Robin.

== Trial and imprisonment ==
Harrison Graham's trial began on March 7, 1988. Early on, he refused a jury trial during the preliminary court hearings, as he fully admitted his guilt. The prosecutor's office demanded the death penalty, while his lawyer, Joel Moldowski, demanded that his client be given a lenient sentence. According to Moldowski, due to his intellectual disability and psychophysical development, Graham was incapable of distinguishing right from wrong, and this, coupled with heavy drug abuse, made him act on impulse and without any self-control. While the proceedings were going on, Harrison appeared to be completely calm. On April 28, 1988, Graham was found guilty on all charges, receiving six death sentences and one life imprisonment term for the murders. As leniency, the court ruled that Graham's death sentences would only be carried out after he has served out his life sentence, thus meaning that he will never be executed. After the trial, Graham asked his lawyer to give him back his Cookie Monster doll, which was seized from him after his arrest. Graham had been attached to the doll for years, it being one of the few items he took with him after escaping his apartment.

== Victims ==
Name	Age	Date of death
Cynthia Brooks	27	c. 1986
Valerie Jamison	25	c. 1986
Mary Jeter Mathis	36	c. 1986
Barbara Mahoney	22	c. 1986
Robin DeShazor	29	c. 1986
Sandra Garvin	33	c. 1986
Patricia Franklin	24	c. 1986

== See also ==
- List of serial killers in the United States

== Bibliography ==
- Allan L. Branson (March 23, 2016). The Anonymity of African American Serial Killers: A Continuum of Negative Imagery from Slavery to Prisons. CreateSpace Independent Publishing Platform. ISBN 978-1517460297.
- Anthony Walsh (November 1, 2005). "African Americans and Serial Killing in the Media: The Myth and the Reality". Homicide Studies. 9 (4). SAGE Publishing: 271–291. doi:10.1177/1088767905280080. S2CID 143399844.
