= Joel T. Lazarus =

American lawyer (1942–2023)

Joel T. Lazarus (July 5, 1942 - June 16, 2023) was a Florida prosecutor and later a circuit judge.

== Education ==
Lazarus received his bachelor's degree from Babson College and an MBA from Columbia Business School. However, Lazarus was unsuccessful in investment banking and in 1974 started law school at Nova Law School (now a part of Nova Southeastern University). He graduated in 1977.

== Prosecutor ==
Lazarus worked as an assistant state attorney for 15 years. During his career, he was involved in several high-profile cases. These include the prosecution of Kathy and Jeffrey Willets, who were defended by Ellis Rubin, and the prosecution of Eddie Mosley.

== Judge ==
=== Criminal court ===
Lazarus was appointed a circuit judge for Broward County, Florida in 1993 by governor Lawton Chiles. During his career as a judge, he presided over the case of Lionel Tate, who he sentenced to life imprisonment without the possibility of parole for a murder he had committed aged 12. The conviction was later overturned and Tate was released on house arrest and probation. A year later Tate was charged and convicted of armed robbery of a pizza delivery man and sentenced to 30 years in prison. Lazarus also handled the assault case against rapper Foxy Brown, and a corruption charge against a Hollywood, Florida city commissioner Keith Wasserstrom.

=== Initial retirement and civil foreclosure case work ===
Lazarus retired on December 31, 2010. The retirement was timed so as to prevent the governor from being able to directly appoint his replacement. He later returned to the bench for civil foreclosure cases.

Lazarus presided over Broward County's "rocket docket" where Lazarus allowed numerous firms to foreclose on homeowners with faulty deeds, mishandled record, and in many cases, forged documents. Many claims of fraud in the courts was being permitted by Lazarus in favor of banks against homeowners.

=== Ban from criminal court matters ===
In 2018, Lazarus was legally banned from criminal court matters following a statement that crimes committed closer to his residence would result in higher bonds.

Lazarus told the court: "I'll double the bond to those that take place in my neighborhood. Closer to my house, the higher the bond," he continued. "That was always Lazarus' rule."

Chief Judge Jack Tuter required that Lazarus be banned from all criminal court matters in the future, writing that Lazarus had undermined "our community's faith in the integrity and independence of the judiciary". Tuter informed Lazarus, who usually works civil foreclosure cases, that he is barred not only from ever presiding over first appearances again, but that he is also banned from all matters involving criminal court, saying the statement was "clearly inappropriate."
