= Josh Phillips (murderer) =

American murderer (born 1984)

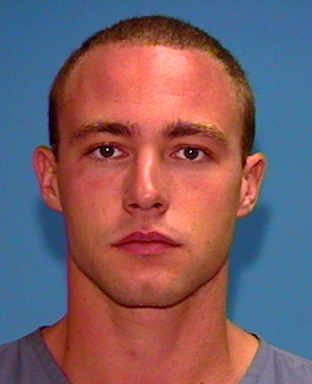
- Phillips in 2009
- Born: Joshua Earl Patrick Phillips; March 17, 1984 (age 42); Allentown, Pennsylvania, U.S.
- Status: Incarcerated at the Cross City Correctional Institution
- Motive: To end the victim's crying, and to avoid punishment from his father.
- Penalty: Life imprisonment without parole (eligible for re-sentencing in 2023)

Details
- Victims: Maddie Clifton
- Date: November 3, 1998
- Location: Jacksonville, Florida
- Weapons: Baseball bat, knife
- Date apprehended: November 10, 1998

Joshua Earl Patrick Phillips (born March 17, 1984) is an American man who was convicted of murder as a child. In November 1998, when he was 14 years old, Phillips killed Madelyn Rae Clifton (June 17, 1990 – November 3, 1998), his 8-year-old friend and neighbor. The following year, he was sentenced to life imprisonment without the possibility of parole. Phillips stated that he killed Clifton to stop her from crying after she was accidentally struck with a baseball while they were playing, and that he feared punishment from his abusive father. Although elements of Phillips's story are disputed, officials who were involved in his prosecution have subsequently expressed contrition over the severity of his sentence. In 2017, Phillips was re-sentenced to life in prison on appeal, but he has been eligible for re-sentencing as of 2023.

== Early life ==
Phillips was born in Allentown, Pennsylvania, on March 17, 1984, to Steve and Melissa Phillips. Steve, a drug addict and alcoholic, was violent towards Phillips and Melissa, who both reported living in fear of him. Steve imposed strict rules on his son, got angry if he had other children in the house when he was not present, and particularly disliked young girls; Melissa said she never understood why her husband disliked girls. Eventually, Steve decided to relocate the family from Lehigh Valley, Pennsylvania to Florida, separating Phillips from his half-brothers Daniel and Benjie.

In November 1998, Phillips was 14 years old and living with his family in Jacksonville, Florida. Neighbors described Phillips as "quiet and friendly". Phillips had no arrests or history of violence prior to the murder. His school teacher said he was a popular student who did not stand out, describing him as fun and silly.

Phillips and Clifton were friends and playmates. Clifton's mother, Sheila, confirmed the friendship, and said she never had any reason to be afraid of Phillips, and Clifton's father, Steve, said his daughter enjoyed playing with Phillips. Clifton's sister Jessie, who also used to play with Phillips, described him prior to the murder as "a pretty decent kid". A year before the murder, Phillips was making a home video in his front yard when Jessie and Clifton came over to his house to visit. The video shows the two sisters being friendly with Phillips and playing with his dog.

== Murder of Maddie Clifton ==
According to Phillips, on November 3, 1998, he was home alone when Clifton, who lived across the road from the Phillips, came to his house asking him to come outside and play baseball. Phillips agreed, even though he was not allowed to have friends over while his parents were not home. As the two were playing baseball, Phillips accidentally hit the ball into Clifton's eye, causing her to bleed, cry, and scream. Phillips panicked, knowing his father would be home soon and fearing his reaction. Phillips dragged Clifton into his house, saying that the clothing came off Clifton's lower body as he did so. He hit her with the baseball bat to stop her from screaming before putting her under the base of his bed. When Steve returned home, Phillips interacted with him for a period of time before returning to his room. When Phillips discovered that Clifton was still alive and moaning under his bed, he removed the mattress, cut her throat, and stabbed her in the chest seven times with the knife from a Leatherman tool, killing her.

Clifton's disappearance was reported around 5:00 pm that day. Police and volunteers searched for Clifton for six days; Phillips participated in the search. He later stated he spent the following week living in denial, saying, "I was putting myself in a fantasy world that nothing had happened. That was my defense mechanism for everything when I was a kid. I never made the decision ... to ignore it. I just did."

On November 10, Melissa Phillips went into her son's room and noticed a wet spot on the floor. She searched the room and found Clifton's body, immediately leaving the house to report the incident to the police. Phillips was arrested later that day at his school and confessed to the murder within hours.

Prosecutors disputed some parts of Phillips' story. State Attorney Harry Shorstein suggested the murder may have been sexually motivated, saying that Phillips had talked about sexual matters with both Clifton and her older sister, Jessie. The autopsy found no evidence of sexual assault, though prosecutors argued the lack of dirt and sand on Clifton's body did not support Phillips' assertion that her clothes came off as he dragged her into his room. Prosecutors also noted that no blood was found in the backyard, or on the baseball that Phillips said he had struck Clifton with, and argued that this did not support his version of events.

== Trial ==
Phillips was tried as an adult. The trial was moved from Duval County, Florida, to Polk County over concerns about the publicity in Jacksonville. Phillips's lawyer, Richard D. Nichols, did not call a single witness for the defense, a move the prosecutors later said was a surprising and risky strategy. Nichols intended to base much of the defense on a closing argument to the jury, where he stated Clifton's death was "an act that began as an accident and deteriorated through panic that bordered on madness". According to Phillips, Nichols never attempted to question him over the events of the murder, and only played chess with him when visiting him in jail prior to the trial. Melissa Phillips disagreed with Nichols's strategy, though Steve insisted on letting the lawyer do as he pleased. Nichols discouraged Phillips' parents from allowing him to testify. Accordingly, Phillips never spoke during his trial.

The trial started on July 6, 1999, and lasted only two days, an unusually short time due to the defense calling no witnesses. Jurors took just over two hours to convict Phillips of first-degree murder. He was later sentenced to life imprisonment without the possibility of parole; he was not eligible for the death penalty, as he was under 16.

During the trial the defense attempted to introduce scans from a neurologist showing bilateral lesions on the frontal lobe of Phillips' brain, which are associated with panic and impaired judgement, while the prosecution wanted to discuss evidence Phillips had looked at pornography on his computer. The judge, however, ruled both pieces of evidence inadmissible.

== Life in prison ==
Phillips completed his General Educational Development in prison, although he was initially told he was too young to do it, and later took college classes by correspondence. Phillips works as a paralegal in prison, assisting other inmates with their appeals, and also works as a tutor for inmates. He also plays guitar in a band, and participates in Christian religious services, zazen and yoga. During his 2017 appeal, the prosecution acknowledged that Phillips had been a model prisoner.

As of 2008, Phillips declined to write a letter of apology to Clifton's family, saying they deserved an apology from him in person, as they would not be able to see his sincerity in a letter. Clifton's mother subsequently stated she had no interest in talking to Phillips. As of 2024, Phillips is imprisoned in the Cross City Correctional Institution.

On June 27, 2000, Steve Phillips was killed in a car accident.

== Appeals ==
"I know some people thought [the original] sentence was appropriate, but that was a tough sentence for someone that young. I never got the feeling that it was a malicious, mean-spirited, calculated murder. It was kind of an impulsive act that, given a different set of circumstances, would never have happened."

— Sheriff Nat Glover, who originally advocated for Phillips's life-sentence, commenting in 2008

In 2002, the Florida Second District Court of Appeal upheld Phillips's conviction. In December 2004, Melissa Phillips began to seek a new trial for her son, stating his young age at the time of the murder should have carried more weight in his sentence. In November 2005, the Supreme Court of Florida set a hearing for the following month to discuss whether Phillips should receive a new trial.

In 2008, two of the officials most responsible for Phillips's life sentence, Harry Shorstein and Sheriff Nat Glover, admitted having second thoughts about giving a life sentence without the possibility of parole to a 14-year-old. Shorstein said he regretted not offering Phillips a second-degree murder plea, which would have given the judge more discretion in sentencing, and has voiced his support for eventual clemency or parole for Phillips.

In 2012, the Supreme Court of the United States case of Miller v. Alabama ruled that sentencing juveniles to mandatory life in prison without parole is unconstitutional. In November 2015, Phillips' attorneys were considering Miller v. Alabama as a basis to file a re-sentencing hearing. In September 2016, Phillips' attorneys successfully appealed the court, and he was granted a new sentencing hearing, which was held in June 2017. At the hearing, Clifton's mother requested that his sentence be upheld. In November 2017, Phillips was re-sentenced to life in prison, but is eligible for re-sentencing again in 2023. In December 2019, the Florida First District Court of Appeal upheld the life sentence, saying it will be reviewed again and could be modified in 2023 "based on demonstrated maturity and rehabilitation." Phillips subsequently appealed to the Supreme Court of Florida, who turned down his request in June 2020. As is customary, they did not explain their reasons for declining to hear the case.

In May 2026, Phillips temporarily withdrew an application for sentencing review, after it was noted he had not completed professional counselling regarding aspects of his crimes. Phillips states he had previously applied for counselling though was refused access to such courses on the grounds he was serving a life sentence; he intends to renew his application for sentencing review after completing the required courses.

== In the media ==
In 1999, the murder was the subject of a documentary on 48 Hours titled "Why Did Josh Kill?" The murder was featured on the season 2 premiere of Killer Kids in 2012. In 2018, Phillips was interviewed by British journalist Susanna Reid for the ITV documentary Children Who Kill. That same year, the murder and Phillips's trial were featured on an episode of the podcast Sword and Scale. The murder and Phillips's appeal were featured in two episodes of Morbid: A True Crime Podcast, released in 2019 and 2020 respectively.

== See also ==
- Eric Smith
- Lionel Tate
- Mary Bell
