= Viximo =

Viximo, located in Cambridge, Massachusetts, develops software for virtual currency utilized in social networking, online dating, and casual gaming sites. The software encompasses payment systems, virtual goods, and white-label apps and games.

== History ==
Viximo was founded in October 2008 by Brian Balfour and Sean Lindsay. In April 2009, the company secured USD 5 million in funding from North Bridge Venture Partners and Sigma Partners. In January 2010, Viximo appointed Dale Strang as Chief Executive Officer. In July 2012, the company received an investment from Michael Pope and Adam Levin. Michael Pope was appointed President in July 2012, with Shamoon Siddiqui being appointed interim CTO.

In October 2015, Viximo announced its acquisition by Pocket Games, Inc. (OTC PINK: PKGM).

In October 2009, Viximo announced a partnership with Zorpia.com, an international social network boasting 16 million users worldwide.

In November 2009, Viximo added music company Interscope Geffen A&M, a division of Universal Music Group, to its portfolio of clients and powered Lady Gaga's Gift Shop on Facebook.

In January 2010, Viximo was among 11 Boston start-ups recognized as winners of the 2010 OnMedia 100 Top Private Companies Award.

In late July 2012, Viximo was acquired by Social Technology Holdings, Inc.

== Business model ==
Viximo operates on revenue-sharing agreements with social networking, online dating, and casual gaming sites. Viximo equips these online publishers with technology that enables them to operate a virtual goods economy, helping them monetize user activities and boost user engagement. The technology includes virtual currency, payment systems, user analytics, and white-label apps and games where users can spend virtual currency. Viximo also works with content creators such as artists, brands, sports teams, athletes and celebrities to distribute and monetize branded content.

Viximo's publisher network reaches over 60 million monthly users. As of 2010, their clients included:

- Bebo
- BlackPlanet
- Quepasa
- Friendster
- Gaia Online
- Multiply
- StudiVZ
- Tuenti
