= Zorpia =

Social networking service

- Screenshot Screenshot of Zorpia's homepage.
- Website type: Social networking service
- Available in: Multilingual (2)
- Owner: Zorpia Co. Ltd.
- Creators: Jeffrey Ng, CEO of Zorpia Co. Ltd.
- Website: zorpia.com
- Launched: December 7, 2003
- Current status: Defunct as of 2020

Zorpia (Chinese: 若比鄰) is a social networking service with customers in China. Zorpia was one of the few international social networks with a Chinese Internet Content Provider license. The social networking site reported 2 million unique users per month and a total worldwide user base of 26 million in 2013. Jeffrey Ng was the company's founder and CEO of Zorpia. The privately funded company was based in Hong Kong and has 30 employees.

Zorpia has been accused of spamming misleading messages on behalf of people to their address books without their consent or knowledge as a way of acquiring email addresses. In 2012, PandoDaily wrote that Zorpia "has a dreadful spamming problem that it needs to fix fast."

By early 2020, Zorpia had been acquired by Twoo, and zorpia.com was redirected there until the latter site's shutdown in 2022, when all users were migrated to Plenty of Fish.

== History ==
In December 2003, Jeffrey Ng founded Zorpia as a social networking service. Ng wanted it to be an online nation for people looking for new relationships. While sites such as Facebook and Twitter are still banned in China, the ban has allowed Zorpia to use its ICP license in China to grow its user base. In 2009, the company partnered with Viximo, a distributor of software for virtual goods and currency.

== Leadership ==
Jeffrey Ng began his entrepreneurial career at the age of 13. He started his own Japanese music website and music search engine. He graduated from the University of Illinois at Urbana Champaign with a degree in computer engineering. Before building Zorpia, he worked for Expedia and at his university's National Center for Supercomputing Applications.

== Services ==
Zorpia's features included photo-sharing, social networking, messaging and profiles. Zorpia developed technology to analyze and predict compatibility between strangers, and developed false identity prevention systems and user attractiveness discovery algorithms to help people make friends.

Zorpia was one of the few social networking sites permitted for use in China.

== Recognition ==
Alexa Internet ranked Zorpia in 2013 among the 6,000 most-visited websites worldwide, with a global rank of about 4000 and with 40% users from India and 10% users from China. Alexa also ranked Zorpia among the top 1000 most popular websites in India, with a rank of 933.

Business Today India named Zorpia as the growth leader in the India market from 2009 to 2010. Zorpia has been recognized by CNN, China Daily, the biggest English-language newspaper in China, and it has been featured in Phoenix Television's A Date with Luyu.

== Privacy issues ==
In September 2013, Zorpia was accused of cookie theft, mining and spam. The company responded that the ratio of complaints to users is very small.

Zorpia typically asks for permission to connect to Facebook or Google account, then sends automatic emails on the user's behalf to his contacts inviting them to join to read the messages. Even after deleting their Zorpia accounts, users see their contacts flooded with such emails on their behalf. One reporter testing how the email collection occurs found one of his test email accounts had a Zorpia account created without his acknowledgement; Zorpia claimed the user had signed up and claimed many of the undesirable behaviors are bugs. Opinions on the best response to Zorpia emails are mixed with some users suggesting trying to unsubscribe and some suggesting using an email feature to block emails from Zorpia. One user reported even more spam activity after trying to unsubscribe. A suggestion is to review Google account settings.
