= Freeman family murders =

1995 family murder in Pennsylvania, US

- Location: Salisbury Township, Lehigh County, Pennsylvania, U.S.
- Date: February 26, 1995
- Attack type: Triple murder
- Weapons: Steak knife, aluminum baseball bat, metal exercise bar, wooden pickaxe handle
- Victims: Dennis Freeman; Brenda Freeman; Erik Freeman
- Perpetrators: Bryan Freeman; David Freeman; Ben Birdwell

On February 26, 1995, Bryan and David Freeman murdered their parents, Brenda and Dennis, and their younger brother, Erik, at their family home with the help of their cousin, Ben Birdwell, in Salisbury Township, Lehigh County, Pennsylvania. For several years, Bryan and David had been embracing neo-Nazi culture, which escalated in the months leading up to the killings, including tattooing Nazi slogans on their foreheads. Both brothers and their cousin were given life sentences without the possibility of parole, though none of the three were convicted in the murder of Erik Freeman.

In 2014, the sentences were upheld despite the recent Supreme Court ruling that mandatory life-without-parole sentences were unconstitutional for juveniles convicted of murder. In February 2024, the Freeman brothers were resentenced to 60 years to life and will become eligible for parole in 2055.

== Background ==
Dennis and Brenda Freeman lived in Salisbury Township, Pennsylvania. Dennis worked as a janitor at a local high school. He and his wife Brenda had three sons; the oldest was Bryan, followed by David, and then Erik. They were a religious family and brought up their sons as Jehovah's Witnesses. Bryan and David resented their family lifestyle and turned to neo-Nazism.

Friends of Brenda spoke of how she was scared of both her older sons. Bryan and David shaved their heads, wore military uniforms, and embraced a neo-Nazi subculture. Bryan had the word "Berserker" tattooed across his forehead and David had "Sieg Heil" tattooed above his eyebrows. Brenda reportedly telephoned counselors as well as psychologists to ask for advice. She managed to convince Bryan and David to attend "anti-skinhead" education sessions run by the police, but ultimately her efforts to deter them from neo-Nazism failed. Bryan had been admitted to hospital for mental illness and David had been placed in several juvenile facilities as well as receiving treatment for substance abuse.

According to Salisbury police, they had visited the Freeman home a total of five times between 1993 and 1995. Police said Bryan had also threatened to kill his parents in an altercation over using the family car. Just days before the murders, Bryan had been suspended from Salisbury High School for drawing racist pictures in a book.

== Murders ==
On February 26, 1995, 17-year-old Bryan Freeman, 16-year-old David Freeman, and their cousin 18-year-old Nelson "Ben" Birdwell III arrived at the Freeman family home. The three of them had been out at the movies and had returned to the family home on Ehrets Lane. 48-year-old Brenda Freeman had an argument with Bryan and David about Birdwell being in the house. As Brenda came down the stairs, Bryan grabbed hold of her and forcefully wedged a pair of shorts into her mouth. He then stabbed her repeatedly to death with a steak knife he had retrieved from the kitchen.

David and Birdwell then went upstairs to the bedroom of 54-year-old Dennis Freeman who was lying asleep in bed. The two of them then beat Dennis to death with a metal exercise bar and an aluminum baseball bat. 11-year-old Erik was also lying asleep in bed. He was hit repeatedly with a 3-foot pickaxe handle by one or several of the perpetrators until he died. The trio then left the home armed with a 12-gauge shotgun and fled in Brenda's car, a 1988 Pontiac convertible.

== Aftermath ==
The bodies of the Freemans were found in their home by Dennis's sister, Valerie Freeman, on the day after they had been murdered. Coroners in Allentown described the killings as one of the most brutal acts of murder they had ever seen.

Lehigh County district attorney Bob Steinberg also described the murders as brutal, claiming the faces of both Dennis and Erik had been beaten and bludgeoned so badly that they were nearly beyond recognition. The Freeman brothers and Birdwell fled to Hope, Michigan to the home of Frank Hesse, who was a skinhead associate. The Freeman brothers had met Hesse at a New Year's Eve concert and had exchanged phone numbers. They were captured and arrested at the home three days after the murders had occurred.

To avoid the death penalty, Bryan pleaded guilty to Brenda's murder, while David pleaded guilty to the murder of Dennis. Birdwell was tried for all three murders and was convicted of the murder of Dennis Freeman after DNA testing matched blood on his T-shirt as belonging to Dennis. No one was convicted for Erik's murder. Bryan confessed that the murders had stemmed from years of ongoing animosity between the brothers and their parents. All three suspects were spared the death penalty, but each was sentenced to life in prison without the possibility of parole.

The men are incarcerated in the Pennsylvania Department of Corrections. Bryan is imprisoned in State Correctional Institution – Coal Township under inmate number CX3426. David is imprisoned in State Correctional Institution – Mahanoy under inmate number CX3437. Birdwell is imprisoned in State Correctional Institution – Greene under inmate number DA9633.

== Perpetrators ==
Bryan Robert Freeman

David Johnathan Freeman

Nelson Benjamin Birdwell III

Bryan Robert Freeman (born January 7, 1978), David Jonathan Freeman (born February 9, 1979), and Nelson Benjamin "Ben" Birdwell III (born February 13, 1977) were identified as the three perpetrators of the crime. All three identified as neo-Nazis but they were not part of any neo-Nazi group. The trio were allegedly planning on forming their own neo-Nazi group prior to the murders. Valerie Freeman had noticed a change in Bryan and David's behavior. She described her nephews as becoming defiant and combative.

The Freeman brothers expressed regret and remorse over the crime on the 20th anniversary of the killings. Bryan Freeman made a statement in which he admitted to doing a terrible thing and that he deserved to be punished.

== Howorth killings ==
The Freeman family murders occurred in one of the most violent periods of Lehigh Valley history. Between January and May 1995, there were a total of fourteen homicides in the area. The day after the Freeman brothers and Birdwell were captured, on March 2, 1995, 17-year-old Jeffrey Howorth shot and killed both of his parents, George and Susan Howorth, with a hunting rifle. Howorth waited at his Lower Macungie Township family home for his parents to return and then murdered them separately. He then fled the area and was arrested on March 4, 1995, two days after the killings. He was apprehended in Missouri after his car ran out of gas.

At his trial, it was learned that Howorth had been inspired to commit the crime from hearing about the Freeman family murders. Howorth wrote a note in an apparent reference to the Freeman brothers. Later that year, Howorth was found not guilty by reason of insanity and was acquitted of the killings of his parents. Howorth was involuntarily committed and currently remains located at Wernersville State Hospital under state supervision in Berks County, Pennsylvania.

== In popular culture ==
True crime author Fred Rosen wrote a book called Blood Crimes, which was about the Freeman family murders. The book details the story of the Freeman brothers and divulges the history of the Freeman family. In 2014, the stories of both the Freeman family murders and the Howorth killings were featured in the same episode of the documentary series Killer Kids.

On February 11, 2022, the murders were recounted on the Oxygen series Killer Siblings episode "Freemans."
