= Lionel Tate =

American convicted of first-degree murder when he was 13 years old (born 1987)

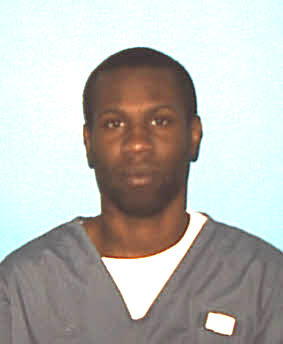
- Born: January 30, 1987 (age 39); Broward County, Florida, United States
- Status: Incarcerated at Hamilton Correctional Institution Annex
- Convictions: Second-degree murder, probation violation and armed robbery
- Penalty: Life without parole for First-degree murder (2001); overturned and released under house arrest (2004); concurrent 10- and 30-year sentences for armed robbery and probation violation (2005)

Lionel Alexander Tate (born January 29, 1987) is the youngest American citizen ever sentenced to life imprisonment without the possibility of parole, though this sentence was eventually overturned. In January 2001, when Tate was 13, he was convicted of first-degree murder for the 1999 battering death of six-year-old Tiffany Eunick in Broward County, Florida; he was imitating professional wrestling moves.

== Murder ==
On July 28, 1999, Tate was left alone with Eunick, his cousin, who was being babysat by Tate's mother, Kathleen Grossett-Tate. The two were downstairs, playing while watching the professional wrestling program WCW Thunder. Tate's mother called to them to be quiet. Roughly 45 minutes later, Tate came upstairs to tell his mother that Tiffany was not breathing. Her legs, feet, and neck all had serious bruises; the amount of force used on her caused bruising similar to that from a speeding car. Her other injuries included a fractured skull, lacerated liver, fractured rib, and swollen brain.

The case was prosecuted by Assistant State Attorney Kenneth Padowitz, a member of Broward County's homicide division. Padowitz argued that the severity of Tiffany Eunick's injuries was inconsistent with an accidental fall or roughhousing, emphasizing that the beating lasted for several minutes. He sought to demonstrate that Tate's actions met the legal standard for first-degree murder despite his age, making the trial one of the youngest homicide prosecutions in U.S. history.

In sentencing Tate to life imprisonment, Judge Joel T. Lazarus of Broward County Circuit Court said that "The acts of Lionel Tate were not the playful acts of a child [...] The acts of Lionel Tate were cold, callous and indescribably cruel." Professional wrestlers Hulk Hogan, Sting and Dwayne Johnson were subpoenaed by the defence but Judge Lazarus ruled they would not have to appear in court.

=== Felony murder rule ===
Florida statutes required the jury to convict Tate of first-degree murder even if the jury did not believe that he intended to kill or injure anyone—all that was required was that Tate knowingly abused another child who died as a result, as any intentional act that could reasonably be expected to result in physical injury to a child is child abuse per Florida statutes. The rule for such convictions is known as the felony murder rule. The sufficient conditions of the felony murder rule were listed by the judge Joel T. Lazarus during sentencing. Therefore, Tate was sentenced to life in prison without the prosecution having to prove that he intended to kill or injure, or realized that his acts are likely to kill or injure, or even that a typical child of his age would or should realize this.

Critics, such as the various groups listed in the amicus brief attached to Tate's appeal, assert that convicting children under 14 of first-degree murder without having to prove these children intended any harm, not to mention serious injury or death, is unacceptable.

The sentence was controversial because Tate was 12 years old at the time of the murder, and his victim was 6. He was the youngest person in modern US history to be sentenced to life imprisonment, bringing broad criticism on the treatment of juvenile offenders in the justice system of the state of Florida.

=== Original sentence overturned ===
After the conviction, the prosecution openly joined Tate's plea for leniency in sentencing and even offered to help in his appeal. The trial judge criticized the prosecution for compromising the integrity of the adversarial system, and said that if the prosecution felt that life imprisonment was not warranted, they should not have charged him with murder in the first place.

In January 2004, a state appeals court overturned his conviction on the basis that his mental competency had not been evaluated before trial. This opened the way for Tate to accept the same plea deal he originally turned down, and he was released on one year's house arrest and 10 years' probation.

=== Reactions by the WWF ===
Eunick's death had sparked fury and controversy. The lawyer for Lionel Tate, James Lewis was sued by the World Wrestling Federation Entertainment, Inc. alleging that the attorney and others have conspired to damage the WWF's image. The WWF then filed the 10-count libel suit on November 9, 2000 against Lewis and the Parents Television Council in the U.S. District Court for the Southern District of New York, claiming that the PTC's statements were false and constituted defamation. The WWF also filed a copyright infringement lawsuit against the PTC for using clips from WWF programs in their promotional videos. The PTC filed for dismissal of the suit, but on May 24, 2001, U.S. district court Judge Denny Chin denied the PTC's motion on the basis that the WWF's lawsuit had merit. The PTC and the WWF settled out of court and, as part of the settlement agreement, the PTC paid the WWF US$3.5 million and L. Brent Bozell III issued a public apology, stating that it was wrong to blame the World Wrestling Federation or any of its programs for the deaths of children and that the original statements had been based on what was later found to be false information designed by people close to Tate blaming his cousin's death on the WWF.

== Armed robbery arrest and subsequent plea bargain ==
On May 23, 2005, Tate was charged with armed burglary, battery, armed robbery, and violation of probation, the Broward County Sheriff's Office said.

Tate threatened Domino's Pizza deliveryman Walter Ernest Gallardo with a handgun outside a friend's apartment after phoning in an order. Gallardo dropped the four pizzas and fled the scene. Tate then re-entered the apartment, assaulting the occupant who did not want Tate inside.

Gallardo called 911 upon reaching the Domino's store and returned to identify Tate, the sheriff's office said in a statement, but no gun was recovered.

On March 1, 2006, Tate accepted a plea bargain and was to be sentenced to 30 years' imprisonment in a sentencing hearing in April 2006. Tate admitted that he had violated probation by possessing a gun during the May 23 violent robbery, but he refused to answer questions about where he got and later disposed of the gun. He was allowed to withdraw his guilty plea for robbery but was finally sentenced to 30 years in prison on May 18, 2006, for violating probation. On October 24, 2007, Florida's 4th District Court of Appeal upheld that sentence.

On February 19, 2008, Tate pled no contest to the robbery and was sentenced to 10 years in state prison. The sentence will run concurrently with his 30-year sentence for violating his probation. Tate is currently imprisoned in the Hamilton Correctional Institution Annex.
