= Brian Howe =

Brian Howe may refer to:

- Brian Howe (politician) (born 1936), Australian politician and Uniting Church minister
- Brian Howe (singer) (1953–2020), English vocalist with the 1980s and 1990s versions of Bad Company
- Brian Howe (actor), American character actor best known for his major role in The Pursuit of Happyness
- Brian Howe, murder victim of Mary Bell

== See also ==
- Brian Howes, Canadian musician
