= Murder of James Bulger =

1993 child murder in Liverpool, England

- James Bulger
- Location: Walton, Liverpool, England
- Date: 12 February 1993; 33 years ago
- Attack type: Child-on-child murder by bludgeoning, torture murder, kidnapping, mutilation, dismemberment
- Weapons: Bricks, stones, fishplate, others
- Victim: James Bulger
- Perpetrators: Robert Thompson; Jon Venables
- Motive: Undetermined
- Verdict: Guilty
- Convictions: Murder, abduction
- Sentence: Indefinite sentence in juvenile detention (paroled after 8 years)

On 12 February 1993 in Merseyside, England, two 10-year-old boys, Robert Thompson and Jon Venables, abducted, tortured, and murdered a two-year-old boy, James Patrick Bulger (16 March 1990 – 12 February 1993). Thompson and Venables led Bulger away from the New Strand Shopping Centre in Bootle, where Bulger was visiting shops with his mother. His mutilated body was found on a railway line 2 1/2 miles (4 kilometres) away in Walton, Liverpool, two days later.

Thompson and Venables were found guilty of abduction and murder on 24 November, making them the youngest convicted murderers in modern British history. They were sentenced to indefinite detention at Her Majesty's pleasure, and remained in custody until a Parole Board decision in June 2001 recommended their release on a life licence at age 18. Venables was sent to prison in 2010 for possessing indecent images of children on his computer, was released on parole again in 2013, before being returned to prison in November 2017 for the same offence. His 2023 and 2026 appeals for parole were rejected.

The case has prompted widespread debate about how to handle young offenders when they are sentenced or released from custody.

== Abduction ==
Shopping centre CCTV still image of Bulger's abduction (Venables holding Bulger's hand, Thompson in front)

On the morning of 12 February 1993, Robert Thompson and Jon Venables visited the New Strand Shopping Centre in Bootle while playing truant. Throughout the day, they were seen shoplifting various items, including batteries, paint, sweets and a troll doll. One of the boys later said that before they abducted Bulger, they were planning to abduct a child, lead him to the busy road alongside the shopping centre, and push him into the oncoming traffic.

That same afternoon, two-year-old James Bulger, from Kirkby, was at the New Strand Shopping Centre with his mother, Denise. At approximately 15:40, while in A.R. Tym's butcher's shop on the lower floor, Denise momentarily let go of James's hand to pay for her shopping and discovered he was missing. Thompson and Venables had approached Bulger, taken him by the hand, and led him out of the shopping centre. This act was captured on closed-circuit television (CCTV) at 15:42.

Thompson and Venables took Bulger to the Leeds and Liverpool Canal, around 1/4 mile (400 metres) from the New Strand Shopping Centre. There, they dropped him on his head, causing facial injuries, and joked about pushing him into the canal. An eyewitness later described Bulger at the canal as "crying his eyes out". The boys took Bulger on a 2 1/2-mile (4-kilometre) walk across Liverpool, during which they were seen by around 38 people; however, most bystanders did not intervene. When questioned, Thompson and Venables claimed that Bulger was either their brother or a lost child they were taking to a police station. At one point, the boys took Bulger into a pet shop, from which they were ejected.

== Torture and murder ==
Eventually, the boys arrived in Walton. With Walton Lane Police Station across the road, they hesitated, then led Bulger up a steep bank to a railway line near the former Walton & Anfield railway station. One of the boys threw the blue paint that they had shoplifted earlier into Bulger's left eye. They kicked him, stamped on him, and threw bricks and stones at him. They forced batteries into Bulger's mouth and may have inserted some into his anus, though none were found there. Finally, the boys dropped a 10 kg (22 lb) railway fishplate on Bulger, resulting in ten skull fractures. Pathologist Alan Williams concluded that Bulger sustained a total of 42 injuries, none of which could be identified as the fatal blow.

Thompson and Venables laid Bulger across the railway tracks and weighted his head down with rubble. Their intention was for a passing train to strike him, making his death appear accidental. His body was severed by a train after they had departed the scene. Bulger's remains were discovered by four boys looking for footballs two days later. Forensic examination later determined that Bulger had died from his injuries before being struck by the train.

== Investigation ==
Upon discovering Bulger's body, police suspected sexual assault, as Bulger's shoes, socks, trousers, and underpants had been removed. The pathologist's report, which was read out in court, noted that Bulger's foreskin had been forcibly retracted. When questioned about this aspect of the attack, Thompson and Venables were reluctant to provide details. Years later, after Venables was released, his psychiatrist, Susan Bailey, reported his continued denial of any sexual element to the crime.

The police investigation quickly yielded low-resolution CCTV images showing two unidentified boys abducting Bulger from the New Strand Shopping Centre. The following search for the suspects turned into a state of hysteria, forcing officers to check school attendance records and, in some cases, urging parents to report their own children as potential perpetrators. One boy's arrest provoked such fury that vigilantes attacked his home and his family had to be relocated, despite him not being formally charged. The breakthrough came when a woman, upon seeing enhanced images of the two boys on national television, recognised Venables. She recalled seeing him that day playing truant with Thompson in the Bootle area, and her call to the police led directly to their arrest.

== Legal proceedings ==
=== Arrest ===
Mug shots of Jon Venables and Robert Thompson taken at the time of their arrest

Forensic tests confirmed that both boys had the same blue paint on their clothing as was found on Bulger's body. Both had blood on their shoes; the blood on Thompson's shoe was matched to Bulger's through DNA profiling. A pattern of bruising on Bulger's right cheek matched the features of the upper part of a shoe worn by Thompson; a paint mark in the toecap of one of Venables's shoes indicated he must have used "some force" when he kicked Bulger. Thompson is said to have asked the police if they had taken Bulger to a hospital to "get him alive again".

The boys were each charged with the murder of James Bulger on 20 February 1993, and they appeared at South Sefton Youth Court on 22 February 1993, where they were remanded in custody to await trial. In the aftermath of their arrest, and throughout the media accounts of their trial, the boys were anonymised as "Child A" (Thompson) and "Child B" (Venables). Awaiting trial, they were held in the secure units where they would eventually be sentenced to be detained at Her Majesty's pleasure.

=== Trial ===
Up to 500 protesters gathered at the Magistrates' Court in the Metropolitan Borough of Sefton during the boys' initial court appearances. The full trial opened at Sessions House, Preston, on 1 November 1993, and was conducted as an adult trial with the accused in the dock away from their parents, and the judge and court officials in legal regalia. The boys denied the charges of murder, abduction and attempted abduction. The attempted abduction charge related to an incident at the New Strand Shopping Centre earlier on 12 February 1993, the day of Bulger's death. Thompson and Venables had attempted to lead away another two-year-old boy, but had been prevented from doing so by the boy's mother.

Each boy sat in view of the court on raised chairs so that they could see out of the dock designed for adults, and were accompanied by two social workers and guards. Although they were separated from their parents, they were within touching distance when their families attended the trial. News stories reported the demeanour of the defendants. These aspects of the trial were later criticised by the European Court of Human Rights, which ruled in 1999 that they had not received a fair trial by being tried in public in an adult court. At the trial, the lead prosecution counsel Richard Henriques successfully rebutted the principle of doli incapax, which presumes that young children cannot be held legally responsible for their actions.

Thompson and Venables were considered by the court to be capable of "mischievous discretion", meaning an ability to act with criminal intent as they were mature enough to understand that they were doing something seriously wrong. A child psychiatrist, Eileen Vizard, who interviewed Thompson before the trial, was asked in court whether he would know the difference between right and wrong, that it was wrong to take a young child away from his mother, and that it was wrong to cause injury to a child. Vizard replied, "If the issue is on the balance of probabilities, I think I can answer with certainty," that he did. Vizard also said that Thompson was suffering from post-traumatic stress disorder after the attack on Bulger. Susan Bailey, the Home Office's forensic psychiatrist who had interviewed Venables, said unequivocally that he knew the difference between right and wrong.

Thompson and Venables did not speak during the trial, and the case against them was largely based on the more than 20 hours of tape-recorded police interviews with the boys, which were played back in court. Thompson was presented as having taken the leading role in the abduction, though it was Venables who had apparently initiated the idea of taking Bulger to the railway line. Venables later described how Bulger seemed to like him, holding his hand and allowing him to pick him up on the meandering journey to the scene of his murder. Laurence Lee, who acted as solicitor for Venables during the trial, later said that Thompson was one of the most frightening children he had seen, and compared him to the Pied Piper. After his appearances in court, Venables would strip off his clothes, saying: "I can smell James like a baby smell." The prosecution admitted a number of exhibits during the trial, including a box of 27 bricks, a blood-stained stone, Bulger's underpants, and the rusty iron bar described as a railway fishplate. The pathologist spent 33 minutes outlining the injuries sustained by Bulger; many of those to his legs had been inflicted after he was stripped from the waist down. Brain damage was extensive and included a haemorrhage.

The boys, by then aged 11, were found guilty of Bulger's murder at the Preston court on 24 November 1993, becoming the youngest convicted murderers of the 20th century. The judge, Mr Justice Morland, told Thompson and Venables that they had committed a crime of "unparalleled evil and barbarity ... In my judgment, your conduct was both cunning and very wicked." Morland sentenced them to be detained at Her Majesty's pleasure, with a recommendation that they should be kept in custody for "very, very many years to come", recommending a minimum term of eight years. At the close of the trial, the judge lifted reporting restrictions and allowed the names of the killers to be released, saying: "I did this because the public interest overrode the interest of the defendants ... There was a need for an informed public debate on crimes committed by young children." David Omand later criticised this decision and outlined the difficulties created by it in his 2010 review of the probation service's handling of the case.

=== Post-trial ===
Shortly after the trial, and after the judge had recommended a minimum sentence of eight years, Lord Taylor of Gosforth, the Lord Chief Justice, recommended that the two boys should serve a minimum of ten years, which would have made them eligible for release in February 2003 at the age of 20. The editors of The Sun handed a petition bearing nearly 280,000 signatures to Michael Howard, the Home Secretary, in a bid to increase the time spent by both boys in custody. This campaign was successful, and Howard announced in July 1994 that the boys would be kept in custody for a minimum of 15 years, meaning that they would not be considered for release until February 2008, by which time they would be 25 years old.

Lord Donaldson criticised Howard's intervention, describing the increased tariff as "institutionalised vengeance ... [by] a politician playing to the gallery". The increased minimum term was overturned in 1997 by the House of Lords that ruled it "unlawful" for the Home Secretary to decide on minimum sentences for young offenders. The High Court of Justice and European Court of Human Rights have since ruled that although the parliament may set minimum and maximum terms for individual categories of crime, it is the responsibility of the trial judge, with the benefit of all the evidence and argument from both prosecution and defence counsel, to determine the minimum term in individual criminal cases.

Tony Blair, then Shadow Home Secretary, gave a speech in Wellingborough during which he said: "We hear of crimes so horrific they provoke anger and disbelief in equal proportions ... These are the ugly manifestations of a society that is becoming unworthy of that name." The Prime Minister, John Major, said that "society needs to condemn a little more and understand a little less." The trial judge Mr Justice Morland stated that exposure to violent videos might have encouraged the actions of Thompson and Venables; this was disputed by David Maclean, the Minister of State at the Home Office at the time, who said that police had found no evidence linking the case with "video nasties".

Some British tabloid newspapers claimed the attack on Bulger was inspired by the film Child's Play 3, specifically a scene depicting the doll Chucky being splattered with blue paint during a paintball game. This led them to campaign for tighter regulations on "video nasties". The police investigation found that Child's Play 3 was among the films that Venables's father had rented in the months prior to the killing, but there was no evidence that Venables himself ever watched it. Investigators reviewed some 200 titles rented by the Venables family and concluded that there was "nothing—no scene, or plot, or dialogue—where you could put your finger on the freeze button and say that influenced a boy to go out and commit murder." Inspector Ray Simpson of Merseyside Police commented: "If you are going to link this murder to a film, you might as well link it to The Railway Children." Despite the police's findings, the intense public debate surrounding media influence contributed to the Criminal Justice and Public Order Act 1994, which clarified rules on the availability of certain types of video material to children.

=== Detention ===
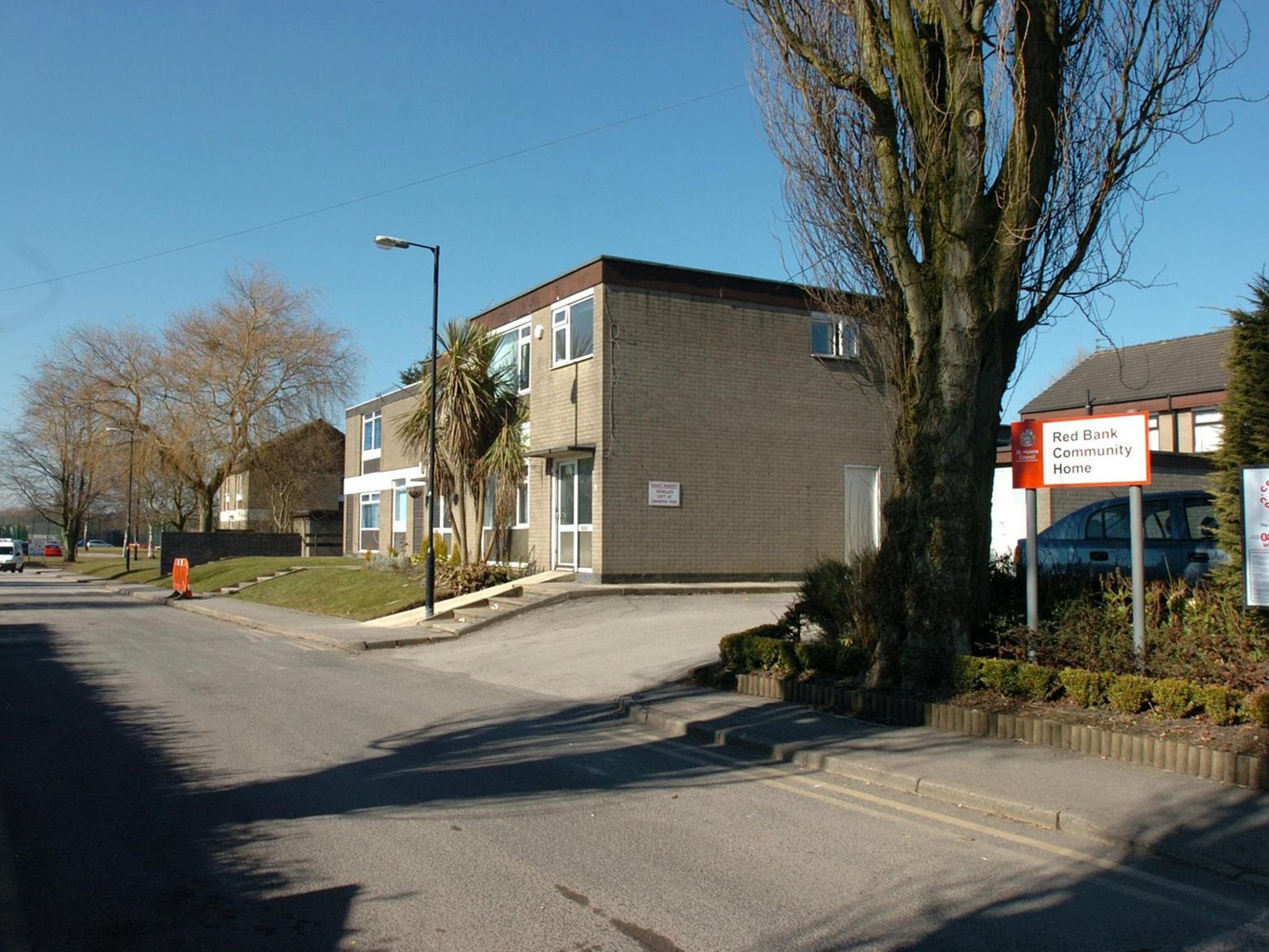
The Red Bank Secure Unit in 2022

Following the trial, Thompson was detained at Barton Moss Secure Children's Home, which was then known as Barton Moss Secure Care Centre, in Salford.

Venables was detained in Vardy House, a small eight-bed unit at Red Bank Secure Unit in Newton-le-Willows on Merseyside. These locations were not publicly known until after the boys' release. Details of the boys' lives were recorded twice daily on running sheets and signed by the member of staff who had written them; the records were stored at the units and copied to officials in Whitehall.

The boys were taught to conceal their real names and the true nature of the crime they had committed. Venables's parents regularly visited their son at Red Bank, as did Thompson's mother, every three days, at Barton Moss. The boys received education and rehabilitation; despite initial problems, Venables was said to have eventually made good progress at Red Bank, resulting in him being kept there for the full eight years, despite the facility only being a short-stay remand unit.

Both boys were reported to suffer post-traumatic stress disorder, and Venables in particular told of experiencing nightmares and flashbacks of the murder.

=== Appeal and release ===
In 1999, lawyers for Thompson and Venables appealed to the European Court of Human Rights that the boys' trial had not been impartial, since they were too young to follow proceedings and understand an adult court. The court dismissed their claim that the trial was inhuman and degrading treatment but upheld their claim they were denied a fair trial by the nature of the court proceedings. The court also held that the Home Secretary's intervention had led to a "highly charged atmosphere", which resulted in an unfair judgment. On 15 March 1999, the court in Strasbourg ruled by 14 votes to five that there had been a violation of Article 6 of the European Convention on Human Rights; regarding the fairness of the trial, they stated: "The public trial process in an adult court must be regarded in the case of an 11-year-old child as a severely intimidating procedure."

In September 1999, Bulger's parents appealed to the European Court of Human Rights but failed to persuade the court that a victim of a crime has the right to be involved in determining the sentence of the perpetrator. The European Court case led to the new Lord Chief Justice, Harry Woolf, reviewing the minimum sentence. In October 2000, he recommended the tariff be reduced from ten to eight years, adding that Her Majesty's Young Offender Institution was a "corrosive atmosphere" for the juveniles.

In June 2001, after a six-month review, the Parole Board ruled that Thompson and Venables were no longer a threat to public safety and could be released, as their minimum tariff had expired in February of that year. The Home Secretary, David Blunkett, approved the decision, and they were released a few weeks later on life licence after serving eight years. It was reported that under a programme similar to witness protection, Thompson and Venables were given new identities and relocated to undisclosed locations. This was supported by the fabrication of passports, national insurance numbers, qualification certificates, and medical records. Blunkett added his own conditions to their licence and insisted on being sent daily updates on their actions.

The terms of their release included the following: They were not allowed to contact each other or Bulger's family; they were prohibited from visiting the Merseyside region; curfews were imposed on them, and they were obliged to report to probation officers. If they breached the rules or were deemed a risk to the public, they could be returned to prison.

A court injunction was imposed on the media after the trial, preventing the publication of details about Thompson and Venables. The worldwide injunction was kept in force following their release on parole, so their new identities and locations could not be published. In 2001, Blunkett stated: "The injunction was granted because there was a real and strong possibility that their lives would be at risk if their identities became known."

== Aftermath ==
=== Divorce of James Bulger's parents ===
In the months after the trial, and following the birth of their second son, the marriage of Bulger's parents, Ralph and Denise, broke down; they divorced in 1995.

Denise Bulger later married Stuart Fergus, with whom she had two sons. Ralph Bulger also remarried, and had three daughters with his second wife.

=== Bulger memorial and legal activism ===
On 14 March 2008, an appeal to set up a Red Balloon Learner Centre in Merseyside in memory of James Bulger was launched by his mother and Esther Rantzen. A memorial garden in Bulger's memory was created in Sacred Heart Primary School in his hometown of Kirkby, the school he would have been expected to attend had he not been murdered.

In March 2010, a call was made by England's Children's commissioner Maggie Atkinson to raise the age of criminal responsibility from ten to twelve. She said that the killers of James Bulger should have undergone "programmes" to help turn their lives around, rather than being prosecuted. The Ministry of Justice rejected the call, saying that children over the age of ten knew the difference "between bad behaviour and serious wrongdoing".

=== Vandalism of Bulger's grave ===
On 26 February 2026, a woman walking her dog near Kirkdale Cemetery reported two smashed cherub statues next to Bulger's headstone. The incident is being investigated by the Merseyside Police. A GoFundMe page launched by Bulger's mother Denise for the repairs raised over £15,000.

=== Court protective injunction and violations ===
During Venables's and Thompson's incarcerations, the court order protecting their identities was renewed, but details about them, both real and fabricated, gradually leaked into the press via the Internet.

==== Early reports about prison life ====
The Observer revealed that both Venables and Thompson had passed their GCSEs and A-Levels during their sentences. The paper also stated that the Bulger family's lawyers had consulted psychiatric experts in order to present the parole panel with a report that suggested Thompson was an undiagnosed psychopath, citing his lack of remorse during his trial and arrest. That report was ultimately dismissed; however, Thompson's lack of remorse at the time, in stark contrast to Venables, led to considerable scrutiny from the parole panel.

Upon release, both Thompson and Venables had lost all trace of their Scouse accents.

In a psychiatric report prepared in 2000 before Venables's release, he was described as posing a "trivial" risk to the public and unlikely to reoffend. The chances of his successful rehabilitation were described as "very high".

The Manchester Evening News published details that suggested the names of the secure institutions in which the pair were housed, in breach of the injunction against publicity that had been renewed early in 2001. In December that year, the paper was fined £30,000 for contempt of court and ordered to pay costs of £120,000. No significant publication or vigilante action against Thompson or Venables has occurred. Despite this, Bulger's mother, Denise, told how in 2004 she received a tip-off from an anonymous source that helped her locate Thompson. Upon seeing him, she was "paralysed with hatred", and was unable to confront him.

In April 2007, documents released under the Freedom of Information Act 2000 confirmed that the Home Office had spent £13,000 on an injunction to prevent a foreign magazine from revealing the new identities of Thompson and Venables.

==== False identification and Internet trolling ====
In April 2010, a 19-year-old man from the Isle of Man was given a three-month suspended prison sentence for falsely claiming in a Facebook message that one of his former colleagues was Thompson. In passing sentence, Deputy High Bailiff Alastair Montgomerie said that the teenager had "put that person at significant risk of serious harm" and in a "perilous position" by making the allegation.

In March 2012, a 26-year-old man from Chorley, Lancashire, was arrested after allegedly setting up a Facebook group with the title "What happened to Jamie Bulger was fucking hilarious". The man's computer was seized for further investigations.

==== Internet photo posts ====
On 25 February 2013, the Attorney General's Office announced that it was instituting contempt of court proceedings against several people who had allegedly published photographs online showing Thompson or Venables as adults. A spokesman commented:

"There are many different images circulating online claiming to be of Venables or Thompson; potentially innocent individuals may be wrongly identified as being one of the two men and placed in danger. The order, and its enforcement, is therefore intended to protect not only Venables and Thompson, but also those members of the public who have been incorrectly identified as being one of the two men."

On 26 April 2013, two men received suspended jail sentences of nine months after admitting to contempt of court, by publishing photographs that they claimed to be of Venables and Thompson on Facebook and Twitter. The posts were seen by 24,000 people. According to BBC legal correspondent Clive Coleman, the purpose of the prosecution was to ensure that the public was aware that Internet users were also subject to the law of contempt.

On 27 November 2013, a man from Liverpool received a 14-month suspended prison sentence for posting images on Twitter claiming to show Venables.

On 31 January 2019, a man and a woman pleaded guilty to eight contempt-of-court offences at the High Court after they admitted to posting photos on social media that they claimed identified Venables; both received suspended prison sentences. In March 2019, actress Tina Malone was given an eight-month suspended prison sentence for posting Venables's alleged identity on Facebook.

In January 2020, a 53-year-old woman from Ammanford in South Wales received a prison sentence of eight months, suspended for 15 months: in November 2017, she had published an alleged photograph of Venables on Facebook, with the advice "share this as much as possible". Lord Justice Nigel Davis said that the offence was "close to the line" for an immediate prison sentence, but suspended the sentence after observing an early admission of guilt and remorse by the woman.

=== Trolling and stalking of Bulger's mother ===
On 14 July 2016, a woman from Margate in Kent was jailed for three years after sending Twitter messages to Bulger's mother, in which she posed as one of his killers, and as Bulger's ghost. The sentence was reduced to 2 1/2 years on appeal.

On 25 October 2016, a man was jailed for 26 weeks for stalking Denise Fergus; he had previously received a police warning for stalking her in 2008.

=== Later life of Jon Venables ===
==== Relationships ====
Shortly before Venables' 2001 release, when he was aged 17, a woman who worked at the Red Bank Secure Unit where he was held allegedly had sex with him. In April 2011, in the aftermath of his 2010 imprisonment, these allegations were outlined in a Sunday Times Magazine article written by David James Smith, who had been following the Bulger case since the 1993 trial, and again later in a BBC documentary titled Jon Venables: What went wrong? The female staff member was suspended for sexual misconduct; she never returned to work at Red Bank. A spokesman for St Helens Council denied that the incident had been covered up, saying, "All allegations were thoroughly investigated by an independent team on the orders of the Home Office and chaired by Arthur de Frischling, a retired prison governor."

==== Misdemeanours while on release 2002–2008 ====
Venables began living independently in March 2002. Some time thereafter, he began a relationship with a woman who had a five-year-old child; it is not known whether Venables had already begun downloading child abuse images at the time of dating the woman, although he denies having ever met the child.

After a period of apparently reduced supervision, Venables began excessively drinking, taking drugs, and downloading child abuse images, as well as visiting Merseyside, which was a breach of his licence. In September 2008, Venables was arrested on suspicion of affray, following a fight outside a nightclub; he claimed he was acting in self-defence, and the charges were later dropped after he agreed to go on an alcohol-awareness course. Three months later, he was found to be in possession of cocaine; he was subjected to a curfew.

In 2005, when Venables was age 23, his probation officer met another girlfriend of his, who was aged 17. After a number of "young girlfriends", it was presumed that Venables was having a delayed adolescence. In 2008, a new probation officer said that Venables spent "a great deal of leisure time" playing video games and on the Internet.

==== 2010 imprisonment ====
Venables contacted his probation officer in February 2010, reporting that he feared that his new identity had been compromised at his place of work. When the officer arrived at his flat, Venables was attempting to remove or destroy the hard drive of his computer with a knife and a tin opener. The officer's suspicions were aroused, and the computer was taken away for examination leading to the discovery of the child sexual abuse material, which included children as young as two being raped by adults, and penetrative rape of seven- or eight-year-olds.

On 2 March 2010, the Ministry of Justice revealed that Venables had been returned to prison for an unspecified violation of the terms of his licence of release. Justice Secretary Jack Straw stated that Venables had been returned to prison because of "extremely serious allegations", and stated that he was "unable to give further details of the reasons for Jon Venables's return to custody, because it was not in the public interest to do so". On 7 March, media reports said that he had been accused of offences related to possession of child sexual abuse material.

In a statement to the House of Commons on 8 March 2010, Straw reiterated that it was "not in the interest of justice" to reveal the reason why Venables had been returned to custody. Baroness Butler-Sloss, the judge who made the decision to grant Venables anonymity in 2001, warned that Venables could be killed if his identity was revealed.

Bulger's mother, Denise Fergus, said she was angry that the parole board did not tell her that Venables had been returned to prison, and called for his anonymity to be removed if he was charged with a crime. A spokesperson for the Ministry of Justice stated that there was a worldwide injunction against publication of either killer's location or new identity. Venables's return to prison revived a false claim that a man from Fleetwood, Lancashire, was Venables. While the claim was reported and dismissed in September 2005, it reappeared in March 2010 when it was circulated widely via text messages and Facebook. Chief Inspector Tracie O'Gara of Lancashire Constabulary stated: "An individual who was targeted four-and-a-half years ago was not Jon Venables, and now he has left the area."

On 21 June 2010, Venables was charged with possession and distribution of indecent images of children. It was alleged that he had downloaded 57 indecent images of children over a 12-month period to February 2010, and had allowed other people to access the files through a peer-to-peer network. Venables faced two charges under the Protection of Children Act 1978. On 23 July, Venables appeared at a court hearing at the Old Bailey via a video link, visible only to the judge hearing the case. He pleaded guilty to charges of downloading and distributing child sexual abuse material, and was sentenced to two years' imprisonment. At the court hearing, it emerged that Venables had posed in online chat rooms as 35-year-old Dawn "Dawnie" Smith, a supposedly married woman from Liverpool, who boasted about abusing her eight-year-old daughter, in the hope of obtaining further child sexual abuse material.

The judge, Mr Justice David Bean, ruled that Venables's new identity could not be revealed, but the media were allowed to report that he had been living in Cheshire at the time of his arrest. The High Court also heard that Venables had been arrested on suspicion of affray in September 2008, following a drunken street fight with another man. Later that year, he was cautioned for possession of cocaine. In November 2010, a review of the National Probation Service handling of the case by David Omand found that probation officers could not have prevented Venables from downloading child sexual abuse material. Harry Fletcher, the assistant general secretary of the National Association of Probation Officers, said that only 24-hour surveillance would have stopped Venables. Venables was eligible for parole in July 2011. On 27 June 2011, the parole board decided that he would remain in custody, and that his parole would not be considered again for at least another year.

==== 2011 new identity ====
On 4 May 2011, it was reported that Venables would once again be given a new identity, following what was described as a "serious security breach", which revealed an identity that he had been using before his imprisonment in 2010; details of the breach could not be reported for legal reasons. A spokesman for the Ministry of Justice commented: "Such a change of identity is extremely rare, and granted only when the police assess that there is clear and credible evidence of a sustained threat to the offender's life on release into the community." The incident occurred after a man from Exeter posted photographs on a website devoted to identifying paedophiles, allegedly showing Venables as an adult, and revealing his name.

==== 2013 parole hearing and release ====
In November 2011, it was reported that officials had decided that Venables would stay in prison for the foreseeable future, as he would be likely to reveal his true identity if released. A Ministry of Justice spokesman declined to comment on the reports. On 4 July 2013, it was reported that the Parole Board for England and Wales had approved the release of Venables. On 3 September 2013, it was reported that Venables had been released from prison.

==== 2017 imprisonment ====
On 23 November 2017, it was reported that Venables had again been recalled to prison for possession of more child sexual abuse imagery. The Ministry of Justice declined to comment on the reports. On 5 January 2018, Venables was charged with unspecified offences relating to indecent images of children. On 7 February 2018, Venables pleaded guilty to possession of indecent images of children for a second time. He pleaded guilty via video link to three charges of making indecent images of children, and one of possessing a "paedophile manual", that included advice for would-be child molesters, including instructions on child grooming and evading detection. He was sentenced to three years and four months in prison. In September 2020, he was denied parole. On 13 December 2023, Venables was again denied parole, with the Parole Board saying that "The panel was not satisfied that release at this point would be safe for the protection of the public."

==== 2019 legal challenge to lift anonymity refused ====
On 4 March 2019, Bulger's father, Ralph, lost a legal challenge to lift the lifelong order protecting Venables's anonymity. Judge Andrew McFarlane turned down the request, saying that the "uniquely notorious" nature of the case meant there is "a strong possibility, if not a probability, that if his identity were known, he would be pursued, resulting in grave and possibly fatal consequences."

==== Potential overseas resettlement ====
In late June 2019, it was reported that British officials had considered resettling Venables in Canada, Australia, or New Zealand, due to the high costs behind protecting his anonymity. British authorities had reportedly spent £65,000 in legal fees to keep Venables's identity a secret. In response to media coverage, New Zealand prime minister Jacinda Ardern remarked that, due to his criminal history, Venables would need an exemption under the New Zealand Immigration Act 2009, and that he should "not bother" applying.

==== 2026 parole hearing ====
In January 2026, it was reported that Venables would have a new parole hearing. Denise Fergus was granted permission to attend the hearing. In July 2026, Venables launched a legal challenge to block Denise and Ralph Bulger from attending, refusing to attend or participate in the hearing if they did. His legal team argued that the parents' presence would cause him "psychological harm". Denise demanded that the hearing be held in public.. On 9 November 2026, it was reported that Venables had again been denied parole, and ordered to serve at least two more years in prison.

=== Later life of Robert Thompson ===
Thompson has not reoffended since being released on license in 2001, age 18.

== In popular culture ==
=== Theatre ===
In August 2001, Peter Morris's The Age of Consent was performed at the Edinburgh Festival Fringe. The play featured an 18-year-old character called Timmy, who was due to be released from a secure unit after luring a toddler away from his mother and beating him to death.

The play generated controversy due to the similarities between the character and James's killers. Although she had not seen the play, Denise Fergus denounced it as a work that was "just designed to try and shock people and grab publicity" and that "anyone who would stoop so low as to use my son's death as a subject for comedy is sick and pathetic." Morris stated that the humour in his play was "never at the expense of the various people, Mrs Fergus included, who have suffered so much in the aftermath of James's murder". He commented that the work "is emphatically not a comedy" but instead "intended as a serious moral examination of what contemporary society is doing to children".

In 2008, Swedish playwright Niklas Rådström used the interview transcripts from interrogations with the murderers and their families to recreate the story. His play, Monsters, opened at the Arcola Theatre in London in May 2009.

=== Film and television ===
In August 2009, Australia's Seven Network used real footage of Bulger's abduction to promote its crime drama City Homicide. The use of the footage was criticised by Bulger's mother, and Seven apologised. On 24 August, co-hosts on Seven's breakfast show Sunrise asked whether the killers were now living in Australia, in an apparent tie-in with that week's episode of City Homicide. The following day they relayed the Australian government's denial that the killers had been settled in the country.

A December 2009 storyline of the British soap opera Hollyoaks was to feature Loretta Jones and her friend Chrissy, who were given new identities after being convicted of murdering a child at the age of 12. The episode was cancelled after the series makers gave Denise Fergus a private screening.

In January 2019, the short film Detainment was nominated for Best Live Action Short Film at the 91st Academy Awards. The film is based on transcripts of the police interviews with Thompson and Venables after their arrests. Bulger's mother was not consulted before the film's release. She criticised its nomination and circulated a petition to have the film removed from the nominations. Director Vincent Lambe refused to withdraw the film from consideration, saying that "it would defeat the purpose of making the film".

=== Video games ===
In June 2007, the 2003 computer game based Law & Order: Double or Nothing was withdrawn from stores in the UK following reports that it contained the New Strand CCTV image of Bulger being led away by Thompson and Venables. The scene in the game involves a computer-generated detective pointing out the picture, which is meant to represent a fictional child abduction that the player is then asked to investigate. Bulger's family, along with many others, complained, and the game was subsequently withdrawn by its UK distributor, GSP. The game's developer, Legacy Interactive, released a statement in which it apologised for the image's inclusion in the game, stating that it was "inadvertent" and done "without any knowledge of the crime [which was] minimally publicised in the United States".

=== Books ===
In 2010, the critical theorist Terry Eagleton introduced his book On Evil with the story of Bulger's murder.

== See also ==
- Edlington attacks
- Mary Bell
- Sharon Carr
- Murder of Brianna Ghey
- Murder of Alesha MacPhail
- Eric Smith
- Josh Phillips
