= Ralph Cusack =

Irish-born barrister and English High Court judge

Sir Ralph Vincent Cusack (13 April 1916 – 11 March 1978) was an Irish-born barrister and English High Court judge.

== Life ==
Cusack was born in Ireland, the son of Dora and John Cusack, KC, later a judge (d. 1940), who contested the seat of Newry as a Unionist at the January 1910 general election. One of his brothers, John Cusack, known as Jake (d. 1968), was Minister of the Interior of Kenya during the Mau Mau period. Another brother, Dermot, died in 1933 in a car accident.

Cusack was brought up in England. He was educated at King's College School and the University of London, as well as in Italy. He passed his LLB in 1939 and was called to the Bar from Gray's Inn in 1940. He then served during World War II in the British Army until 1946. In 1943-44 he was a Staff Captain, HQ Eastern Command, and with a promotion to major was Deputy Assistant Military Secretary at the War Office from 1944 to 1946, before resuming his legal career.

From 1953 to 1960 he was a member of the General Council of the Bar. In 1960 he became a Queen's Counsel. He was Recorder of Gloucester from 1961 to 1964, and Recorder of Wolverhampton from 1964 to 1966, the year in which he was appointed a High Court judge, in succession to Mr Justice Elwes. He was assigned to the Queen's Bench Division. In the same year he was knighted, and elected a bencher of Gray's Inn.

Among his more notable cases, in 1962 he successfully defended two journalists who had refused to disclose their sources of information to the Vassall Tribunal. In 1968 he was judge in the Mary Bell trial at Newcastle upon Tyne.

He died suddenly in March 1978. His obituary in The Times described him as "the ideal judge... almost always being right and leaving the litigants thinking that he had been." He was unmarried.
