= Cumberlow Lodge =

Victorian building and remand home in South Norwood, England

Map of Cumberlow Lodge in 1933.

Cumberlow Lodge Remand Home (Note: Also known originally as Cumberlow and, later on, as Cumberlow Lodge Classifying Centre for Girls.) was a Victorian mansion and later children's institution in South Norwood, Croydon, England. Originally built around 1878 as the private residence of local inventor William Stanley, the house occupied a six-acre site on a former brickfield land between Lancaster Road and Chalfont Road. The building was used as an approved school for girls held on remand during the twentieth century before it was demolished in 2006.

== History ==
=== Construction ===
Cumberlow Lodge was designed and built c. 1878 (Note: The exact date of construction is unknown, but work may have begun as early as 1867 when Stanley first moved to South Norwood.) by inventor William Stanley as his personal residence. The house stood on a large landscaped estate in South Norwood—an area which underwent rapid suburban expansion during the late Victorian era. The site had previously been occupied by brickfields.

Stanley, founder of William Ford Stanley and Co. Ltd, also funded local philanthropic projects included Stanley Halls and the Stanley Technical Trade School. Following his death in 1909, the property passed to the Lewisham Poor Law Union, who adapted it into a receiving home for children entering public care under the Poor Law system.

=== Approved school and remand home ===
In 1930 the estate came under the administration of the London County Council. On 17 June 1935, Cumberlow was certified as an approved school, in accordance with the Children and Young Persons Act 1933, for senior girls aged between 15 and 17.

The school accommodated up to 30 pupils and provided vocational training, including gardening and household management. During the Second World War, the school was evacuated to Addington Manor near Winslow, Buckinghamshire. Following the war, the institution returned to South Norwood but was closed in 1949.

In 1950, the premises re-opened as the Cumberlow Lodge Remand Home for Girls. The home initially accommodated 24 girls awaiting court proceedings, later expanding to 48 places. It also served as a classifying centre for girls, with an assessment and diagnosis facility which employed psychiatrists and educational psychologists.

Mary Bell, Britain's youngest female killer, was housed there in December 1968, although after protests from local residents she was moved to Wales. At the 1972 New Year Honours, Thomas Hart, the superintendent of the institution, was awarded an MBE.

Management of Cumberlow passed to Lambeth Borough Council and then to Croydon Borough Council. The institution was licensed as a remand homes for young offenders awaiting court decisions until at least 30 April 1989.

=== Closure and demolition ===
In 2006, the building was demolished shortly after the English Heritage had begun considering it for statutory protection. This led to local controversy over the building's local historical associations with William Stanley and South Norwood. Planning permission for a residential redevelopment of the site was granted in 2010.

The Independent Inquiry into Child Sexual Abuse published an investigative report on Lambeth Council in July 2021, which found that staff members had committed sexual abuse at facilities including Cumberlow during the 1970s.

== See also ==
- Approved school
- Remand home

== Bibliography ==
- Rose, Gordon (1967). Schools for Young Offenders: Institute for the Study and Treatment of Delinquency. London: Tavistock Publications.
- Hyland, Jim (1993). Yesterday's Answers: Development and Decline of Schools for Young Offenders. London: Whiting & Birch. ISBN 978-1-871177-38-1.
- Carlson, Jessamy (2024). Approved Schools for Girls in England, 1933–1973: 'Girls Will Be Girls'. Palgrave Macmillan. ISBN 978-3-031-65107-6.
