= Detainment (film) =

2018 film

- Film poster
- Directed by: Vincent Lambe
- Written by: Vincent Lambe
- Produced by: Robert Dwyer-Joyce; Vincent Lambe
- Starring: Ely Solan; Leon Hughes
- Cinematography: Patrick Jordan
- Edited by: Vincent Lambe
- Music by: Filip Sijanec
- Production company: Twelve Media
- Distributed by: Network Ireland Television; ShortsTV
- Release date: May 2018 (Cannes)
- Running time: 30 minutes
- Country: Ireland
- Language: English

Detainment is a 2018 Irish short drama film written and directed by Vincent Lambe, about the murder of James Bulger. It was nominated for the Best Live Action Short Film at the 91st Academy Awards.

== Plot ==
A re-enactment partially altered for dramatic purposes of the real-life event of what happened to 2-year-old James Bulger shows 10-year-old boys Jon Venables and Robert Thompson each asked questions in different Liverpool police stations about what happened to James. They constantly blame each other, and flashbacks are shown of their time together with James. Eventually, they are found guilty of murdering James, and both boys are arrested offscreen.

== Cast ==
- Ely Solan as Jon Venables
- Leon Hughes as Robert Thompson
- Caleb Mason as James Bulger
- Will O'Connell as Detective Dale
- David Ryan as Detective Scott
- Tara Breathnach as Susan Venables (Jon Venables’ mother)
- Killian Sheridan as Neil Venables (Jon Venables’ father)
- Kathy Monahan as Ann Thompson (Robert Thompson’s mother)
- Morgan C. Jones as Detective Roberts
- Martin Phillips as Laurence Lee (Jon Venables’ solicitor)
- Tom Pigot as Dominic Lloyd (Robert Thompson’s solicitor)
- Alan Buckley as Robert Thompson’s social worker
- Brian Fortune as Detective Jacobs

== Reception ==
Detainment has an 83% approval rating from critics on Rotten Tomatoes based on six reviews, and an average rating of 7.8/10. Malcolm Stevens, who oversaw the detention of the killers as the former Home Secretary's professional adviser, defended the making of the film in an editorial, saying that it raised questions regarding the treatment of young offenders which he felt "successive governments have striven to avoid".

Denise Fergus, the mother of James Bulger, condemned the film due to it being produced without her family's knowledge or consultation. Upon learning of the film's Academy Award nomination, Fergus launched a petition to have it disqualified, which amassed over 227,000 signatures. Fergus also personally asked Lambe to withdraw the film, but Lambe refused, stating that doing so would "defeat the purpose" of making it.
