= Vincent Lambe =

Irish film director, screenwriter and producer

- Born: 1 December 1980 (age 45); Dublin, Ireland
- Education: IADT
- Occupations: Film director, producer, writer
- Years active: 1999–present

Vincent Joseph Lambe (born 1 December 1980) is an Irish film director, screenwriter and producer. Lambe received acclaim for directing the 2018 short film Detainment, which is about the murder of James Bulger. The film earned him a 2019 Academy Award nomination.

Lambe is a graduate of the National Film School of Ireland, at the Dún Laoghaire Institute of Art, Design and Technology.

== Filmography ==
- After the War (1999, short film)
- Sacred (2000, short film)
- Broken Things (2002, short film)
- Detainment (2018, short film)
- Every Five Miles (2022, TV Movie)

== Awards and nominations ==
1999

- After the War
  - Fresh Film Festival: Short Film – won

2003

- Broken Things
  - Woods Hole Film Festival: Best Short / Drama – won
  - Dublin Film and Music Fleadh: Best Short Drama, Most Promising Director – won

2018

- Detainment
  - Winchester Film Festival: Best Foreign Short Film – won
  - Odense International Film Festival: Best International Film, Grand Prix - HCA Award – won
  - Richard Harris International Film Festival: Best Director, Best Overall Short Film – won
  - Krakow Film Festival: Don Quixote Award – won
  - Kerry Film Festival: Best Short Film – won
  - Irish Screen America: Rising Star Award – won
  - Cannes Lions International Festival of Creativity: Best Short Film, Special Jury Award – won

2019

- Detainment
  - Oscar: Best Live Action Short Film – nom
  - Clermont-Ferrand International Short Film Festival: Grand Prix – nom
