= Red Bank Secure Children's Home =

British secure children's home (juvenile detention facility)

Coordinates: 53.445545°N 2.612708°W

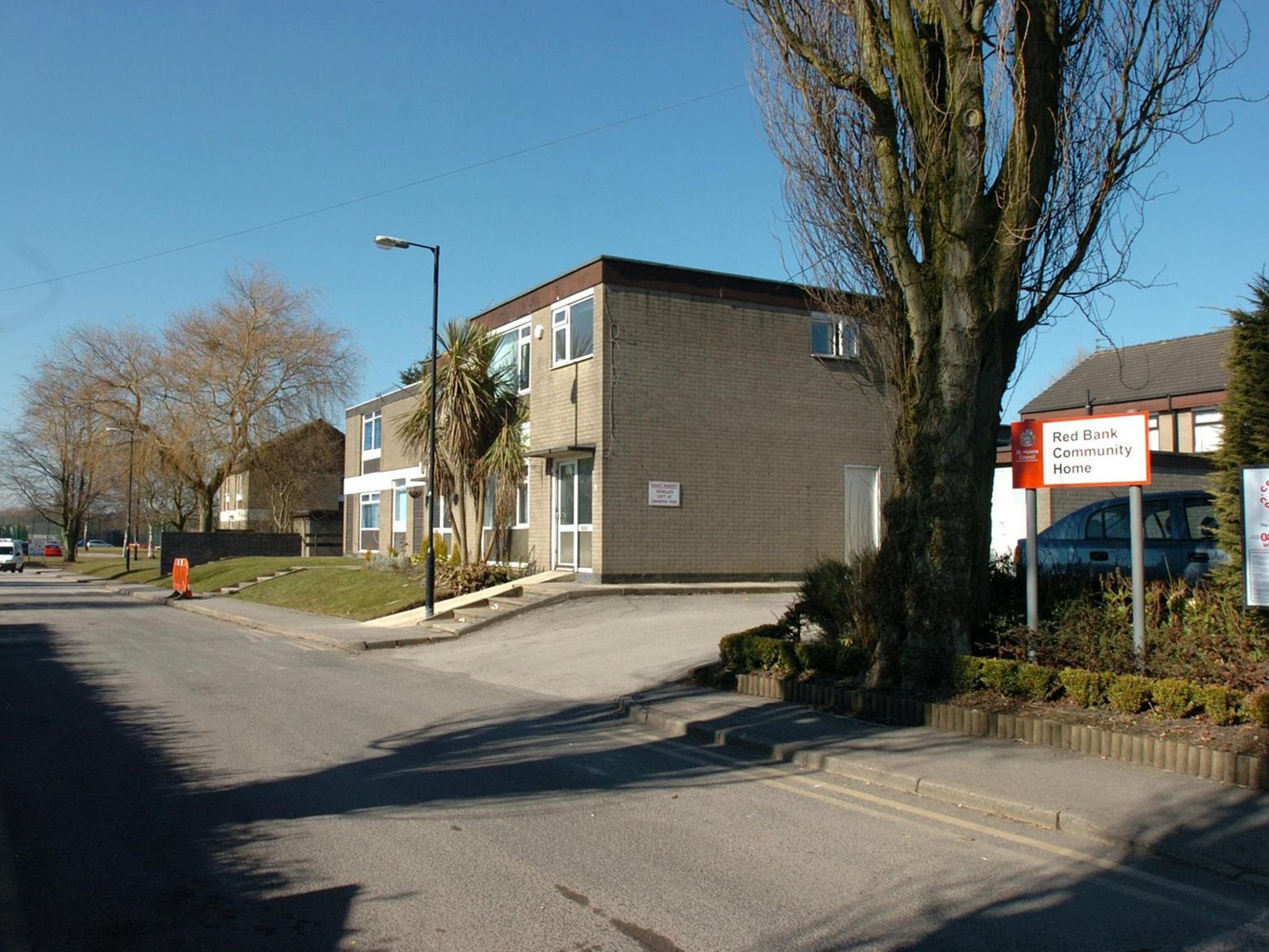
Front entrance of Red Bank, shortly before closure. It is now cordoned off by a security gate.

Red Bank Secure Unit (more commonly referred to as Red Bank), part of Red Bank Community Home, was one of several English Local Authority Secure Children's Homes (a juvenile detention facility) located in Newton-le-Willows, Merseyside. It opened in 1965, when it was one of three such units, and accepted both boys and girls. The unit closed in May 2015.

In 1990, when it housed 26 boys and young men convicted of serious crimes including murder, rape and arson, John Evans, the local member of parliament, described its work as "excellent and valuable" and said, "the special unit is not a harsh place, but it has rules that must be adhered to. The young people learn self-control and discipline in an affectionate environment that is sensitive to their special needs." It later specialised in accommodating child sex offenders. In 2009, it was one of nine secure children's homes in England.

It is now a school for children with Social, Emotional, and Mental Health (SEMH) needs called Willow Bank.

== Notable inmates ==
- Mary Bell, from 1968 to 1973. Bell was transferred to Red Bank secure unit where she was the only female among approximately 24 inmates. Bell would later claim that she was sexually abused by a member of staff and several inmates while incarcerated at this facility, claiming the sexual abuse began when she was 13.
- Jon Venables, from 1993 to 2001, in Vardy House, a small eight-bedded unit. Venables was one of James Bulger's killers. Despite the facility being a short-stay remand unit, Venables eventually made good progress at Red Bank after initial problems, resulting in him being kept there for eight years. Allegations that a female employee of the unit had engaged in sexual activity with Venables while he was imprisoned there were widely reported in 2011.
