= Mary Bell =

Britain's youngest female killer (born 1957)

- Bell c. 1967
- Born: 26 May 1957 (age 69); Corbridge, Northumberland, England
- Status: Released (1980)
- Other name: The Tyneside Strangler
- Children: 1
- Motive: Sadism; Rage
- Conviction: Manslaughter (×2)
- Penalty: Detained at Her Majesty's pleasure

Details
- Victims: 2
- Span of crimes: 25 May – 31 July 1968
- Locations: Scotswood, Newcastle upon Tyne, England
- Date apprehended: 7 August 1968; 58 years ago

Mary Flora Bell (born 26 May 1957) is an English woman who, as a juvenile, killed two preschool-age boys in Scotswood, an inner suburb of Newcastle upon Tyne, in 1968. Bell committed her first killing when she was ten years old. In both instances, Bell informed her victim that he had a sore throat, which she would massage before proceeding to strangle him.

Bell was convicted of manslaughter in relation to both killings in December 1968, in a trial held at Newcastle Assizes when she was 11 years old, and in which her actions were judged to have been committed under diminished responsibility. She is Britain's youngest female killer and was diagnosed with a psychopathic personality disorder prior to her trial. Her alleged accomplice in at least one of the killings, 13-year-old Norma Joyce Bell (no relation), was acquitted of all charges.

Bell was released from custody in 1980, at the age of 23. A lifelong court order granted her anonymity, which has since been extended to protect the identity of her daughter and granddaughter. She has since lived under a series of pseudonyms.

== Early life ==
Mary Bell's mother, Elizabeth "Betty" Bell (née McCrickett), was a well-known local prostitute who was often absent from the family home, frequently travelling to Glasgow to work, and simply leaving her children in the care of their father—if he was present in the household. Mary was her second child, born when Betty was 17 years old. The identity of Mary's biological father is debated. For most of her life, Mary believed her father to be William "Billy" Bell, a violent alcoholic and habitual criminal with an arrest record for crimes including armed robbery. However, she was a baby when William Bell married her mother, and it is unknown if he is her actual biological father.

Mary was an unwanted and neglected child. According to her aunt, Isa McCrickett, within minutes of Mary's birth, her mother had resented hospital staff attempting to place her daughter in her arms, shouting: "Take the thing away from me!"

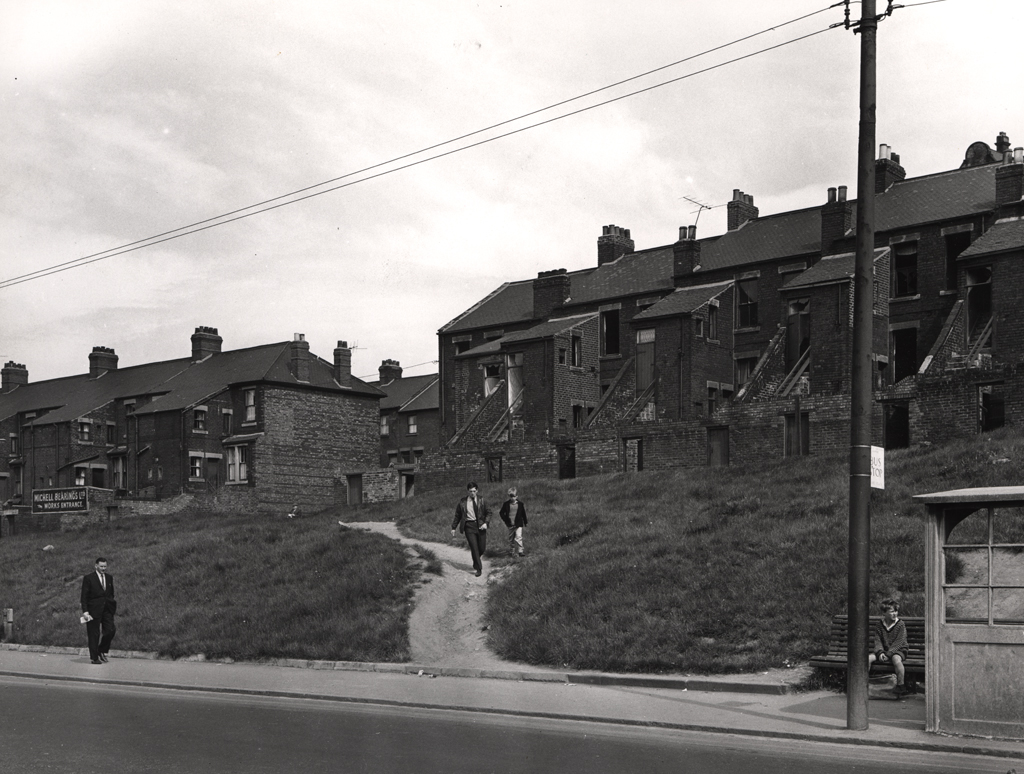
Whitehouse Road, seen here in 1966. Mary Bell lived at 70 Whitehouse Road.

As a baby, toddler, and young child, Mary frequently suffered injuries in household accidents while alone with her mother, which led her family to believe that either her mother was deliberately negligent, or intentionally attempting to harm or kill her daughter. On one occasion in about 1960, Betty dropped her daughter from a first-floor window; on another occasion, she plied her daughter with sleeping pills. She is also known to have once sold Mary through an adoption agency to a mentally unstable woman who was unable to have children of her own, resulting in her older sister, Catherine, having to travel alone across Newcastle to reclaim Mary from this individual and return the child to her mother's home on Whitehouse Road.

Despite her negligence and abuse of her child, Betty refused repeated offers from her family to take custody of Mary, whom she—as a dominatrix—is alleged to have begun allowing and/or encouraging several of her clients to sexually abuse in sadomasochistic sessions by the mid-1960s. Mary's mother actively participated in several of these sessions, including several in which she blindfolded her daughter with a stocking before restraining her hands behind her back and forcing her to perform oral sex upon her clients.

=== Temperament ===
Both at home and at school, Mary exhibited numerous signs of disturbed and unpredictable behaviour, including sudden mood swings and chronic bed wetting. She is known to have frequently fought with other children—both boys and girls—and to have attempted to strangle or suffocate her classmates or playmates on several occasions. On one occasion, she is known to have attempted to block the trachea of a young girl with sand. This violent behaviour made many children reluctant to socialise with Mary, who would frequently spend her free time with Norma Joyce Bell, the 13-year-old daughter of a next-door neighbour, with whom she had become acquainted in early 1967. Although the girls shared the same surname, they were not related.

According to one classmate at Delaval Road Junior School, by 1968 she and her peers had become accustomed to the sudden and marked changes in Mary's behaviour, and when she began exhibiting distressful mannerisms—including shaking her head and forming a steely gaze—her peers instinctively knew she was to become violent, with the focus of her stare being the individual she would attack.

=== Initial assaults ===
On Saturday 11 May 1968, a three-year-old boy was discovered wandering dazed and bleeding in the vicinity of St. Margaret's Road, Scotswood. The child later informed police he had been playing with Mary Bell and Norma Bell atop a disused air raid shelter when he had been pushed 7 ft (2.1 m) from the roof to the ground, inflicting a severe laceration to his head. He was unsure of which one of the girls had actually pushed him. The same evening, the parents of three small girls contacted police to complain that both Mary and Norma had attempted to strangle their children as they played in a sandpit.

That evening, both girls were interviewed about these incidents. Both girls denied any culpability for the air raid shelter incident, claiming they had simply discovered the boy bleeding heavily from a head wound after he had fallen. Further questioned about the attempted strangulation of the three young girls, Mary denied any knowledge of the incident. However, Norma admitted Mary had tried to "throttle" each of the girls, stating:

Mary went to one of the girls and said, 'What happens if you choke someone; do they die?' Then Mary put both hands 'round the girl's throat and squeezed. The girl started to go purple. I told Mary to stop, but she wouldn't. Then she put her hands around Pauline's throat and she started going purple as well ... another girl, Susan Cornish, came up and Mary did the same thing to her.

Police notified the local authority of the incidents and of Mary's violent nature; however, due to their age, both girls were simply given a warning. No further action was taken.

== Killings ==
=== Background ===
In the 1960s, Newcastle upon Tyne experienced a significant urban renewal project. Many inner boroughs of the city saw Victorian-era terraced slums demolished in order that modern houses and flats could be constructed, although several families resided in buildings earmarked for demolition as they awaited rehousing by the council.

Local children frequently played in or close to the derelict houses and upon the rubble-strewn expanses of land razed and partially cleared by contractors. One of these locations was a large expanse of waste ground located close to a railway line known to local children as the "Tin Lizzie". The street which ran parallel to this expanse of waste ground was St. Margaret's Road.

=== Martin Brown ===
On 25 May 1968, the day before her 11th birthday, Bell strangled four-year-old Martin Brown in an upstairs bedroom of a derelict house located at 85 St. Margaret's Road. She is believed to have committed this crime alone. Brown's body was discovered by three children at approximately 3:30 p.m. He was lying on his back with his arms stretched above his head. Aside from specks of blood and foam around his mouth, no signs of violence were visible upon his body. A local workman named John Hall soon arrived on the scene; he attempted to perform cardiopulmonary resuscitation (CPR), to no avail.

As Hall attempted CPR, Mary Bell and Norma Bell appeared at the doorway to the bedroom. Both were quickly shooed out of the house; the two knocked on the door of Martin's aunt, Rita Finlay, and informed her: "One of your sisters' bairns has just had an accident. We think it's Martin, but we can't tell because there's blood all over him."

The following day, Bernard Knight conducted a post-mortem upon the body of Martin Brown. Knight was unable to find any signs of violence on the child's body, and thus was unable to determine the child's cause of death, although he was able to discount the investigators' theory the child had died of poisoning through ingesting tablets. (Note: Police had discovered several empty pill bottles inside the abandoned house where Brown's body was discovered, including one close to his body.) An inquest on 7 June returned an open verdict.

One of the four handwritten notes left by Mary Bell and Norma Bell at Woodland Crescent nursery on 26 May 1968.

=== Intervening incidents ===
On Mary's 11th birthday, 26 May, she and Norma broke into and vandalised a nursery in nearby Woodland Crescent. The two entered the premises by peeling tiles off the slate roof; they tore books, upturned desks, and smeared ink and poster paints about the property before escaping. The following day, staff discovered the break-in and vandalism and immediately notified the police, who also discovered four separate notes that claimed responsibility for Martin Brown's murder. One of these notes stated: "I murder SO That I may come back"; another read: "WE did murder martain brown fuckof you Bastard"; a third note simply read: "Fuch off we murder. Watch out Fanny and Faggot." The final note was the most complex, reading: "You ArE micey y BEcuASE WE murdErd MArtain GO Brown you BEttER Look out THERE are Murders aBout By FAnny AND and auld Faggot you screws." The police dismissed this incident as a tasteless and childish prank. (Note: One of these four notes had been placed at the base of a telephone within the nursery; the other three were found in classrooms.)

Mary Bell (right), pictured holding a banner protesting the hazardous conditions of derelict houses in Scotswood, June 1968.

Two days later, on 29 May, shortly before the funeral of Martin Brown, in a game of chicken, both girls called upon the house of his mother, June, asking to see her son. When June Brown replied that they could not see her son because he was deceased, Mary replied: "Oh, I know he's dead; I want to see him in his coffin."

=== Brian Howe ===
On the afternoon of 31 July 1968, a three-year-old named Brian Howe was last seen by his parents in the street outside his house playing with one of his siblings, the family dog, and Mary Bell and Norma Bell. When he did not return home later that afternoon, concerned relatives and neighbours searched the streets without success. At 11:10 p.m., a search party discovered Brian's body between two large concrete blocks upon the "Tin Lizzie".

The first policeman to arrive at the scene observed that a "deliberate but feeble" attempt had been made to conceal the body, which was covered in clumps of grass and weeds. Cyanosis was evident upon the child's lips, and several bruises and scratches were evident upon his neck. A pair of broken scissors lay close to his feet.

The coroner would conclude that Brian had died of strangulation, and that he had been dead for up to seven-and-a-half hours before the discovery of his body. The killer had evidently squeezed Brian's nostrils closed with one hand as he or she had gripped his throat with the other. Numerous puncture wounds had been inflicted to the child's legs before death, sections of his hair had been cut from his head, his genitals had been partially mutilated, and a crude attempt had been made to carve the initial "M" into his stomach. (Note: Investigators later discovered that both girls had returned to Brian's body shortly after his death, with Norma lightly carving her initial "N" into the boy's abdomen. This initial was subsequently amended by Mary to read the letter "M" using a distinctive pair of broken and bent scissors and a razor blade, which she also used to cut off some of his hair. The razor blade was concealed at the scene.) The relatively small amount of force used to murder the child led the coroner to conclude the killer was another child.

Numerous grey and maroon fibres were discovered upon Brian's clothing and shoes. These fibres did not source from any clothing within the Howe household, and had been transferred to the child by his killer or killers.

== Investigation ==
The discovery of Brian Howe's body sparked a large-scale manhunt. Over one hundred detectives from across Northumberland were assigned to the investigation, and more than 1,200 children had been questioned with regard to their whereabouts by 2 August. Two children questioned by detectives on 1 August were Mary Bell and Norma Bell who, witnesses informed investigators, had been seen playing with Brian shortly before he was believed to have died. In her initial interview, Norma seemed excitable, whereas Mary was markedly more observant and taciturn. Although both girls were evasive and contradictory in their initial statements, they freely admitted to having played with Brian on the date of his death, but denied having seen him after lunchtime.

Questioned further the following day, Mary stated she remembered seeing an eight-year-old local boy playing with Brian on the afternoon of 31 July, and that she had also seen him hitting the child. Furthermore, she stated she also remembered that the boy had been covered in grass and weeds as if he had been rolling in a field, and that he had in his possession a small pair of scissors. Mary then expounded: "I saw him trying to cut a cat's tail off with the scissors, but there was something wrong with them—one leg was broken or bent." This self-incriminating statement convinced Detective Chief Inspector (DCI) James Dobson that Mary was the actual killer, as only the police knew about the broken scissors found at the crime scene. In addition, the local boy she named was quickly questioned, and was discovered to have been at Newcastle International Airport on the afternoon of 31 July, with numerous witnesses able to corroborate his parents' claims.

=== First confession ===
On the afternoon of 4 August, the parents of Norma Bell contacted police, stating their daughter wished to confess what she knew of the death of Brian Howe. DCI Dobson arrived at their home, formally cautioned Norma, then asked what she knew. Norma then informed Dobson; Mary had taken her to a "spot on the 'Tin Lizzie'" waste ground, at which point she had been shown Brian's body. Mary had then demonstrated to her how she had strangled the child. According to Norma, Mary had confessed to her she had enjoyed strangling the child, before describing how she had inflicted the scour marks to his stomach with a razor blade—which had been hidden at the crime scene—and "the broken scissors". Norma then led police to the crime scene and revealed the location where the razor blade was hidden. A drawing Norma made of the wounds inflicted to the boy's abdomen precisely matched those described by the coroner.

May then said, "The blocks Norma, howay," and we went along to the (concrete) blocks. Then May said to Brian, "Lift up your neck." Just when she said that there were some boys playing around and Lassie, Brian Howe's dog, was barking. She had followed us down. May then said, "Get away or I'll set the dog on you!" The boys went away. May said to Brian again, "Lift up your neck."

— Section of Norma Bell's confession to police. 4 August 1968.

Mary Bell was visited at her home in the early hours of 5 August. On this occasion, she was notably defensive when confronted with the discrepancies in her previous statement, informing detectives: "You're trying to brainwash me. I will get a solicitor to get me out of this."

Later the same day, Norma was questioned again. On this occasion, she made a full statement in which she admitted being present when Mary had actually strangled Brian. According to Norma, when the trio were alone on the "Tin Lizzie", Mary "seemed to go all funny", pushing the child into the grass and attempting to strangle him before stating to her, "My hands are getting thick. Take over." She had then run from the scene, leaving Mary alone with Brian.

A forensic examination of clothing owned by both girls revealed the grey fibres discovered upon Brian's body were a precise match to a woollen dress owned by Mary; the maroon fibres upon the child's shoes were a precise match to a skirt owned by Norma. Furthermore, the same grey fibres had also been found upon the body of Martin Brown.

== Formal charges ==
Brian Howe was buried in a local cemetery on 7 August 1968 in a ceremony attended by over 200 people. According to DCI Dobson (who had planned to arrest both girls later that day), Mary Bell stood outside the Howe household as the child's coffin was brought from the home at the beginning of the funeral procession. Dobson later stated: "She stood there, laughing. Laughing and rubbing her hands. I thought, 'My God, I've got to bring her in. She'll do another one.'"

Both girls were formally charged with the murder of Brian Howe at 8 p.m. that evening. In response to this charge, Mary replied: "That's all right by me." Norma burst into tears, simply proclaiming: "I never. I'll pay you back for this."

In the presence of an independent witness, Mary prepared a written statement in which she admitted to being present when Brian Howe was murdered, but insisting the murder had been committed by Norma. She also admitted she and Norma had broken into the Woodland Crescent nursery the day after the killing of Martin Brown, defacing the property before the two had written the four handwritten notes.

=== Psychological evaluations ===
Shortly after their arrest, both girls underwent psychological evaluations. The results of these tests revealed Norma was intellectually delayed and a submissive character who easily displayed emotion, whereas Mary was a bright yet cunning character, prone to sudden mood swings. Occasionally, Mary was willing to talk, although she rapidly became sullen, introspective and defensive in nature.

The four psychiatrists who examined Mary concluded that, although not suffering from a mental disorder, she suffered from a psychopathic personality disorder. In his official report compiled for the Director of Public Prosecutions, David Westbury concluded: "[Mary's] social techniques are primitive and take the form of automatic denial, ingratiation, manipulation, complaining, bullying, flight or violence."

== Trial ==
The trial of Mary Bell and Norma Bell for the murders of Martin Brown and Brian Howe began at Newcastle Assizes on 5 December 1968. Both girls were tried before Mr Justice Cusack and a jury, and both pleaded not guilty to the charges. Mary was defended by Harvey Robson QC; Norma by R. P. Smith QC.

Against protests from both defence counsel, on the first day of the trial, the trial judge waived the defendants' right to anonymity on account of their age. As such, the media were allowed to publicise the names, ages and photographs of both girls, who each sat alongside plainclothed female police officers in the centre of the court, behind their legal representatives, and within arm's reach of their families throughout the duration of the trial.

Rudolph Lyons QC opened the case on behalf of the prosecution at 11:30 a.m. In an opening statement lasting six hours, Lyons informed the jury they faced an "unhappy and distressing" task due to the nature of the murders and the ages of the defendants. He then outlined the prosecution's intention to illustrate the similarities between both murders, which indicated both boys had been murdered by the same perpetrator or perpetrators. Lyons outlined the circumstances surrounding both deaths and the evidence indicating the defendants' guilt.

Although Lyons conceded in his opening statement that, despite the defendants' age difference, Mary was the more dominant of the two, he contended both girls had acted in unison and were equally culpable; killing both children "solely for the pleasure and excitement of murder", adding: "Both girls well knew that what they did was wrong and what the results would be."

=== Defendants' testimony ===
On the fifth day of the trial, Norma testified in her own defence. She denied any culpability in the actual murder of either child, but admitted under cross-examination to having known Mary's penchant for violence and her history of attacking children, and that the two had discussed attacking and killing small children of both sexes. Questioned by Rudolph Lyons as to whether Mary had demonstrated to her how children could be killed, Norma nodded. She then conceded that, as Mary had begun to attack and strangle Brian Howe, she had failed to alert a group of boys playing in the vicinity, stating she had failed to do so as "I did not know what was going to happen in the first place. She had stopped hurting him for a bit when the boys were near the [concrete blocks]". Questioned as to her own role in the murder, Norma stated she had "never touched" the child.

Following the conclusion of Norma's testimony on 12 December, Mary testified in her own defence. Her testimony lasted for almost four hours, concluding on 13 December, and was briefly adjourned on one occasion when she began crying in a policewoman's arms. She denied her co-defendant's accusations, insisting that although she had observed the body of Martin Brown at St. Margaret's Road, she herself had never harmed the child, and that she and Norma had later asked the boy's mother to view his body as the two were "daring each other and one of us did not want to be a chicken". Mary also conceded she had divulged to others her knowledge of Martin's death could "get Norma put straight away".

Questioned with regards to the death of Brian Howe, Mary claimed that Norma had been the individual who had strangled the child as she herself "was just standing and looking. I couldn't move. It was as if some glue was pulling us down." Mary then alleged Norma had encouraged Brian to lie down if he wanted some sweets, telling him: "You've got to lie down for the lady to come with the sweets" before proceeding to strangle him with her bare hands as she herself unsuccessfully attempted to prevent the attack. (As Mary stated these claims to the court, Norma wept, repeatedly saying, "I never, I never.") Mary further stated she could determine the level of force Norma had exhibited because "her fingertips and nails were going white", and again conceded she had failed to inform authorities of her knowledge of Norma's actions out of both fear and a misguided sense of loyalty.

Norma's mother, Catherine, then testified that, several months prior to the killing of Brian Howe, she and her husband had discovered Mary attempting to strangle Norma's younger sister, Susan, and that she had only released her grip on their daughter's throat after her husband had punched Mary in the shoulder. A child psychiatrist named Ian Frazer then testified that Norma's mental age was eight years and ten months and that, although her capacity of knowing right from wrong was limited, she was capable of appreciating the criminality of the acts she was accused of committing.

=== Closing arguments ===
On 13 December, Norma's defence counsel, R. P. Smith, delivered his closing argument to the jury. Smith emphasized that although both girls were on trial together, no real evidence existed against his client, and the only evidence against Norma was Mary's accusations against her. Smith implored the jurors to "suppress" feelings of outrage and malice, and dispel any idea that "both little girls" pay for the actions of one of them.

Harvey Robson then delivered his closing argument on behalf of Mary. Robson illustrated her broken background and dysfunctional family, and the blur between fantasy and reality in her mind. Robson also referenced the testimony of David Westbury, who had testified on behalf of the defence he had interviewed Mary on several occasions prior to the trial and had formed a "definite view" the child suffered from a serious personality disorder which he classified as a "retarded development of (her) mind", and that this had been caused by both genetic and environmental factors. This abnormality, Westbury had contended, had impaired Mary's actual responsibility for her acts.

Referencing the notes both girls had left in a nursery after the killing of Martin Brown, Robson stated the notes proved the crimes were a "childish fantasy" and, in Mary's case, were written to attract attention to herself.

In his closing argument, Rudolph Lyons described the case as a "macabre and grotesque" one, in which Mary—clearly the more domineering of the two despite being the younger girl—wielded a "very compelling influence, reminiscent of the fictional Svengali" over Norma, who, he conceded, was "of subnormal intelligence", stating: "I forecast to you that the younger girl—although two years and two months younger than the other—was nevertheless the cleverer and more dominating personality." Outlining the numerous lies Mary had told the police and court alike, Lyons further remarked of Mary's lack of remorse, and her high degree of cunning.

== Conviction ==
The trial lasted nine days. On 17 December, the jury retired to consider their verdict, and deliberated for three hours and twenty-five minutes before reaching their verdicts. Mary Bell was cleared of murder, but convicted of the manslaughter of both boys on the grounds of diminished responsibility; Norma Bell was acquitted of all charges. Upon hearing the jury's verdicts, Norma clapped her hands in excitement, whereas Mary burst into tears as her mother and grandmother also wept. (Note: The jury are believed to have been successfully persuaded in their verdicts by the diagnoses of court-appointed psychiatrists who had described Mary as displaying "classic symptoms of psychopathy".)

Passing sentence, Mr Justice Cusack described Mary Bell as a "dangerous" individual, adding she posed a "very grave risk to other children" and that "steps must be taken to protect [the public]" from her. She was sentenced to be detained at Her Majesty's pleasure; effectively an indefinite sentence of imprisonment.

At the time of Bell's manslaughter convictions, she was aged 11 years and six months, making her Britain's youngest female killer, a statistic which remains to the present day. (Note: The youngest female Briton to be convicted of murder is Sharon Carr.)

== Imprisonment ==
Bell was initially detained in a Durham remand home before being transferred to a second remand home, Cumberlow Lodge, in South Norwood. She was then transferred to Red Bank Secure Unit, a young offenders institution in Newton-le-Willows, Merseyside, in early 1969, where she was the only female among approximately 24 inmates. Bell would later claim that she was sexually abused by a member of staff and several inmates while incarcerated at this unit, claiming the sexual abuse began when she was aged 13. (Note: Bell's claims to have been sexually abused while detained at Red Bank secure unit would be contradicted by a man whom she later slept with having absconded from an open prison in 1977 at age 20. This individual would claim Bell surrendered her virginity to him in her few days of freedom prior to her re-apprehension, exclaiming to him she wished for a baby so she would no longer "be alone".) In November 1973, at age 16, she was transferred to a secure wing of HM Prison Styal in Cheshire. Reportedly, Bell resented her transferral to this facility, and, while incarcerated at HM Prison Styal, Bell unsuccessfully applied for parole.

In June 1976, Bell was transferred to Moor Court open prison, where she undertook a secretarial course. Fifteen months later, in September 1977, Bell again made national headlines when she and another inmate, Annette Priest, absconded from this open prison on 11 September. Both absconders spent several days in the company of two young men in Blackpool, visiting the amusements and sleeping in various local hotels, where Bell used the alias Mary Robinson before the two parted company.

Bell was arrested at the Derbyshire home of one of the men, Clive Shirtcliffe, on 13 September, having by this stage dyed her hair blonde in an effort to disguise her identity. She was returned to custody that evening; Priest was arrested in Leeds days later. Bell's penalty for absconding was a loss of prison privileges for 28 days. (Note: The two men who drove Bell and Priest to Blackpool and remained in their company were both petty thieves. Both men were given suspended prison sentences and fined £100 for harbouring prison escapees.)

== Release ==
In June 1979, the Home Office announced their decision to transfer Mary Bell to HM Prison Askham Grange, an open category prison in the village of Askham Richard in efforts to prepare her for her eventual release into society, which was planned for the following year. Beginning in November 1979, Bell worked first as a secretary, then as a waitress at a café in York Minster under supervision guidelines in efforts to prepare her for eventual release.

Bell was released from HM Prison Askham Grange in May 1980 at the age of 23, having served almost eleven and a half years in custody. She was granted anonymity (including a new name), allowing her to start a new life elsewhere in the country under an assumed identity. Upon her release, a spokesman is quoted as saying: "[Bell] wishes to be given a chance to live a normal life and to be left alone."

Four years after her release from custody, on 25 May 1984, Bell gave birth to a daughter. This would prove to be her only child. Her daughter knew nothing of her mother's past until 1998, when reporters discovered Bell's location in a resort town on the Sussex Coast, where both had been living for approximately 18 months. This media revelation forced Bell and her 14-year-old daughter to leave their home and be driven to a safe house by undercover officers. Both mother and daughter later relocated to another part of the United Kingdom.

Bell has allegedly returned to Tyneside on several occasions in the years following her release. She is also alleged to have lived in this location for a time.

=== Collaboration with Gitta Sereny ===
In 1998, Bell collaborated with author Gitta Sereny to provide an account of her life before and after her crimes for Sereny's 1998 book Cries Unheard: The Story of Mary Bell. Within this book, Bell details the abuse she suffered as a child at the hands of her prostitute mother (whom Bell describes as a dominatrix) and, she alleges, several of her mother's clients. Others interviewed are relatives, friends and professionals who knew her before, during and after her imprisonment. (Note: The publication of Cries Unheard: The Story of Mary Bell was controversial because Bell received approximately £15,000 from Sereny for her participation in the author's research. This payment was criticised by both the tabloid press and public. The government also unsuccessfully attempted to find a legal means to prevent the publication of the book upon the grounds that a criminal should not profit from his or her crimes. Sereny was also vilified by the families of Bell's victims; both for her decision to publish the book and her decision to focus upon Bell as opposed to her victims. This criticism inspired Sereny to personally write a letter to the mothers of both Martin Brown and Brian Howe, in which she apologised for failing to contact them with the excuse she was "unable to track [either mother] down" and claiming the families were never out of her mind.)

When reflecting upon her crimes in her interviews with Sereny, Bell claimed: "I didn't know I had intended for them to be dead ... dead forever. Dead for me then [did not mean] forever." When alluding to her interactions with various professionals following her arrest and their collective efforts to explain the magnitude of her crimes to her, Bell stated: "When I think of it now, it's really funny to think that nobody, nobody at all, ever talked to me in a way that could have made what I did real to me."

=== Lifelong anonymity ===
The right to anonymity granted to Bell's daughter following her birth was originally only extended until she had reached the age of 18. However, on 21 May 2003, Bell won a High Court battle to have her own anonymity, and that of her daughter, extended for life. This order was approved by Dame Elizabeth Butler-Sloss, President of the Family Division, and was later updated to include Bell's granddaughter (b. January 2009), who was referred to as "Z". The order also prohibits the divulgence of any aspects of their lives which may identify them. (Note: As a consequence of these legal rulings, any court order permanently protecting the identity of a convict in Britain is colloquially known as a "Mary Bell order".)

Bell's current whereabouts remain protected by the 2003 High Court order. According to Sereny, Bell does not claim she was wrongly convicted and freely admits the abuse she suffered as a child does not excuse her crimes.

== Media ==
=== Literature ===
- Becker, Ryan; Veysey, Nancy (2019). Mary Flora Bell: The Horrific True Story Behind An Innocent Girl Serial Killer. London: Independent Publishers. ISBN 978-1-793-19427-5.
- Sereny, Gitta (1972). The Case of Mary Bell: A Portrait of a Child Who Murdered. Grantham: Eyre Methuen Limited. ISBN 978-0-413-27940-8.
- Sereny, Gitta (2000) [1999]. Cries Unheard. Why Children Kill: The Story of Mary Bell. New York City: Macmillan Publishers. ISBN 978-0-805-06067-6.

=== Television ===
- The BBC have broadcast an episode focusing upon the crimes and conviction of Mary Bell as part of their 1998 series Children of Crime. Narrated by Jim Carter, this 48-minute episode features interviews with several of Bell's childhood peers in addition to police officers assigned to the case. This episode was first aired in April 1998.
- The Investigation Discovery channel commissioned a documentary focusing upon the killings committed by Mary Bell as part of their true-life crime documentary series Deadly Women. This 45-minute documentary, titled "Young Blood", was first broadcast on 20 August 2009.

== See also ==
- Age of criminal responsibility
- Capital punishment in the United Kingdom
- List of serial killers by number of victims
- Thrill killing

== Cited works and further reading ==
- Ascione, Frank R. (2005). Children and Animals: Exploring the Roots of Kindness and Cruelty. Purdue University Press. ISBN 978-1-55753-377-7.
- Buck, Paul (2012). Prison Break: True Stories of the World's Greatest Escapes. Sussex, England: John Blake Publishing. ISBN 978-1-857-82760-6.
- Butler, Ivan (1973). Murderers' England. Altrincham: Hale Publishing. ISBN 978-0-709-14054-2.
- Veysey, Nancy; Becker, Ryan (2018). Mary Flora Bell: The Horrific True Story Behind an Innocent Girl Serial Killer. Sea Vision Publishing. ISBN 978-1-9874-6788-8.
- Berry-Dee, Christopher (2018). Talking with Female Serial Killers: A Chilling Study of the Most Evil Women in the World. London: John Blake Publishing. ISBN 978-1-789-46003-2.
- Davis, Carol Anne (2004). Children Who Kill: Profiles of Pre-teen and Teenage Killers. London: Allison & Busby. ISBN 978-0-749-00693-8.
- Fido, Martin (1995). Chronicle of Twentieth Century Murder. London: Bracken Publishing. p. 78. ISBN 978-1-858-91390-2.
- Gaute, J. H. H.; Odell, Robin (1979). The Murderers' Who's Who: Outstanding International Cases from the Literature of Murder in the Last 150 Years. North Yorkshire: Methuen Publishing. ISBN 978-0-458-93900-8.
- Lane, Brian (1993). "Mary Flora Bell: Killer Child". Real-Life Crimes (36). London, England: Eaglemoss Publications Ltd. ISBN 978-1-856-29970-1.
- Larsen, Barbara (2009). The Human Dilemma. Indianapolis: Dog Ear Publishing. pp. 25–27, 30. ISBN 978-1-598-58639-8.
- Paul, Jonathan (2011). When Kids Kill: Shocking Crimes of Lost Innocence. London: Ebury Publishing. ISBN 978-1-448-11400-9.
- Smith, Katherine (1995). Mary Bell. Munich: BookRix. ISBN 978-3-748-76659-9.
- Waldfogel, Jane (2001). The Future of Child Protection: How to Break the Cycle of Abuse and Neglect. Massachusetts: Harvard University Press. ISBN 978-0-674-00723-9.
- Wilson, Colin (1985). Encyclopedia of Modern Murder: 1962–1982. Oregon: Bonanza Books. ISBN 978-0-517-66559-6.
- Woodward, Herbert N. (1971). The Human Dilemma. New York: Brookdale Press. ISBN 978-1-598-58639-8.
- Wynn, Douglas (1996). On Trial for Murder. London: Pan Books. pp. 23–25. ISBN 978-0-09-472990-2.
